= 2022 Italian presidential election =

Election of the president of the Italian Republic

- 24–29 January 2022

1,009 voters (Note: In the first ballot, the whole number of electors was 1,008 due to the death of Enzo Fasano. He was replaced starting from the second ballot by Rossella Sessa.) (321 senators, 630 deputies, and 58 regional delegates) 672 (1st ballot), 673 (2nd–3rd ballots), or 505 (4th ballot onwards) (Note: In the first ballot, the whole number of electors was 1,008, of which a two-thirds majority was needed (672 votes). In the second and third ballots, the whole number of electors was 1,009, of which a two-thirds majority was needed (673 votes). From the fourth ballot onward, the whole number of electors was 1,009, of which an absolute majority is needed (505 votes).) votes needed to win
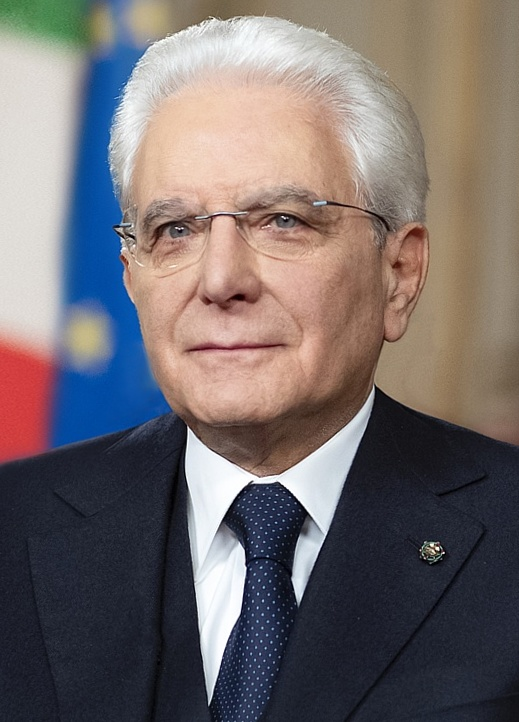

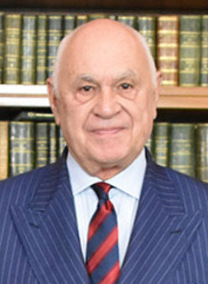
Nominee	Sergio Mattarella	Carlo Nordio
Party	Independent	Liberal
Electoral vote	759	90
Percentage	75.22%	8.92%
- Result on the eighth ballot (29 January 2022) Mattarella 759 Nordio 90 Di Matteo 37 Others 59 Invalid, blank, absentees 64
President before election
Sergio Mattarella
Independent
Elected President
Sergio Mattarella
Independent

The 2022 Italian presidential election was held in Rome between 24 and 29 January 2022. The president of Italy was elected by a joint assembly composed of the Italian Parliament and regional representatives. The election process extended over multiple days, culminating in incumbent president Sergio Mattarella being confirmed for a second term, with a total of 759 votes on the eighth ballot. This was the second most votes (after Sandro Pertini in 1978) ever received by a presidential candidate. Mattarella became the second president to be re-elected, his predecessor Giorgio Napolitano being the first.

Mattarella had initially ruled out a second term. On 29 January, he agreed to serve a second term, as most party leaders and Mario Draghi, the prime minister of Italy, asked him to accept their joint nomination for another term. Mattarella had previously already received significant and growing support in several rounds of voting, namely 125 votes on the third ballot, 166 votes on the fourth ballot, 336 votes on the sixth ballot, and 387 votes on the seventh ballot. Among Italian presidential elections, the 2022 election had the highest number of ballots since 1992, when Oscar Luigi Scalfaro was elected on the 16th ballot.

== History ==
=== Political background (2015–2021) ===
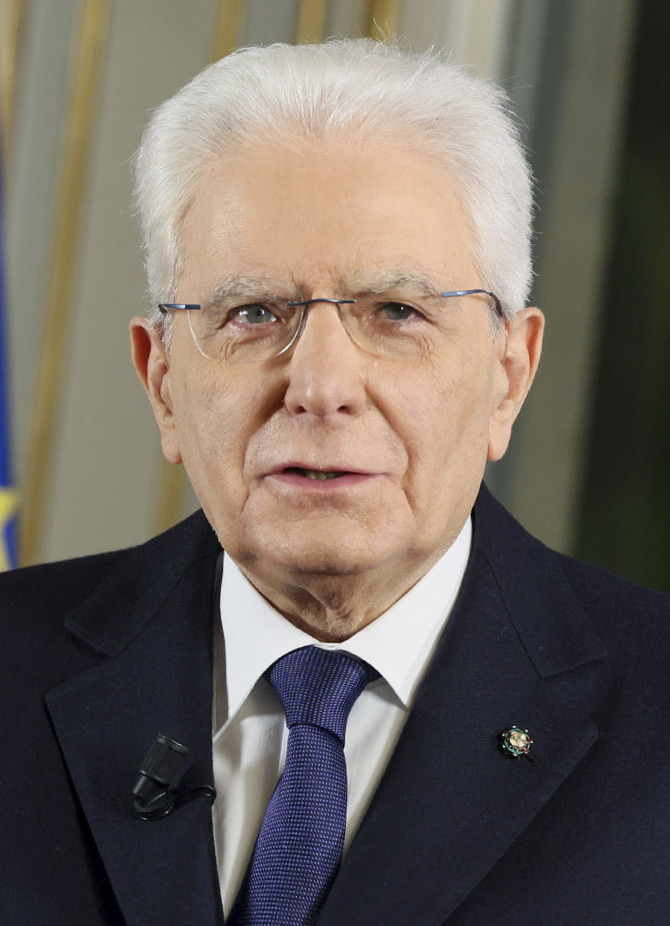
The incumbent president Sergio Mattarella, whose sole term was set to expire in February 2022. After initially ruling out a second term, Mattarella agreed to stand again.

The incumbent president Sergio Mattarella was elected in 2015 by the Italian Parliament and regional representatives. Mattarella was supported by the centre-left coalition, led by then-prime minister and secretary of the Democratic Party (PD) Matteo Renzi, and gained broad support. The result of the 2016 Italian constitutional referendum led to Renzi's resignation and to the formation of the Gentiloni Cabinet headed by Paolo Gentiloni, at the time a deputy from the PD and the incumbent Italian Minister of Foreign Affairs, as the prime minister.

The 2018 general election resulted in a hung parliament. As a result of the ensuing government formation talks, the Five Star Movement (M5S) and the League (Lega) formed a new cabinet led Giuseppe Conte, a law professor close to the M5S. During the government formation, Mattarella's role became particularly important when he refused to appoint the Eurosceptic economist Paolo Savona as minister of finance.

In August 2019, Lega's leader Matteo Salvini announced a motion of no confidence against Conte after growing tensions within the majority. Many political analysts believed that the no confidence motion was an attempt to force early elections and to improve Lega's standing in the parliament, so that Salvini could become the next prime minister. On 21 August, Mattarella started the consultations with all the parliamentary groups. On the same day, the national direction of the PD officially opened to form a new cabinet in a coalition with the M5S. On 29 August, Mattarella summoned Conte to the Quirinal Palace to give him the task of forming the new cabinet.

In 2020, Italy became one of the countries worst affected by the COVID-19 pandemic. Conte's government was the first in the Western world to implement a national pandemic lockdown to stop the spread of the disease. Despite being widely approved by public opinion, the COVID-19 pandemic lockdown in Italy was also described as the largest suppression of constitutional rights in the history of the Italian Republic. Mattarella described the COVID-19 crisis as "three emergencies on the health, social and economic fronts" that needed a stable government and made sure a new government could be formed after the Conte II Cabinet fell, amid high popularity, with the possibility of a second term.

In January 2021, Renzi's Italia Viva (IV), a member of the coalition supporting Conte's cabinet, withdrew its support for the government. Although Conte won confidence votes in the parliament in the subsequent days, he chose to resign, having failed to reach an absolute majority in the Senate of the Republic. After negotiations to form a third Conte cabinet failed, President Mattarella appointed Mario Draghi, the former president of the European Central Bank, as the prime minister at the head of a national unity government composed of independent technocrats and politicians from M5S, Lega, PD, IV, Forza Italia (FI), and Free and Equal (LeU).

=== Race for the presidency (2021–2022) ===
During 2021, President Mattarella expressed his unavailability regarding a second a final term, which had been proposed by various political forces, recalling similar remarks made by his predecessors Antonio Segni and Giovanni Leone. Other political figures stated that they did not intend to run as president, among them Romano Prodi, Emma Bonino, and Liliana Segre.

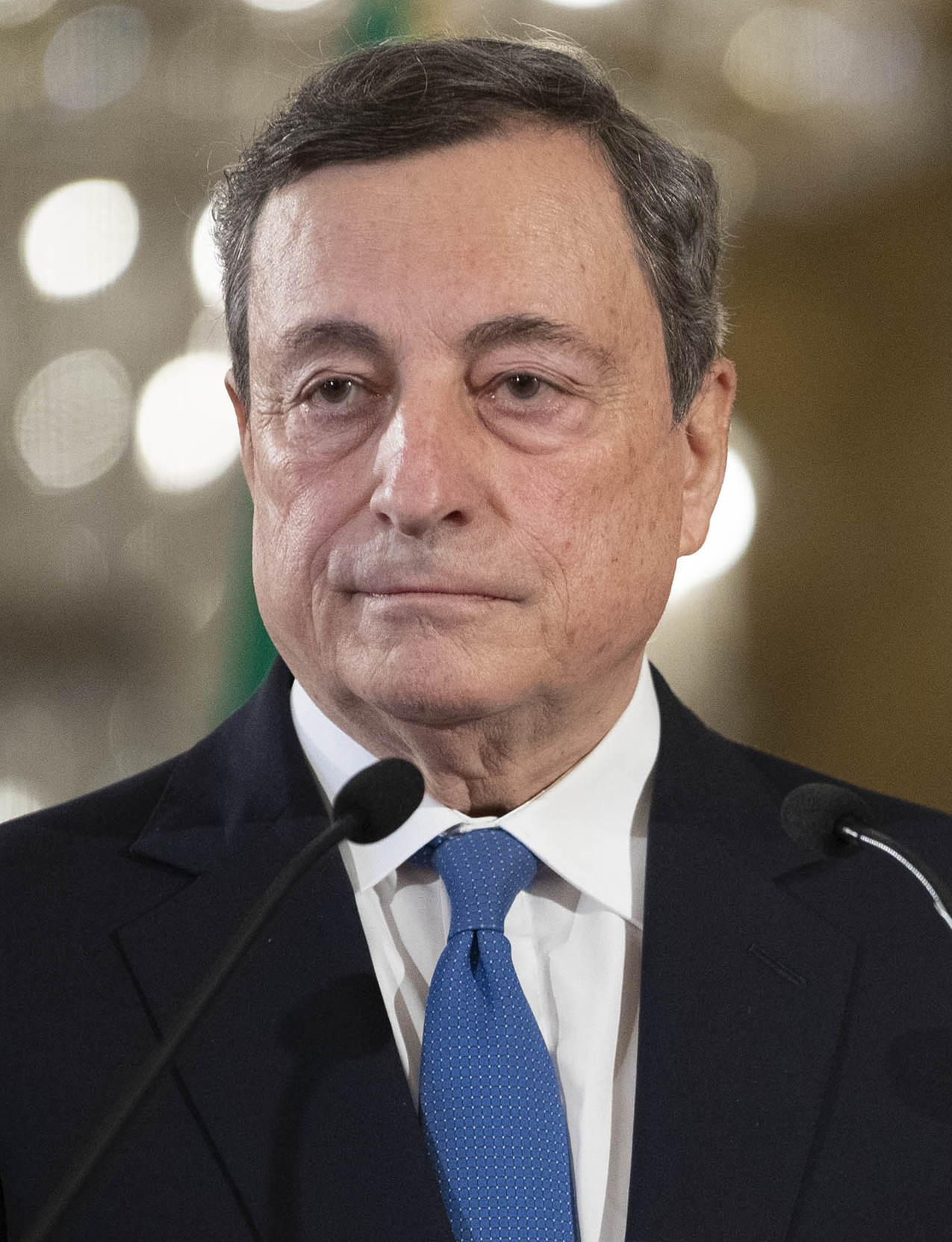
Prime Minister Mario Draghi was widely seen as a probable successor of Mattarella.

During a press conference in Rome on 22 December 2021, Prime Minister Draghi, questioned on the hypothesis of his rise to the Quirinal Palace, declared that he was "a grandfather in the service of institutions". The declaration was interpreted as a confirmation of his willingness to be elected president and accelerated the debate around the consequences of a possible election to the presidency of the incumbent prime minister, something that had never happened before. Several national and foreign observers considered Draghi to be a probable candidate for the presidency, among them the Corriere della Sera, The Economist, Le Figaro, the Financial Times, Le Monde, the Süddeutsche Zeitung, and The New York Times.

On 14 January 2022, the leaders of the centre-right coalition expressed their willingness to nominate former prime minister Silvio Berlusconi as their candidate to the presidency. Berlusconi's candidacy was widely criticised by PD, M5S, and other centrist and leftist parties. PD secretary Enrico Letta described it as "divisive", stating that Italy needed a unitary president and not a long-time party leader like Berlusconi. On 22 January, after acknowledging that he did not have enough votes to be elected, Berlusconi announced the withdrawal of his candidacy.

On 16 January, forty parliamentarians in opposition to the Draghi government and belonging to the Mixed Group factions of Alternativa, Communist Party (PC), and Power to the People (PaP), supported the candidacy of the former vice-president of the Constitutional Court of Italy Paolo Maddalena, subsequently obtaining the support of Italexit, Italy of Values (IdV), and the Communist Refoundation Party (PRC), the latter of which was not represented in the assembly. Before the start of the voting process, PaP withdrew its support for Maddalena due to his positions against abortion and same-sex marriage. A similar choice was also expressed within the Mixed Group by Green Italia's parliamentary group FacciamoEco, which decided to vote for Marco Cappato, an activist and member of the Italian Radicals.

Various hypothetical candidacies were proposed by media, journalists and political analysts in the days before the election. The list notably included Elisabetta Casellati, who is serving as the president of the Senate, former president of the Senate Marcello Pera, former presidents of the Chamber of Deputies like Pier Ferdinando Casini and Luciano Violante, the European Commissioner and former prime minister Paolo Gentiloni, the judge of the Constitutional Court of Italy and former prime minister Giuliano Amato, former ministers like Franco Frattini, Giulio Tremonti, Andrea Riccardi, Rosy Bindi, and Paola Severino, the judge of the Constitutional Court of Italy Silvana Sciarra, and the diplomat Elisabetta Belloni. David Sassoli, President of the European Parliament, was also a potential candidate for the PD until his death on 11 January 2022.

On 24 January, the day of the first ballot, in the absence of a common candidate, both centre-right and centre-left coalitions requested the blank vote. On the other hand, the candidacies of Maddalena and Cappato were voted by minor parties and parliamentary groups, while Action and More Europe confirmed their support to the Minister of Justice Marta Cartabia. On the same day, Giorgia Meloni, leader of Brothers of Italy (FdI), proposed former deputy attorney of Venice Carlo Nordio. Nordio rejected the candidacy, citing lack of political experience.

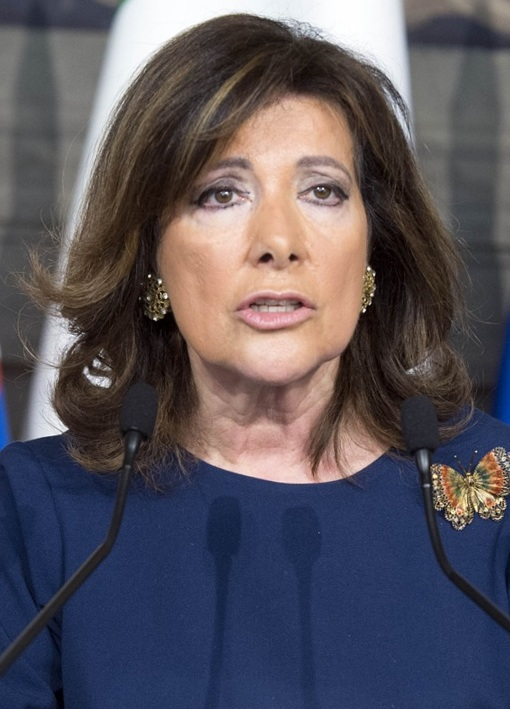
President of the Senate Elisabetta Casellati was nominated by the centre-right coalition but did not succeed in getting elected in the fifth ballot.

On 25 January, the leaders of the centre-right coalition organized a press conference to announce a list of presidential candidates. The candidates were Marcello Pera, former president of the Senate, Letizia Moratti, a former mayor of Milan who previously rejected the candidacy in favor of Berlusconi, and Nordio, the former magistrate who also had already rejected the candidacy. Letta described the three candidacies as "a step forward, useful for dialogue"; however, he said that he did not believe that these candidacies could be considered as shared among the political sides. Also in the second round, both the centre-right and centre-left coalitions decided to vote blank.

On 26 January, Meloni officially proposed her own party's co-founder Guido Crosetto as candidate in the third ballot, while members of For the Autonomies, a minor group of regionalist parties, announced their votes for Casini. Despite the two coalitions still deciding to vote blank, incumbent president Mattarella resulted as the most voted candidate with 125 votes, even though no parties proposed him as candidate and he had always ruled out a second term. Mattarella was followed by Crosetto with 114, Maddalena with 61, and Casini with 52.

On 27 January, contrasts between the two major coalitions prevented the proposal of a shared candidacy. On the fourth ballot, the centre-right coalition decided to abstain, while the centre-left one voted blank. Alternativa and other minor opposition parties voted for Nino Di Matteo, an anti-mafia prosecutor and member of the High Council of the Judiciary. Once again, President Mattarella resulted as the most voted candidate, gaining 166 votes, followed by Di Matteo with 56 votes.

On 28 January, the centre-right coalition officially proposed Casellati as its candidate for the presidency in the fifth ballot. Casellati, President of the Senate and member of FI, was strongly supported by the League's leader Matteo Salvini, who stated that it was a "true honor to propose her as the first female president". The centre-left coalition opposed her candidacy and decided to abstain. Casellati gained a mere result of 382 votes, far below the majority threshold of 505 required to be elected and even below the number of centre-right electors, due to more than 70 so-called "free snipers" (Italian: franchi tiratori). Casellati was followed by Mattarella with 46 votes and Di Matteo with 38. In the sixth ballot on the evening of 28 January, the centre-right abstained, while the centre-left formally voted blank. Once again, President Mattarella resulted as the most voted candidate with 336 votes, despite any party formally supporting his re-election, as well as his firm denial to a second term.

On the evening of 28 January, Salvini announced his willingness to propose a female candidate as president. Salvini's statement was soon followed by a remark of Giuseppe Conte, president of the M5S, opening to a possibile agreement between Lega and M5S on the candidacy of Elisabetta Belloni, a diplomat and director of the Department of Information for Security. This possibility was later confirmed with a tweet by M5S founder Beppe Grillo, who wrote: "Welcome Madame Italy, Elisabetta Belloni." Belloni's candidacy was immediately opposed by former prime minister and IV leader Matteo Renzi, who stated that the serving head of national intelligence could not be elected president, while the foreign affairs minister Luigi Di Maio described the manner Belloni was proposed as "indecorous". The candidacy was also attacked by Coraggio Italia (CI), FI, LeU, and by various factions of the PD and M5S.

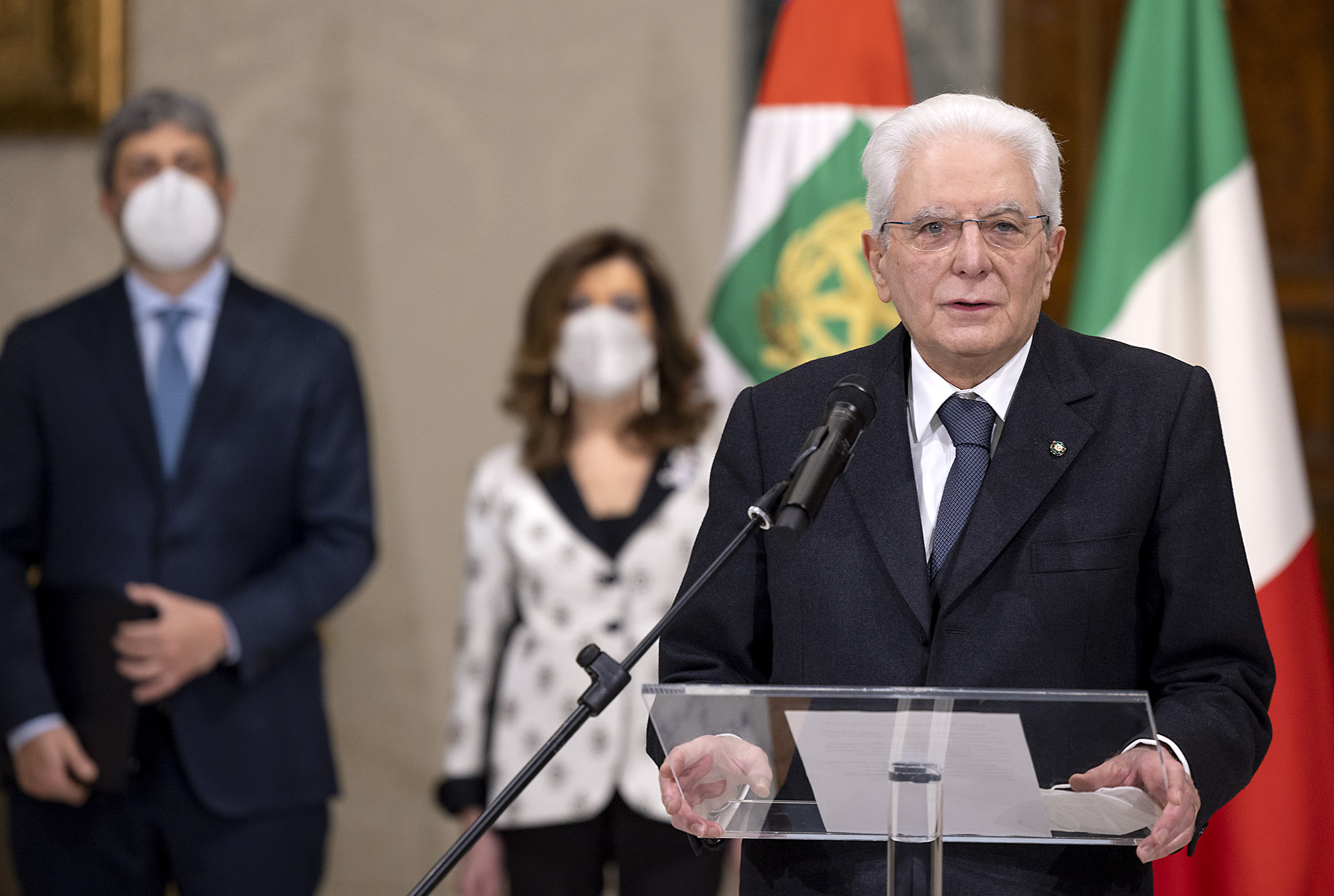
President Mattarella accepted his re-election on 29 January 2022.

On the morning of 29 January, the seventh ballot was inconclusive, as Lega and FI abstained, the centre-left voted blank, and FdI supported Nordio. Mattarella was again the most voted candidate with 387 votes, followed by Nordio with 64, and Di Matteo with 40. During the seventh ballot, after the fall of all other possible candidacies, the re-election of incumbent president Mattarella became a serious alternative. Letta, who had already proposed his re-election a few weeks before, asked the other leaders to follow "the Parliament's wisdom", referring to the massive support that Mattarella had received in the previous ballots.

Accusing the centre-left of having rejected all his proposals, Salvini opened to a new term for the incumbent president. Salvini's proposal for a new term met the criticism of Meloni, who stated in a tweet that she did not "want to believe it". Casini, who was widely considered one of the most reliable candidates, asked to rule out his name and vote for Mattarella. Prime Minister Draghi, another probable candidate, asked Mattarella to accept a second term for "the good and the stability of the country". In the early afternoon, the delegations of parliamentary groups of PD, M5S, Lega, FI, IV, CI, LeU, and For the Autonomies went to the Quirinal Palace asking Mattarella to concede his availability to a second term. Mattarella agreed to get re-elected.

On the evening of 29 January, in the eighth ballot, Mattarella was re-elected President of Italy with 759 votes; he received the second most votes of any presidential candidate after Sandro Pertini in 1978. In the ballot, Mattarella was followed by Nordio with 90 votes and Di Matteo with 37. Following the election, the presidents of the two houses of Parliament, Roberto Fico and Casellati, announced the results to Mattarella. The re-elected president gave a brief acceptance speech.

== Procedure ==
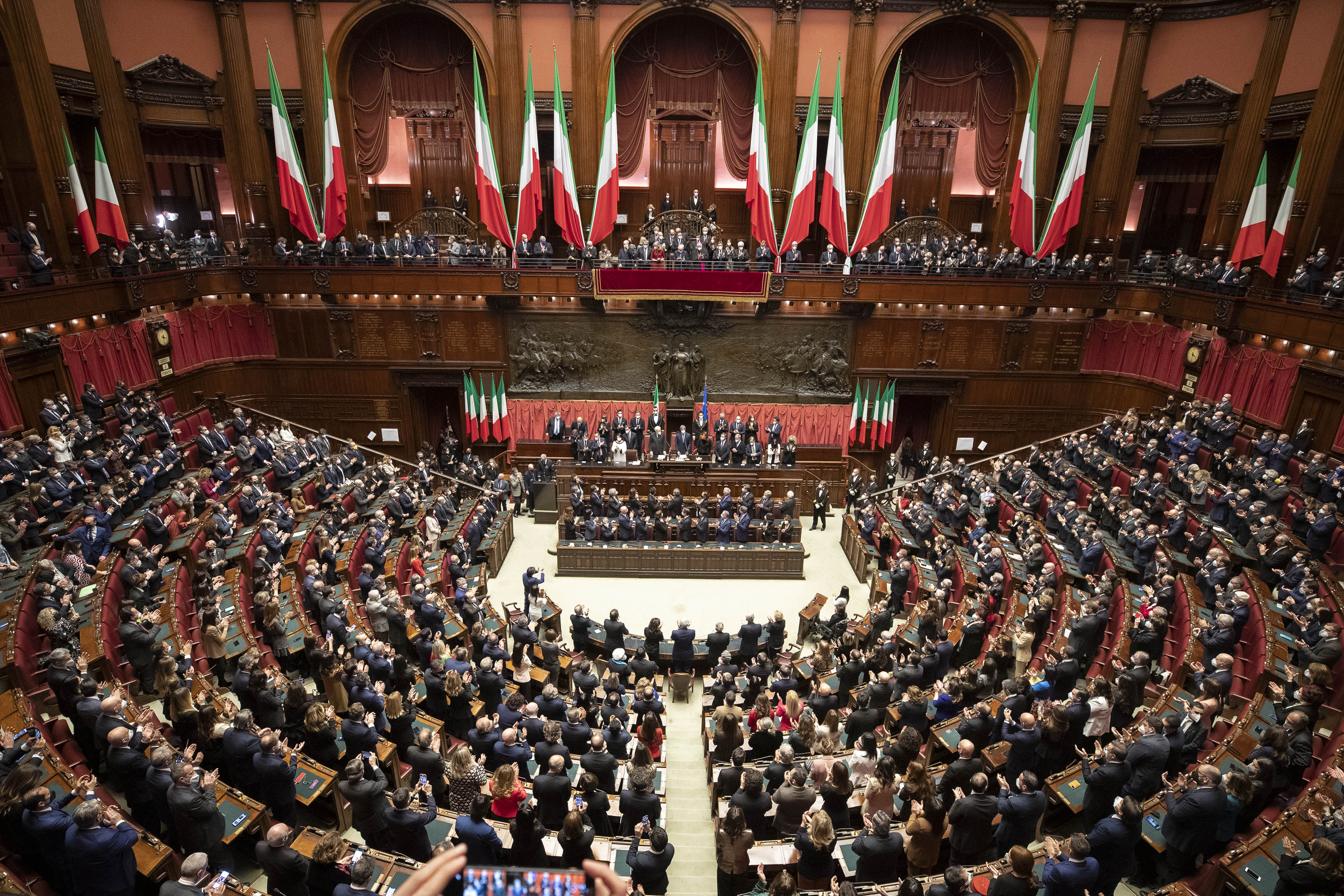
The joint session of the Italian Parliament at Palazzo Montecitorio for the swearing-in ceremony of President Mattarella

In accordance with the Constitution of Italy, the election was held in the form of a secret ballot, with 321 senators, 630 deputies, and 58 regional representatives entitled to vote. Each of the twenty regions of Italy had three representatives, except for Aosta Valley, which had only one. The election was held in the Palazzo Montecitorio, home of the Chamber of Deputies, with the capacity of the assembly room expanded for the purpose. As there is no official candidacy process, representatives were free to vote for any person who meets the requirements. The first three ballots require a two-thirds majority of the 1,009 voters to elect a president, or 673 votes. Starting from the fourth ballot, an absolute majority is required for candidates to be elected, or 505 votes. The presidential mandate lasts seven years.

The election process started on 24 January 2022. The election was presided over by Roberto Fico, President of the Chamber of Deputies, who processed the public counting of the votes, and by Elisabetta Casellati, President of the Senate. Fico had anticipated that he would consider only announcing the surname of the candidate written on each ballot whilst counting the votes, ignoring any additional names or titles. This was seen as a move to counteract Berlusconi's strategy, which reportedly involved having his supporters mark the ballots in recognizable ways, as well as a way to conceal Fico's party, the Five Star Movement, well-known internal fractures in the case their vote would prove crucial to elect the president. The presidential election procedure has been likened to a papal conclave by international observers, among them Bloomberg News, The New York Times, and The Washington Post. Others, such as Politico, drew a comparison with the Netflix TV show Squid Game.

=== Eligibility requirements ===
The eligibility requirements, contained in the first paragraph of Article 84 of the Constitution of Italy, are to have Italian citizenship, have reached the age of 50, and enjoy civil and political rights.

== Electoral assembly ==
Electors per parliamentary group, including the regional delegates, were announced on the date of the election. With no snap elections being held on the national or regional level, below is the party breakdown of the presidential electors.

Composition of the electoral assembly
Parliamentary group	Deputies	Senators	Regional delegates	Total electors	% of assembly
Five Star Movement	157	73	4	234	23.2
League	133	64	15	212	21.0
Democratic Party	95	40	20	155	15.4
Forza Italia – UDC	79	52	10	141	14.0
Brothers of Italy	37	21	6	64	6.3
Italia Viva	29	15	0	44	4.4
Coraggio Italia	22	9	1	32	3.2
Free and Equal	12	6	0	18	1.8
Mixed Group	66	41	2	109	10.8
Total	630	321	58	1,009	100.0

== Proposed candidates ==
These candidates were officially proposed as president and voted in at least one ballot, by parties, coalitions, or parliamentary groups which took part in the election.

=== Elected president ===
Portrait	Name	Party	Office(s) held	Region of birth	Profession(s)	Supporting party or coalition	Ref.
Sergio Mattarella	Sergio Mattarella (born 1941)	Independent	President of Italy (2015–present) Other offices: Judge of the Constitutional Court of Italy (2011–2015); Minister of Defence (1999–2001); Deputy Prime Minister of Italy (1998–1999); Minister of Education (1989–1990); Minister for Parliamentary Relations (1987–1989); Member of the Chamber of Deputies (1983–2008)	Sicily	Jurist	M5S • Lega • PD • FI • IV • CI • LeU • Aut • Az • +Eu	

=== Other candidates ===
Portrait	Name	Party	Office(s) held	Region of birth	Profession(s)	Supporting party or coalition	Ref.
Carlo Nordio	Carlo Nordio (Note: The centre-right coalition proposed Moratti, Nordio, and Pera as three possible candidates to the presidency but never voted them in a ballot.) (Note: On 29 January, FdI supported Nordio against the joint candidacy of Mattarella.) (born 1947)	Italian Liberal Party	Deputy Attorney of Venice (until 2017) Other offices: Consultant for the Parliamentary Commission on Terrorism (1997–2001); President of the Commission for the reformation of the Penal Code (2002–2006)	Veneto	Magistrate	FdI	
Nino Di Matteo	Nino Di Matteo (born 1961)	Independent	Member of the High Council of the Judiciary (2019–present) Other offices: President of the National Magistrates Association of Palermo (2012–present)	Sicily	Magistrate	Alternativa	

=== Withdrawn candidates ===
Portrait	Name	Party	Office(s) held	Region of birth	Profession(s)	Supporting party or coalition	Ref.
	Marco Cappato (born 1971)	Italian Radicals	President of the Italian Radicals (2015–2016) Other offices: Treasurer of the Associazione Luca Coscioni (2011–present); Member of the City Council of Milan (2011–2016); Secretary of the Associazione Luca Coscioni (2004–2011); Member of the European Parliament (2006–2009; 1999–2004); Member of the Chamber of Deputies (2006)	Lombardy	Activist	FacciamoEco	
Marta Cartabia	Marta Cartabia (born 1963)	Independent	Minister of Justice (2021–2022) Other offices: President of the Constitutional Court of Italy (2019–2020); Vice President of the Constitutional Court of Italy (2014–2019); Judge of the Constitutional Court of Italy (2011–2020)	Lombardy	University professor	Az • +Eu	
Elisabetta Casellati	Elisabetta Casellati (born 1946)	Forza Italia	President of the Senate (2018–2022) Other offices: Member of the Senate (1994–1996; 2001–2014; 2018–present); Member of the High Council of the Judiciary (2014–2018); Undersecretary of State to the Ministry of Justice (2008–2011); Undersecretary of State to the Ministry of Health (2004–2006)	Veneto	Lawyer	Lega • FI • FdI • CI	
Pier Ferdinando Casini	Pier Ferdinando Casini (born 1955)	Centrists for Europe	President of the Chamber of Deputies (2001–2006) Other offices: Member of the Senate (2013–present); Leader of Centrists for Europe (2016–present); Member of the Chamber of Deputies (1983–2013); Leader of the Union of the Centre (2002–2016); Secretary of the Christian Democratic Centre (1994–2001)	Emilia-Romagna	Politician	For the Autonomies	
Guido Crosetto	Guido Crosetto (born 1963)	Brothers of Italy	Member of the Chamber of Deputies (2001–2013; 2018–2019) Other offices: Coordinator of Brothers of Italy (2013–2014; 2018–present); President of Brothers of Italy (2012–2013); Under-Secretary to Ministry of Defence (2008–2011); Mayor of Marene from 1990 to 2004	Piedmont	Entrepreneur	FdI	
Paolo Maddalena	Paolo Maddalena (born 1936)	Independent	Vice President of the Constitutional Court of Italy (2010–2011) Other offices: Judge of the Constitutional Court of Italy (2002–2011)	Campania	Magistrate	Alternativa • PC • IdV • Italexit	
Luigi Manconi	Luigi Manconi (born 1948)	Democratic Party	Member of the Senate (1994–2001; 2013–2018) Other offices: President of the Special Commission for the Protection and Promotion of Human Rights (2013–2018)	Sardinia	University professor	SI • EV	
Letizia Moratti	Letizia Moratti (born 1949)	Independent	Vice President of Lombardy (2021–2022) Other offices: Assessor of Welfare of Lombardy (2021–2022); Mayor of Milan (2006–2011); Minister of Public Education (2001–2006)	Lombardy	Entrepreneur	Lega • FI • FdI • CI	
Marcello Pera	Marcello Pera (born 1943)	Independent	President of the Senate (2001–2006) Other offices: Member of the Senate (1996–2013)	Tuscany	Philosopher	Lega • FI • FdI • CI	

== Results ==
=== First ballot (24 January) ===
A two-thirds majority of 672 votes was needed to elect a candidate on the first ballot. Since two thirds of the electors left their ballots blank following party instructions, and others cast invalid votes, no candidate could receive the required majority. The candidate with the most votes was Paolo Maddalena, supported by members of the Mixed Group, with 36 votes, followed by incumbent President Mattarella and incumbent Minister of Justice Marta Cartabia.

Another ballot was scheduled on 25 January.

Candidate	Party	Votes
Paolo Maddalena	Independent	36
Sergio Mattarella	Independent	16
Marta Cartabia	Independent	9
Silvio Berlusconi	Forza Italia	7
Roberto Cassinelli	Forza Italia	7
Guido De Martini	League	7
Antonio Tasso	MAIE	7
Umberto Bossi	League	6
Ettore Rosato	Italia Viva	6
Marco Cappato	Italian Radicals	5
Cesare Pianasso	League	4
Bruno Vespa	Independent	4
Enzo Alaia	Italia Viva	3
Maria Teresa Baldini	Italia Viva	3
Elisabetta Belloni	Independent	3
Pier Luigi Bersani	Article One	3
Giorgio Lauro	Independent	3
Claudio Lotito	Forza Italia	3
Francesco Rutelli	Independent	3
Claudio Sabelli Fioretti	Independent	3
Amedeo Sebastiani	Independent	3
Giuliano Amato	Independent	2
Alberto Angela	Independent	2
Elisabetta Casellati	Forza Italia	2
Pier Ferdinando Casini	Centrists for Europe	2
Giuseppe Conte	Five Star Movement	2
Gianluca De Fazio	Independent	2
Giancarlo Giorgetti	League	2
Ermanno Leo	Independent	2
Antonio Martino	Forza Italia	2
Ugo Mattei	Independent	2
Giuseppe Moles	Forza Italia	2
Carlo Nordio	Independent	2
Paolo Siani	Democratic Party	2
Others		88
Invalid votes		49
Blank votes		672
Voters		976
Absentees		32
Total		1,008
Source: Italian Parliament

=== Second ballot (25 January) ===
A two-thirds majority of 673 votes was needed to elect a candidate on the second ballot. Since more than half of the electors left their ballots blank following party instructions, and others cast invalid votes, no candidate could receive the required majority and another vote was scheduled on 26 January.

Candidate	Party	Votes
Paolo Maddalena	Independent	39
Sergio Mattarella	Independent	39
Renzo Tondo	Us with Italy	18
Roberto Cassinelli	Forza Italia	17
Ettore Rosato	Italia Viva	14
Umberto Bossi	League	12
Marta Cartabia	Independent	8
Giancarlo Giorgetti	League	8
Luigi Manconi	Democratic Party	8
Silvio Berlusconi	Forza Italia	7
Giuseppe Moles	Forza Italia	7
Pier Luigi Bersani	Article One	6
Serafino Generoso	Independent	6
Nicola Gratteri	Independent	6
Cesare Pianasso	League	5
Stefano Bandecchi	Independent	4
Marco Cappato	Italian Radicals	4
Gian Marco Chiocci	Independent	4
Roberto Dipiazza	Forza Italia	4
Mario Draghi	Independent	4
Enrico Ruggeri	Independent	4
Eugenio Sangregorio	USEI	4
Alberto Angela	Independent	3
Maria Teresa Baldini	Italia Viva	3
Elisabetta Belloni	Independent	3
Elisabetta Casellati	Forza Italia	3
Giorgio Lauro	Independent	3
Giulio Prosperetti	Independent	3
Francesco Rutelli	Independent	3
Raffaele Volpi	League	3
Fulvio Abbate	Independent	2
Giuliano Amato	Independent	2
Nicola Armaroli	Independent	2
Alessandro Barbero	Independent	2
Pier Ferdinando Casini	Centrists for Europe	2
Michele Cattarinich	Independent	2
Giuseppe Chinè	Independent	2
Massimo Giletti	Independent	2
Ulisse Ianni	Independent	2
Toni Iwobi	League	2
Ugo Mattei	Independent	2
Cesare Mirabelli	Independent	2
Antonio Razzi	Forza Italia	2
Claudio Sabelli Fioretti	Independent	2
Gianfranco Sciscione	Independent	2
Giulio Tremonti	Independent	2
Others		128
Invalid votes		38
Blank votes		527
Voters		976
Absentees		33
Total		1,009
Source: Italian Parliament

=== Third ballot (26 January) ===
A two-thirds majority of 673 votes was needed to elect a candidate on the third ballot. Since nearly half of the electors left their ballots blank following party instructions, and others cast invalid votes, no candidate could receive the required majority and another vote was scheduled on 27 January.

Candidate	Party	Votes
Sergio Mattarella	Independent	125
Guido Crosetto	Brothers of Italy	114
Paolo Maddalena	Independent	61
Pier Ferdinando Casini	Centrists for Europe	52
Giancarlo Giorgetti	League	19
Marta Cartabia	Independent	8
Luigi Manconi	Democratic Party	8
Pier Luigi Bersani	Article One	7
Umberto Bossi	League	7
Marco Cappato	Italian Radicals	6
Marco Doria	Independent	6
Clemente Mastella	Us of Centre	6
Giuseppe Moles	Forza Italia	6
Mario Draghi	Independent	5
Silvio Berlusconi	Forza Italia	4
Nicola Gratteri	Independent	4
Elisabetta Belloni	Independent	3
Paolo Coretti	Independent	3
Maria Teresa Baldini	Italia Viva	2
Stefano Bandecchi	Independent	2
Francesco Cappello	Independent	2
Umberto Del Basso De Caro	Democratic Party	2
Cesare Pianasso	League	2
Giovanni Sanna	Independent	2
Gianfranco Sciscione	Independent	2
Bruno Vespa	Independent	2
Others		84
Invalid votes		22
Blank votes		412
Voters		978
Absentees		31
Total		1,009
Source: Italian Parliament

=== Fourth ballot (27 January) ===
An absolute majority of 505 votes was needed to elect a candidate on the fourth ballot. Since the centre-right coalition decided to abstain and the centre-left voted blank, no candidate could receive the required majority and another vote was scheduled on 28 January.

Candidate	Party	Votes
Sergio Mattarella	Independent	166
Nino Di Matteo	Independent	56
Luigi Manconi	Democratic Party	8
Marta Cartabia	Independent	6
Mario Draghi	Independent	5
Giuliano Amato	Independent	4
Pier Ferdinando Casini	Centrists for Europe	3
Maria Teresa Baldini	Italia Viva	2
Elisabetta Belloni	Independent	2
Pier Luigi Bersani	Article One	2
Others		20
Invalid votes		5
Blank votes		261
Voters		540
Abstentions		441
Absentees		28
Total		1,009
Source: Italian Parliament

=== Fifth ballot (28 January) ===
An absolute majority of 505 votes was needed to elect a candidate on the fifth ballot. The centre-right coalition proposed Elisabetta Casellati as its candidate, while the centre-left and M5S, opposing her, decided to abstain. Casellati received only 382 votes, far below the required majority, and another vote was scheduled for 5pm on 28 January.

Candidate	Party	Votes
Elisabetta Casellati	Forza Italia	382
Sergio Mattarella	Independent	46
Nino Di Matteo	Independent	38
Silvio Berlusconi	Forza Italia	8
Marta Cartabia	Independent	7
Antonio Tajani	Forza Italia	7
Pier Ferdinando Casini	Centrists for Europe	6
Mario Draghi	Independent	3
Elisabetta Belloni	Independent	2
Joseph César Perrin	Valdostan Union	2
Others		9
Invalid Votes		9
Blank votes		11
Voters		530
Abstentions		406
Absentees		73
Total		1,009
Source: Italian Parliament

=== Sixth ballot (28 January) ===
An absolute majority of 505 votes was needed to elect a candidate on the sixth ballot. The centre-right coalition abstained, while the centre-left voted blank. Despite the lack of any formal support to his candidacy, Mattarella led with 336 votes, still well short of the required majority, and the seventh and eighth ballots were scheduled for 9:30am and 4:30pm, respectively, on 29 January.

Candidate	Party	Votes
Sergio Mattarella	Independent	336
Nino Di Matteo	Independent	37
Pier Ferdinando Casini	Centrists for Europe	9
Luigi Manconi	Democratic Party	8
Mario Draghi	Independent	5
Marta Cartabia	Independent	5
Elisabetta Belloni	Independent	4
Giuliano Amato	Independent	3
Elisabetta Casellati	Forza Italia	2
Others		9
Invalid Votes		4
Blank votes		106
Voters		532
Abstentions		444
Absentees		33
Total		1,009
Source: Italian Parliament

=== Seventh ballot (29 January) ===
An absolute majority of 505 votes was needed to elect a candidate on the seventh ballot. The centre-right coalition abstained, while the centre-left formally voted blank. Once again, Mattarella led with 387 votes, still well short of the required majority, and the eighth ballot was scheduled for 4:30pm on 29 January.

Candidate	Party	Votes
Sergio Mattarella	Independent	387
Carlo Nordio	Italian Liberal Party	64
Nino Di Matteo	Independent	40
Pier Ferdinando Casini	Centrists for Europe	10
Elisabetta Belloni	Independent	8
Luigi Manconi	Democratic Party	6
Marta Cartabia	Independent	4
Mario Draghi	Independent	2
Emilio Scalzo	Independent	2
Others		9
Invalid Votes		4
Blank votes		60
Voters		596
Abstentions		380
Absentees		33
Total		1,009
Source: Italian Parliament

=== Eighth and final ballot (29 January) ===
An absolute majority of 505 votes was needed to elect a candidate on the eighth ballot. After Mattarella reversed his earlier position and agreed to serve a second term, he obtained the necessary majority and was re-elected president.

Candidate	Party	Votes
Sergio Mattarella	Independent	759
Carlo Nordio	Italian Liberal Party	90
Nino Di Matteo	Independent	37
Silvio Berlusconi	Forza Italia	9
Elisabetta Belloni	Independent	6
Pier Ferdinando Casini	Centrists for Europe	5
Mario Draghi	Independent	5
Elisabetta Casellati	Forza Italia	4
Franco Berrino	Independent	2
Sabino Cassese	Independent	2
Primo Di Nicola	Five Star Movement	2
Giancarlo Giorgetti	League	2
Filippo Grassia	Independent	2
Marcello Pera	Independent	2
Others		18
Invalid Votes		13
Blank votes		25
Voters		983
Absentees		26
Total		1,009
Source: Italian Parliament

== Aftermath ==
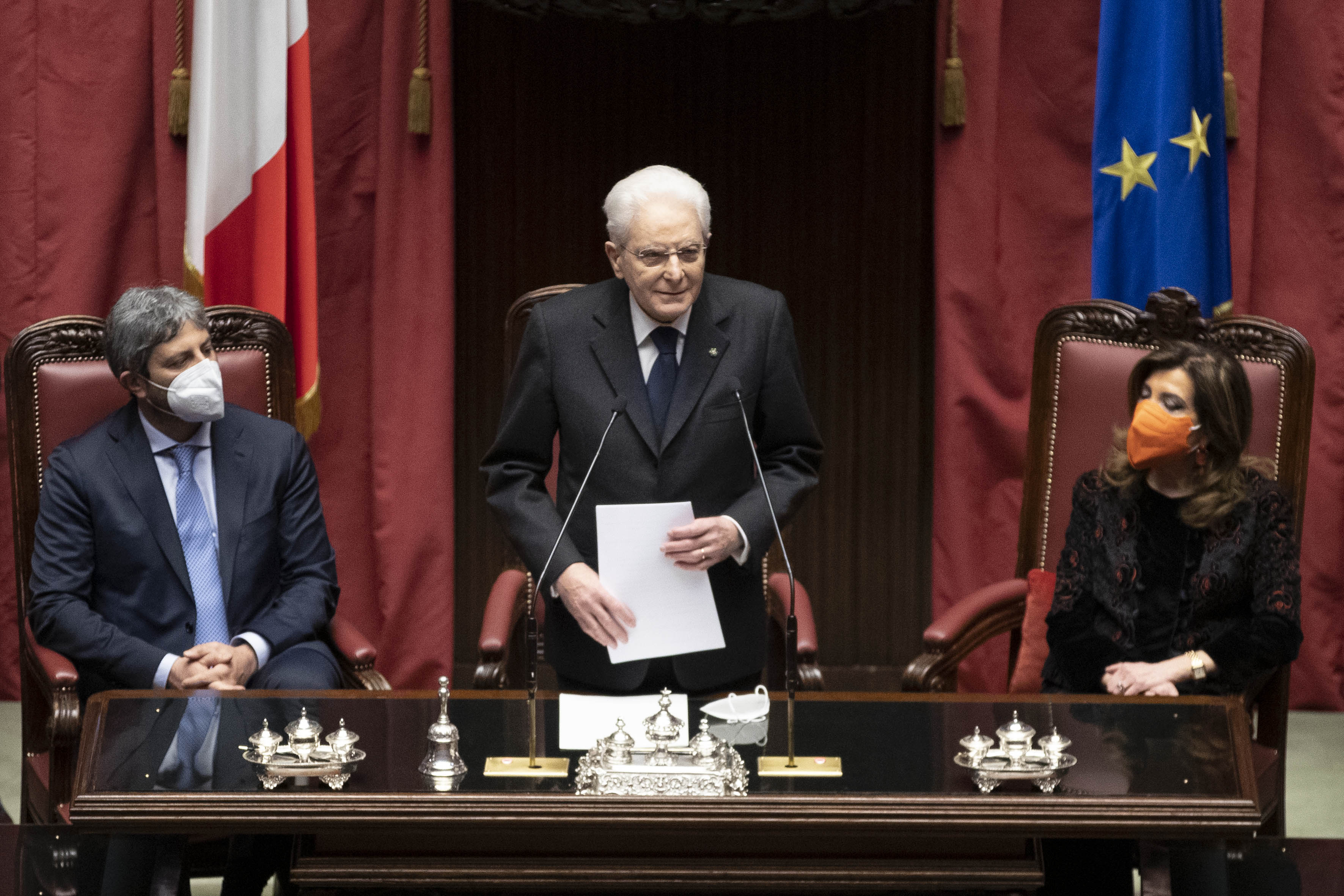
President Mattarella speaking to the parliament on 3 February 2022

On the day of the final ballot, Matteo Salvini and the minister of economic development Giancarlo Giorgetti (Lega) stated that Mario Draghi's government would need a "new phase" after the political events that characterised the presidential election. For The New York Times, Jason Horowitz wrote that Sergio Mattarella's re-election "increased the likelihood that Mr. Draghi, a former president of the European Central Bank, would continue to lead the unity government until scheduled elections in February 2023."

Writing for Reuters, Angelo Amante, Giuseppe Fonte, and Gavin Jones commented that "financial markets are likely to react positively to the status quo, which will see Prime Minister Mario Draghi, who had made clear he hoped to become president himself, continuing as prime minister instead." Draghi said that Mattarella's re-election was "splendid news for Italians" and thanked him for "his decision to go along with the extremely strong will of parliament."

On 3 February, President Mattarella was sworn in for his second term in front of a joint assembly of the parliament. He called for unity, saying: "We still need to work together to strengthen Italy, beyond the current difficulties." He also commented on the Russo-Ukrainian crisis, stating: "We cannot accept that now, without even the pretext of competition between different political and economic systems, the winds of confrontation are once again blowing across a continent that has experienced the tragedies of the First and Second World Wars."

== Reactions ==
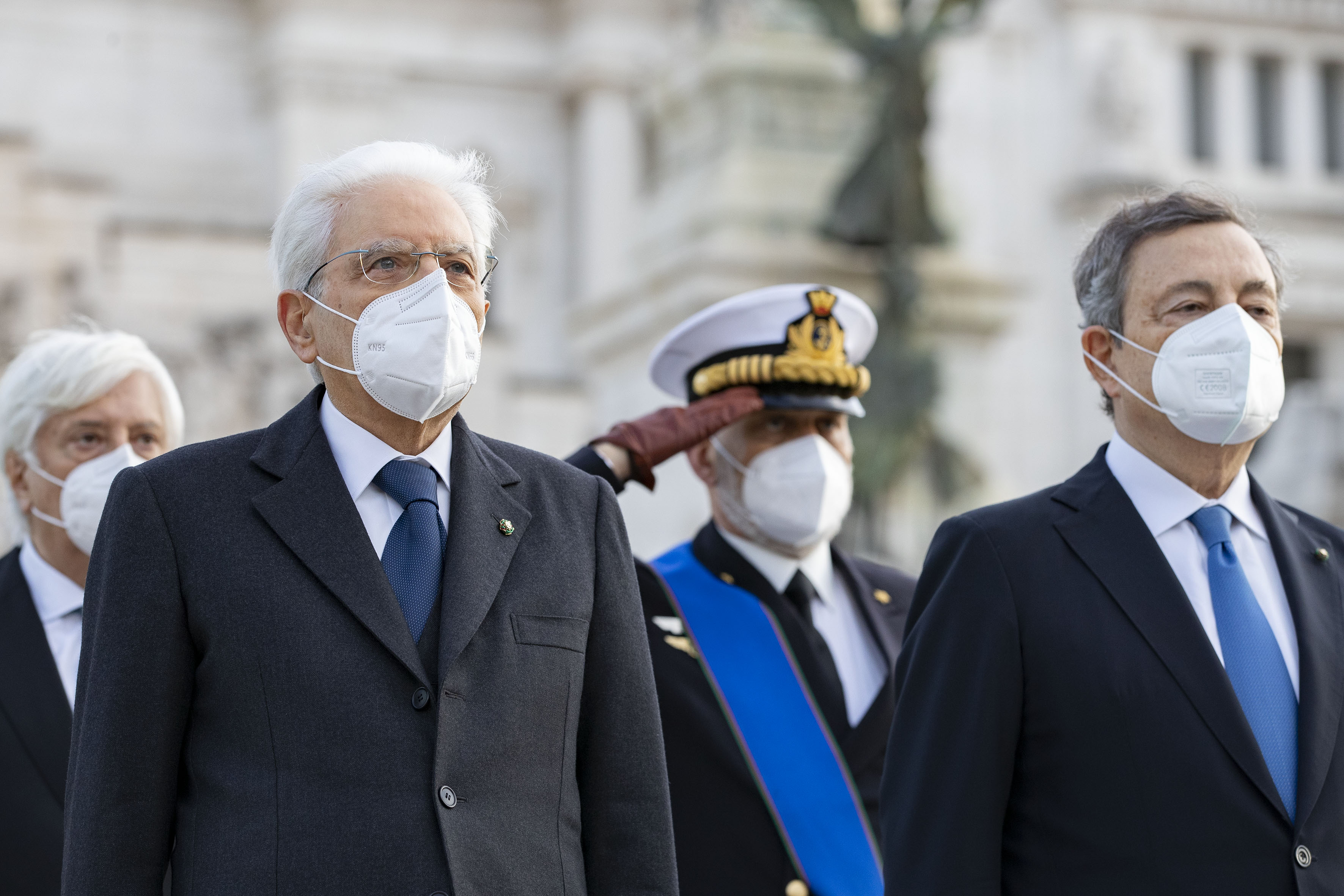
President Mattarella and Prime Minister Mario Draghi on the inauguration day

Members of Italy's governing majority expressed contentment about the results and gratitude to Mattarella. Enrico Letta, leader of the Democratic Party, saw the result as a "victory for everyone" and posted a picture of the pencil he used to vote for Mattarella in the eighth ballot, saying that he would keep it as "a beautiful souvenir", while Forza Italia's Silvio Berlusconi, who was thought to be a possible presidential candidate for the centre-right coalition but withdrew his bid for the presidency a week earlier, praised Mattarella "from whom we know we are asking for a great sacrifice, but we also know that we can ask him in the higher interests of the country." The League's leader Salvini thanked Mattarella, saying that he should "not be perceived as a stopgap president." Giorgia Meloni of the opposition Brothers of Italy posted a video of the sustained applause among deputies upon Mattarella's re-election with the message: "MPs euphoric for not having changed anything and forcing Mattarella to another term. What are they celebrating? That their salary is safe."

United States president Joe Biden welcomed Mattarella's re-election and said he looks forward to "continuing our efforts to further strengthen US-Italy ties, deepen the transatlantic partnership, and address common global challenges." Referring to Mattarella as "dear Sergio", French president Emmanuel Macron posted a message in Italian saying: "I know I can count on your commitment to ensure the friendship between our countries and this united, strong and prosperous Europe that we are building." Ursula von der Leyen, president of the European Commission, congratulated Mattarella in an Italian tweet saying: "Italy can always count on the EU." Pope Francis assured Mattarella of his prayers "so that he may continue to support the dear Italian people in building an ever more fraternal coexistence and encouraging them to face the future with hope."
