= COPASIR =

Italian parliamentary committee about intelligence agencies

Parliamentary Committee for the Security of the Republic (Comitato Parlamentare per la Sicurezza della Repubblica, COPASIR) is a body of the Italian Parliament deputed to survey and oversee the activities of the Italian intelligence agencies.

== History ==
Since the end of World War II, Italian intelligence agencies have been reorganized many times in an attempt to increase their effectiveness and bring them more fully under civilian control. The committee was established as part of a broader reform of the Italian intelligence community, which represented the latest in a long string of government attempts to effectively manage Italy's intelligence agencies.

- In 1977, with Legislative Act n.801 of 24/10/1977, this came after a former chief of SID, Vito Miceli, was arrested for "conspiration against the state" (Golpe Borghese), and the intelligence agencies were reorganized in a democratic attempt. This re-organization mainly consisted of:
  - The split of SID, the intelligence agency at that time, into two separate agencies with different roles: SISDE (the domestic one) and SISMI (the military one).
  - The creation of CESIS, with a coordination role between the two intelligence agencies and the Presidency of the Council of Ministers.
  - The creation of the Parliamentary Committee, COPACO, to oversee the activities of the two agencies.
- Since 1 August 2007, with Legislative Act n.124 of 08/03/2007, following the reform of the Italian intelligence agencies, SISDE, SISMI and CESIS were replaced respectively by AISI, AISE and DIS; the COPACO was renamed COPASIR (Comitato Parlamentare per la Sicurezza della Repubblica, Parliamentary Committee for the Security of the Republic) and granted additional oversight and control powers.

== Mission ==
Following the reform of the Italian intelligence agencies approved on 1 August 2007, COPASIR. has the power to:

- Declassify State Secrets, but only if all members of the Committee agree with unanimity.
- Acquire acts and dossiers from judicial investigations, with the authority to overcome the professional secrecy, both of judicial and banking nature.
- Have free access to intelligence agencies' offices and documentations.

COPASIR is constituted by four Senators and four Deputies, designated proportionally by the presidents of the two Chambers (the Chamber of Deputies and the Senate of the Republic).

=== Current composition ===
Name	Group	Role	House	Took office
Lorenzo Guerini	Democratic Party	President	Chamber of Deputies	21 November 2022
Giovanni Donzelli	Brothers of Italy	Vice President	Chamber of Deputies	21 November 2022
Ettore Rosato	Action – PER	Secretary	Chamber of Deputies	21 November 2022
Marco Pellegrini	Five Star Movement	Member	Chamber of Deputies	21 November 2022
Angelo Rossi	Brothers of Italy	Member	Chamber of Deputies	21 November 2022
Ester Mieli (Note: Former member, Andrea Augello, died on 28 April 2023)	Brothers of Italy	Member	Senate of the Republic	3 July 2024
Claudio Borghi	League	Member	Senate of the Republic	17 November 2022
Enrico Borghi	Italia Viva (Note: Previously a member of the Democratic Party until 26 April 2023)	Member	Senate of the Republic	17 November 2022
Licia Ronzulli	Forza Italia	Member	Senate of the Republic	17 November 2022
Roberto Scarpinato	Five Star Movement	Member	Senate of the Republic	17 November 2022

=== List of presidents ===
Portrait	Name (Born–Died)	Term of office			Party	Legislature
Portrait	Name (Born–Died)	Took office	Left office	Time in office	Party	Legislature
	Claudio Scajola (1948– )	1 August 2007	29 April 2008	272 days	Forza Italia	XV (2006)
	Francesco Rutelli (1954– )	22 May 2008	12 November 2009	1 year, 174 days	Democratic Party	XVI (2008)
	Massimo D'Alema (1949– )	26 January 2010	15 March 2013	3 years, 48 days	Democratic Party	XVI (2008)
	Giacomo Stucchi (1969– )	6 June 2013	22 March 2018	4 years, 289 days	Northern League / League	XVII (2013)
	Lorenzo Guerini (1966– )	18 July 2018	4 September 2019	1 year, 48 days	Democratic Party	XVIII (2018)
	Raffaele Volpi (1960– )	9 October 2019	20 May 2021	1 year, 223 days	League	XVIII (2018)
	Adolfo Urso (1957– )	9 June 2021	12 October 2022	1 year, 125 days	Brothers of Italy	XVIII (2018)
	Lorenzo Guerini (1966– )	6 December 2022	Incumbent	3 years, 346 days	Democratic Party	XIX (2022)
