= Fulvio Martini =

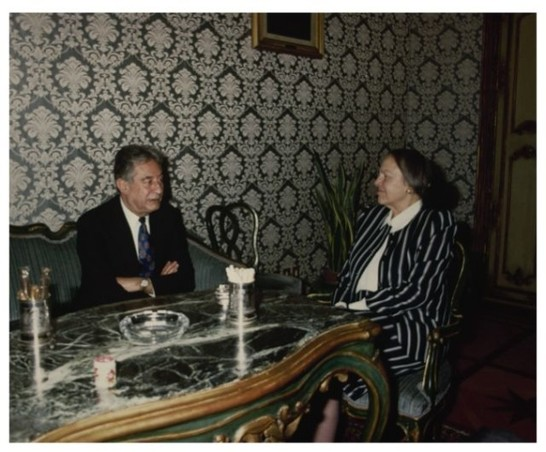
Fulvio Martini with Nilde Iotti, President of the Italian Chamber of Deputies, 1991

Fulvio Martini (26 February 1923 – 15 February 2003) was an Italian Navy admiral and intelligence officer. He was the head of Military Security and Intelligence between 5 May 1984 and 26 February 1991.

== Biography ==
Fulvio Martini was born in Trieste which a few years earlier had been transferred from Austria-Hungary to Italy in the context of the wartime treaty commitments whereby the British and their allies had persuaded Italy to join in the war on the allied side. During the Second World War, he enlisted in the Italian navy. Martini's first assignment was as a junior officer on the ageing battleship Duilio. He continued his naval career after the war ended, serving between 1972 and 1973 as ship's captain on the battle cruiser Vittorio Veneto, at which time the vessel was the flagship of the Italian navy.

His long career in military intelligence began in 1956. He served till 1962 in the naval branch of the military intelligence and status information service ("Servizio Informazioni Operative e Situazione" / SIOS A2). Stationed in the Bosphorus area to monitor movements of the Soviet merchant fleet to and from the Mediterranean, he was involved in providing the Americans with photographs of missile parts being transported to Cuba. In the hands of the Americans, these images played an important part in demolishing General Secretary Kruschev's assertions of the Soviet Union's "innocence" during the Cuban Missile Crisis. After that, he headed up "Department S" (subsequently renamed as the "situation analysis department") of the Military Intelligence Service.

Between 1965 and 1968 he was based in Belgrade as naval attaché to Yugoslavia. Then, till 1977, he continued to work in the "SID" military intelligence service, living through a period of reform for the Italian intelligence services. Shortly after the launch in 1977 of the SISMI and SISDE (reconfigured intelligence services), Martini was given another naval command at sea.

The P2 scandal rose up the political agenda at the end of the 1970s. Slow but inordinate investigation indicated that top SISMI personnel, who had made their careers in its predecessor organisation, the SID, had been members of the discredited lodge. Martini was an experienced intelligence officer untainted by the affair and took charge of the SISMI, purging the organisation of residual fascist elements and others involved in the P2 conspiracies. His scope for manoeuvre was limited by the need to sustain existing structures in response to the country's Cold War obligations, but he nevertheless succeeded in transforming the SISMI into an efficient and modern intelligence service, and lifting from it the shadow of a "secret police" guiding spirit.
