= Italian intelligence agencies =

Italian intelligence agencies, post-WWII

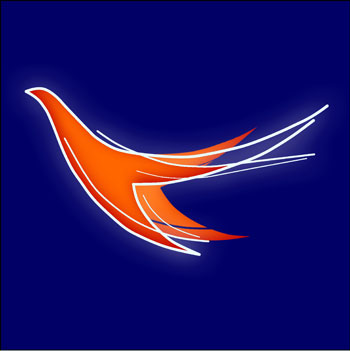
Logo of the Information System for the Security of the Italian Republic

Italian intelligence agencies are the intelligence agencies of Italy. Currently, the Italian intelligence agencies are the Agenzia Informazioni e Sicurezza Esterna (AISE), focusing on foreign intelligence, and the Agenzia Informazioni e Sicurezza Interna (AISI), focusing on internal security. They form part of the Department of Information for Security, which in turn is part of the Presidency of the Council of Ministers. The agencies have been reorganized multiple times since the birth of the Italian Republic in 1946 to attempt to increase effectiveness.

== History ==
=== Military Information Service ===
The Military Information Service, known in Italian as Servizio Informazioni Militare or SIM, was founded on October 15, 1925. It originated from a military information system structure within the Italian Armed Forces. From February 6, 1927, it was placed under the direct control of the Chief of General Staff. Benito Mussolini is said to have changed the leadership frequently as he did not have complete confidence in the service. The SIM was largely focused on France, Austria and Yugoslavia, and was not involved in quelling anti-fascist opposition during Mussolini's reign, which was handled by the Ministry of the Interior and the OVRA.

By January 1934, the SIM had approximately 40 people in service (in addition to informers) and a budget of around two million lire. When Mario Roatta was put in charge of the agency, the budget was doubled to around four million lira.

=== 1970s reorganization ===
In 1974, General Vito Miceli, a former chief of Servizio Informazioni Difesa (SID), was arrested for "conspiracy against the state" after the attempted Golpe Borghese. In 1977, a legislative act reorganized intelligence agencies under civilian control. This re-organization mainly consisted of:

- The split of SID into two separate agencies with different roles: SISDE (the domestic agency for the defence of democratic institutions, run by the Interior affairs ministry) and SISMI (the military secret service, run by the Defence Ministry).
- The creation of CESIS to coordinate and direct the two intelligence agencies under the authority of the Presidency of the Council of Ministers.
- The creation of a parliamentary committee to oversee the activities of the two agencies.

=== Later scandals ===
In October 1990, Prime Minister Giulio Andreotti's public revelation of the existence of Gladio, a stay-behind anti-Communist network supported by NATO, caused another scandal.

The SISMI's chief, Nicolò Pollari, resigned in November 2006 after his indictment in the Abu Omar case, which concerned the kidnapping of Hassan Mustafa Osama Nasr in Milan in 2003. The judiciary investigation into the abduction of Abu Omar uncovered a SISMI-run black operation targeting center-left politician Romano Prodi and a domestic surveillance program involving Telecom.

The SISMI was also implicated in the Niger uranium forgeries scandal, during which SISMI agents transmitted false documents to US President George W. Bush which were used as pretext in the invasion of Iraq.

In August 2007, Italian magistrates searching the SISMI's headquarters found documents proving that the intelligence agency had spied on various European magistrates between 2001 and 2006 who it considered to be carrying a "destabilization" potential. These included the Medel, a European association of magistrates, and as three French judges including Anne Crenier, a former president of the Syndicat de la magistrature French union.

== March 2007 reforms ==
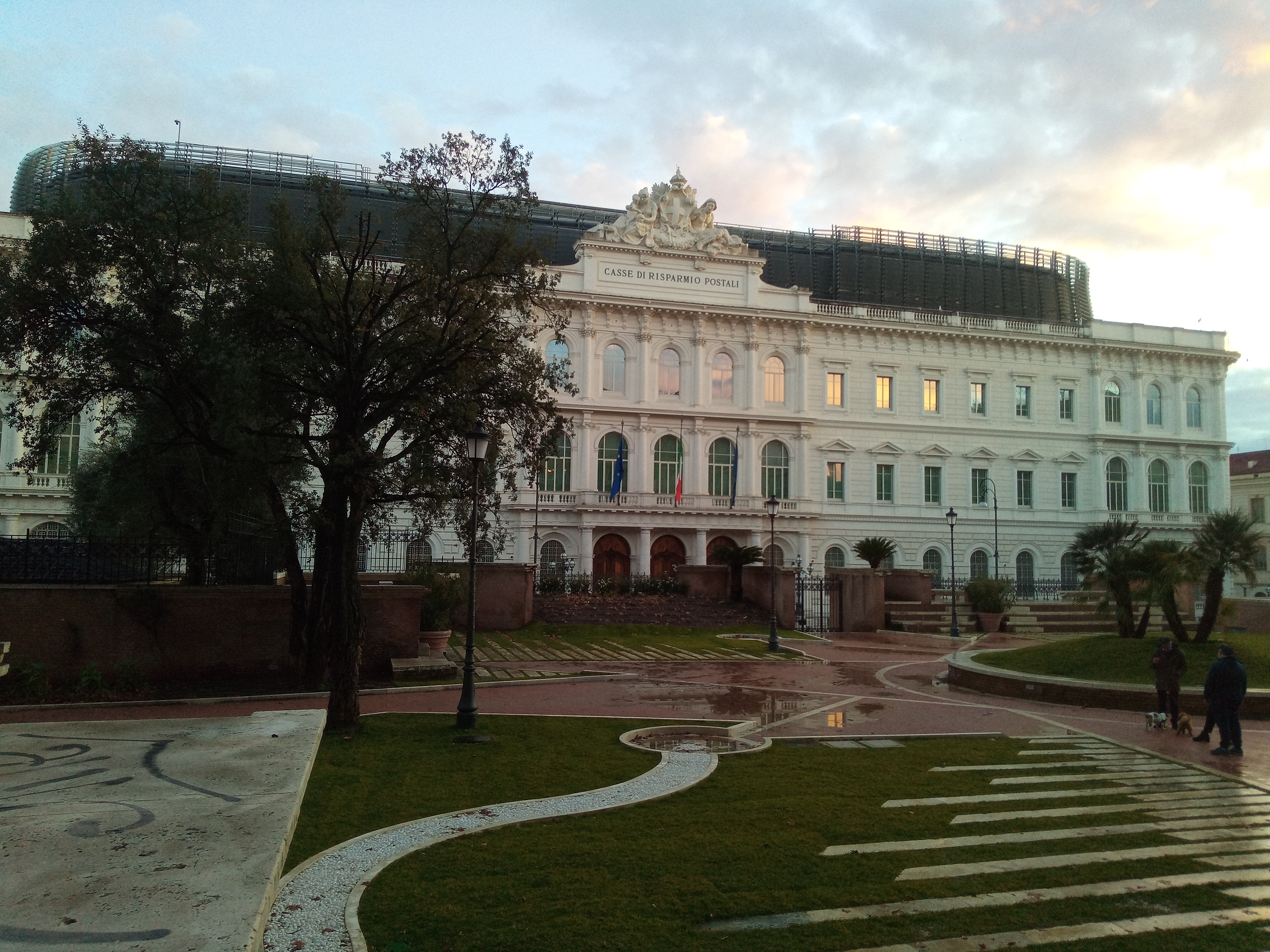
The headquarters of the Italian intelligence agencies in Rome

In March 2007, the center-left government of Romano Prodi created a new "information system for security" called Sistema di informazione per la sicurezza della Repubblica. It introduced far more detailed procedures with regard to state secrets, cooperation with police forces and public administrations, judicial investigation of the conduct of secret service personnel, regulating the procedure for undertaking acts normally deemed illegal, and the acquisition of secret documentation by oversight bodies or judicial authorities. The system placed intelligence agencies more closely under the Prime Minister's supervision, who is responsible for nominating directors and deputy directors of each agency.

The SISDE, SISMI and CESIS were replaced with the Agenzia Informazioni e Sicurezza Interna (AISI), an internal information and security agency, the Agenzia Informazioni e Sicurezza Esterna (AISE), a foreign intelligence and security agency, and Dipartimento delle Informazioni per la Sicurezza (DIS), a security information department. The parliamentary committee overseeing the intelligence agencies (COPASIR) was granted additional oversight and control powers, with the DIS general director acting as secretary.

While the intelligence agencies used to be divided between the Defense Ministry (SISMI) and the Interior Ministry (SISDE), the main division line is now between "internal" and "external" security. The Italian military's new intelligence agency, II Reparto Informazioni e Sicurezza of the Stato maggiore della difesa (RIS), is not integrated into the "information system for security", and is limited to activities of a technical military and military police nature, such as to protect armed force outposts and activities abroad.

According to Statewatch, "the law also envisages the adoption of a regulation including provisions to guarantee the information services' access to the computer archives of public administrations and public utility providers, with technical means of monitoring what personal data was checked after the event." Furthermore, the "intelligence services are forbidden from employing or commissioning advisory or co-operation services from elected politicians at the European, national, regional, and local level, or members of governing bodies or constitutional bodies, judges, religious ministers and journalists."

The DIS opened an investigation office to verify that the activities of the various agencies respect rule of law and to conduct internal investigations. The commission of illegal acts by intelligence officers, excluding license to kill, must be authorised by the Prime Minister or delegated authority, in compliance with a principle of justification for such conduct as part of an authorized operation. In cases of "absolute urgency" that do not allow the normal procedure for authorization to be followed, agency directors may authorize the activities, informing the Prime Minister and DIS "immediately", and explaining the reasons for such a course of action. According to the reforms, the principle of justification is not applicable to actions such as:

Endangering or harming life, physical integrity, individual personality, personal freedom, moral freedom, the health or safety of one or more people.

Authorized operations explicitly exclude ordinary illegal acts in the offices of political parties, regional parliaments or councils, trade union offices, or against professional journalists. Aiding and abetting is allowed, except for cases involving false testimony before judicial authorities, concealing evidence of a crime, or intending to mislead investigations. Three to ten-year prison sentences are envisaged for officers who illegally fix the conditions under which "authorized operations" are granted.

Three to ten-year prison sentences may be incurred for compiling illegal dossiers outside of the intelligence agency's objectives, with secret archives also forbidden.

State secret status may cover documents, news, activities or any other thing. Declaring an object a state secret falls under the prerogative of the Prime Minister, who may do so for fifteen years, renewable to thirty. It may not be applied to activities involving subversion, terrorism or to attacks aimed at causing deaths. The Constitutional Court may not be denied access to documents on the basis of them being state secrets. The Prime Minister can lift state secrets, as well as COPASIR unanimously.

== List ==
- Dipartimento delle Informazioni per la Sicurezza (DIS, Department of Intelligence for the Security)
- Agenzia Informazioni e Sicurezza Esterna (AISE, external intelligence and security agency)
- Agenzia Informazioni e Sicurezza Interna (AISI, internal intelligence and security agency)
- II Reparto Informazioni e Sicurezza of the Stato maggiore della difesa (The department of intelligence and security)

== See also ==
- List of (worldwide) intelligence agencies
