= SISMI =

Military intelligence agency of Italy

Military Intelligence and Security Service
- Servizio per le Informazioni e la Sicurezza Militare; SISMI

- The SISMI coat of arms

Agency overview
- Formed: 24 October 1977
- Preceding agency: SID
- Dissolved: 3 August 2007
- Superseding agency: Agenzia Informazioni e Sicurezza Esterna
- Jurisdiction: Government of Italy
- Minister responsible: Arturo Parisi, Minister of Defence (last)
- Agency executive: Admiral Bruno Branciforte, Director
- Website: serviziinformazionesicurezza.gov.it

Servizio per le Informazioni e la Sicurezza Militare (SISMI; English: Military Intelligence and Security Service, lit. 'Service for the Information of Military Safety') was the military intelligence agency of Italy from 1977 to 2007.

With the reform of the Italian Intelligence Services approved on 1 August 2007, SISMI was replaced by Agenzia Informazioni e Sicurezza Esterna (AISE).

== History ==
Since the end of World War II, Italian intelligence agencies have been reorganized many times (SIM 1900–1949, SIFAR 1949–1965, SID 1965–1977) and last SISDE (civil) and SISMI (military) from 1977 to 2007, in an attempt to increase their effectiveness and bring them more fully under civilian control.

The agency was established as part of a broader reform of the Italian intelligence community, which represented the latest in a long string of government attempts to effectively manage Italy's intelligence agencies.

- In 1977, with Legislative Act n.801, the SISMI was created after a former chief of the SID, Vito Miceli, was arrested in 1974 for "conspiring against the State" (See Golpe Borghese of 1970). Thus, the intelligence agencies were reorganized in a democratic attempt. This re-organization mainly consisted of:
  - The split of SID, the intelligence agency at that time, into two separate agencies with different roles: SISDE (the domestic one) and SISMI (the military one).
  - The creation of CESIS, with a coordination role between the two intelligence agencies and the Presidency of the Council of Ministers.
  - The creation of the Parliamentary Committee, COPACO, to oversee the activities of the two agencies.
- Since 1 August 2007, with Legislative Act n.124 of 08/03/2007, following the reform of the Italian intelligence agencies, SISDE, SISMI and CESIS were replaced respectively by AISI, AISE and DIS, and the COPACO was granted additional oversight and control powers.

The first director of the service was Giuseppe Santovito (1978–1981), succeeded by General Nino Lugaresi, who was SISMI's director from 1981 to 1984; he testified on Gladio. General Nicolò Pollari was SISMI's second-last director; he resigned on 20 November 2006 after being indicted in the Abu Omar case, so Prime Minister Romano Prodi replaced him with Admiral Bruno Branciforte.

Admiral Bruno Branciforte was SISMI's last director, in charge until 3 August 2007. With the reform of the Italian Intelligence Services approved on 1 August 2007, the military intelligence was eliminated, and the Italian intelligence was divided into internal and foreign.

== Mission ==
SISMI was responsible for intelligence and security activities involving the military defence of Italy and for the integrity of the Italian State.

SISMI reported to the Italian Ministry of Defense and operated both inside and outside of Italy's borders. It was feasible that domestic Intelligence and Security, which normally fell under SISDE's jurisdiction (since it reported to the Ministry of the Interior), also involved SISMI, unless the security threat came from organized crime.

Its duties included:

- clearing activities with the Prime Minister;
- nominating the Director of the Service and his assistants under CIIS supervision.

== The directors ==
- General Giuseppe Santovito (First director, 13 January 1978 – August 1981)
- General Nino Lugaresi (August 1981 – 4 May 1984)
- Admiral Fulvio Martini (5 May 1984 – 26 February 1991)
- General Sergio Luccarini (27 February 1991 – 19 August 1991)
- General Luigi Ramponi (19 August 1991 – 9 August 1992)
- General Cesare Pucci (10 August 1992 – 12 July 1994)
- General Sergio Siracusa (12 July 1994 – 3 November 1996)
- Admiral Gianfranco Battelli (4 November 1996 – 30 September 2001)
- General Nicolò Pollari (1 October 2001 – 20 November 2006)
- Admiral Bruno Branciforte (21 November 2006 – 3 August 2007)

== Motto and logo ==
SISMI's motto, as seen on its logo, was "Arcana intellego" (Latin for "Understanding hidden things"). The verb "intellego", which literally means "I comprehend", was chosen because «it evokes the noble root of intelligence, a discipline aimed at unravelling mysteries and holds in itself a constant tension directed to its final goal: knowledge».

Its coat of arms was granted by a decree of the President of the Republic dated 28 January 2004.

== Recent controversies ==
=== Nicola Calipari and Giuliana Sgrena ===
In 2005, Nicola Calipari, a high-ranking SISMI hostage negotiator, was killed at a U.S. Army checkpoint in Baghdad by Mario Lozano, purportedly after a communication breakdown between the Italian intelligence community and the occupying forces.

=== Yellowcake forgery ===
In 2005, SISMI was implicated in the yellowcake forgery scandal. The forged documents purporting to detail an Iraqi purchase of yellowcake uranium from Niger were given to a "cutout" named Rocco Martino by a colonel in SISMI, Antonio Nucera. The head of SISMI, after claiming his agency received the documents from external sources, met with then-Deputy National Security Advisor, Stephen Hadley, on 9 September 2002.

Reportedly, the SISMI director vouched for the documents' authenticity at the meeting; as a result, the White House attempted to insert a reference to uranium from Africa in President Bush's upcoming address to the United Nations, scheduled for 12 September 2002. The CIA removed the reference 24 hours before the address was given. In bypassing the CIA, Pollari ignored the established protocol for contacts between Italian and American intelligence agencies.

President Bush later used the same discredited information when delivering his January 2003 State of the Union address.

=== Imam Rapito ===
In July 2006, the Italian judiciary power issued arrest warrants for several SISMI officials involved in the joint CIA-SISMI operation resulting in the unlawful extraordinary rendition of Hassan Mustafa Osama Nasr, which SISMI Director Pollari had formally denied in testimony before a committee of the national legislature. Among these were:

- former Deputy Director Marco Mancini
- General Gustavo Pignero, agency chief for Northern Italy
- Mancini's aide Giuseppe Ciorra
- Pio Pompa, an aide to SISMI Director Nicolò Pollari (he was indicted for "abusive interception" against the vice-president of La Repubblica, Giuseppe D'Avanzo)
- former Trieste Station Chief Lorenzo Pillinini
- former Padua Station Chief Marco Iodice
- Milan Station Chief Maurizio Regondi

Nicolò Pollari himself would later be indicted on 5 December 2006 and sentenced to 10 years in jail on February 12, 2013. Marco Mancini was sentenced to 9 years in jail. They appealed against this ruling.

On 16 February 2007, an Italian judge ordered twenty-six Americans and five Italians (including Pollari) to stand trial over the case on 8 June 2007.

As part of the judiciary investigation, a SISMI-run black operation targeting centre-left politician Romano Prodi and a vast domestic surveillance program was uncovered. Pompa prevailed upon the newspaper Libero to print allegations that Prodi, when serving as European Commissioner, had authorized the CIA prison flights via Italy. Targeted in the surveillance program were La Repubblica reporters Giuseppe D'Avanzo and Carlo Bonini, who broke the yellowcake forgery story.

=== Spying on magistrates ===
Italian magistrates searching the SISMI's headquarters in August 2007 found documents proving that the intelligence agency had spied over various European magistrates between 2001 and 2006, whom it considered carrying a "destabilization" potential. These included the Medel, a European association of magistrates, as well as three French judges, including Anne Crenier, former president of the Syndicat de la magistrature French union, who is married to Italian magistrate Mario Vaudano who works at the European Anti-Fraud Office (OLAF).

== See also ==
- Italian intelligence agencies
- SIOS
