= Agenzia Informazioni e Sicurezza Esterna =

Foreign intelligence service of Italy

External Intelligence and Security Agency
- Agenzia informazioni e sicurezza esterna AISE
- Coat of arms of the AISE

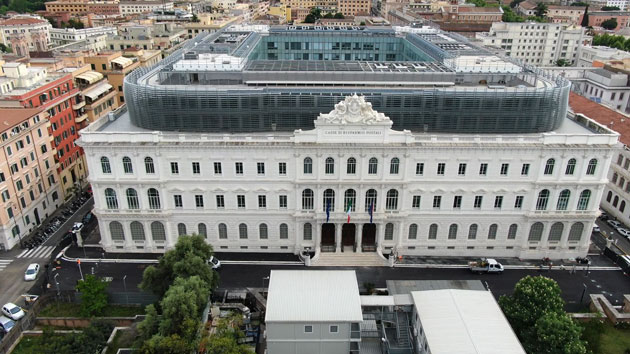
- Italy's intelligence headquarters in Rome

Agency overview
- Formed: 28 August 2007; 18 years ago
- Preceding agency: SISMI
- Jurisdiction: Government of Italy
- Headquarters: Rome, Palazzo delle casse di risparmio postali, Piazza Dante 25
- Minister responsible: Giorgia Meloni, Prime Minister of Italy
- Agency executive: General Giovanni Caravelli, Director
- Website: https://www.sicurezzanazionale.gov.it

Footnotes
- Presidency of the Council of Ministers; Ministry of Defence; Ministry of Foreign Affairs; Dipartimento delle Informazioni per la Sicurezza

The Agenzia Informazioni e Sicurezza Esterna (AISE; Italian: External Intelligence and Security Agency) is the foreign intelligence service of Italy.

AISE was established in 2007 to replace the Military Intelligence and Security Service (SISMI) as part of reforms of Italy's intelligence services. The agency operates outside of Italy to protect national security and interests mainly through the use of HUMINT and is responsible to the prime minister of Italy through the Presidency of the Council of Ministers.

The current director of AISE is General Giovanni Caravelli.

== History ==
Since the end of World War II, Italian intelligence agencies have been reorganized many times:

- SIM 1900–49,
- SIFAR 1949–65,
- SIOS 1949–97,
- SID 1965–77,
- SISMI (military branch), and SISDE (civil branch), Executive Committee for Intelligence and Security (CESIS) 1977–2007

in an attempt to increase their effectiveness and bring them more fully under civilian control.

AISE was founded in 2007 with the reform of the intelligence agencies provided by the Italian 3 August 2007, n. 124 law: new agencies were formed as the Department of Information for Security (DIS) and the Internal Intelligence and Security Agency (AISI).

The reform drastically changed the structure of Italian intelligence, as compared to the 24 October 1977, n. 801 law, it now does not divide the responsibilities between civilian and military structures (i.e. SISDE and SISMI), but along territorial spheres of competence:

- AISI only within Italy and
- AISE only abroad,
- DIS (Dipartimento delle Informazioni per la Sicurezza - "Department of Security Information")

aligning Italy with how other countries arrange their services. By law, it is a similar case with the Central Intelligence Agency in the U.S.

== Tasks ==
The agency as provided by Article 6 of Law 124/2007, has the task of researching and developing all the necessary information to defend the independence, integrity and security of Italy from threats from abroad, including the implementation of international agreements. AISE also performs activities in the field of counter-proliferation of nuclear materials or materials found to be strategic, and information activities for security outside Italian national territory, to protect Italian political, military, economic, scientific and industrial interests, as well as detecting outside the national territory espionage activities directed against Italy and activities aimed at damaging national interests.

== Territorial jurisdiction ==
AISE can perform operations only outside Italian national territory, as well as Italian embassies abroad. In fact, the law expressly forbids AISE to operate in Italy, except if this is strictly necessary for the conduct of its operations. In this case, the rule requires that the operations in the country are only to be done in collaboration with the AISI and the director-general of the DIS shall ensure the necessary forms of coordination and linkage information in order to avoid overlapping of functions or territory.

== Organization ==
Law 124/2007 provides that AISE responds to the president of the Council of Ministers, as the authority entrusted with senior management and overall responsibility for information policy for Italian security. Nevertheless, the AISE shall promptly and continuously work with the Ministry of Defence, the Ministry of Foreign Affairs and the Ministry of the Interior.

AISE is run by a director appointed by the president of the Council of Ministers. The appointment has a maximum duration of four years and is renewable only once. The director of AISE consistently refers to the president on the activities of the Council of Ministers or to a delegated authority, if this is established, through the director-general of the DIS. It reports directly to the president of the Council of Ministers in cases of urgency, or where other special circumstances so require, informing the director-general of the DIS without delay.

The director of AISE is flanked by one or more deputy directors, appointed and dismissed by the president of the Council of Ministers after consultation with the director. The other positions within the agency are appointed by the director of AISE.

== Directors ==
- Vice Admiral Bruno Branciforte (4 August 2007 – 4 February 2010), former director of SISMI.
- General Adriano Santini (5 February 2010 – 19 February 2014)
- Paolo Scarpis (ad interim, 20 February 2014 – 18 April 2014)
- General Alberto Manenti (19 April 2014 – 22 November 2018)
- General Luciano Carta (23 November 2018 – 18 May 2020)
- General Giovanni Caravelli (18 May 2020 – present)

== The RIS ==
The same 2007 law recognizes the Department of Information and Security of the Defence Staff (RIS) which relies on "tasks of general information, technical military and military police, and in particular any business information useful in order to protect principals and the activities of the Armed Forces abroad. The RIS operates in close liaison with the AISE."

AISE and the RIS compete in exclusive areas of general intelligence and counterintelligence in particular.

== See also ==
- Italian intelligence agencies
