= Anna Maria D'Ascenzo =

Italian prefect

Prefect of Grosseto
- In office 1 September 1993 – 1 March 1998
- Preceded by: Felice Vecchione
- Succeeded by: Giuseppe Amoroso

Prefect of Perugia
- In office 2 March 1998 – 12 June 2000
- Preceded by: Maria Teresa Cortellessa
- Succeeded by: Gianlorenzo Fiore

Personal details
- Born: 17 July 1940 (age 85); Asmara, Italian East Africa; Kingdom of Italy

Anna Maria D'Ascenzo (born 17 July 1940) is an Italian official and the first woman to serve as a prefect in the history of Italy.

== Life and career ==
After graduating in Political Science, D'Ascenzo began her career at the Ministry of the Interior in February 1967, initially working at the General Directorate for General Administration and Personnel Affairs, and later at the Directorate of Civil Protection and Fire Services. From 29 December 1990—the effective date of her appointment as Prefect of the Republic—she served as head of personnel for the firefighters, holding the position of central director of personnel at the General Directorate of Civil Protection and Fire Services.

Appointed prefect of Grosseto in September 1993, D'Ascenzo became the first woman to serve as prefect in an Italian province.

Subsequently, from March 1998 to June 2000, she was the prefect of Perugia.

D'Ascenzo then assumed the role of head of the Department of Civil Protection at the Presidency of the Council of Ministers from June 2000 to September 2001, and served as director general of civil services at the Ministry of the Interior from October 2001 to December of the same year. She was later appointed head of the Department for Civil Liberties and Immigration and, in 2006, of the Department of Firefighters, Public Rescue, and Civil Defense. She retired in August 2008.

On 27 December 2004, she was appointed Knight Grand Cross of the Order of Merit of the Italian Republic.

== Works ==
- D'Ascenzo, Anna Maria (2023). Prevenire, prevedere, provvedere. Rome: Albatros Il Filo.
