= Giacomo Stucchi =

Italian politician, member of the Northern League

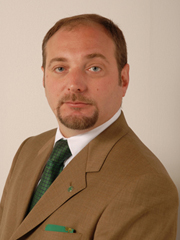

President of COPASIR
- In office 6 June 2013 – 22 March 2018
- Preceded by: Massimo D'Alema
- Succeeded by: Lorenzo Guerini

Member of the Senate
- In office 15 March 2013 – 22 March 2018

Member of the Chamber of Deputies
- In office 9 May 1996 – 15 March 2013

Personal details
- Born: 20 February 1969 (age 57) Bergamo, Italy
- Party: Northern League
- Education: University of Bergamo
- Profession: Politician

Giacomo Stucchi (born 20 February 1969) is an Italian politician, member of the Northern League.

== Biography ==
Stucchi was elected to the Chamber of Deputies uninterruptedly from 1996 to 2008. In those years, Stucchi has been a member of the EU policies Committee and of the Constitutional Affairs Committee.

In March 2013, he is elected to the Senate and in June he is elected president of the COPASIR, the Parliamentary Committee for the Intelligence and Security Services and for State Secret Control, deputed to survey and oversee the activities of the Italian intelligence agencies.

After 22 years of uninterrupted presence in Parliament, he is no longer nominated for the 2018 general elections, since he has been excluded from the League lists.

Stucchi is politically considered to be very close to former President of Lombardy Roberto Maroni.
