= CESIS =

Former Italian government committee that coordinated intelligence

Executive Committee for Intelligence and Security Services
- Comitato Esecutivo per i Servizi di Informazione e Sicurezza
- CESIS Logo

Agency overview
- Formed: 24 October 1977
- Jurisdiction: Government of Italy
- Agency executive: Lieutenant General Giuseppe Cucchi, Secretary General
- Website: serviziinformazionesicurezza.gov.it

Comitato Esecutivo per i Servizi di Informazione e Sicurezza (Executive Committee for Intelligence and Security Services) was an Italian government committee whose mission was the coordination of all the intelligence sector, and specifically between the two civilian and military intelligence agencies (respectively, SISDE and SISMI), with the aim to report all the relevant information collected by it to the political Authorities, represented by the Presidency of the Council of Ministers.

With the reform of the Italian Intelligence Services approved on 1 August 2007, CESIS was replaced by DIS.

== History ==
Since the end of World War II, Italian intelligence agencies have been reorganized many times in an attempt to increase their effectiveness and bring them more fully under civilian control.

The committee was established as part of a broader reform of the Italian intelligence community, which represented the latest in a long string of government attempts to effectively manage Italy's intelligence agencies.

- In 1977, with Legislative Act n.801 of 24/10/1977, this came after a former chief of SID, Vito Miceli, was arrested for "conspiration against the State" (See Golpe Borghese), and the intelligence agencies were reorganized in a democratic attempt. This re-organization mainly consisted of:
  - The split of SID, the intelligence agency at that time, into two separate agencies with different roles: SISDE (the domestic one) and SISMI (the military one).
  - The creation of CESIS, with a coordination role between the two intelligence agencies and the Presidency of the Council of Ministers.
  - The creation of the Parliamentary Committee, COPACO, to oversee the activities of the two agencies.
- Since 1 August 2007, with Legislative Act n.124 of 08/03/2007, following the reform of the Italian intelligence agencies, SISDE, SISMI and CESIS were replaced respectively by AISI, AISE and DIS, and the COPACO was granted additional oversight and control powers.

CESIS's first Secretary General was Prefect Gaetano Napoletano, the last one was Lieutenant General Giuseppe Cucchi.

== Mission ==
CESIS was a collective body, chaired by the President of Council, and composed of the main political, public security, military and intelligence agency top authorities:

- The President of Council or, by proxy, another government authority.
- The Secretary General of the President of the Council of Ministers' Office.
- The Secretary General of the Ministry of Foreign Affairs.
- The Chief of the General Staff of the Italian Defence.
- The Chief of Police (In Italy, the top authority of the Polizia di Stato).
- The Commanding Generals of the Arma dei Carabinieri and the Guardia di Finanza (in Italy, the two top authorities of the Arma dei Carabinieri and the Guardia di Finanza).
- The Directors of SISDE and SISMI.
- The Secretary General of CESIS.

The Secretary General of CESIS was not only a member, but, as the chief of General Secretariat of CESIS (see below), he also acted as the Secretary of this body.

== The General Secretariat ==
The General Secretariat, the Office of the Secretary General, was a focal point which, amongst other things:

- Acted as a link interface between the information collected by the two intelligence agencies and the political Authority.
- Acted as a filter interface between the intelligence sector and the other public administration departments.
- Coordinated and directed intelligence agencies' personnel.
- Decided which foreign intelligence and security agencies SISDE and SISMI were allowed to establish contacts with.
- Through the UCSI (Central Security Office), a structure located within the General Secretariat of CESIS, it:
  - authorized persons and companies to deal with classified information.
  - attended to the managements of the State Secrets.

UCSI's role is to protect the Italian secret of State.

By means of the General Secretariat, the President of Council ensures the unity of political leadership and management of the intelligence agencies.

The Secretary General exerted, by proxy, the role of ANS ("National Security Authority"), peculiar of the President of Council.

== The Secretaries General ==
- Gaetano Napoletano (1977-1978)
- Walter Pelosi (1978-1981)
- Orazio Sparano (1981-1987)
- Giuseppe Richero (1987-1991)
- Francesco Paolo Fulci (1991-1993)
- Giuseppe Taormina (1993-1994)
- Umberto Pierantoni (1994-1996)
- Francesco Berardino (1996-2001)
- Fernando Masone (2001-2003)
- Emilio del Mese (2003 - 20 November 2006)
- Giuseppe Cucchi (21 November 2006 - 3 August 2007)
