= Flora Frate =

Italian politician (born 1983)

Member of the Italian Chamber of Deputies
- In office 23 March 2018 – 13 October 2022

Personal details
- Born: July 3, 1983 (age 42) Naples, Italy
- Party: Italia Viva (since 2021)
- Other political affiliations: M5S (2018–2020); A (2020–2021)
- Profession: Teacher

Flora Frate (born 3 July 1983) is an Italian politician who sat in the Italian Chamber of Deputies from 2018 to 2022.

== Biography ==
Frate is a sociologist, and graduated with honours in social and territorial policies at the Department of Social Sciences of the University of Naples Federico II. She is a teacher of philosophy and human sciences, president of the non-profit cultural association Medea-Fattoria sociale, in 2013 she was a speaker at the international conference on the sociology of disability.

She is a director of the Italy-USA Foundation, where she is responsible for the department for academic and educational projects.

== Political career ==
Frate was elected to the Chamber of Deputies with the 5 Star Movement in the 2018 Italian general election, and was a member of the Culture, Science and Education Commission and subsequently of the Public and Private Work Commission. She also joined the parliamentary intergroup "Innovation" and "For women, rights and equal opportunities".

In 2019, she was Frate was critical of the formation of the Conte II Cabinet.

=== Expulsion from the Five Star Movement ===
On 31 January 2020 she was expelled from the Five Star Movement due to her positions on school and reimbursements in relation to the lack of transparency of the private fund established by the movement's management in 2019. She was also expelled from the M5S for failure to return her salary.

On 26 November 2020, she announced her entry into Action and joined the mixed Group of Action-+Europe-Italian Radicals, from which, however, she left a few months later on May 25, 2021.

On 23 December 2021, together with the MP Maria Teresa Baldini, she joined Italia Viva.

She was not re-elected in the 2022 Italian general election.
