= Giuseppe Moles =

Italian politician (born 1967)

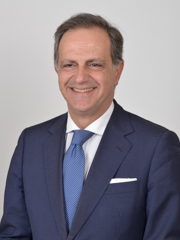
Moles in 2018

Rocco Giuseppe Moles (born 7 January 1967) is an Italian politician from Forza Italia.

== Political career ==
Moles is the Undersecretary to the Presidency of the Council of Ministers with responsibility for publishing in the Draghi Cabinet. He received two votes in the first round of the 2022 Italian presidential election.
