= Maria Teresa Baldini =

Italian politician, physician and basketball player

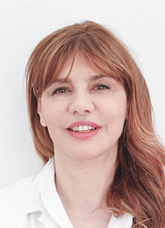
- Maria Teresa Baldini in 2019

Member of the Chamber of Deputies
- In office 27 June 2019 – 12 October 2022

Personal details
- Born: 22 January 1961 (age 65) Pietrasanta, Italy
- Party: Lega (since 2026)
- Other political affiliations: Us Moderates (2023-2026); Coraggio Italia (2021-2022); Italia Viva (2021-2022); Forza Italia (2020-2021); Brothers of Italy (2018-2020); Fuxia People (2012-2017)
- Education: University of Milan
- Occupation: Politician, basketball player, surgeon

Maria Teresa Baldini (born 22 January 1961) is an Italian politician from Italia Viva. She was formerly a basketball player and surgeon.

== Biography ==
She was a member of the Italy women's national basketball team. She was a candidate for Fuxia People in the 2016 Milan municipal election.

On 23 December 2021, together with the MP Flora Frate, she joined Italia Viva. She was a candidate in the 2022 Italian presidential election.

In 2026, she joined the Liberal Christian Democrats, an association federated with Lega, and was appointed regional coordinator for Lombardy.
