= Carlo Nordio =

Italian magistrate and prosecutor (born 1947)

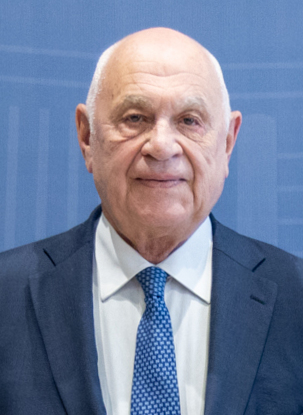
- Nordio in 2025

Minister of Justice
- Incumbent
- Assumed office 22 October 2022
- Prime Minister: Giorgia Meloni
- Preceded by: Marta Cartabia

Member of the Chamber of Deputies
- Incumbent
- Assumed office 13 October 2022
- Constituency: Treviso

Personal details
- Born: 6 February 1947 (age 79) Treviso, Italy
- Party: Brothers of Italy (since 2022)
- Other political affiliations: Italian Liberal Party (1967–1977); Italian Liberal Party (2017–2022)
- Height: 1.77 m (5 ft 10 in)
- Spouse: Mariapia Manuel (since 1978)
- Children: Sara Nordio
- Education: University of Padua
- Profession: Magistrate

Carlo Nordio (born 6 February 1947) is an Italian politician, former magistrate and prosecutor, who has served as Italian Minister of Justice since 22 October 2022, in Giorgia Meloni's government. In the 2022 Italian presidential election he was the candidate of Brothers of Italy for President of Italy. In the 2022 Italian general election he was elected to the Chamber of Deputies.

== Professional career ==
Carlo Nordio in 1997

Carlo Nordio was born in Treviso, in the Veneto region, in 1947. He is a member of the Nordio family. He became a magistrate in 1977, and was later appointed deputy prosecutor of Venice. In the 1980s, he led investigations on the Venetian Red Brigades. In the early 1990s, Nordio was among the protagonists of the famous Mani Pulite investigation.

During his later career, he was a consultant to the Parliamentary Commission for Terrorism and chairman of the Ministerial Commission for the reform of the penal code. Nordio served as deputy prosecutor of Venice until his retirement in 2017, dealing with economic crimes, corruption and medical liability. After his retirement, he collaborated with numerous legal journals and newspapers including Il Tempo, Il Messaggero, and Il Gazzettino. Since 5 December 2018, he has been a member of the board of directors of the Luigi Einaudi Onlus Foundation.

== Political career ==
On 24 January 2022, Brothers of Italy's leader Giorgia Meloni proposed Nordio as her candidate in the 2022 Italian presidential election. Nordio rejected the candidacy, citing lack of political experience. However, he was confirmed as a possible candidate of the centre-right coalition on the following day. On 29 January, Brothers of Italy voted him when all the other main parties proposed a re-election of incumbent president Sergio Mattarella.

On the occasion of the 2022 referendum on justice, he promoted the reasons for the yes, joining, as one of its major exponents, the Committee for the yes.

In the early political elections of 25 September 2022 he was a candidate for the Chamber of Deputies in the single-member constituency of Treviso for the center-right and as the leader of the Brothers of Italy in the multi-member Veneto. Nordio was elected in the uninominal with 56.2%.

On 22 October 2022, Nordio was appointed Minister of Justice in the government led by Giorgia Meloni, who became the first woman to serve as Prime Minister of Italy.

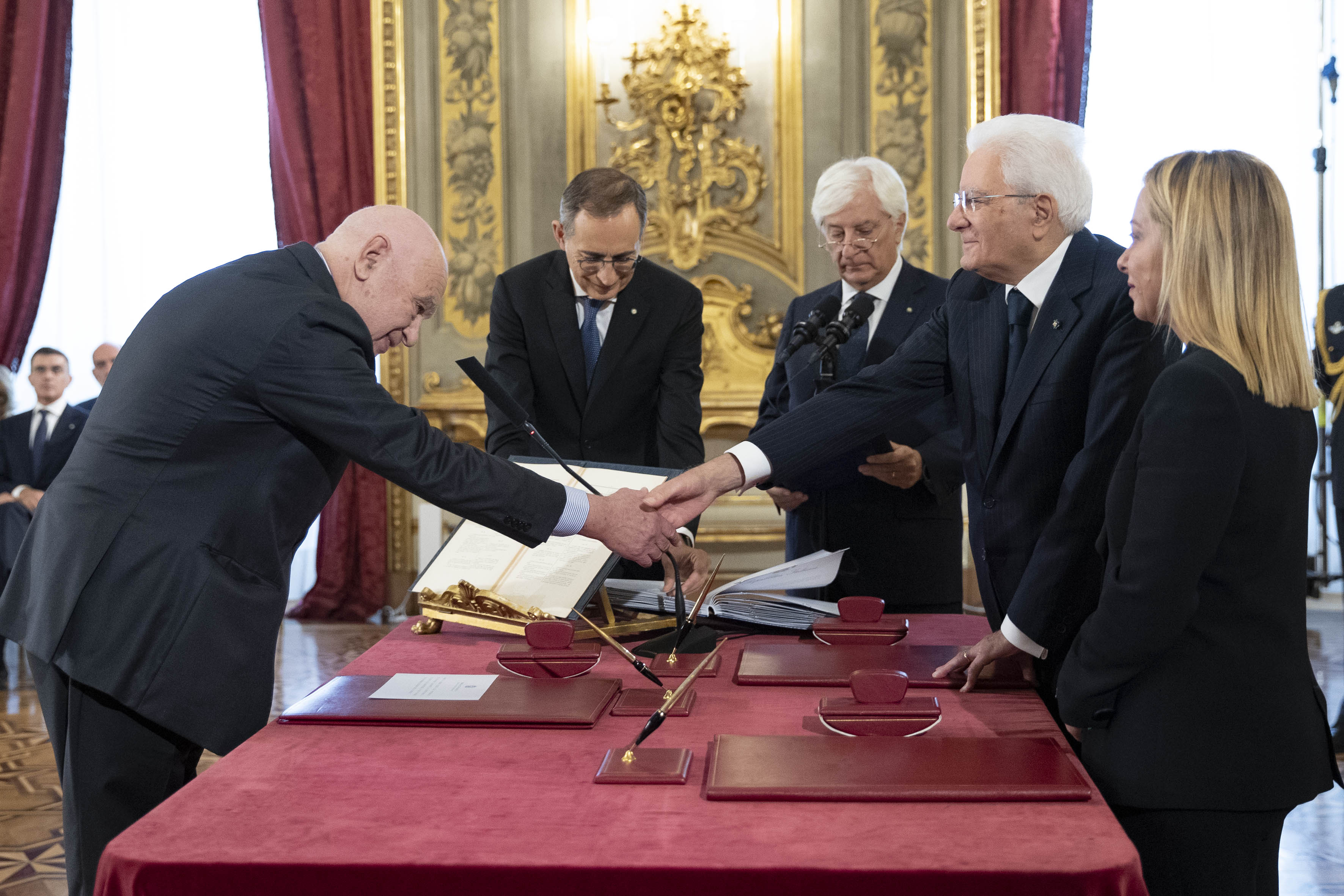
Carlo Nordio swearing in as Minister of Justice

The constitutional law reform that concerned the failed 2026 Italian constitutional referendum was named after Nordio after he proposed it as Minister of Justice.

In 2026, Nordio's ministry came into conflict with the National Magistrates' Association (ANM) over an administrative inspection of the Juvenile Court of L'Aquila concerning the famiglia nel bosco child custody case, with the ANM alleging potential interference with judicial independence.

== Political positions ==
Nordio considers himself a conservative liberal, a pro-Europeanist and an Atlanticist, while having an admiration for Winston Churchill. In 1967 he joined the Italian Liberal Party, but he had to leave the party upon becoming a magistrate. After retiring, he joined the new Italian Liberal Party, of which he was a member of the committee of the guarantors until 2022.

Nordio meets Igor Grosu, President of the Moldovan parliament

He was one of the promoters of the constitutional reform project for the introduction in Italy of the separation of the professional careers of criminal judges and prosecutors. He stated that he agreed with the project of Freemason Licio Gelli and the Masonic Lodge Propaganda Due, even though he had never known the so called "Plan of Democratic Rebirth".

== Controversies ==
Throughout his judicial and political career, Nordio has been involved in several controversies, mainly related to his public positions on justice reform and his institutional role as Minister of Justice.

One of the most debated issues concerns his long‑standing support for the separation of judicial and prosecutorial careers, a reform strongly opposed by the National Magistrates’ Association (ANM). Critics argued that Nordio’s proposals could weaken the unity of the judiciary and reduce internal guarantees of independence. Supporters, on the other hand, viewed the reform as a necessary modernization of the Italian justice system.

Nordio also faced criticism for statements in which he expressed agreement with some principles contained in Licio Gelli’s “Democratic Rebirth Plan,” despite clarifying that he had never met Gelli nor had any connection with the P2 Masonic Lodge. Opponents claimed that any positive reference to the plan was inappropriate for a magistrate and later for a minister, while Nordio maintained that his remarks concerned only specific institutional reforms unrelated to P2’s political agenda.

Nordio and Nizet at Council European Convention Center in 2024

A significant institutional controversy emerged in 2026, when the Ministry of Justice ordered an administrative inspection at the Juvenile Court of L’Aquila regarding the "famiglia nel bosco" child custody case. The ANM publicly criticized the initiative, alleging a potential interference with judicial independence and warning against executive overreach. The Ministry rejected these accusations, stating that the inspection was a standard administrative procedure aimed at verifying compliance with protocols.

Nordio’s constitutional reform proposal, commonly referred to as the “Nordio reform", also generated debate. The reform, which was later rejected in the 2026 constitutional referendum, was criticized by several constitutional scholars who argued that it risked altering the balance between branches of government. Supporters claimed it would streamline judicial procedures and strengthen guarantees for defendants.

== Electoral history ==
Election	House	Constituency	Party	Votes	Result
2022	Chamber of Deputies	Veneto 1 – Treviso	FdI	115,222	Elected

== Works ==
- Giustizia, Guerini e Associati, 1997
- Emergenza Giustizia, Guerini e Associati, 1999
- Crainquebille di Anatole France, Liberilibri, 2002
- In attesa di giustizia, Guerini e Associati, 2010
- Operazione Grifone, Mondadori, 2014
- Overlord, Mondadori, 2016
- La stagione dell'indulgenza, Guerini e Associati, 2019
- Giustizia. Ultimo atto. Da Tangentopoli al crollo della magistratura, Guerini e Associati, 2022
- Una nuova giustizia, Guerini e Associati, 10 January 2026.

Political offices
Preceded by Marta Cartabia	Italian Minister of Justice; 2022–present	Incumbent
