= SISDE =

Italian domestic intelligence agency

Intelligence and Democratic Security Service
- Servizio per le Informazioni e la Sicurezza Democratica; SISDE

- SISDE Logo

Agency overview
- Formed: 24 October 1977
- Preceding agency: SID
- Dissolved: 2007
- Superseding agency: AISI
- Jurisdiction: Government of Italy
- Minister responsible: Minister of the Interior

Servizio per le Informazioni e la Sicurezza Democratica (Intelligence and Democratic Security Service) was the domestic intelligence agency of Italy.

With the reform of the Italian Intelligence Services approved on 1 August 2007, SISDE was largely replaced by AISI.

== History ==
Since the end of World War II, Italian intelligence agencies have been reorganized many times in an attempt to increase their effectiveness and bring them more fully under civilian control.

The agency was established as part of a broader reform of the Italian intelligence community, which represented the latest in a long string of government attempts to effectively manage Italy's intelligence agencies.

In 1977, with Legislative Act n.801 of 24/10/1977, this came after a former chief of SID, Vito Miceli, was arrested for "conspiration against the State" (See Golpe Borghese), and the intelligence agencies were reorganized in a democratic attempt. This re-organization mainly consisted of:

- The split of SID, the intelligence agency at that time, into two separate agencies with different roles: SISDE (the domestic one) and SISMI (the military one).
- The creation of CESIS, with a coordination role between the two intelligence agencies and the Presidency of the Council of Ministers.
- The creation of the Parliamentary Committee, COPACO, to oversee the activities of the two agencies.

In spite of these changes, in the early 1980s, several members of SISDE were involved in the Propaganda 2 masonic lodge scandal.

In 1992, SISDE member Bruno Contrada, who had led some intelligence cells in Palermo, was arrested for involvement with the Sicilian mafia. The service was also involved in the massacre of judge Paolo Borsellino in 1992. Investigations held by police telecommunication expert Gioacchino Genchi attested the presence of an undercover SISDE seat in the Castello Utveggio, a Liberty style castle on the Monte Pellegrino, a mountain overlooking Palermo and Via D'Amelio, the street in which Borsellino was killed. The circumstance was discovered by analyzing the phone calls of a mafia boss, Gaetano Scotto, who called a phone number owned by SISDE in the castle. After the revelation, Genchi was removed from investigations and the Castello Utveggio case archived by the Tribunal of Caltanissetta. Borsellino had also met Contrada in the Ministry of Interiors, in Rome, two days before his death.

Since 1 August 2007, with Legislative Act n.124 of 08/03/2007, following the reform of the Italian intelligence agencies, SISDE, SISMI and CESIS were replaced respectively by AISI, AISE and DIS, and the COPACO was granted additional oversight and control powers. SISDE's last director was prefect Franco Gabrielli.

== Mission ==
SISDE's mission was targeted to the defence of the State and its Institutions against whoever tries to threaten them, and from all subversion attempts.

It shared responsibility for this task with SISMI, except in matters involving organized crime.

SISDE reported to the Ministry of the Interior, which attended to its regulations, supervised its activities, and designated its directors.

== The directors ==
- Giulio Grassini (1977–1981)
- Emanuele De Francesco (1981–1984)
- Vincenzo Parisi (1984–1987)
- Riccardo Malpica (1987–1991)
- Alessandro Voci (1991–1992)
- Angelo Finocchiaro (1992–1993)
- Domenico Salazar (1993–1994)
- Gaetano Marino (1994–1996)
- Vittorio Stelo (1996–2001)
- Mario Mori (2001 - 15 December 2006)
- Franco Gabrielli (16 December 2006 - 3 August 2007)

== Motto and logo ==
SISDE's motto, as seen on its logo, was "Per aspera ad veritatem" (Latin for "Through difficulties towards the truth"). It was depicted for the first time only in the second version of its official logo, in 1982, and it was maintained in the third and last version, adopted in 2002.

It was chosen because, «by means of the balance between tradition and innovation, [it] emphasizes with full meaning the will of the Institution to address the challenges of modern society, characterised by new and emerging asperities and instabilities, with the purpose to defend national security with that kind of knowledge offering which founds the mission of every modern intelligence system».
