= Centro Intelligence Interforze =

Military intelligence service of the Italian Armed Forces

Joint Intelligence Centre
- Centro Intelligence Interforze

Agency overview
- Preceding agency: SIOS
- Jurisdiction: Government of Italy
- Headquarters: Rome
- Parent agency: Italian Armed Forces

The Centro Intelligence Interforze (CII; Italian for Joint Intelligence Centre) is the military intelligence agency of the Italian Armed Forces.

It was created in 2000 by merging the intelligence and security services of three branches of the Italian Armed Forces (navy, army and air force). Part of the staff also came from the fourth branch (the Carabinieri).
