= Nino Di Matteo =

Italian magistrate (born 1961)

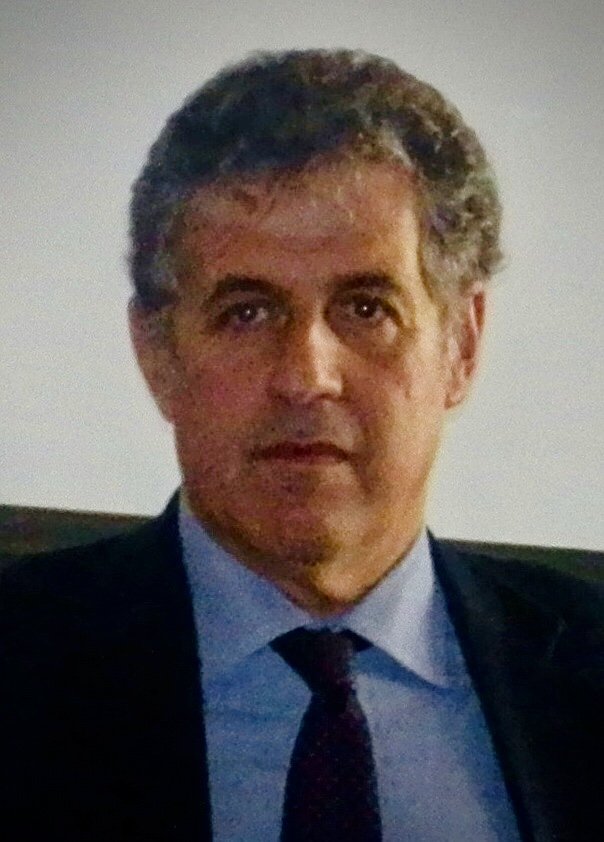
- Di Matteo in 2015

Member of the High Council of the Judiciary
- In office 10 October 2019 – 24 January 2023

Personal details
- Born: Antonino Di Matteo; 26 April 1961 (age 65) Palermo, Italy
- Education: University of Palermo
- Occupation: Magistrate

Antonino "Nino" Di Matteo (born 26 April 1961) is an Italian magistrate and prosecutor. Since 2012, he is serving as president of the National Magistrates Association of Palermo and from 2019 to 2023 he has been a member of the High Council of the Judiciary. Due to his anti-mafia activity, Di Matteo has been under guard since 1993.

== Biography ==
Di Matteo was born in Palermo, Sicily, in 1961. He obtained a classical high school diploma from the Gonzaga Institute and graduated in law from the University of Palermo. He entered the judiciary in 1991 as deputy prosecutor at the Anti-mafia division of Caltanissetta. Having become a prosecutor in Palermo in 1999, he began to investigate the mafia massacres in which Giovanni Falcone, Paolo Borsellino and their guards were killed, as well as the murders of Rocco Chinnici and Antonino Saetta.

In 2019, he was elected member of the High Council of the Judiciary.
