= Roberto Cassinelli =

Italian lawyer and politician

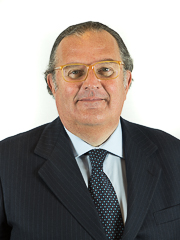

Judge of the Constitutional Court of Italy
- Incumbent
- Assumed office 19 February 2025
- Appointed by: Italian Parliament

Member of the Chamber of Deputies
- In office 23 March 2018 – 12 October 2022
- In office 29 April 2008 – 14 March 2013

Member of the Senate
- In office 20 April 2017 – 23 March 2018

Personal details
- Born: Roberto Nicola Cassinelli; 10 December 1956 (age 69) Genoa, Italy
- Party: PLI (till 1994); Forza Italia (1994-2009); PdL (2009-2013); Forza Italia (since 2013)
- Education: University of Milan
- Profession: Lawyer; Politician

Roberto Cassinelli (born 10 December 1956) is an Italian politician and lawyer, Judge of the Constitutional Court of Italy since 2025.

== Studies and professional life ==
Cassinelli was born in Genoa, and attended the catholic college Vittorino da Feltre in the same city. Then he graduated in law at University of Milan.
He works as a lawyer, pleading at the Supreme Court of Cassation and he has been a member of the bar association at Genoa court of justice.

He is legal consultant and assistant of Italian and European leading banks, industrial and commercial groups, service companies and public authorities.

He is, and has been, director, auditor, judicial and extraordinary commissary in several companies.

== Political life ==
Cassinelli joined very young the Italian Liberal Party (PLI), of which his father, Giorgio, was National vice president.

With PLI he was elected at the Genoa town council, in 1981, 1985 and 1990.

As one of the founders of the political movement Forza Italia in Liguria, he was Regional Vice Secretary from 1994 to 2006, and Genoese Town Commissioner from 2005 and 2007.

The 2007 Forza Italia congress elected him Genoese Town Secretary.

At the 2008 general elections he has been elected at the Chamber of Deputies with the new political movement People of Freedom (Il Popolo della Libertà, Pdl), in which Forza Italia and National Alliance (Alleanza Nazionale, AN) met under the leadership of Silvio Berlusconi.

He is a member of the Commission of Justice at the Chamber of Deputies.

His activity as a Member of Parliament principally focuses on Justice, It law and net neutrality, self-employment.

He is one of the founders of the "Intergruppo Parlamentare 2.0" (Parliamentary Group 2.0), whose aim is to introduce the innovation themes into the Italian Parliament.

He is the head of the National Department on commercial and bankruptcy law for People of Freedom.
