= Dipartimento delle Informazioni per la Sicurezza =

Dipartimento delle informazioni per la sicurezza
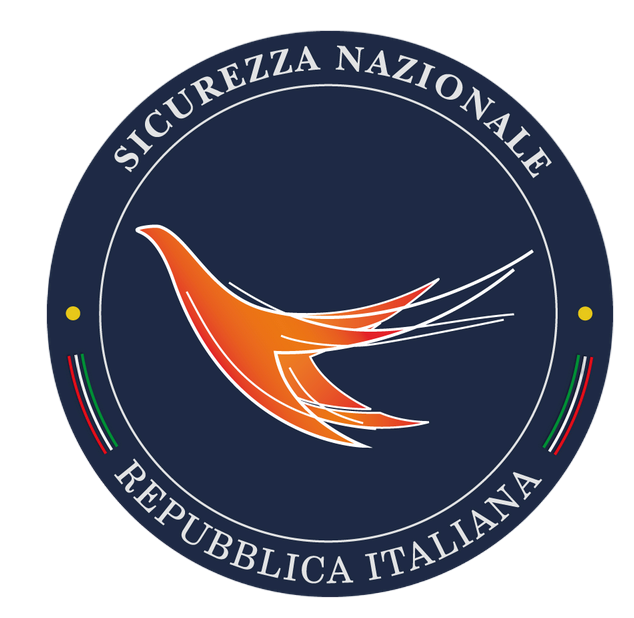
- Logo of Sistema di informazione per la sicurezza della Repubblica
- Active: 28 August 2007 – present
- Country: Italy
- Role: Intelligence unit
- Part of: Presidency of the Council of Ministers
- Headquarters: Piazza Dante 25, Rome
- Anniversaries: 3 August
- Website: https://www.sicurezzanazionale.gov.it/

Commanders
- General Director: Vittorio Rizzi (since 15 January 2025)

The Dipartimento delle Informazioni per la Sicurezza (DIS, 'Department of Information for Security') is a department of the Presidency of the Council of Ministers of Italy, instituted in 2007 as part of the reform of the Italian security services. The department is part of Sistema di informazione per la sicurezza della Repubblica (information system for security). It is currently headed by prefect Vittorio Rizzi.

The department is divided into several functional areas. The Central Security Office (Ufficio Centrale per la Sicurezza) deals specifically with administrative protection of state secrets, including the granting or withdrawal of security clearance to individuals and organisations, the Central Archives Office (Ufficio Centrale degli Archivi) coordinates and manages the data in the possession of the Italian secret services, and the Training School (Scuola di Formazione) is responsible for the training of government and civilian staff.

== History ==
DIS was established with law n. 124 of 3 August 2007, published on the Gazzetta Ufficiale n. 187 of 13 August 2007, related to the reform of Italian secret services.

Since that period, CESIS (whose functions had been adsorbed by DIS), SISMI and SISDE have been replaced by DIS, AISI and AISE.

== Tasks and functions ==
DIS oversees the activities of AISE and AISI on the correct application of the dispositions issued by the Italian President of the Council of Ministers or a Delegated Authority, as well as in the field of administrative tutelage of classified informations; it manages the promotion activities and the spreading of the culture about security and institutional communication and it addresses for the unitary management of personnel in the various structures.

DIS carries out different tasks: it coordinates the information activity for security, verifying also the results collected from the activities of AISE and AISI. It is constantly informed about the competent operations of information services for the security and transmits the informations and reports from these services, armed and police forces, State administrations, public and private research entities to the Prime Minister.

The department promotes and ensures the informative exchange between AISE, AISI and police forces; it communicates to the Prime Minister about the acquisition from the informative exchanges and the results of periodical reunions. These informations are transmitted, under disposition of the Prime Ministerand after consulting the Comitato interministeriale per la sicurezza della Repubblica (CISR, 'Inter-ministerial Committee for the Security of the Republic'), to public administrations or entities interested to the acquisition of security informations. It elaborates, along with AISE and AISI, the acquisition plan of human and material resources and of every other resource useful for the intelligence activities, to submit for the approval of the Prime Minister.

While leaving intact the exclusive competences of AISE and AISI regarding the elaboration of the related operative research plans, DIS elaborates strategical analysis or related to particular situations, formulates estimations and previsions based on the sectorial analytical contributions of AISE and AISI. Furthermore, DIS elaborates, also according to informations and reports of other agencies or entities, global analysis to submit to al CISR, as well as projects of informative research on which the Prime Minister decides, after consulting CISR.

== Structure ==
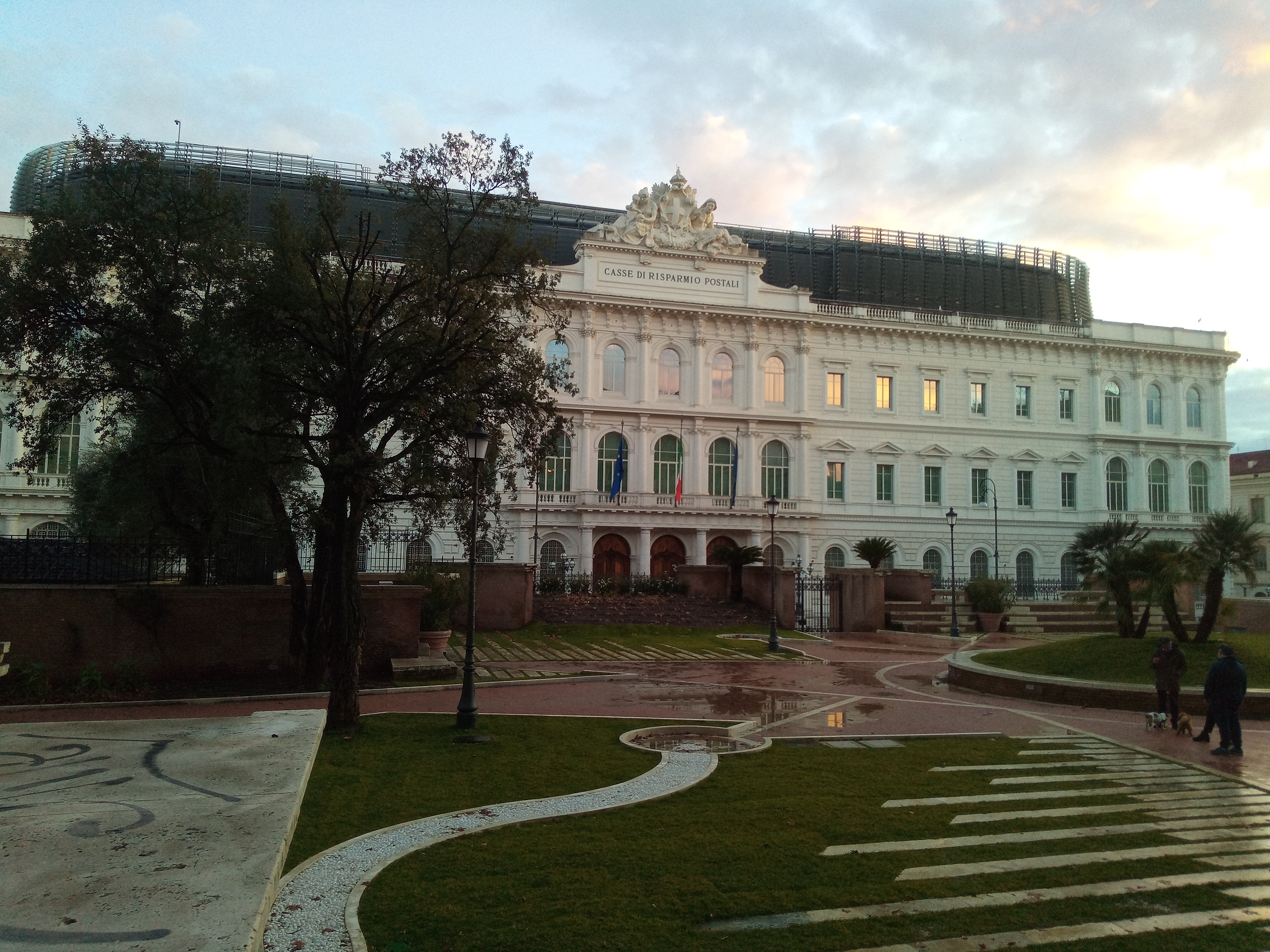
Headquarters of the DIS, Rome

The department has general functions compared to the two operative agencies and it works through the following offices:

- Ufficio centrale per la segretezza (UCSe, Central Office for Secrecy) – it deals specifically with the administrative tutelage of the secret of State and security classifications, releasing or cancelling the security permit which allows people to access to informations with a classification higher than "confidential"
- Ufficio centrale degli archivi (UCA, Central Office of Archives) – it coordinates, disciplines and controls the management of data owned by Italian secret services
- Ufficio centrale ispettivo (UCI, Central Inspective Office) – it controls AISE and AISI through inspectors, verifying the compliance of the information activities for security to laws and regulations, as well as to directives and disposition of the Prime Minister. UCI does also internal investigations on members or former members of the informative organizations under request of COPASIR. Under authorization of the Prime Minister or the Delegate Authority, inspectors do internal investigations about specific episodes or behaviours occurred within AISE or AISI
- Scuola di formazione ('Training School') – it deals with the training of operators of DIS, AISE and AISI. Established with law 124/2007, it avails of civil teachers and operates on the promotion and spreading of the culture of security, starting collaborations with similar institutes of the public administration, universities, study centers, think net e think tank both in Italy and in other countries.

== Organization ==
DIS directly depends on the Prime Minister, expecting the case in which the PM delegates his function to a leader of the government, known as Autorità delegata per la sicurezza della Repubblica (Delegated Authority for Security of the Republic). Bodies are established by law n. 124 of 3 August 2007. The regulation of the functioning has been issued with the Decree of the President of Council of Ministers (DPCM) n. 2 of 26 October 2012, while the one related to the juridical and economical status has been issued with DPCM n. 1 of 23 March 2011.

Both the Prime Minister and the Delegated Authority, if established, use the DIS in function of their competences, with the purpose of ensuring the full unity in planning the informative research of the Information System for the security, as well as in analysis and operative activities of intelligence services.

=== General director ===
The general direction of DIS is entrusted to a first level manager o equated belonging to the State administration, whose nominee and revocation are exclusive made by the Prime Minister, after consulting the CISR.

The assignment has a maximum duration of four years and it is renewable for only one time. According to law, DIS director is the direct referent of the Prime Minister and the Delegated Authority, if established. The director is hierarchically and functionally superordinate to DIS staff and offices established within the same department. The Prime Minister, after consulting the DIS general director, appoints one or more deputy directors; the general director entrusts the other tasks in the field of the department, with the exception of the tasks whose assignment is due to the Premier.

The director of DIS has also the function of secretary of the CISR.

=== Inspective office ===
According to law 124/2007, the regulation guarantees full judgment autonomy and independence for inspectors in the performance of their control duties, and unless a specific authorization from Prime Minister or the Delegated Authority, if established, inspection must not interfere with the ongoing operations. Inspectors are selected according to specific selection tests and an appropriate formation. Furthermore, the transfer of personnel from the inspective office to the Intelligence services is not allowed. Inspectors, after obtaining an authorization from the Prime Minister or the Delegated Authority, can access to all the acts collected by the Intelligence System for the Security and DIS, and they can acquire through the DIS General director other informations from public and private entities.

The inspective office can perform, with the authorization of Prime Minister and also under request of DIS General director, internal investigations on specific episodes and conducts occurred within the Intelligence System for the Security.

== General directors ==
- General Giuseppe Cucchi (28 August 2007 – 15 June 2008)
- Prefect Gianni De Gennaro (15 June 2008 – 11 May 2012)
- Ambassador Giampiero Massolo (11 May 2012 – 29 April 2016)
- Prefect Alessandro Pansa (29 April 2016 – 22 November 2018)
- General Gennaro Vecchione (22 November 2018 – 12 May 2021)
- Ambassador Elisabetta Belloni (12 May 2021 – 15 January 2025)
- Prefect Vittorio Rizzi (15 January 2025 – present)

== See also ==
- Italian intelligence agencies
- SISMI
- CESIS

== Bibliography ==
- "LEGGE 3 agosto 2007, n. 124 -Sistema di informazione per la sicurezza della Repubblica e nuova disciplina del segreto". Normattiva (in Italian).
- Mosca, Carlo; Gambacurta, Stefano; Scandone, Giuseppe; Valentini, Marco (2008). I Servizi di informazione e il segreto di Stato (Legge 3 agosto 2007, n. 124). Milan: Giuffrè. ISBN 978-88-14-14724-1.
