= Enzo Fasano =

Italian politician (1951–2022)

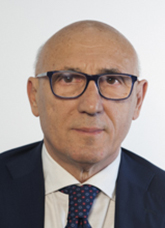
- Fasano in 2018

Member of the Chamber of Deputies of Italy
- In office 23 March 2018 – 23 January 2022
- Succeeded by: Rossella Sessa
- Constituency: Campania 2
- In office 30 May 2001 – 27 April 2006

Personal details
- Born: Vincenzo Fasano; 2 September 1951 Salerno, Italy
- Died: 23 January 2022 (aged 70) Salerno, Italy
- Party: MSI (until 1995); AN (1995–2009); PdL (2009–2013); FI (since 2013)

Vincenzo Fasano (2 September 1951 – 23 January 2022) was an Italian politician. A member of National Alliance and Forza Italia, he served in the Chamber of Deputies from 2001 to 2006 and again from 2018 to 2022. He died of cancer in Salerno on 23 January 2022, at the age of 70.

== Biography ==
After a long career as a political activist in the Italian Social Movement(MSI), with which he served as a city councilor in Salerno from 1985 to 1990, in 1995 he joined Gianfranco Fini’s “Fiuggi Turn,” which led to the dissolution of the MSI and its merger into the National Alliance (AN), on whose ticket he ran in the 1995 regional elections in Campania in support of the center-right candidate Antonio Rastrelli (politician), and was elected to the Campania Regional Council from the Salerno district with 7,405 preferential votes. He was subsequently appointed councilor with responsibility for Education, Cultural Promotion, Museums and Libraries, Youth Policy, the Labor Market, Emigration, and Immigration in the Campania regional government headed by Rastrelli, remaining in office until 1997.

He ran again in the 2000 Campania regional elections, receiving 7,652 votes but failing to win re-election.

In the 2001 general election, he ran for the Chamber of Deputies (Italy) in the Battipaglia electoral district, backed by the Casa delle Libertà as an AN candidate, and was elected deputy with 46.56% of the vote, defeating the candidates from L'Ulivo, Gianni Francesco Mattioli (36.56%), Renato Santese of European Democracy(8.29%), and Gennaro Persico of the Lista Di Pietro (3.28%).During the 14th legislature, he served on the 13th Agriculture Committee (2001), the 14th European Union Policies Committee (2001–2003), the 11th Public and Private Employment Committee (2003–2006), and the Supervisory Committee for the Cassa Depositi e Prestiti (2001–2006) .

In the 2006 general election, he ran for the Senate of the Republic (Italy) as the sixth candidate on the National Alliance’s list in the Campania district; however, he finished second among those who were not elected.

In the 2008 general election, he ran again for the Senate on the The People of Freedom ticket (an electoral list that primarily united AN and Forza Italia (1994)) in the Campania district, in the 18th position on the list, and this time was elected to the Senate as the last of the elected members.

He was re-elected to the Senate in the 2013 general election. On November 16, 2013, following the suspension of The People of Freedom party’s activities, he joined Forza Italia (2013).

In the 2018 general election, he was re-elected to the Chamber of Deputies (Italy) on the Forza Italia (2013) ticket in the Campania 2 constituency.

He died on January 23, 2022, in Salerno, at the age of 70, just a few hours before the first round of voting in the election for President of the Republic, due to cancer, which he had been battling for some time. He was succeeded by Rossella Sessa, the first of the unelected candidates in the Campania 2 constituency.
