= Elisabetta Belloni =

Italian diplomat

Elisabetta Belloni OMRI
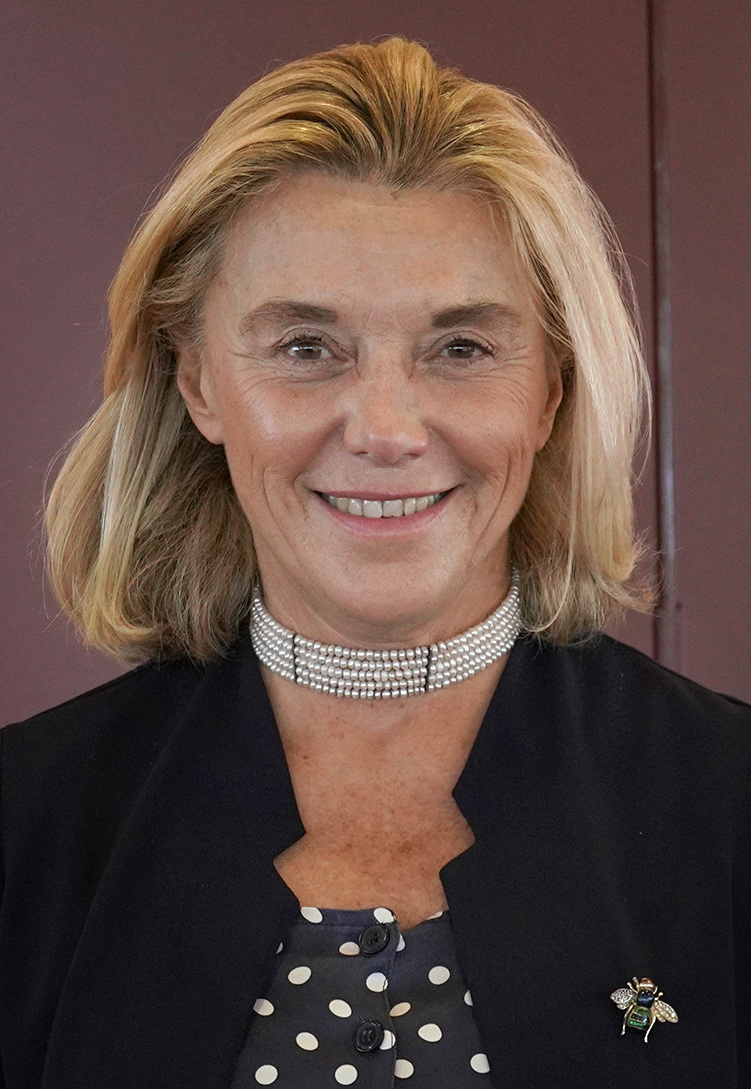
- Belloni in 2020

Director of the Department of Information for Security
- In office 12 May 2021 – 15 January 2025
- Prime Minister: Mario Draghi; Giorgia Meloni
- Preceded by: Gennaro Vecchione
- Succeeded by: Vittorio Rizzi

Secretary-General of the Ministry of Foreign Affairs
- In office 5 May 2016 – 12 May 2021
- Preceded by: Michele Valensise
- Succeeded by: Ettore Francesco Sequi

Personal details
- Born: 1 September 1958 (age 68) Rome, Italy
- Party: Independent
- Spouse: Giorgio Giacomelli (died 2017)
- Education: Luiss Guido Carli
- Occupation: Diplomat

Elisabetta Belloni (Italian pronunciation: [elizaˈbɛtta belˈloːni]; born 1 September 1958) is an Italian diplomat and civil servant, Director of the Department of Information for Security from 2021 to 2025.

== Biography ==
Graduated in Political Science at Luiss Guido Carli University in 1982 with a thesis on international negotiation techniques, Belloni embarked on a diplomatic career in 1985. She has held positions in Italian embassies and representations permanent offices in Vienna and Bratislava, as well as in the Directorates General of the Ministry of Foreign Affairs. In particular, from 1993 to 1996 she was First Secretary of the Italian diplomatic representation to international organizations. After returning to Rome, she worked briefly in the Russia Office before being promoted in 2000 to the secretariat of the Directorate for European Countries. In 2001 she was appointed Head of the Office for Central and Eastern European Countries and finally, since 2002, Head of the Secretariat of the Undersecretary of State for Foreign Affairs Roberto Antonione.

From November 2004 to June 2008, she directed the Crisis Unit of the Ministry of Foreign Affairs. She was Director-General of Development Cooperation from 2008 to 2013, while from January 2013 to June 2015 she was Director-General for Resources and Innovation.

In February 2014, she was promoted to rank ambassador; since June 2015, she held the position of Chief of Staff of the Minister of Foreign Affairs Paolo Gentiloni. Following the resignation from the diplomatic career of Ambassador Michele Valensise, then Secretary-General of the Ministry of Foreign Affairs, in April 2016 she was appointed to replace him and took office on 5 May. She left the Ministry on 12 May 2021, being appointed by Prime Minister Mario Draghi as Director of the Department of Information for Security.

In May 2018, Belloni's name was presented by the press, together with the economist Lucrezia Reichlin, as a possible candidate to receive the mandate of Prime Minister of the 18th legislature. In January 2022, towards the end of Sergio Mattarella's term, she was put forward as a candidate to the Presidency of Italy. the She has been professor of Development Cooperation at the Luiss Guido Carli.

== Honours ==
Order of Merit of the Italian Republic 1st Class / Knight Grand Cross – 1 June 2017

Government offices
Preceded by Michele Valensise	Secretary-General of the Ministry of Foreign Affairs; 2016–2021	Succeeded by Ettore Francesco Sequi
Preceded by Gennaro Vecchione	Director of the Department of Information for Security; 2021–2025	Succeeded by Vittorio Rizzi
