= Magistrats Européens pour la Démocratie et les Libertés =

Organization

European Judges for Democracy and Liberty
- Magistrats Européens pour la Démocratie et les Libertés
- Founded: 1985

Magistrats Européens pour la Démocratie et les Libertés (MEDEL; English: European Judges for Democracy and Liberty) is a European association of judges and public prosecutors, set up in 1985 to promote a progressive vision of justice in Europe.

MEDEL has 22 member organizations from 13 European countries.

MEDEL holds observer status with the Council of Europe, and participates in activities of the Consultative Council of European Judges (CCJE).
