= Presidency of the Council of Ministers (Italy) =

- Presidenza del Consiglio dei ministri

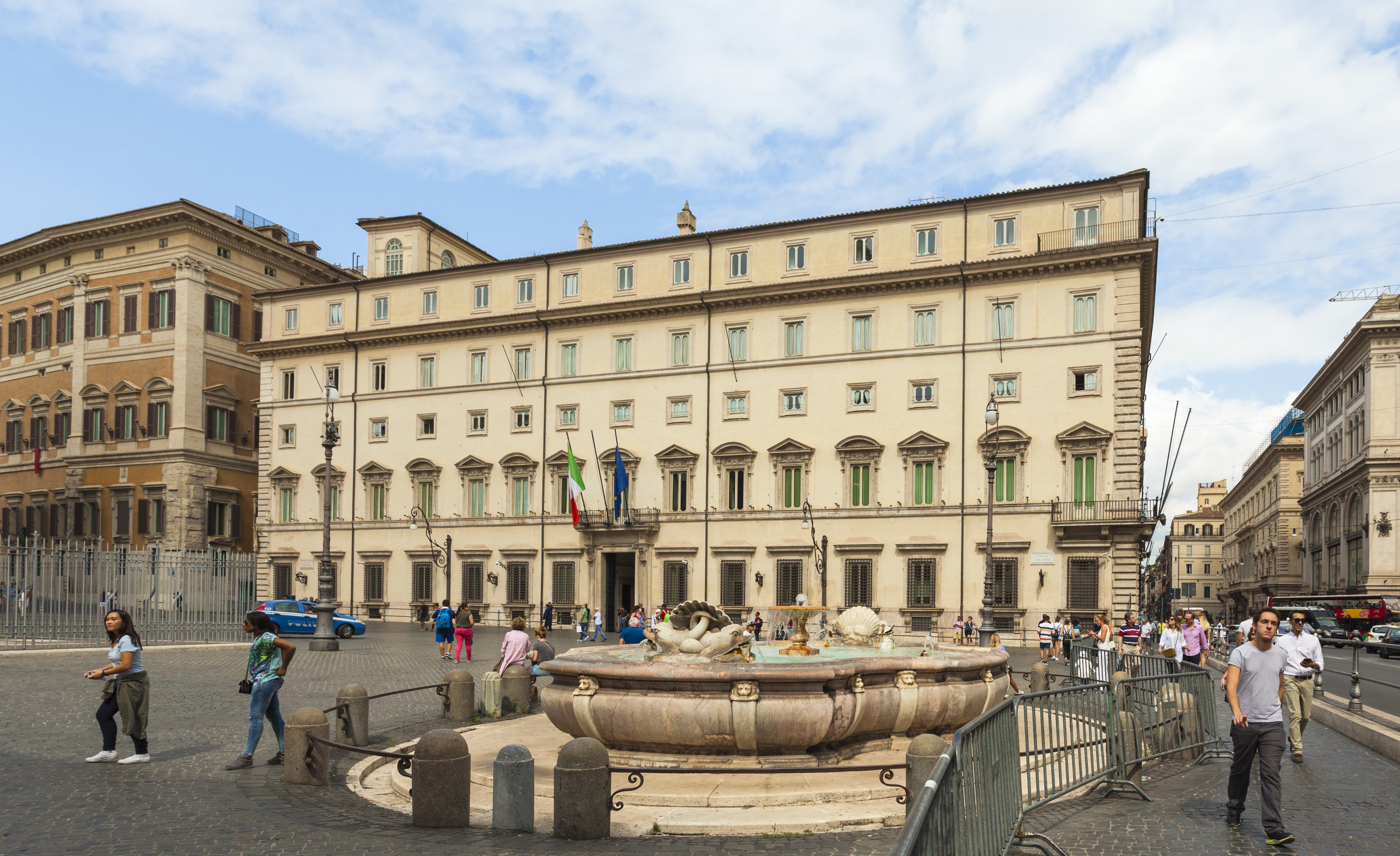
- Chigi Palace, the seat of the Cabinet

Agency overview
- Formed: 1848
- Jurisdiction: Government of Italy
- Headquarters: Chigi Palace, Rome
- Agency executive: Alfredo Mantovano, Secretary of the Council
- Website: governo.it

The Presidency of the Council of Ministers (Italian: Presidenza del Consiglio dei ministri) is the administrative structure which supports the Prime Minister of Italy (referred to in Italian as the President of the Council of Ministers). It is thus the Italian equivalent of the Prime Minister's Office. It contains those departments which carry out duties invested in the office of the Prime Minister. Duties invested in the Italian executive government generally are not administered by the Presidency, but by the individual ministries.

== History ==
The creation of the Presidency of the Council of Ministers is comparatively recent and is closely connected with the acquisition of significant autonomy by the Prime Minister. For a long time, the Prime Minister was not very prominent in his own right, separate from the government and the individual ministries which he controlled. Thus, until 1960, the headquarters of the Presidency of the Council was in the Palazzo del Viminale - the same location as the Ministry of the Interior.

Throughout the period of the Kingdom of Italy, the Prime Minister used the Viminale to execute his will, and often held the position of Minister of the Interior concurrently. This relationship was so close that the Prime Minister's letterhead was the same as that of the Ministry of the Interior. During the fascist period, Mussolini used the Palazzo Venezia as his personal headquarters, but did not base his government there.

However, it was during Mussolini's government that the first regulations of government activity took place, with the passage of Royal Decree law no.1100 of 10 July 1924, relating to the cabinet of the Presidency of the Council of Ministers. With the institution of the Italian Republic, it returned to the Viminale. In 1961, Palazzo Chigi came to be used as a headquarters for the government and the Ministry of Foreign Affairs, which had been based there up to this point was transferred to its current headquarters in the Palazzo della Farnesina. After this, the Presidency of the Council began to take shape, although not in an organic manner, since it lacked a law which regulated its entire operation. In 1988, the government of Ciriaco De Mita approved law no. 400, which regulated the Presidency. In 1999, under the government of Massimo D'Alema the re-organisation of the presidency was carried out with Decree law no.303 of 30 July 1999, part of the Bassanini reforms.

== Structure ==
The structure of the Presidency of the Council, according to the DPCM of 1 March 2011 and the DPCM of 21 June 2012, is organised into offices which work with the Prime Minister directly; general departments and offices which the Prime Minister employs for directing and co-ordinating specific political and institutional areas; general offices which support the Prime Minister in general co-ordination and general political direction; and technical support.

=== Offices which collaborate with the Prime Minister directly ===
The Offices of the Prime Minister's staff are:

- Office of the Prime Minister, consisting of the private secretariat
- Office of Communications of the Prime Minister
- Office of the Diplomatic Advisor
- Office of the Military Advisor. This office contains the Service for Co-ordinating the Production of Arms (UCPMA).

=== Offices for directing and co-ordinating political and institutional areas ===
These are offices and departments of the Presidency, through which the Prime Minister addresses and co-ordinates specific political and institutional areas. They are under the control of the Secretary General of the Presidency, but are usually entrusted to an Undersecretary of State or a Minister without portfolio.

- Department for Regional Affairs, Autonomy, and Sport.
- Department of Public Function.
- Department of Youth and National Civil Service, under Minister of Labour and Social Policy.
- Department for Equal Opportunities.
- Department for Anti-Drug Policy.
- Department for European Policy.
- Department for Family Policy.
- Department for Planning and Co-ordinating Economic Policy.
- Department of Civil Protection.
- Department for Interaction with Parliament.
- Department for Institutional Reforms.
- Department for the Digital Transformations
- Office for the Government Programme,
- Office of the Secretariat of the Permanent Conference for the Relationship between the State, the Regions, and the Autonomous Provinces
- Office of the Secretariat of the State-City and Autonomous Localities Conference

=== Offices for general co-ordination and direction ===
These are offices and departments which support the Prime Minister in general political co-ordination and direction, as well as providing technical support. Normally, these are under the control of the Secretary General of the Presidency, but they can be assigned to the Undersecretaries of State.

- Department for Judicial and Legislative Affairs
- Department for Administrative Co-ordination
- Department for Information and Publishing
- Office for Internal Control, Transparency and Integrity
- Office of the Secretary General
- Office of the Secretariat of the Council of Ministers
- Department of Creation, Promotion, and Development of Human and Instrumental Resources
- Office of the Budget and for the Confirmation of Administrative-Accounting Regularity
- Office for State Ceremony and Honours

=== National security ===
The Presidency controls the Department of Information for Security, which has a special role in the supervision of the Italian intelligence services (i.e. the secret service), which report directly to the Prime Minister, who can delegate functions which are not exclusively vested in the Prime Minister to ministers without portfolio or Undersecretaries of state.

=== Other offices ===
The Presidency of the Council deals with the personnel of the Administrative Courts (TAR and the Council of State), the Audit Courts (Court of Audit and its regional sections), the Tax Courts (Provincial and regional tax commissions), and the Government legal service (State Attorney and district attorneys). The Presidency is responsible for the administrative management of personnel, including hiring processes. However, these various courts retain their powers of self-regulation.

=== Committees and commissions ===
There are some commissions and committees based at the Presidency. They are:

- National Committee for Bioethics
- National Committee for Biosecurity, Biotechnology, and Life Sciences
- Technical-Scientific Committee for Strategic Control in the Administration of the State
- Commissions on Religious Freedom and Relationships between Religions
- Committee for Access to Administrative Documents
- Commission for International Adoptions
- Commission for Equal Opportunities for Men and Women
- Inter-ministerial Committee for Economic Planning (CIPE)

=== Extraordinary Commissariats ===
Extraordinary commissariats can be established for the achievement of specific objectives and temporary issues. They are:

- Extraordinary commisariat for coordinating activities connected to the creation of the Turin–Lyon high-speed railway;
- Government extraordinary commisariat for the co-ordination of anti-racketeering and anti-usury initiatives;
- Government extraordinary commisariat for prison infrastructure;
- Government extraordinary commisariat for the negotiation of the issue of the two fusiliers, Latorre and Girone.

=== Supervised entities ===
Finally, there are a series of entities under the supervision of the presidency. They are:

- The National School of Administration (SSPA) is a public institution established in 1957 to train functionaries and officials of the state and other entities, to carry out research and consultations, and to participate in various international organisations related to training public officials. It has organisational autonomy and freedom to dispose of the economic resources assigned to it as it chooses, under Decree Law 381 of 29 December 2003.
- The Agency for the Digital Italy (AGID), which works within the Presidency of the Council to accomplish policy formulated by the Department of reforms and innovation in public administration, in order to give technological support for the ITC projects of the civil service.
- The National Agency for the Safety of Flight (ANSV), which works under the supervision of the Presidency of the Council and takes care of technical investigations into aeronautical incidents (Not to be confused with the Italian Civil Aviation Authority which is supervised by the Ministry of Infrastructure and Transport and is in charge of the administration of Italian civil aviation, whose powers are increasingly assumed by the European Aviation Safety Agency.
