= Vito Miceli =

Italian general and politician

Vito Miceli (6 January 1916 – 1 December 1990) was an Italian general and politician.

== Biography ==
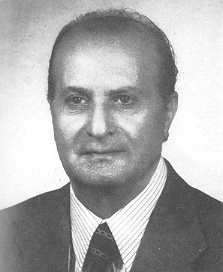
Vito Miceli in 1976

Born in Trapani, he was a lieutenant of the Bersaglieri during the Second World War.

He was chief of the SIOS, the Italian Army Intelligence's Service from 1969 and, was promoted to division general, the military intelligence service SID's head from 18 October 1970 to 1974.

Vito Miceli was arrested in October 1974 on charges of political conspiracy concerning investigations about the Golpe Borghese coup attempt. He was acquitted of any wrongdoing in 1978. Miceli received money in 1972 from the United States embassy in Rome. Ambassador Graham Martin turned $800,000 over to Miceli, as Italy's intelligence chief, with the approval of the director of the National Security Council, Henry Kissinger, despite the objections of the CIA Rome station chief. It is unknown how Miceli spent the money. Miceli was a member of the masonic Propaganda Due.

He later became a deputy of the Italian Parliament for the neo-fascist Italian Social Movement (1976–1987).
