= SIOS =

Servizio Informazioni Operative e Situazione (Operative Informations and Situation Service) was an Italian military intelligence and security service serving from 1949 until 1997. Its main duty was safeguarding the internal security of military bases and its personnel and military intelligence activities against enemy and foreign forces, especially through SIGINT activities.

It was composed of three divisions: the SIOS Marina ("SIOS Navy"), the SIOS Aeronautica ("SIOS Air Force") and the SIOS Esercito ("SIOS Army"). Some SIOS personnel came from the ranks of the Arma dei Carabinieri (Force of Carabinieri) for the power of Military Police that the Carabinieri has. The SIOS personnel operated under the authority of the chief of staff of their respective armed forces, and they also shared coordination goals with SIFAR (then become SID and after SISMI).

Since 1998, the II Reparto informazioni e sicurezza - II RIS ("Security and Intelligence Section", not to be confused with the RIS, Reparto Investigazioni Scientifiche, "Scientific Investigation Section", the forensic science unit of the Carabinieri) and its intelligence branch: CII, Centro Intelligence Interforze ("Joint Intelligence Center"), serves at the joint level the same purposes previously attended by the SIOS.
