= Stare Kiejkuty =

Stare Kiejkuty can refer to:

- Stare Kiejkuty, Warmian-Masurian Voivodeship, a village in northern Poland
- Stare Kiejkuty (base), a Polish military intelligence training base
