= Rendition aircraft =

Aircraft used to conduct rendition flights

This page describes several aircraft that are alleged in media reports to have been used in the practice of extraordinary rendition, the extralegal transfer of prisoners from one country to another.

== N313P ==
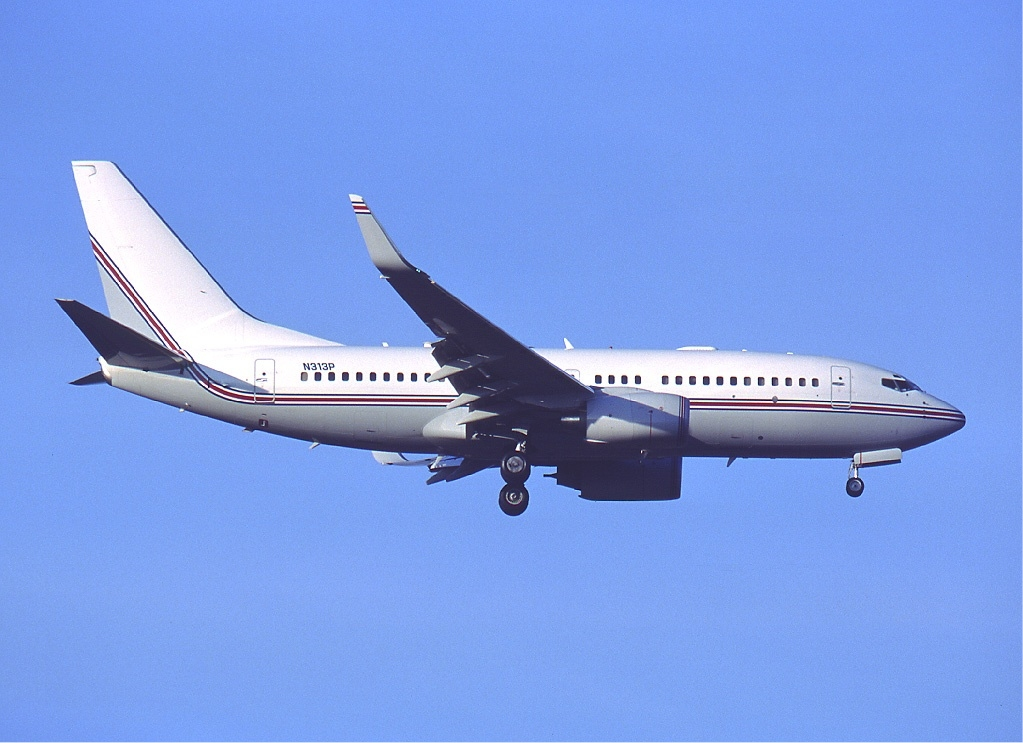
Boeing 737-700 of PETS in Frankfurt, Germany on 11 January 2003

N313P was a tailnumber assigned to a Boeing 737 that the Chicago Tribune reported on Tuesday, February 6, 2007, flew from Tashkent to Kabul, Afghanistan, on September 21, 2003, and then to Szczytno-Szymany International Airport in Poland, landing at 9 p.m. "It stayed on the ground for 57 minutes before taking off for Baneasa Airport in Bucharest, Romania, an airport that, according to the Marty Report, 'bears all the characteristics of a detainee transfer or drop-off point,'" states author Tom Hundley on page 14 of the Tribune. The 737 then continued on to Rabat, Morocco, and Guantanamo Bay, the Marty Report said. In 2004 the plane was used to render LIFG leader Abdel Hakim Belhaj and his wife Fatima Bouchar to Libya.

"The registered owners of both planes [Boeing 737, N313P, and Gulfstream V, N379P] appear to be CIA front companies. Previous attempts by the Tribune to contact the owners produced a trail of non-existent people at unlikely addresses, or law firms that did not want to discuss the nature of their interest in aviation. Both planes have been involved in rendition cases documented by the Tribune, other media and EU investigators," states the Chicago Tribune on page 14.

== N379P ==
N379P was a tailnumber assigned to a Gulfstream V executive jet. The aircraft has been reported in several press sources as a U.S. Department of Defense prisoner transport, also known as "Guantánamo Bay Express". The craft has been reported to being used to transport suspected terrorists to undisclosed locations for either extraordinary rendition or into the CIA prison system. It has been the subject of criminal complaints and parliamentary inquiries.

According to an in-depth investigation into the worldwide network of detention and interrogation facilities employed in the war on terror, by the British Guardian newspaper, (March 2005):

We were able to chart the to-ing and fro-ing of the private executive jet used at [an abduction in Sweden] partly through the observations of plane-spotters posted on the web and partly through a senior source in the Pakistan Inter Services Intelligence agency (ISI). It was a Gulfstream V Turbo, tailfin number N379P; its flight plans always began at an airstrip in Smithfield, North Carolina, and ended in some of the world's hot spots. It was owned by Premier Executive Transport Services, incorporated in Delaware, a brass plaque company with nonexistent directors, hired by American agents to revive an old CIA tactic from the 1970s, when agency men had kidnapped South American criminals and flown them back to their own countries to face trial so that justice could be rendered. Now "rendering" was being used by the Bush administration to evade justice. Robert Baer, a CIA case officer in the Middle East until 1997, told us how it works. "We pick up a suspect or we arrange for one of our partner countries to do it. Then the suspect is placed on civilian transport to a third country where, let's make no bones about it, they use torture. If you want a good interrogation, you send someone to Jordan. If you want them to be killed, you send them to Egypt or Syria. Either way, the U.S. cannot be blamed as it is not doing the heavy work."

=== Background ===
The first media mention of N379P was six weeks after September 11, 2001, when, according to the Chicago Tribune, a Pakistani newspaper reported that a student at the University of Karachi and a citizen of Yemen, had been seen being forced onto the plane at Jinnah International Airport by Pakistani security officers on the morning of October 23, 2001. The Chicago Tribune reported on the aircraft again on February 6, 2007, stating that N379P departed Washington Dulles International Airport July 27, 2003, and flew to Frankfurt, Germany according to FAA records. The FAA then records the Gulfstream taking off from Tashkent, Uzbekistan, on July 31, 2003, bound for Glasgow, Scotland, and then return to Dulles. The Tribune then states that Polish aviation records indicate that N379P landed at Szczytno-Szymany International Airport, a remote airfield at Szymany, Poland, at 2:58 a.m. on July 30, 2003, after a flight from Afghanistan. How the aircraft moved from Frankfurt to Tashkent remains unreported. The Szymany airport is located southwest of the Stare Kiejkuty intelligence base in northern Poland.

The executive jet with the tail number N379P was again brought to public attention by Swedish TV4's documentary, Det brutna löftet ("The broken promise"), aired May 17, 2004. The documentary claimed that the expulsion of two men, Ahmed Agiza and Muhammad al-Zery—ordered by the Cabinet—to Egypt on December 18, 2001, was carried out by hooded U.S. agents. The plane booked by the Swedish Security Police (SÄPO) was cancelled when another plane arrived—N379P—a Gulfstream V executive jet supplied by the firm (Premier Executive Transport Services, Inc.) which works exclusively for the U.S. Defense Department.

Agiza and al-Zery were arrested and brought to Bromma airport in Stockholm where Swedish police handed them over to hooded operatives. The two prisoners had their clothes cut from their bodies by scissors, without their hand- and footcuffs being loosened. The naked and chained prisoners were given suppository of unknown kind inserted into their anus, and diapers were put on them. They were forcibly dressed in dark overalls. Their hands and feet are chained to a specially designed harness. On the plane, both men are blindfolded and hooded. The plane took off at 21.49 and set course towards Egypt.

Later on, when the Gulfstream's log books came into a journalist's hands, the wider scope became clear:

Analysis of the plane's flight plans, covering more than two years, shows that it always departs from Washington, D.C. It has flown to 49 destinations outside America, including the Guantanamo Bay prison camp in Cuba and other U.S. military bases, as well as Egypt, Jordan, Iraq, Morocco, Afghanistan, Libya and Uzbekistan. Witnesses have claimed that the suspects are frequently bound, gagged and sedated before being put on board the planes, which do not have special facilities for prisoners but are kitted out with tables for meetings and screens for presentations and in-flight films.

=== Appearance in fiction ===
N379P appears in the episode "Hundrede dage" of the Danish TV series Borgen which focuses on the problems for the Danish prime-minister caused by the revelation of rendition flights landing at Thule. In addition, a Gulfstream V that is being used to carry out an extraordinary rendition appears in Jason Trask's 2011 novel I'm Not Muhammad (Red Wheelbarrow Books).

== N596GA ==
N596GA was the tailnumber of a Gulfstream V, which has also been mentioned in print as a possible transport for the CIA program of extraordinary rendition. According to a 2008 article by writer Dave Willis, the plane was ordered in 1999 by the United States Air Force as a C-37A, serial 99-0405, and was rolled out as N596GA but only briefly took up its military serial before reverting to the civil registration, issued on September 20, 2001, nine days after the 9-11 attacks. It was registered to National Aircraft Leasing of Greenville, New Castle County in Delaware, "and is believed to have been used by the Justice Prisoner Air Transportation Systems (JPATS), managed by the U.S. Marshals Service. JPATS is responsible for moving prisoners and non-US citizen criminals around and has its own fleet of aircraft, as well as frequently leasing others. N596GA is also said to have been used in the CIA's programme of extraordinary rendition against terrorist subjects."

== N85VM ==
N85VM was the tail number of a Gulfstream IV which newspaper reports have speculated may have been used as a US Department of Defense or CIA prisoner transport. Plane logs obtained by reporters show that the plane was in Cairo on February 18, 2003, the same day that the radical Egyptian cleric Abu Omar arrived in Cairo after being abducted in Italy, leading reporters to speculate that the Gulfstream IV may have been the plane used to render Abu Omar. American and Italian intelligence officers were later charged with Abu Omar's abduction.

In addition to the trip to Cairo, between June 2002 and January 2005, the aircraft made 51 trips to Guantánamo Bay, as well as 82 visits to Dulles International Airport and Andrews Air Force Base. It also visited U.S. air bases at Ramstein and Rhein-Main in Germany, Afghanistan, Morocco, Dubai, Jordan, Italy, Japan, Switzerland, Azerbaijan and the Czech Republic.

== See also ==
- Aero Contractors (US)
- Air America (airline)
- Southern Air Transport
- Tepper Aviation
