= Larisa Alexandrovna Horton =

American journalist, essayist, and poet

- Born: 1971 (age 54–55); Odessa, Ukrainian SSR, Soviet Union
- Education: Cleveland State University
- Occupations: Journalist; essayist; poet
- Spouse: Scott Horton

Larisa Alexandrovna Horton (born 1971) is an American journalist, essayist, and poet. She has served as the managing editor of investigative news of The Raw Story and contributes opinion and columns to online publications such as AlterNet. She is also an American blogger for the Huffington Post and for her own journalism blog, at-Largely. Horton has had her work referenced in publications like Rolling Stone, Vanity Fair, and Newsweek. She is married to Scott Horton.

== Early life ==
Horton was born in Odessa, Ukrainian SSR to Jewish parents Aleksander Yurovich, a physicist, and Klavdia Borisovna, an accountant. In the Soviet Union, Jews were discriminated against by the state. She has written of her childhood that even as a child, she was able to understand that her family was treated differently:

What I was given was not what one would call edible or even in a class of food-like products. Again I did not tell my parents, because again I feared something terrible would happen should they react. I was six and I knew this. But my continued weight loss had my mother so concerned that she began selling off the little she had in jewelry in order to bribe my school officials to feed me, with food, the same food, served the same way, as the other children. Most Americans, especially white Americans, would never understand this and have no clue what racism, antisemitism, and hate are and what damage real hate can do. They faint in public when someone makes a slur but say nothing about US prisons populated with minorities.

The family came to the United States after traveling an "entire year maneuvering our way throughout Europe in the common trajectory of Soviet refugees at the time."

Horton attended Cleveland State University where she majored in English and Creative Writing. It was during this time that she was the poetry editor for the Cleveland Review, also covering local news and culture. In addition, she worked with Russian poet Zoya Folkova to translate her work into English. She also developed a lifelong friendship with her writing mentor, Dr. Alberta Turner. In the mid-1990s, she moved to New York to work at Nasdaq, which she has said was a bad decision.

== Writing career ==
Horton initially published only poetry and short fiction. During the 2000 election, she said that she formally began to write opinion and news pieces. She first became recognized for her reporting after she wrote an investigative piece about election fraud in Ohio in 2004, which was later cited in What Went Wrong in Ohio, a report published by US Representative John Conyers (D-MI) and later cited in several prominent articles, including in Robert F. Kennedy Jr.'s controversial Rolling Stone article.

Later articles on election fraud and domestic politics, included covering the Real ID Act, did not gain much attention domestically. However, a series of articles on the prewar intelligence on Iraq and alleged illegal activities of the US Department of Defense and reporting on the CIA leak case and Iran gained Horton respect as an investigative journalist.

=== Plamegate ===
On March 16, 2007, Valerie Plame Wilson told the House Committee on Oversight and Government Reform, "But I do know the Agency did a damage assessment. They did not share it with me, but I know that certainly puts the people and the contacts I had all in jeopardy, even if they were completely innocent in nature." Horton broke the story wide open that Plame was working on Iran, damage was done by her outing, and a damage report had been done. Citing "three intelligence officials, who spoke under condition of anonymity," Horton reported:

While Director of Central Intelligence Porter Goss has not submitted a formal damage assessment to Congressional oversight committees, the CIA's Directorate of Operations did conduct a serious and aggressive investigation.

According to her sources:

the damage assessment... called a "counter intelligence assessment to agency operations" was conducted on the orders of the CIA's then-Deputy Director of the Directorate of Operations, James Pavitt.... [and showed] "significant damage to operational equities."

Horton also reported that while Plame was undercover, she was involved in an operation identifying and tracking weapons of mass destruction technology to and from Iran. Horton suggested that her outing "significantly hampered the CIA's ability to monitor nuclear proliferation." Her sources also stated that the outing of Plame compromised the identity of other covert operatives who had been working, like Plame, under non-official cover status. The anonymous officials said that in their judgement, the CIA's work on WMDs has been set back "ten years" as a result of that compromise.

Mainstream media initially ignored the story, but on May 1, 2006, the MSNBC correspondent David Shuster reported on the political news show Hardball that MSNBC had learned "new information" about the potential consequences of the leaks:

Intelligence sources say Valerie Wilson was part of an operation three years ago tracking the proliferation of nuclear weapons material into Iran. And the sources allege that when Mrs Wilson's cover was blown, the Administration's ability to track Iran's nuclear ambitions was damaged as well. The White House considers Iran to be one of America's biggest threats.

On September 6, 2006, David Corn published an article for The Nation, "What Valerie Plame Really Did at the CIA," in which Corn reported that Plame has been placed in charge of the operations group within the Joint Task Force on Iraq in the spring of 2001 and that "when the Novak column ran" in July 2003:

Valerie Wilson was in the process of changing her clandestine status from NOC to official cover, as she prepared for a new job in personnel management. Her aim, she told colleagues, was to put in time as an administrator — to rise up a notch or two — and then return to secret operations. But with her cover blown, she could never be undercover again.

CBS News would later confirm Plame "was involved in operations to prevent Iran from building nuclear weapons."

=== Polish black site ===
In 2005, the Washington Post exposed the use of foreign black sites by the CIA in a program of extraordinary rendition, under which terrorism suspects were taken to undisclosed sites for detainment and interrogation.

Critics of the Washington Post report believe that the publication caved under pressure from the White House by not exposing the locations of the sites. According to Fairness and Accuracy In Reporting, the Washington Post's decision to withhold the locations of the secret prisons was that since the revelations "could open the US government to legal challenges, particularly in foreign courts, and increase the risk of political condemnation at home and abroad," the Post did its part to minimize these risks. However, according to FAIR, "the possibility that illegal, unpopular government actions might be disrupted is not a consequence to be feared, however — it's the whole point of the U.S. First Amendment." Furthermore, not disclosing the locations would make it impossible to have them closed, and thereby the Post was enabling the rendition, secret detention, and torture of prisoners at the locations to continue. Another consequence might be for US soldiers and civilians to be put at risk.

Sources that had approached the Post with the location of the Polish facility turned to Polish intelligence operative David Dastych, who, in turn, approached Horton. According to The Raw Story, in a report authored by Horton and Dastych, the Polish black site is in Stare Kiejkuty:

The complex at Stare Kiejkuty, a Soviet-era compound once used by German intelligence in World War II, is best known as having been the only Russian intelligence training school to operate outside the Soviet Union. Its prominence in the Soviet era suggests that it may have been the facility first identified — but never named — when the Washington Post's Dana Priest revealed the existence of the CIA's secret prison network in November 2005.

Both Horton and Dastych have stated that their sources told them that the same information and documents were provided to Washington Post in 2005. In addition, they also identified the methodology of concealing the black sites:

Former European and US intelligence officials indicate that the secret prisons across the European Union, first identified by the Washington Post, are likely not permanent locations, making them difficult to identify. What some believe was a network of secret prisons was most probably a series of facilities used temporarily by the United States when needed, officials say. Interim "black sites," secret facilities used for covert activities, can be as small as a room in a government building, which becomes a black site only when a prisoner is brought in for short-term detainment and interrogation.

They go on to explain, "Such a site, sources say, would have to be near an airport." According to Horton and Dastych, the airport in question is the Szczytno-Szymany International Airport.

In response to the allegations, the former Polish intelligence chief Zbigniew Siemiatkowski embarked on a media blitz and claimed that the allegations made by Horton and Dastych were "part of the domestic political battle in the US over who is to succeed current Republican President George W. Bush," according to the German news agency Deutsche Presse-Agentur.

== See also ==
- Mojahedin-e-Khalq Organization
- Michael Ledeen
- Operation Orchard

== Notes ==
Conyers Letter to FBI, US House Judiciary

Was the 2004 Election Stolen?, Rolling Stone

Questions surface regarding legitimacy of Baker-Carter election reform commission, Raw Story

Larisa Alexandrovna. "Outed CIA Officer Was Working on Iran, Intelligence Sources Say", The Raw Story, February 13, 2006.
