= Aero Contractors =

Aero Contractors is the name of two unrelated air transport companies:

- Aero Contractors (Nigeria), an airline based in Lagos, Nigeria
- Aero Contractors (United States), a former CIA front airline based in Smithfield, North Carolina
