= Premier Executive Transport Services =

CIA shell company & airplane owner

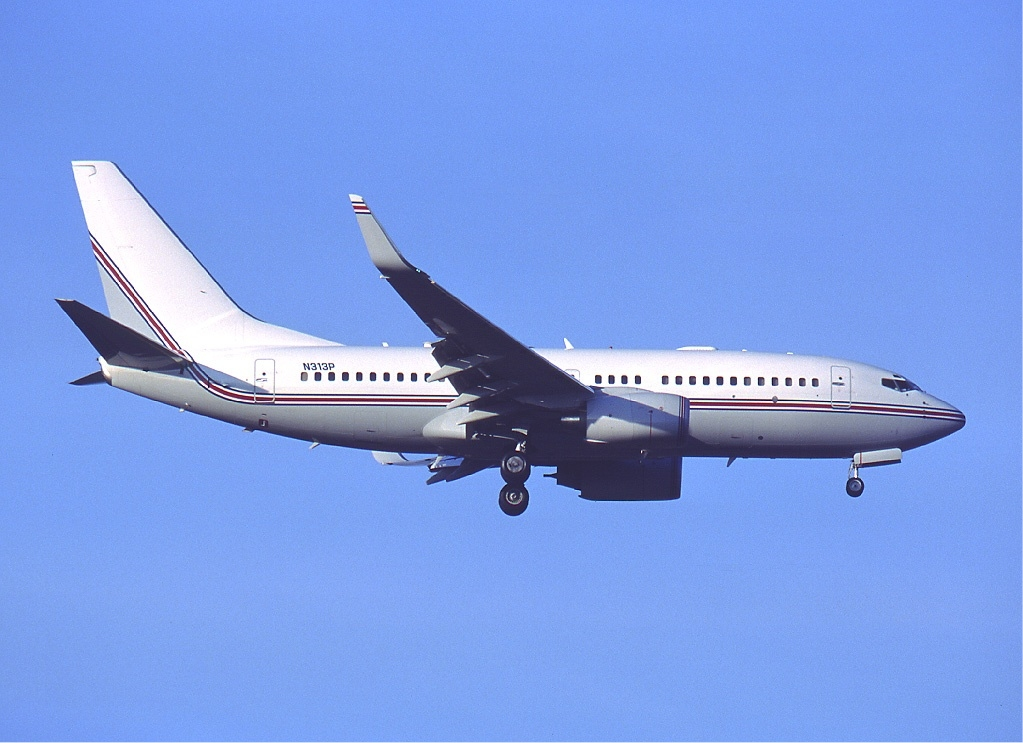
- Boeing 737-700 of PETS in Frankfurt, Germany, on 11 January 2003
IATA	ICAO	Call sign
-	-	-
- Fleet size: 1 Gulfstream V 1 Boeing 737

Premier Executive Transport Services was an airline listed as Foreign Corporation in the Commonwealth of Massachusetts. It is alleged to be a front company for the Central Intelligence Agency (CIA). According to investigative journalists the company does not have any offices or premises, and searches of public records for identifying information about the company's officers have yielded only post office boxes in Virginia, Maryland and Washington, D.C., and also known as P LLC in Wyoming.

Premier Executive Transport Services has apparently owned two planes, both with permits to land at U.S. military bases: a Gulfstream V with the tail number N44982 (formerly N379P and N8068V), and a Boeing 737 with the tail number N313P (now N720MM and owned by MGM Mirage.) These planes are reported to have been involved in the CIA's extraordinary rendition program, in which suspected terrorists are transported to black sites to be interrogated and, allegedly, tortured.

== See also ==
- Black site
- Aero Contractors
- Rendition aircraft
- List of defunct airlines of the United States
