= Johnston Regional Airport =

Public airport in Smithfield, North Carolina

- IATA: JNX; ICAO: KJNX

Summary
- Airport type: Public
- Owner/Operator: Johnston County Airport Authority
- Serves: Johnston County, North Carolina, U.S.
- Location: Smithfield, Johnston County, North Carolina, U.S.
- Opened: June 1978
- Time zone: EST (UTC−05:00)
  - Summer (DST): EDT (UTC−04:00)
- Elevation AMSL: 164 ft / 50 m
- Coordinates: 35°32′27″N 78°23′25″W
- Website: https://www.johnstonnc.gov/jnx/index.cfm

Map
- Location of airport in North Carolina JNX (the United States)

Runways
Direction	Length		Surface
Direction	ft	m	Surface
03/21	5,500	1,676	Asphalt

Statistics (2025)
- Enplaned: 3
- Based Aircraft: 126
- Source: NPIAS

Johnston Regional Airport (IATA: JNX, ICAO: KJNX, FAA LID: JNX) is a public, county-owned airport located in Smithfield, North Carolina. The airport is located 3 miles (4.8 km) northwest of downtown Smithfield. This airport is included in the National Plan of Integrated Airport Systems for 2025–2029, which categorized it as a regional general aviation facility.

== History ==
The airport's activation date was in June 1978. Aero Contractors was a private charter company which was based at the airport provided discreet air transport services for the Central Intelligence Agency (CIA). Duke Life Flight is based at the airport. In 2023, the airport was recognized as the busiest airport for general aviation operations in North Carolina. It also is the fourth busiest airport overall, after Charlotte, Raleigh, and Greensboro.

== Services ==
The airport does not have any scheduled operations.

== Future developments ==
In 2024, the Federal Aviation Administration stated the airport has to build a control tower within the next five years.

== See also ==
- List of airports in North Carolina
