= Scott Horton (radio host) =

American radio host and author

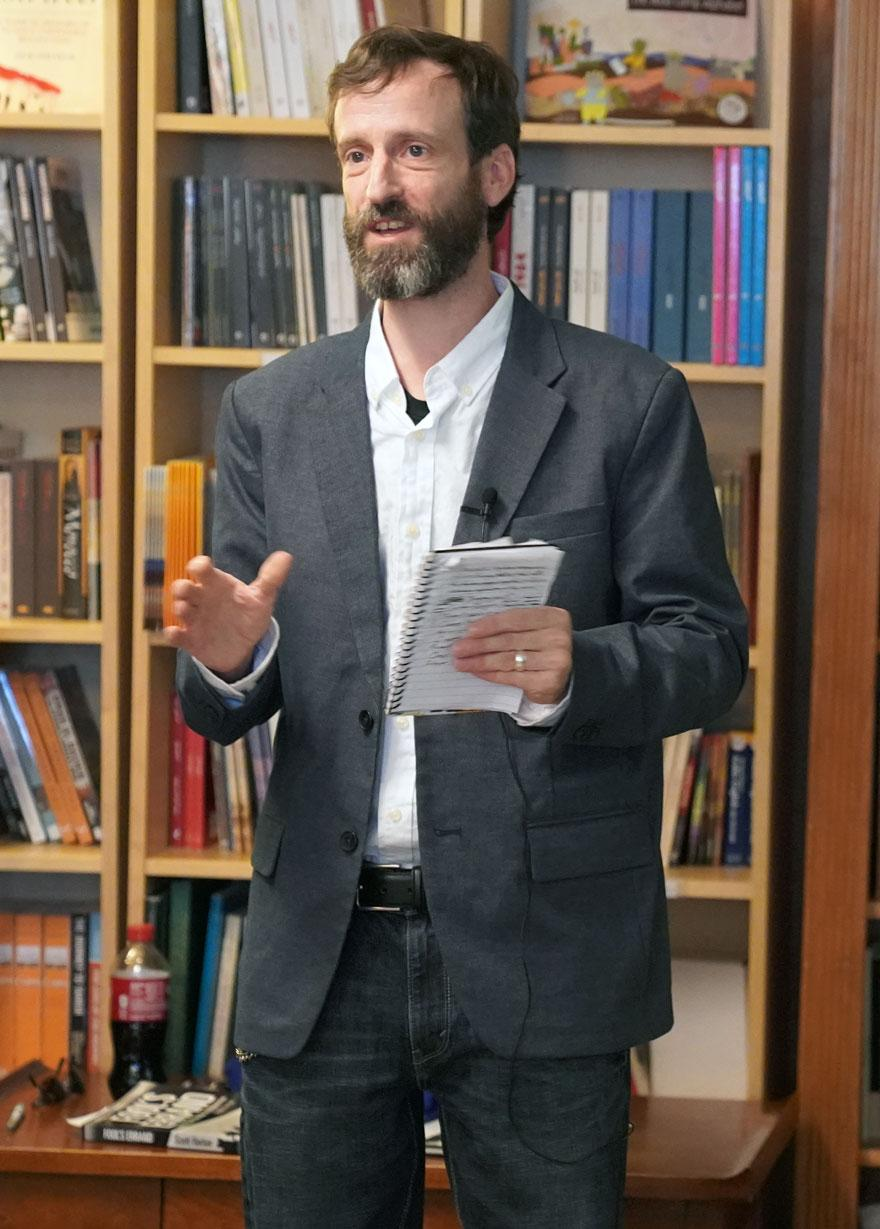
- Horton in 2019
- Occupations: Author, podcaster, radio host
- Organization(s): Antiwar.com, The Libertarian Institute
- Spouse: Larisa Alexandrovna Horton
- Website: ScottHorton.org

Scott Horton is an American radio host and author. He serves as the director of the Libertarian Institute and hosts The Scott Horton Show, where he has conducted interviews with experts on foreign policy, war, and civil liberties. Horton is also the author of Fool's Errand: Time to End the War in Afghanistan, Enough Already: Time to End the War on Terrorism, and Provoked: How Washington Started the New Cold War with Russia and the Catastrophe in Ukraine, all of which critique U.S. military interventions.

An advocate of non-interventionism, Horton is known for his libertarian critique of American foreign policy and his opposition to the expansion of military power.

== Career ==
He previously hosted several shows, including Antiwar Radio for Pacifica Radio's KPFK 90.7 FM in Los Angeles, Say It Ain't So on Free Radio Austin 97.1 FM, the Weekend Interview Show and the KAOS Report on Radio KAOS 95.9 FM, for which he won The Austin Chronicle's Best of Austin award in 2007 for "Best Iraq War Coverage."

Horton's book Fool's Errand: Time to End the War in Afghanistan (2017) is an account of the War in Afghanistan since 2001, which argues that the United States should end its presence in the country. The American Conservative described the work as a "masterful account of America's prolonged Afghan engagement."

In 2019, Horton edited and published a collection of interviews with former U.S. Representative Ron Paul entitled The Great Ron Paul: The Scott Horton Show Interviews 2004–2019.

In 2021, the Libertarian Institute published his book Enough Already: Time to End the War on Terrorism, an appeal to end the American global military campaign known as the war on terror.

In a May 2023 article, Horton argued that the United States should end its involvement in the Russo-Ukrainian War, claiming that U.S. actions, including NATO expansion, missile deployments, and what he calls 'orchestrated' regime changes in Ukraine (referring to the 2014 Maidan Revolution), provoked the Russian invasion of Ukraine. He criticized past U.S. administrations for undermining peace efforts such as the Minsk agreements through arms sales to Ukraine and rhetoric aimed at weakening Russia. Highlighting the risk of nuclear escalation due to the war’s proximity to Moscow, Horton likened U.S. actions to hypothetical Chinese and Russian provocations near the U.S. border, in Canada and Mexico. He closed his article by calling for an immediate U.S. withdrawal from any involvement in the conflict.

In 2024 he published Provoked: How Washington started the New Cold War with Russia and the Catastrophe in Ukraine. Horton argues that politics after 1991 is "not just a story of Russian revanchism, but the apotheosis of decades of American policy to diminish and isolate the former Soviet Union for the benefit of its own empire. Horton relies among a vast number of sources and analyses on Marc Trachtenberg's archival research work, especially Trachtenberg’s arguments that NATO expansion was a premeditated provocation, not an improvised response to post-Cold War chaos. Furthermore, the U.S. deliberately exploited Russian weakness after the USSR’s collapse, reneging on assurances to Gorbachev. (Provoked, p. 59ff). One of Hortons conclusions is:

The key to understanding the situation is that H.W. Bush and his cabinet were lying to the Soviets, later the Russians, before President Bill Clinton ever came to Washington. His administration would then continue to do so into the new millennium. (Provoked, p. 76)

== Works ==
- Lords of Secrecy: The National Security Elite and America's Stealth Warfare (2015)
- Fool's Errand: Time to End the War in Afghanistan (2017)
- The Great Ron Paul: The Scott Horton Show Interviews 2004–2019 (2019)
- Enough Already: Time to End the War on Terrorism (2021)
- Hotter Than the Sun: Time to Abolish Nuclear Weapons (2022)
- Provoked: How Washington Started the New Cold War with Russia and the Catastrophe in Ukraine (2024)

== See also ==
- Libertarianism in the United States
- List of peace activists
