= Stare Kiejkuty, Warmian-Masurian Voivodeship =

Stare Kiejkuty
- Village
- Location within Poland
- Coordinates: 53°38′N 21°4′E
- Country: Poland
- Voivodeship: Warmian-Masurian
- County: Szczytno
- Gmina: Szczytno

Stare Kiejkuty [ˈstarɛ kʲɛi̯ˈkutɨ] (German: Alt Keykuth) is a village in the administrative district of Gmina Szczytno, within Szczytno County, Warmian-Masurian Voivodeship, in northern Poland.

The territory of the village includes the Ośrodek Szkolenia Agencji Wywiadu (Intelligence Agency Training Center), a restricted military area. Since 2005 it has attracted scrutiny as being a black site involved in the CIA's program of extraordinary rendition.
