= Dick Marty =

Swiss politician (1945–2023)

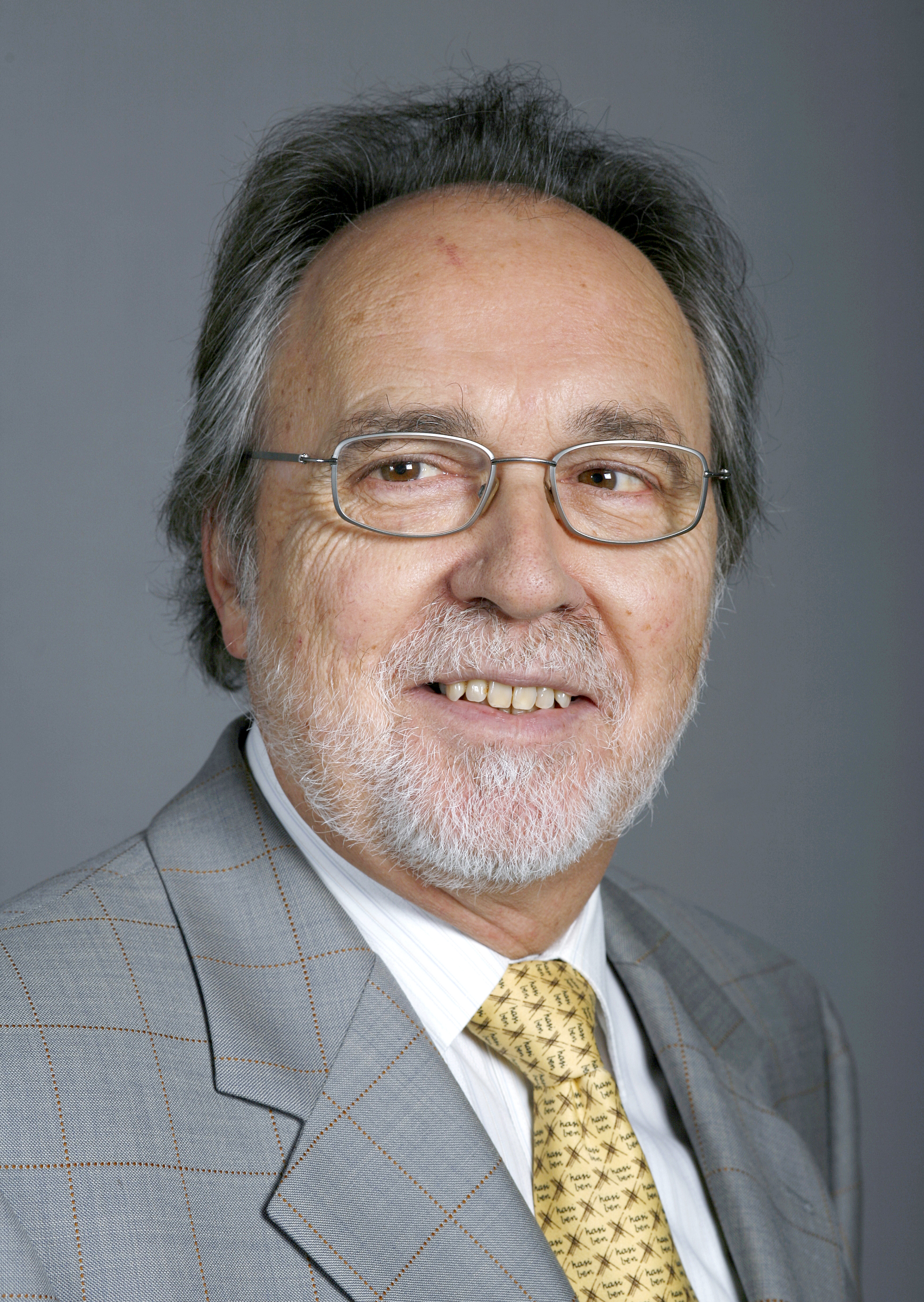
- Marty in 2007

Member of the Swiss Council of States
- In office 1995–2011
- Constituency: Ticino

Member of the Parliamentary Assembly of the Council of Europe
- In office 1998–2012

Personal details
- Born: 7 January 1945 Sorengo, Switzerland
- Died: 28 December 2023 (aged 78)
- Party: FDP.The Liberals
- Education: University of Neuchâtel
- Profession: Politician, State Prosecutor, Legal and Economic Consultant

Dick Marty (7 January 1945 – 28 December 2023) was a Swiss politician (FDP.The Liberals) and state prosecutor of the canton of Ticino. He was a member of the Swiss Council of States (from 1995 to 2011) and of the Parliamentary Assembly of the Council of Europe.

== Early life ==
Marty was born in Sorengo, in Ticino, Switzerland. He held a doctorate in law from the University of Neuchâtel. His 1974 thesis was entitled, The Role and the Power of the Swiss Judge in the Application of Penal Sanctions (French: Le Rôle et les pouvoirs du juge suisse dans l'application des sanctions pénales).

== Professional career ==
=== Max Planck Institute ===
From 1972 to 1975, Marty worked at the Max Planck Institute for Foreign and International Criminal Law in Freiburg, Germany, responsible for the section on Swiss law.

=== State prosecutor ===
In 1975, Marty was nominated state prosecutor of Ticino, in which post he was specially noted for his energetic activities fighting organized crime and drug abuse. For his achievements in the area of drug legislation, he received in 1987 an Award of Honor of the United States Department of Justice and a special award of honor by the International Narcotic Enforcement Officers Association.

In 1995, upon being elected to the Swiss Council of States for Ticino, he resigned from his executive post and thereafter worked part-time as a legal and economic consultant.

=== NGO leadership ===
Marty was president of Tourism Switzerland from 1996 to 2007. He also served as president of the Swiss Scouting Foundation until 2010.

In 2014, Marty was appointed head of the Cycling Independent Reform Commission by the Union Cycliste Internationale, with a remit to investigate doping in the sport during the 1990s and 2000s.

== Political career ==
=== Government of Ticino ===
In 1989, Marty was elected a member of the cantonal executive in Ticino, where he was director of the finance department, and in 1992 additionally held the office of president, which rotates among the members.

=== Council of States ===
In the Council of States, Marty was a member of key commissions, including the Finance Commission and Economy and Taxes Commission.

=== Council of Europe ===
In 1998 Marty was appointed a member of the Parliamentary Assembly of the Council of Europe, where he became a member of its Monitoring Committee. He was later second vice-chairman of the Political Affairs Committee, with further positions in sub-committees.

==== Secret CIA prisons in Europe ====
In 2005, Marty was appointed to lead an investigation by the Council of Europe into alleged unlawful CIA black sites in Europe. Marty used satellite images and aviation logs, among many other sources of information, to find out whether the "rendition" of terror suspects for possible torture, or for secret detention, had taken place in any of the Council of Europe's 47 member states. Such activities would be a violation of European human rights standards. In June 2006 Marty released his report on behalf of the Parliamentary Assembly, concluding that evidence showed that fourteen European states had assisted in the perpetration of such abuses.

Marty published a second report a year later on 8 June 2007, named Secret Detentions and Illegal Transfers of Detainees Involving Council of Europe Member States: Second Report. This went further, revealing evidence that torture had taken place at secret CIA prisons located in Poland and Romania, prompting furious denials from both countries at the time, and provoking a global media storm. However, in an unfolding process of slowly accumulating evidence, drip-by-drip revelation and gradual admission on the part of the governments and government officials involved - a process described by Marty as "the dynamic of truth". The claim was subsequently confirmed by judicial rulings, parliamentary inquiries and media, including a series of landmark rulings by the European Court of Human Rights and the US Senate Intelligence Committee report on CIA torture.

==== Organ theft claim in Kosovo ====
On 14 December 2010, Marty published a report for adoption by the Council of Europe alleging inhuman treatment of people and killing of prisoners with the purpose of removal and illicit trafficking in human organs in Kosovo, involving Hashim Thaçi, the Kosovo prime minister and former Kosovo Liberation Army political leader.

Kosovo's leading politicians reacted strongly to Marty's report. Kosovo's acting president, Jakup Krasniqi, called the report "racist towards Albanians". Prime Minister Thaçi accused Marty of being "an opponent of Kosovo's independence" and called the report "politically motivated", "not based on facts", with the "goal to damage the newly-created state of Kosovo, Kosovo’s image, to question the election process, creation of institutions and Kosovo’s European future". As reported by several international, Serbian, Kosovan and Albanian news agencies, in an interview for Albanian TV Klan on 24 December 2010, Thaçi threatened to publish a list of Albanians who collaborated in providing information to Dick Marty for this report. On 25 January 2011, the Council of Europe endorsed the report and called for a full and serious investigation into its contents. Since the issuance of the report, however, senior sources in the European Union Rule of Law Mission in Kosovo (EULEX) and many members of the European Parliament have expressed serious doubts regarding the report and its foundations, believing Marty failed to provide "any evidence" concerning the allegations. On 14 September 2021, a Kosovan court based in the Hauge started proceedings against Thaçi, who remains under prosecution.

==== Euthanasia ====
Marty acted as Special Rapporteur for the Assembly's Social, Health and Family Affairs Committee on the topic of euthanasia. His report and draft resolution, published in September 2003, called on Council of Europe members to collect empirical data on assisted dying, to promote debate and analysis of the evidence, and to consider whether legislation should be brought forward to exempt doctors from prosecution for assisting suicide under certain strict conditions. His stance proved controversial and the report was criticised by a number of organisations, such as the World Federation of Catholic Medical Associations and the Scottish Council on Human Bioethics. John Keown, a professor of Christian ethics at Georgetown University in Washington, DC, described it as "Mr Marty's muddle" and criticized him for "superficiality" and "selectivity."

The Committee subsequently adopted an amended Opinion prepared by the British member Kevin McNamara, a conservative Catholic, who criticised several of Marty's findings and conclusions and sought to replace the call for governments to consider legislation to legalise assisted dying with a resolution to "report back to the Parliamentary Assembly for further consideration". McNamara's amendments were criticised in turn by organisations such as the World Federation of Right to Die Societies. Keown's criticism of Marty's report was criticised by Guy Widdershoven of Maastricht University. Marty's report, as amended by McNamara, was approved by the European Committee on Legal Affairs and Human Rights on 18 September 2003.

=== Ballot Initiative for Global Corporate Responsibility ===
As of 2015, Marty served as co-president for the ballot measure to amend the Swiss constitution so that global companies headquartered in Switzerland are adhering to human rights and environmental standards. In February 2019, the ballot measure initially passed the Swiss National Council and was modified by the Council of States, rejecting the counter-initiative by the National Council. At the ballot on 29 November 2020 50,7% of Swiss voters accepted the initiative, but it failed to become law since the majority of the Cantons rejected the text.

=== Assassination plot ===
In April 2022, Swiss media agency Swiss Info alleged Marty was the target of the Serbian Security Intelligence Agency who plotted to assassinate him and place the blame on Albanians to discredit Kosovo internationally. Swiss Info wrote that Marty was guarded by Swiss police over four months in 2020. The Serbian Security Intelligence Agency denied claims of the assassination plot. Marty stated the threats came from Serbian intelligence services who wanted to kill him in order to blame it on Kosovo Albanians.

== Death ==
Marty died on 28 December 2023, at the age of 78 from pancreatic cancer.

== See also ==
- Crime in Switzerland
