= Triangle Aviation Solutions =

Government Transportation Contractor

- Commenced operations: 1979; 47 years ago
- Operating bases: Johnston Regional Airport; Person County Airport
- Fleet size: 26 planes
- Headquarters: Smithfield, North Carolina, U.S.
- Founder: Jim Rhyne

Triangle Aviation Solutions, previously known as Aero Contractors Ltd., is a CIA front airline noted for operating CIA extraordinary rendition flights.

A European Parliament report in 2006 stated:

According to FAA records, Aero Contractors leases its planes from Premier Executive Transport (shell company) [...]. Aero Contractors has no web site and does not advertise its activities. All the resources come from the CIA, from the US Army and other Government agencies. However, Aero Contractors remains a real company [i.e. not a shell company], with premises and eighty employees.

== Extraordinary Rendition Flights ==
Multiple European and American investigations have named Aero Contractors (and connected shell companies) as part of a network of CIA planes, airlines, and flights that transported prisoners repeatedly to countries known for torture and imprisonment without trial. The European Parliament report led to a resolution that condemned extraordinary rendition and stated the CIA was responsible for "illegal seizure, removal, abduction, and detention of terrorist suspects" in Europe specifically and in violation of international law and fundamental human rights.

On May 31, 2005, The New York Times reported that the company was heavily involved in extraordinary rendition, the transport of terrorism suspects to countries where they can be interrogated to extract information. An Aero Contractors plane was used (registration N313P) in the transport of Khalid El-Masri, a German citizen who was pulled from a bus on the Serbia-Macedonia border and held for three weeks. He was drugged and beaten before being flown to Afghanistan on a Boeing Business Jet operated by Aero Contractors. El-Masri was released after five months.

A book published in September 2006, Torture Taxi: On the Trail of the CIA Rendition Flights includes many details about Aero Contractors' involvement in extraordinary rendition.

== Front and Shell Company Connections ==
A European Parliament reported stated that Aero Contractors was the operating company of several shell companies, including Stevens Express Leasing, Inc., Premier Executive Transport Services, Aviation Specialties, Inc., Aero LLC (Wyoming) and Devon Holding and Leasing, Inc., and was part of a network of US companies, including Pegasus Technologies and Tepper Aviation, who operated airplanes for the CIA.

== Origin and Growth ==
The company was founded in 1979 was based in Smithfield, North Carolina by Jim Rhyne, a former pilot with the CIA front Air America. The company had 26 planes and 79 employees and operated from the tiny Johnston Regional Airport. During the CIA's extraordinary rendition operations from 2001 to 2004, Aero's staff grew from 48 to 79.

== See also ==
- Jeppesen
- Rendition aircraft
- Tepper Aviation
- Gulf Air Group
- Pallas Aviation
