= Extraordinary rendition =

State-sponsored abduction and transfer to a third state

Extraordinary rendition is a euphemistically named policy of state-sponsored abduction in a foreign jurisdiction and transfer to a third state. The best-known use of extraordinary rendition is in a United States-led program during the war on terror, which circumvented the source country's laws on interrogation, detention, extradition and/or torture. Extraordinary rendition is a type of extraterritorial abduction, but not all extraterritorial abductions include transfer to a third country.

Extraordinary rendition began under the administration of President Bill Clinton and continued under the administration of President George W. Bush, which abducted hundreds of "illegal combatants" for U.S. detention and transported them to U.S.-controlled sites as part of an extensive interrogation program that included torture. Extraordinary rendition continued under the Obama administration, with targets being interrogated and subsequently taken to the U.S. for trial. A 2018 report by the Intelligence and Security Committee of Parliament found the United Kingdom, specifically MI5 and MI6, to be complicit in many of the renditions carried out by the U.S., by helping to fund them, by supplying intelligence, and by knowingly allowing the abductions to happen.

In July 2014, the European Court of Human Rights condemned the government of Poland for participating in CIA extraordinary rendition, ordering Poland to pay restitution to men who had been abducted, taken to a CIA black site in Poland, and tortured. Torture is banned under the European Convention on Human Rights, which 46 nations, including Poland, have pledged to uphold.

== Background ==
By 2004, critics alleged that torture was used against subjects with the knowledge or acquiescence of the United States, where the transfer of a person for the purpose of torture is unlawful. In addition, some former detainees, such as the Australian citizen Mamdouh Habib, claimed to have been transferred to other countries for interrogation under torture. In December 2005, then Secretary of State Condoleezza Rice insisted:

The United States has not transported anyone, and will not transport anyone, to a country when we believe he will be tortured. Where appropriate, the United States seeks assurances that transferred persons will not be tortured.

Between 2001 and 2005, CIA officers captured an estimated one hundred fifty people and transported them around the world.

Under the Bush administration, rendered persons were reported to have undergone torture by receiving countries. Journalists, civil and constitutional rights groups, and former detainees have alleged that this occurred with the knowledge or cooperation of the administrations of the United States and the United Kingdom.

Such revelations prompted several official investigations into alleged secret detentions and unlawful interstate transfers involving Council of Europe members. A June 2006 report estimated that 100 people had been kidnapped by the CIA on European Union soil with the cooperation of Council of Europe members and rendered to other countries, often after having transited through secret detention centers ("black sites"), some located in Europe. According to the separate European Parliament report of February 2007, the CIA has conducted 1,245 flights, many of them to destinations where suspects could face torture, in violation of Article 3 of the United Nations Convention Against Torture. A large majority of the European Union Parliament endorsed the report's conclusion that many member states tolerated illegal actions by the CIA, criticizing several European governments and intelligence agencies for their unwillingness to cooperate with the investigation.

Within days of his 2009 inauguration, Barack Obama signed an executive order opposing rendition torture and established a task force to provide recommendations about processes to prevent rendition torture. His administration distanced itself from some of the harshest counterterrorism techniques but permitted the practice of rendition to continue, restricting transport of suspects to countries with jurisdiction over them for the purpose of prosecution after diplomatic assurances "that they [would] not be treated inhumanely" had been received.

== Definitions ==
Rendition, in law, is a transfer of persons from one jurisdiction to another, and the act of handing over, both after legal proceedings and according to law. "Extraordinary rendition," however, is a rendition that is extralegal, i.e. outside the law (see: kidnapping). Rendition refers to the transfer; the apprehension, detention, interrogation, and any other practices occurring before and after the movement and exchange of extrajudicial prisoners do not fall into the strict definition of extraordinary rendition. In practice, the term is widely used to describe such practices, particularly the initial apprehension. This latter usage extends to the transfer of suspected terrorists by the US to countries known to torture prisoners or employ harsh interrogation techniques that may rise to the level of torture.

The Bush administration freely admitted to this practice; stating, among other provisions, that they have specifically asked that torture not be used. However, torture can still occur despite these provisions, and much documentation exists alleging that it has happened in many cases. In these instances, the initial captor allows the possibility of torture by releasing the prisoner into the custody of nations that practice torture.

The next distinction of degree is that of intent, where much of the search for evidence continues. It has been alleged that some of those detainees have been tortured with the knowledge, acquiescence, or even participation of US agencies. A transfer of anyone to anywhere for torture would be a violation of US law. New York attorney Marc D. Falkoff stated that such evidence, i.e. transfer for the purposes of torture, was an operational practice. In a court filing, Falkoff described a classified prisoner transfer memo from Guantanamo as noting that information could not be retrieved, as torture could not be used, and recommending that the prisoner be sent to a nation that practiced torture.

== Historical instances ==
=== Historical cases ===
The American Civil Liberties Union alleges that extraordinary rendition was developed during the Clinton administration. CIA officials in the mid-1990s were trying to track down and dismantle militant Islamic organizations in the Middle East, particularly Al Qaeda.

According to Clinton administration official Richard Clarke:

'extraordinary renditions', were operations to apprehend terrorists abroad, usually without the knowledge of and almost always without public acknowledgment of the host government ... The first time I proposed a snatch, in 1993, the White House Counsel, Lloyd Cutler, demanded a meeting with the President to explain how it violated international law. Clinton had seemed to be siding with Cutler until Al Gore belatedly joined the meeting, having just flown overnight from South Africa. Clinton recapped the arguments on both sides for Gore: 'Lloyd says this. Dick says that.' Gore laughed and said, 'That's a no-brainer. Of course it's a violation of international law, that's why it's a covert action. The guy is a terrorist. Go grab his ass.'

Both the Bush and Clinton cases involved apprehending known terrorists abroad, by covert means if necessary. The Bush administration expanded the policy after the 9/11 attacks.

In a New Yorker interview with CIA veteran Michael Scheuer, an author of the rendition program under the Clinton administration, writer Jane Mayer noted:

In 1995, American agents proposed the rendition program to Egypt, making clear that it had the resources to track, capture, and transport terrorist suspects globally – including access to a small fleet of aircraft. Egypt embraced the idea ... 'What was clever was that some of the senior people in Al Qaeda were Egyptian,' Scheuer said. 'It served American purposes to get these people arrested, and Egyptian purposes to get these people back, where they could be interrogated.' Technically, U.S. law requires the CIA to seek 'assurances' from foreign governments that rendered suspects won't be tortured. Scheuer told me that this was done, but he was 'not sure' if any documents confirming the arrangement were signed.

Scheuer testified in 2007 before Congress that no such assurances were received. He acknowledged that treatment of prisoners may not have been "up to U.S. standards":

This is a matter of no concern as the Rendition Program's goal was to protect America. The rendered fighters delivered to Middle Eastern governments are now either dead or in places from which they cannot harm America. Mission accomplished, as the saying goes.

Thereafter, with the approval of President Clinton and a presidential directive (PDD 39), the CIA elected to send suspects to Egypt, where they were turned over to the Egyptian Mukhabarat. (→ Tal'at Fu'ad Qasim)

=== 20th century ===
The CIA was granted permission to use rendition of indicted terrorists to American soil in a 1995 presidential directive signed by President Bill Clinton, following a procedure established by George H. W. Bush in January 1993.

The United States has since increasingly used rendition as a tool in the "war on terror", ignoring the normal extradition processes outlined in international law. Suspects taken into United States custody are delivered to third-party states, often without ever having been on United States soil, and without involving the rendering countries.

Critics have accused the CIA of employing rendition for the purpose of circumventing American laws mandating due process and prohibiting torture, labeling the practice "torture flights". Sociological comparisons have been drawn between extraordinary rendition and the death flights implemented, most notably, by Argentina during the 1960s and 1970s. Defenders of the practice argue that culturally informed and native-language interrogations are more successful in gaining information from suspects.

Hundreds of documents retrieved from Libyan foreign ministry offices in Tripoli following the 2011 Libyan civil war show that the CIA and MI6 rendered suspects to Libyan authorities knowing they would be tortured.

In a number of cases, such as those of Khalid El-Masri and Maher Arar, suspects caught up in the procedure suffered lengthy detentions, despite ultimately being found innocent. The CIA reportedly launched an investigation into such incidents of "erroneous rendition".

=== 21st century ===
The U.S. and suspected CIA "black sites" Extraordinary renditions allegedly have been carried out from these countries. Detainees have allegedly been transported through these countries. Detainees have allegedly arrived in these countries. Sources: Amnesty International, Human Rights Watch

Following the 11 September 2001 attacks the United States, in particular the CIA, has been accused of rendering hundreds of people suspected by the government of being terrorists—or of aiding and abetting terrorist organizations—to third-party states such as Egypt, Jordan, Morocco, and Uzbekistan. Such "ghost detainees" are kept outside judicial oversight, often without ever entering US territory, and may or may not ultimately be transferred to the custody of the United States.

According to a 4 December 2005 article in The Washington Post by Dana Priest:

Members of the Rendition Group follow a simple but standard procedure: Dressed head to toe in black, including masks, they blindfold and cut the clothes off their new captives, then administer an enema and sleeping drugs. They outfit detainees in a diaper and jumpsuit for what can be a day-long trip. Their destinations: either a detention facility operated by cooperative countries in the Middle East and Central Asia, including Afghanistan, or one of the CIA's own covert prisons—referred to in classified documents as "black sites", which at various times have been operated in eight countries, including several in Eastern Europe.

Following mounting scrutiny in Europe, including investigations held by the Swiss State Councillor Dick Marty who released a public report in June 2006, the US Senate, in December 2005, was about to approve a measure that would include amendments requiring the director of national intelligence to provide regular, detailed updates about secret detention facilities maintained by the United States overseas, and to account for the treatment and condition of each prisoner.

== Reported methods ==
Media reports describe suspects as being arrested, blindfolded, shackled, and sedated, or otherwise kidnapped, and transported by private jet or other means to the destination country. The reports also say that the rendering countries have provided interrogators with lists of questions. Detainees, referred to as enemy combatants by the US administration, were commonly hooded and tethered to the floor of cargo planes during flights. As their movement was restricted by shackles they were required to wear diapers during the entire duration of flights.

=== Airline flights ===
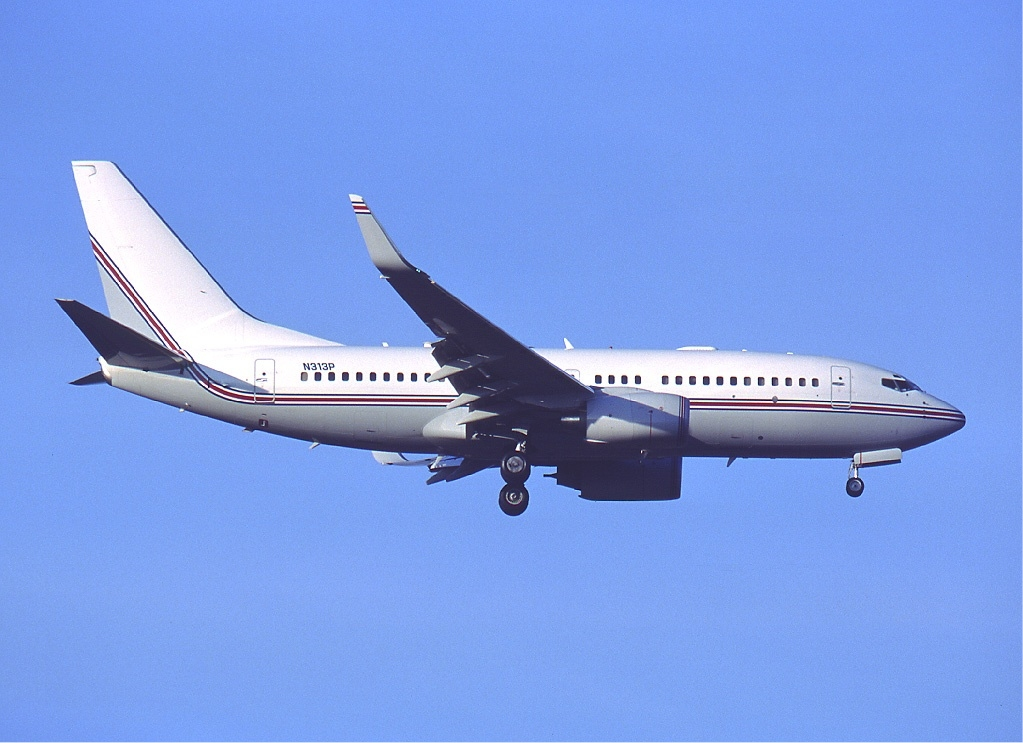
Boeing 737-700 of PETS in Frankfurt, Germany on 11 January 2003

On 4 October 2001, a secret arrangement was made in Brussels by all members of NATO. Lord George Robertson, British defense secretary and later NATO's secretary-general, would later explain NATO members agreed to provide "blanket overflight clearances for the United States and other allies' aircraft for military flights related to operations against terrorism."

==== Boeing Jeppesen international trip planning ====
On 23 October 2006, the New Yorker reported that Jeppesen, a subsidiary of Boeing, handled the logistical planning for the CIA's extraordinary rendition flights. The allegation is based on information from an ex-employee who quoted Bob Overby, managing director of the company as saying "We do all of the extraordinary rendition flights—you know, the torture flights. Let's face it, some of these flights end up that way. It certainly pays well." The article went on to suggest that this may make Jeppesen a potential defendant in a lawsuit by Khaled El-Masri. Jeppesen was named as a defendant in a lawsuit filed by the ACLU on 30 May 2007, on behalf of several other individuals who were allegedly subject to extraordinary rendition.

The suit was dismissed on 8 September 2010 by a federal appeals court because "going forward would reveal state secrets".

=== Black sites ===
In 2005, The Washington Post and Human Rights Watch (HRW) published revelations concerning CIA flights and "black sites", covert prisons operated by the CIA and whose existence is denied by the US government. The European Parliament published a report in February 2007 concerning the use of such secret detention centers and extraordinary rendition (See below). These detention centers violate the European Convention on Human Rights (ECHR) and the UN Convention Against Torture, treaties that all EU member states are bound to follow.

According to ABC News two such facilities, in countries mentioned by Human Rights Watch, have been closed following the publicity. CIA officers say the captives were relocated to the North African desert. All but one of these 11 high-value al Qaeda prisoners were subjected to torture by the CIA, sometimes referred to as "enhanced interrogation techniques" authorized for use by about 14 CIA officers.

==== Extraordinary renditions and black sites in Europe ====
Alleged "extraordinary rendition" illegal flights of the CIA, as reported by Rzeczpospolita

In January 2005, Swiss senator Dick Marty, representative at the Council of Europe in charge of the European investigations, concluded that 100 people had been kidnapped by the CIA in Europe—thus qualifying as ghost detainees—and then rendered to a country where they may have been tortured. Marty qualified the sequestration of Hassan Mustafa Osama Nasr (aka "Abu Omar") in Milan in February 2003 as a "perfect example of extraordinary rendition." (See below: Council of Europe investigation and its two reports)

The Guardian reported on 5 December 2005, that the government of the United Kingdom is "guilty of breaking international law if it knowingly allowed secret CIA "rendition" flights of terror suspects to land at UK airports, according to a report by American legal scholars."

According to Raw Story, the Polish site identified by reporter Larisa Alexandrovna Horton and Polish intelligence officer David Dastych is Stare Kiejkuty. In response to these allegations, former Polish intelligence chief, Zbigniew Siemiatkowski, embarked on a media blitz and claimed that the allegations made by Alexandrovna and Dastych were "... part of the domestic political battle in the US over who is to succeed current Republican President George W Bush," according to the German news agency Deutsche Presse Agentur."

==== Prison ships ====
The United States has also been accused of operating "floating prisons" to house and transport those arrested in its War on Terror, according to human rights lawyers. They have claimed that the US has tried to conceal the numbers and whereabouts of detainees. Although no credible information to support these assertions has ever come to light, the alleged justification for prison ships is primarily to remove the ability for jihadists to target a fixed location to facilitate the escape of high value targets, commanders, operations chiefs etc.

== Example cases ==
=== Khaled Masri case ===
Khalid El-Masri (born 1963) is a German citizen who was mistakenly abducted by the Macedonian police, and handed over to the U.S. CIA. While in CIA custody, he was flown to Afghanistan, where he was allegedly held in a black site, interrogated, beaten, strip-searched, sodomized, and subjected to other inhuman and degrading treatment, which at times escalated to torture, though none of those claims can be verified. After El-Masri held hunger strikes, and was detained for four months in the "Salt Pit", the CIA finally admitted his arrest was a mistake and released him. He is believed to be among an estimated 3,000 detainees, including several key leaders of al Qaeda, whom the CIA captured from 2001 to 2005, in its campaign to dismantle terrorist networks.

=== Abu Omar case ===
In 2003, Hassan Mustafa Osama Nasr (aka "Abu Omar") was kidnapped by the CIA in Milan (Italy), and deported to Egypt, where he was interrogated by the State Security Investigations Service. His case has been characterized by the Swiss senator Dick Marty as a "perfect example of extraordinary rendition". Abu Omar was kidnapped as he walked to his mosque in Milan for noon prayers. He was transported on a Learjet (using the call sign SPAR 92) to Ramstein, Germany. SPAR (Special Air Resources) is the call sign used by US senior military officers and civilian VIPs for airlift transport. A second plane took him to Cairo, where he was imprisoned and, he claims, tortured.

In 2005, the Italian judge Guido Salvini issued a warrant for the arrest of 13 persons said to be agents or operatives of the CIA in association with Nasr's kidnapping. In December 2005, an Italian court issued a European arrest warrant against 22 CIA agents suspected of this kidnapping (including Robert Seldon Lady, Eliana Castaldo, Lt. Col. Joseph L. Romano, III, etc.). The CIA has not commented on the case, while Berlusconi's government has denied any knowledge of a kidnapping plot. Just after the 2006 Italian general elections, Roberto Castelli (Lega Nord), outgoing Justice Minister, declared to Italian prosecutors that he had not passed the extradition request to the US.

In 2005, The Washington Post reported Italian court documents which showed that the CIA tried to mislead Italian anti-terrorism police who were looking for the cleric at the time. Robert S. Lady, the CIA's substation chief in Milan, has been implicated in the abduction. In a written opinion upholding the arrest warrant, judge Enrico Manzi wrote that the evidence taken from Lady's home "removes any doubt about his participation in the preparatory phase of the abduction." Lady, however, alleged that the evidence had been gathered illegally, and has denied involvement in the abduction. Photos of Robert (Bob) Lady and other defendants surfaced on the Web.

Marco Mancini, the SISMI director of anti-terrorism and counterespionage, and Gustavo Pignero, the department's director in 2003, have been arrested on charges of complicity in a kidnapping, with the aggravating circumstances of abuse of power. Italian judges have issued 26 EU arrest warrants for U.S. citizens in connection with this event. A judge also issued arrest warrants for four Americans, three CIA agents and an Air Force officer who commanded the security forces at Aviano Air Base at the time of the abduction.

In 2007, Nasr's lawyer said Egypt had released him and he was back with his family.

In 2009, an Italian judge convicted 22 suspected or known CIA agents, a U.S. Air Force (USAF) colonel, and two Italian secret agents of the kidnapping. These were the first legal convictions in the world against people involved in the CIA's extraordinary renditions program.

=== Majid Mahmud Abdu Ahmad case ===
A story in the Los Angeles Times in 2005 seems to corroborate the claims of "torture by proxy." It mentions the attorneys for Majid Mahmud Abdu Ahmad, a detainee held by the Pentagon at Guantanamo Bay, filed a petition to prevent his being transferred to foreign countries. According to the petition's description of a redacted classified Defense Department memo from 2004, its contents say "officials suggested sending Ahmad to an unspecified foreign country that employed torture in order to increase chances of extracting information from him."

Mr Falkoff, representing Ahmad, continued: "There is only one meaning that can be gleaned from this short passage," the petition says. "The government believes that Mr. Ahmad has information that it wants but that it cannot extract without torturing him." The petition goes on to say that because torture is not allowed at Guantanamo, "the recommendation is that Mr. Ahmad should be sent to another country where he can be interrogated under torture." In a report, regarding the allegations of CIA flights, on 13 December 2005, the rapporteur and Chair of the Parliamentary Assembly of the Council of Europe's Committee on Legal Affairs and Human Rights, Swiss councillor Dick Marty, concluded: "The elements we have gathered so far tend to reinforce the credibility of the allegations concerning the transport and temporary detention of detainees—outside all judicial procedure—in European countries." In a press conference in January 2006, he stated "he was personally convinced the US had undertaken illegal activities in Europe in transporting and detaining prisoners."

=== Muhammad Bashmila case ===
Muhammad Bashmila, a former secret prisoner, now free in Yemen, gave an interview to the BBC Newsnight programme, where he spoke of being transferred from Afghanistan to a detention center where it was cold, where the food appeared European and where evening prayers were held. Somewhere in Eastern Europe is suspected. This claim cannot be confirmed.

=== Maher Arar case ===
Maher Arar, a Syrian-born dual Syrian and Canadian citizen, was detained at Kennedy International Airport on 26 September 2002, by US Immigration and Naturalization Service officials. He was heading home to Canada after a family holiday in Tunisia. After almost two weeks, enduring hours of interrogation chained, he was sent, shackled and bound, in a private jet to Jordan and then Syria, instead of being deported to Canada. There, he was interrogated and tortured by Syrian intelligence. Maher Arar was eventually released a year later. He told the BBC that he was repeatedly tortured during 10 months' detention in Syria—often whipped on the palms of his hands with metal cables. Syrian intelligence officers forced him to sign a confession linking him to Al Qaeda.

He was finally released following intervention by the Canadian government. The Canadian government lodged an official complaint with the US government protesting Arar's deportation. On 18 September 2006, a Canadian public enquiry presented its findings, entirely clearing Arar of any terrorist activities. In 2004 Arar filed a lawsuit in a federal court in New York against senior U.S. officials, on charges that whoever sent him to Syria knew he would be tortured by intelligence agents. US Attorney General John Ashcroft, Homeland Security Secretary Tom Ridge and FBI Director Robert Mueller were all named in the lawsuit. In 2009, a U.S. federal appeals court ruled that U.S. law did not allow victims of extraordinary rendition to sue U.S. officials for torture suffered overseas.

In 2006, Arar received the Letelier-Moffitt Human Rights Award from the Institute for Policy Studies for his ordeal. In 2007, Maher Arar received a public apology from the U.S. House of Representatives. U.S. representative Dana Rohrabacher, who apologized, stated that he would fight any efforts to end the practice.

In 2007, Arar was awarded $10.5 million in compensation from the Canadian government for pain and suffering in his ordeal and a formal apology from Prime Minister Stephen Harper.

== Other cases ==
This is a non-exhaustive list of some alleged examples of extraordinary rendition. Most cannot be confirmed.

- A Pakistani newspaper reported that in the early hours of 23 October 2001 a Yemeni citizen, Jamil Qasim Saeed Mohammed, a 27-year-old microbiology student at Karachi University, was spirited aboard a private plane at Karachi's airport by Pakistani security officers.
- In October 2001, Mamdouh Habib, who lives in Australia and has both Australian and Egyptian nationality (having been born in Egypt), was detained in Pakistan, where he was interrogated for three weeks, and then flown to Egypt in a private plane. From Egypt, he was later flown to a US airbase in Afghanistan. He told the BBC that he did not know who had held him, but had seen Americans, Australians, Pakistanis, and Egyptians among his captors. He also said that he had been beaten, given electric shocks, deprived of sleep, blindfolded for eight months and brainwashed. After signing confessions of involvement with al-Qaeda, which he has now retracted, Mr Habib was transferred to Guantanamo Bay. He was released without charge in January 2005. Former Pakistani interior minister Makhdoom Syed Faisal Saleh Hayat told in an interview by the Australian current affairs programme Dateline that Mr Habib was linked with the "terrorist element" operating at that time. However, he contradicted himself a few minutes later, in the same interview, saying that Habib had been assumed guilty because he was in the restricted province of Baluchistan without proper visa documents.
- In late 2001 Saddiq Ahmad Turkistani was freed by US forces from a Taliban prison in Kandahar, Afghanistan. At a news conference, he told reporters and U.S. officials he had been wrongly imprisoned for allegedly plotting to kill Osama bin Laden. He was then taken to a U.S. military base in Afghanistan, where he was stripped, bound and thrown behind bars. According to U.S. lawyers who represent him, in January 2002 he was sent to the U.S. detention facility at Guantanamo Bay, Cuba. Nearly four years later, Turkistani remained there, despite being cleared for release early 2005 after a government review concluded he is "no longer an enemy combatant." It is unclear exactly when that determination was made, but Justice Department lawyers gave notice of it in an 11 October court filing. According to a 26 June 2006 press release from the Saudi Arabian embassy, Turkistani was released from Guantanamo to Saudi custody.
- In 2002, captured Al Qaeda leader Ibn al-Shaykh al-Libi was rendered to Egypt where he was allegedly tortured. The information he provided to his interrogators formed a fundamental part of the Bush administration case for attacking Iraq, alleging links between Al Qaeda and Iraq. Al-Libi later recanted his story and it is generally believed that his stories of contact between the Saddam Hussein regime and Al-Qaeda were fabricated to please his interrogators.
- Ahmed Agiza and Muhammad al-Zery, two Egyptians who had been seeking asylum in Sweden, were arrested by Swedish police in December 2001. They were taken to Bromma airport in Stockholm, had their clothes cut from their bodies, suppositories were inserted in their anuses and they were put in diapers, overalls, hoods, hand and ankle cuffs, they were then put onto a jet with American registration N379P with a crew of masked men. They were flown to Egypt, where they were imprisoned, beaten, and tortured according to Swedish investigative programme Kalla fakta. The Swedish ambassador visited them only six weeks later. Agiza was previously charged and sentenced in absentia with being an Islamic militant and was sentenced to 25 years, a sentence that was reduced to 15 years due to the political pressure after the Rendition became known. Al-Zery wasn't charged, and after two years in jail without ever seeing a judge or prosecutor he was sent to his village in Egypt. In 2008 Al-Zery was awarded $500,000 in damages by the Swedish government for the wrongful treatment he received in Sweden and the subsequent torture in Egypt.
- In March 2002, Abou Elkassim Britel, an Italian citizen with Moroccan origins, was arrested in Pakistan and subsequently interrogated by Pakistani and US officials. He was then rendered to Moroccan authorities, detained and tortured in a secret Temara interrogation centre. He was finally released without any charges brought against him, before being rearrested in May 2003 at the border crossing of the Spanish enclave of Melilla in North Africa. He is currently imprisoned in Äin Bourja prison in Casablanca after having been sentenced to nine years in January 2004 for membership of a subversive organisation and for activities including holding unauthorised meetings. This in spite of conclusions in September 2006 by Italian Justice, after a five years investigation, that there was "an absolute lack of grounds of evidence of charge which may be used in trial" and that the suspicion motivating the inquiries had proved unfounded. Nonetheless, allegations in the Italian press and the judicial proceedings that were underway in Italy influenced court proceedings against Britel in Morocco that led to him being sentenced. MPs from Italy and from the European Parliament are set to ask the Moroccan Royal Cabinet to grant a pardon to the Italian citizen. According to the European Parliament Temporary Committee on the Alleged Use of European Countries by the CIA for the Transport and the Illegal Detention of Prisoners headed by rapporteur Claudio Fava, documents demonstrated that "the Italian judicial authorities and the Italian Ministry for Home Affairs (the latter, acting on behalf of the Direzione Centrale della Polizia di Prevenzione cited in connection with the investigation by the Divisione Investigazioni Generali ed Operazioni Speciali) cooperated constantly with foreign secret services and were well aware of all Britel's movements and whatever unlawful treatments he received, from the time of his initial arrest in Pakistan."
- In 2003, an Algerian named Laid Saidi was abducted in Tanzania and taken to Afghanistan, where he was imprisoned and tortured along with Khalid El-Masri. His detention appears to have arisen through a mistranslation of a telephone conversation, in which U.S. officials believed he was speaking about airplanes (tairat in Arabic) when he had in fact been speaking about tires (tirat in Arabic).
- Binyam Mohammed, an Ethiopian student who lived in London, was apprehended in Pakistan in April 2002. He allegedly spent three years in "black sites," including in Morocco and Afghanistan. He was supposed to be part of a plot involving José Padilla. The Observer reported: "He went to Pakistan in June 2001 because, he says, he had a drug problem and wanted to quit. He was arrested on 10 April at the airport on his way back to England because of an alleged passport irregularity. Initially interrogated by Pakistani and British officials, he told Stafford Smith: "The British checked out my story and said they knew I was a nobody. They said they would tell the Americans." He was deprived of sleep by having heavy rock music played loudly throughout the day and night.
- On 13 December 2004, Rodrigo Granda, a FARC terrorist was captured in Caracas, Venezuela by a group of Colombian intelligence officials. Granda was clandestinely transported to the Colombian city of Cúcuta, near the border with Venezuela, where his capture was legalised by the corresponding authorities. After the capture of Granda became publicly known, the Venezuelan Government broke relations with Colombia as response of violations to its sovereignty.
- On 5 April 2006, Amnesty International released details of the United States' system of extraordinary rendition, stating that three Yemeni citizens were held somewhere in Eastern Europe.
- On 21 February 2008, British foreign secretary David Miliband admitted that two United States extraordinary rendition flights refuelled on Diego Garcia in 2002, and was "very sorry" that earlier denials by British government ministers were having to be corrected.
- The case of Mohammed Haydar Zammar, now a terrorist for ISIL.

== Investigations ==
=== Investigations by multi-nation groups ===
==== Council of Europe investigation and its two reports ====
On 25 November 2005, the lead investigator for the Council of Europe, Swiss lawmaker Dick Marty announced that he had obtained latitude and longitude coordinates for suspected black sites, and he was planning to use satellite imagery over the last several years as part of his investigation. On 28 November 2005, EU Justice Commissioner Franco Frattini asserted that any EU country which had operated a secret prison would have its voting rights suspended. In a preliminary report, Dick Marty declared that it was "doubtful that European governments, or at least their intelligence services, were unaware" of the CIA kidnapping of a "hundred" persons on European territory and their subsequent rendition to countries where they may be tortured.

The report from the Committee on Legal Affairs and Human Rights of the Council of Europe directed by Dick Marty, and made public on 7 June 2006, was titled: "Alleged secret detentions and unlawful inter-state transfers involving Council of Europe member states."

Following the publication of this report, the Council of Europe published its draft Recommendation and Resolution document which found grounds for concern with the conduct of both the US and member states of the EU and expresses concern for the disregard of international law and the Geneva Convention. Following a 23-point resolution the document makes five recommendations.

- 1 refers to its Resolution on alleged secret detentions and unlawful inter-state transfers involving Council of Europe member states.
- 2 recalling its previous recommendation on the legality of the detention of persons by the United States in Guantanamo Bay
- 3 urges the Committee of Ministers to draft a recommendation to Council of Europe member States containing:

common measures to guarantee more effectively the human rights of persons suspected of terrorist offences who are captured from, detained in or transported through Council of Europe member States; and a set of minimum requirements for "human rights protection clauses", for inclusion in bilateral and multilateral agreements with third parties, especially those concerning the use of military installations on the territory of Council of Europe member States.

- 4 urgently requests that: an initiative be launched on an international level, expressly involving the United States, an Observer to the Council of Europe, to develop a common, truly global strategy to address the terrorist threat. The strategy should conform in all its elements with the fundamental principles of our common heritage in terms of democracy, human rights and respect for the rule of law. Also, a proposal be considered, in instances where States are unable or unwilling to prosecute persons accused of terrorist acts, to bring these persons within the jurisdiction of an international court that is competent to try them. One possibility worth considering would be to vest such a competence in the International Criminal Court, whilst renewing invitations to join the Court to the United States and other countries that have not yet done so.
- 5 recommends improving the Council of Europe's ability to react rapidly and effectively to allegations of systematic human rights abuse involving several member States.

Several months before the publication of the Council of Europe report directed by Dick Marty, Gijs de Vries, the EU's antiterrorism coordinator, asserted in April 2006 that no evidence existed that extraordinary rendition had been taking place in Europe. It was also said that the European Union's probe, and a similar one by the continent's leading human rights group had not found any human rights violations nor other crimes that could be proven to the satisfaction of the courts. This denial from a member of the executive power of the EU institutions has been questioned by the European Parliament report, which was accepted by a vast majority of the Parliament in February 2007 (See below:The European Parliament's 14 February 2007 report).

On the other hand, Dick Marty explained the difference of approach concerning terrorism between the EU and the US as following:

While the states of the Old World have dealt with these threats primarily by means of existing institutions and legal systems, the United States appears to have made a fundamentally different choice: considering that neither conventional judicial instruments nor those established under the framework of the laws of war could effectively counter the new forms of international terrorism, it decided to develop new legal concepts. This legal approach is utterly alien to the European tradition and sensibility, and is clearly contrary to the European Convention on Human Rights and the Universal Declaration of Human Rights.

However, despite Marty's claims, the European Parliament investigations uncovered cooperation between European secret services and governments and the extraordinary renditions programs, making such a clear-cut distinction over-simplistic (see below). Dick Marty himself has not accepted such a dualistic approach, as he showed that for the British government also, the phenomenon of Islamic terrorism was alleged to be so grave that the balance of liberties had to be reconsidered. Marty's report stated that:

The compilation of so-called "black lists" of individuals and companies suspected of maintaining connections with organisations considered terrorist and the application of the associated sanctions clearly breach every principle of the fundamental right to a fair trial: no specific charges, no right to be heard, no right of appeal, no established procedure for removing one's name from the list.

The second report was released on 8 June 2007

==== 27 June 2006 Council of Europe resolution ====
The Parliamentary Assembly of the Council of Europe (PACE) accused the United States of operating a "clandestine spiderweb of disappearances, secret detentions and unlawful inter-state transfers" and called for EU regulations governing foreign intelligence services operating in Europe, and demanded "human rights clauses" in military base agreements with the USA.

In a resolution and recommendation approved by a large majority, the Assembly also called for:

- The dismantling by the US of its system of detentions and transfers.
- A review of bilateral agreements between Council of Europe member states and the US, particularly on the status of US forces stationed in Europe and on the use of military and other instrastructures, to ensure they conform to international human rights norms.
- Official apologies and compensation for victims of illegal detentions against whom no formal accusations, nor any court proceedings, have ever been brought
- An international initiative, expressly involving the United States, to develop a common, truly global strategy to address the terrorist threat which conforms to democracy, human rights and the rule of law.

==== European Parliament's investigation and report ====
The European Parliament launched its own investigation into the reports. In April 2006, MEPs leading the investigations expressed concerns that the CIA had conducted more than 1,000 secret flights over European territory since 2001, some to transfer terror suspects to countries that used torture. Investigators said that the same US agents and planes were involved over and over again. The Parliament adopted a resolution in July 2006 endorsing the Council of Europe's conclusions, midway through its own investigation into the alleged program.

"In a resolution passed on 14 February 2007 MEPs approved by a large majority (382 voting in favour, 256 against and 74 abstaining) their committee's final report, which criticized the rendition program and concluded that many European countries tolerated illegal CIA activities including secret flights over their territories. The countries named were: Austria, Belgium, Cyprus, Denmark, Germany, Greece, Ireland, Italy, Poland, Portugal, Romania, Spain, Sweden and the United Kingdom. The report ...

Denounces the lack of co-operation of many member states and of the Council of the European Union with the investigation;

Regrets that European countries have been relinquishing control over their airspace and airports by turning a blind eye or admitting flights operated by the CIA which, on some occasions, were being used for illegal transportation of detainees;

Calls for the closure of [the US military detention mission in] Guantanamo and for European countries immediately to seek the return of their citizens and residents who are being held illegally by the US authorities;

Considers that all European countries should initiate independent investigations into all stopovers by civilian aircraft [hired by] the CIA;

Urges that a ban or system of inspections be introduced for all CIA-operated aircraft known to have been involved in extraordinary rendition.

According to the report, the CIA had operated 1,245 flights, many of them to destinations where suspects could face torture. The Parliament also called for the creation of an independent investigation commission and the closure of the Guantanamo camp. According to Italian Socialist Gianni Fava, who drafted the document, there was a "strong possibility" that the intelligence obtained under the illegal extraordinary rendition program had been passed on to EU governments who were aware of how it was obtained. The report also uncovered the use of secret detention facilities used in Europe, including Romania and Poland. The report defines extraordinary renditions as instances where "an individual suspected of involvement in terrorism is illegally abducted, arrested and/or transferred into the custody of US officials and/or transported to another country for interrogation which, in the majority of cases involves incommunicado detention and torture".

==== UN report by Manfred Nowak ====
Manfred Nowak, a special reporter on torture, has catalogued in a 15-page U.N. report presented to the 191-member General Assembly that the United States, the United Kingdom, Canada, France, Sweden and Kyrgyzstan are violating international human rights conventions by deporting terrorist suspects to countries such as Egypt, Syria, Algeria and Uzbekistan, where they may have been tortured.

"The United States is holding at least 26 persons as "ghost detainees" at undisclosed locations outside of the United States," Human Rights Watch said on 1 December 2005, as it released a list naming some of the detainees. The detainees are being held indefinitely and incommunicado, without legal rights or access to counsel.

=== Investigations by NGOs ===
==== World Policy Council report ====
The World Policy Council, headed by Ambassador Horace Dawson and Senator Edward Brooke, criticized the Bush administration in the area of civil and human rights for its policy on extraordinary rendition. The council concluded in its report that extraordinary rendition

- 1) not only frustrates legitimate efforts to prosecute terrorists, but it makes a mockery of the high sounding principles that we hear invoked constantly.
- 2) robs us of the moral high ground and our justification for leadership in the world.
- 3) lowers us to the level of all those rogue and evil regimes that we have fought against in the past and against which we claim we are now struggling.

=== Investigations by national governments ===
==== France ====
The French district attorney of Bobigny opened up an instruction (an investigation) in order "to verify the presence in Le Bourget Airport, on 20 July 2005, of the plane numbered N50BH." This instruction was opened following a complaint deposed in December 2005 by the Ligue des droits de l'homme (LDH) NGO ("Human Rights League") and the International Federation of Human Rights Leagues (FIDH) NGO on charges of "arbitrary detention", "crime of torture" and "non-respect of the rights of war prisoners". It has as objective to determine if the plane was used to transport CIA prisoners to Guantanamo Bay detainment camp and if the French authorities had knowledge of this stop. However, the lawyer defending the LDH declared that he was surprised that the instruction was only opened on 20 January 2006, and that no verifications had been done before. On 2 December 2005, conservative newspaper Le Figaro had revealed the existence of two CIA planes that had landed in France, suspected of transporting CIA prisoners. But the instruction concerned only N50BH, which was a Gulfstream III, which would have landed at Le Bourget on 20 July 2005, coming from Oslo, Norway. The other aircraft is suspected to have landed in Brest on 31 March 2002. It was investigated by the Canadian authorities, as it would have been flying from St. John's, Newfoundland and Labrador in Canada, via Keflavík in Iceland before going to Turkey.

==== Germany ====
Business daily Handelsblatt reported 24 November 2005, that the CIA used an American military base in Germany to transport terrorism suspects without informing the German government. The Berliner Zeitung reported the following day there was documentation of 85 takeoffs and landings by planes with a "high probability" of being operated by the CIA, at Ramstein, the Rhein-Main Air Base and others. The newspaper cited experts and "plane-spotters" who observed the planes as responsible for the tally.

In January 2007, the German government indicted 13 alleged CIA operatives for the abduction in Macedonia, transport to Afghanistan, and torture of Khaled el-Masri, a German citizen mistakenly believed to be a terrorist. Spanish authorities identified the suspected CIA abduction team from hotel records after a stopover by their Boeing 737 in Palma de Mallorca. Names of the alleged occupants of the rendition aircraft were James Fairing, Jason Franklin, Michael Grady, Lyle Edgard Lumsden III, Eric Fain, Bryam Charles, Kirk James Bird, Walter Richard Gressbore, Patricia Rilroy, Jane Payne, James O'Hale, John Decker, and Hector Lorenzo.

Many of these names proved to be aliases. Investigations by news organizations including the Los Angeles Times, The Nation, and Der Spiegel identified James Kovalesky (alias James Richard Fairing), Harry Kirk Elarbee (alias Kirk James Bird), and Eric Robert Hume (alias Eric Matthew Fain) as pilots working for Aero Contractors, a CIA flight contractor based in Smithfield, N.C. CBS News identified Lyle Edgard Lumsden III as a US Army captain who "retired in 1992 from active duty, having served as a physician's assistant" whose last known address was "the Washington DC area".

None of the names or aliases in this case match those of the 26 alleged CIA agents prosecuted by Italy (see Abu Omar case below). However, the Los Angeles Times reported one of the pilots may have been involved in both incidents. The New York Times reported that the 13 alleged CIA operatives were charged in indictments issued in Spain and in Munich, but because of "intense political pressure from Washington" Germany never requested their extradition. In Germany, unlike Italy, defendants cannot be tried in absentia.

==== Italy ====
In the "Abu Omar case" in Italy, Hassan Mustafa Osama Nasr (aka Abu Omar), an Islamist cleric, was kidnapped in a joint CIA–SISMI operation in Milan on 17 February 2003, transferred to the Aviano Air Base, and then flown to Egypt, where he was held until 11 February 2007, when an Egyptian court ruled his imprisonment was "unfounded". He claims he was abused on the Aviano Base and endured prolonged torture in Egypt. Italian prosecutors investigated the abduction, and indicted 26 US citizens including the head of CIA in Italy, Jeffrey W. Castelli. SISMI chief General Nicolò Pollari and second-in-command Marco Mancini were forced to resign, and were also indicted. On 4 November 2009, after a trial in absentia, an Italian judge found 23 Americans (names listed here) and the two Italians guilty. The sentences ranged from five to eight years for the Americans and three years each for the Italians. The judge acquitted three American diplomats, citing diplomatic immunity, along with five Italian secret service agents, including the former chief, citing state secrecy. In 2010 an Italian appellate court confirmed most of the verdicts and increased the sentences of the 23 Americans. Among those convicted was Stephen R. Kappes, later the number two man at the CIA, Robert Seldon Lady, formerly CIA station Chief in Milan, Col. Joseph L. Romano, a U S Air Force officer, and asserted CIA agent Sabrina De Sousa, who unsuccessfully sued the US State Department to grant her diplomatic immunity and shield her from arrest.

These were the first convictions anywhere in the world arising from the CIA's practice of abducting terror suspects and transferring them to third countries where torture occurred. The US had tried but failed to obstruct the prosecutions by Italy's independent judiciary. Following the convictions the US used threats and diplomatic pressure to stop the Italian executive branch from issuing arrest warrants and extradition requests for the Americans.

==== Ireland ====
The Irish government has come under internal and external pressure to inspect airplanes at Shannon Airport to investigate whether or not they contain extraordinary rendition captives. Police at Shannon Airport said that they had received political instruction not to approach, search or otherwise interfere with US aircraft suspected of being involved in extraordinary rendition flights. Irish Justice Minister Dermot Ahern sought permission from the US for random inspection of US flights, to provide political "cover" to him in case rendition flights were revealed to have used Shannon; he believed at least three flights had done so. The European Parliament has censured Ireland for its role in facilitating extraordinary rendition and taking insufficient or no measures to uphold its obligations under the UN CAT.

==== Kosovo ====
In 2002, the Council of Europe's then-Commissioner for Human Rights Alvaro Gil-Robles witnessed "a smaller version of Guantanamo", he told France's Le Monde newspaper. Gil-Robles told the daily that he had inspected the centre, located within the US military's Camp Bondsteel in Kosovo, in 2002, to investigate reports of extrajudicial arrests by NATO-led peacekeepers.

==== Portugal ====
Portugal opened up an investigation concerning CIA flights in February 2007, on the basis of declarations by Socialist MEP Ana Gomes and by Rui Costa Pinto, journalist of Visão review. The Portuguese general prosecutor, Cândida Almeida, head of the Central Investigation and Penal Action Department (DCIAP), announced the opening of investigations on 5 February 2007. They were to be centered on the issue of "torture or inhuman and cruel treatment," and instigated by allegations of "illegal activities and serious human rights violations" made by MEP Ana Gomes to the attorney general, Pinto Monteiro, on 26 January 2007. In February 2008, the UK NGO Reprieve published a report based on flight logs obtained by Ana Gomes, confirming that over 728 prisoners were flown to Guantánamo through Portuguese airspace, and hence through Portuguese jurisdiction, in at least 28 flights.

One of the most critic voice against the scarce collaboration provided by the Portuguese government to the European Parliament Commission which investigated CIA flights, Ana Gomes declared that, although she had no doubt that permission of these illegal flights were frequent during Durão Barroso (2002–2004) and Santana Lopes (2004–2005)' governments, "during the [Socialist] government of José Sócrates [2005– ], 24 flights which passed through Portuguese territory" are registered. Active in the TDIP commission, Ana Gomes complained about the Portuguese state's reluctance to provide information, leading her to tensions with the foreign minister, Luís Amado, member of the same party. Ana Gomes declared herself satisfied with the opening of the investigations, but underlined that she had always claimed that a parliamentary inquiry would be necessary.

On the other hand, journalist Rui Costa Pinto was heard by the DCIAP, as he had written an article, refused by Visão, about flights passing by Lajes Field, a Portuguese airbase used by the US Air Forces, in the Azores.

Approximately 150 CIA flights which have flown through Portugal have been identified.

==== Romania ====
Franco Frattini the European Union Justice Commissioner requested an explanation from the governments of Poland and Romania about the accusations made by Dick Marty. Doris Mircea (Romanian spokeswoman in Brussels) replied to this in November 2007 in a letter stating "no person was kept illegally as a prisoner within Romanian jails and no illegal transfer of detainees passed through Romanian territory" and that that was the official finding of a committee of inquiry set up by the government to investigate the accusations.

==== Spain ====
In November 2005, Spanish newspaper El País reported that CIA planes had landed in the Canary Islands and in Palma de Mallorca. Spanish magistrate Baltasar Garzón, notable for his earlier attempt to prosecute Chilean dictator Augusto Pinochet, opened up an investigation concerning these landings which, according to Madrid, were made without official knowledge, thus being a breach of national sovereignty. Diplomatic cables leaked in 2010 suggest that the United States government including the American ambassador, worked with parts of the Spanish government to subvert the Spanish judicial process to control and ultimately stymie and thwart the investigation.

==== Sweden ====
Extraordinary rendition provoked a diplomatic crisis between the United States and Sweden in 2006 when Swedish authorities put a stop to CIA rendition flights. In December 2001 Swedish police detained Ahmed Agiza and Muhammad al-Zery, two Egyptians who had been seeking asylum in Sweden. The police took them to Bromma airport in Stockholm, and then stood aside as masked alleged CIA operatives cut their clothes from their bodies, inserted drugged suppositories in their anuses, and dressed them in diapers and overalls, handcuffed and chained them and put them on an executive jet with American registration N379P. They were flown to Egypt, where they were imprisoned, beaten, and tortured according to extensive investigate reports by Swedish programme Kalla fakta. A Swedish Parliamentary investigator concluded that the degrading and inhuman treatment of the two prisoners violated Swedish law. In 2006 the United Nations found Sweden had violated an international torture ban in its complicity in the CIA's transfer of al-Zari to Egypt. Sweden imposed strict rules on rendition flights, but Swedish Military Intelligence posing as airport personnel who boarded one of two subsequent extraordinary rendition flights in 2006 during a stopover at Stockholm's Arlanda International Airport found the Swedish restrictions were being ignored. In 2008 the Swedish government awarded al-Zery $500,000 in damages for the abuse he received in Sweden and the subsequent torture in Egypt.

==== United Kingdom ====
After claims by Liberty that British airports had been used by the "CIA for extraordinary rendition flights, the Association of Chief Police Officers launched an investigation in November 2005. The report was published in June 2007 and found no evidence to support the claim. This was on the same day the Council of Europe released its report with evidence that the UK had colluded in extraordinary rendition, thus directly contradicting ACPO's findings. Liberty has challenged the findings and has stated that its original claims were based on "credible evidence".

In July 2007, the British government's Intelligence and Security Committee released their Rendition report, detailing U.S. and U.K. activities and policies.

On 21 February 2008, British foreign secretary David Miliband admitted (despite previous government denials) that two U.S. extraordinary rendition flights had stopped on Diego Garcia in 2002, a U.K. territory. When questioned as to whether the government had deliberately misled the public over rendition, the Foreign Secretary apologised and stated that the government had simply "made a mistake". His statement also laid out the current UK Government view on Extraordinary rendition;

Our counter-terrorism relationship with the United States is vital to UK security. I am absolutely clear that there must and will continue to be the strongest possible intelligence and counter-terrorism relationship with the US, consistent with UK law and our international obligations. As part of our close co-operation, there has long been a regular exchange with the US authorities, in which we have set out: that we expect them to seek permission to render detainees via UK territory and airspace, including Overseas Territories; that we will grant that permission only if we are satisfied that the rendition would accord with UK law and our international obligations; and how we understand our obligations under the UN Convention Against Torture.

— David Miliband

A judicial inquiry, chaired by Sir Peter Gibson was announced by the government in July 2010, but was never formally launched and was scrapped in January 2012. According to the government, this was due to ongoing criminal investigations. In April 2012 the CIA and FBI won a court ruling in the US, exempting them from releasing documentation requested by British members of parliament. It later emerged that relevant 2002 flight records from Diego Garcia had been destroyed by water damage.

== "Erroneous rendition" ==
An article published on 5 December 2005, The Washington Post reported that the CIA's Inspector General was investigating what it calls erroneous renditions. The term appears to refer to cases in which innocent people were subjected to extraordinary rendition.

Khalid El-Masri is the most well-known person who is believed to have been subjected to the process of "extraordinary rendition", as a result of mistaken identity. Laid Saidi, an Algerian detained and tortured along with El-Masri, was apprehended apparently because of a taped telephone conversation in which the word tirat, meaning "tires" in Arabic, was mistaken for the word tairat, meaning "airplanes".

The Post's anonymous sources say that the Inspector General is looking into a number of similar cases—possibly as many as thirty innocent men who were captured and transported through what has been called "erroneous renditions".

A 27 December 2005 story quotes anonymous CIA insiders claiming there have been 10 or fewer such erroneous renditions. It names the CIA's inspector general, John Helgerson, as the official responsible for the inquiry.

The AP story quotes Tom Malinowski, Washington office director of Human Rights Watch who said:

I am glad the CIA is investigating the cases that they are aware of, but by definition you are not going to be aware of all such cases, when you have a process designed to avoid judicial safeguards.

== Obama Executive Order on rendition ==
Two days after President Barack Obama was sworn into office, on 22 January 2009, he signed an executive order entitled "Ensuring Lawful Interrogations". Overall, the executive order calls for more oversight of interrogation by third parties, but does not end extraordinary rendition. The section of the Executive Order relating to extraordinary rendition provides as follows:

- (e) Mission. The mission of the Special Task Force shall be:
  - (i) to study and evaluate whether the interrogation practices and techniques in Army Field Manual 2 22.3, when employed by departments or agencies outside the military, provide an appropriate means of acquiring the intelligence necessary to protect the Nation, and, if warranted, to recommend any additional or different guidance for other departments or agencies; and
  - (ii) to study and evaluate the practices of transferring individuals to other nations in order to ensure that such practices comply with the domestic laws, international obligations, and policies of the United States and do not result in the transfer of individuals to other nations to face torture or otherwise for the purpose, or with the effect, of undermining or circumventing the commitments or obligations of the United States to ensure the humane treatment of individuals in its custody or control.
- (f) Administration. The Special Task Force shall be established for administrative purposes within the Department of Justice and the Department of Justice shall, to the extent permitted by law and subject to the availability of appropriations, provide administrative support and funding for the Special Task Force.
- (g) Recommendations. The Special Task Force shall provide a report to the President, through the Assistant to the President for National Security Affairs and the Counsel to the President, on the matters set forth in subsection (d) within 180 days of the date of this order, unless the Chair determines that an extension is necessary.
- (h) Termination. The Chair shall terminate the Special Task Force upon the completion of its duties.

On 2 November 2009 the Second Circuit Court of Appeals ruled that victims of extraordinary rendition cannot sue Washington for torture suffered overseas, because Congress has not authorized such lawsuits, in ruling on Canadian citizen Maher Arar's case. On 15 September 2010 PolitiFact.com wrote about the Obama administration's record on renditions:

The administration has announced new procedural safeguards concerning individuals who are sent to foreign countries. President Obama also promised to shut down the CIA-run "black sites," and there seems to be anecdotal evidence that extreme renditions are not happening, at least not as much as they did during the Bush administration. Still, human rights groups say that these safeguards are inadequate and that the DOJ Task Force recommendations still allow the U.S. to send individuals to foreign countries.

== Other countries ==
=== CIA participating countries ===
According to a report by the Open Society Foundations, 54 countries participated at one point or another with the CIA's extraordinary rendition program:

1. Afghanistan
2. Albania
3. Algeria
4. Australia
5. Austria
6. Azerbaijan
7. Belgium
8. Bosnia-Herzegovina
9. Canada
10. Croatia
11. Cyprus
12. Czech Republic
13. Denmark
14. Djibouti
15. Egypt
16. Ethiopia
17. Finland
18. Gambia
19. Georgia
20. Germany
21. Greece
22. Hong Kong
23. Iceland
24. Indonesia
25. Iran
26. Ireland
27. Italy
28. Jordan
29. Kenya
30. Libya
31. Lithuania
32. Macedonia
33. Malawi
34. Malaysia
35. Mauritania
36. Morocco
37. Pakistan
38. Poland
39. Portugal
40. Romania
41. Saudi Arabia
42. Somalia
43. South Africa
44. Spain
45. Sri Lanka
46. Sweden
47. Syria
48. Thailand
49. Turkey
50. United Arab Emirates
51. United Kingdom
52. Uzbekistan
53. Yemen
54. Zimbabwe

== See also ==
- Extraterritorial jurisdiction
- Extraterritorial operation
- Long-arm jurisdiction
- Transnational repression

== Bibliography ==
- Grey, Stephen (2006). Ghost Plane: The True Story of the CIA Torture Program. New York City: St. Martin's Press. ISBN 0-312-36023-1.
- Thompson, A. C., and Trevor Paglen (2006). Torture Taxi: On the Trail of the CIA's Rendition Flights. Hoboken, New Jersey: Melville House. ISBN 1-933633-09-3.
- Paglen, Trevor (2010) Blank Spots on the Map: The Dark Geography of the Pentagon's Secret World. New York: Duton. ISBN 978-0-451-22916-8
