= Stare Kiejkuty (base) =

Military base in Stare Kiejkuty, Poland

Coordinates: 53°38′05″N 21°04′02″E

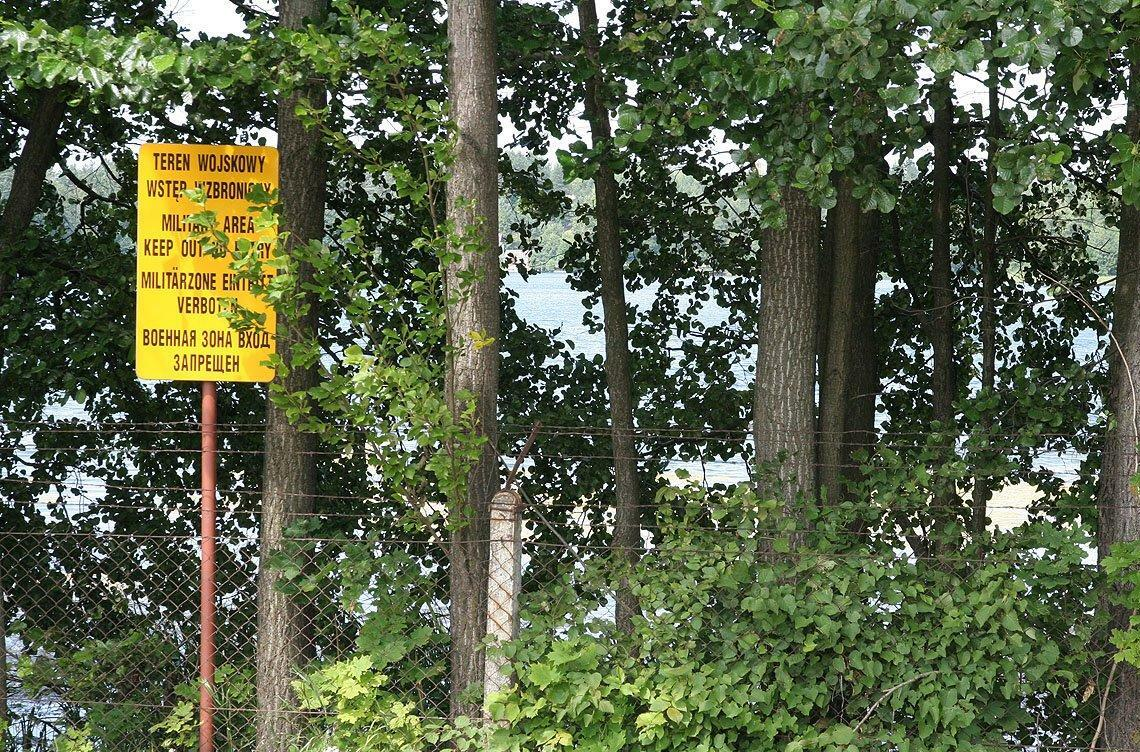
The boundaries of Stare Kiejkuty

On the territory village of Stare Kiejkuty, Poland, is a restricted military area that is the seat of (postal service name, simply) Jednostka Wojskowa 2669 (military unit 2669), Ośrodek Szkolenia Agencji Wywiadu (Intelligence Agency Training Center). Since 2005, it has attracted scrutiny as being a black site involved in the CIA's program of extraordinary rendition.

== History ==
In the nearby village of Jabłonka during Second World War there had been an outpost of the Nazi German SD (the intelligence service of the SS) and Abwehr. It was a part of Germany then, Ostpreussen. The airstrip in nearby Szymany served Luftwaffe planes in bombing raids on Warsaw. In 1968, it was used by the Soviet Army to plan operations to crush the Prague Spring, and it was later expanded into the modern Szczytno-Szymany International Airport, approximately 20 km away from Stare Kiejkuty.

After the Second World War until early ‘70 that land on the bank of Starokiejkuckie lake had been used only as a scouting camp site of the Polish Scouting Association (ZHP). Decision to establish there in Stare Kiejkuty covert Intelligence Training Center (OKKW-Ośrodek Kształcenia Kadr Wywiadu) was authorized by the communist government in the early ’70. Since then (until this day) officially it exists as Jednostka Wojskowa 2669 (JW 2669).

It had a very special status, however, having been the only intelligence training facility in the Eastern Bloc located outside the Soviet Union.

In 2002 OKKW changed its name to OSAW (Ośrodek Szkolenia Agencji Wywiadu).

On December 15, 2005, Zbigniew Siemiątkowski, the former head of the current Polish national intelligence agency, Agencja Wywiadu, confirmed that in the Stare Kiejkuty facility there are two "internal zones" to which CIA officers have access; one of these (referred to as Strefa B) is officially the home of OSAW. Other Polish intelligence officials have confirmed that American personnel associated with the facility have been known to reside in the area for several months at a time, going back five or six years.

In February 2010, Polish officials admitted that at least six CIA flights passed through Szymany airport in 2003, recanting previous denials. A United Nations report that month disclosed eight victims of the black site.

After the release of the Senate Intelligence Committee report on CIA torture in December 2014, the President of Poland between 1995 and 2005, Aleksander Kwaśniewski, admitted he had agreed to host a secret CIA black site in Poland, but that activities were to be carried out in accordance to Polish law. He said a U.S. draft memorandum had stated that "people held in Poland are to be treated as prisoners of war and will be afforded all the rights they are entitled to", but due to time constraints, the U.S. had not signed the memorandum.
