= Daum =

Daum may refer to:

== People ==
- Ahron Daum (1951–2018), Israeli-born Modern-Orthodox rabbi, educator, and author
- Andreas Daum (active from 1995), German-American historian
- Auguste Daum (1853–1909), French ceramist
- Christoph Daum (1953–2024), German football coach
- Gerhard Daum (born 1956), German composer
- Kevin Daum, author, columnist, entrepreneurship coach, marketer and speaker
- Léon Daum (1887–1966), French mining engineer
- Margaret Daum (1906–1977), American classical soprano
- Meghan Daum (born 1970), American author, essayist, and journalist
- Menachem Daum, Orthodox Jewish documentary film-maker
- Mike Daum (born 1995), American college basketball player for South Dakota State University
- Norbert Daum (born 1948), Austrian musician and conductor
- Paulus Adrianus Daum (1850–1898), Dutch author
- Rob Daum (born 1958), Canadian ice hockey coach
- Robert Daum (academic), founding Director of Iona Pacific Inter-religious Centre
- Robert Daum (politician) (1889–1962), German politician
- Werner Daum (1943–2025), German diplomat and author

== Other ==
- Daum (web portal), a South Korean web portal
- Daum (studio), a crystal studio in Nancy, France
