= Operation Infinite Reach =

1998 American strikes in Afghanistan and Sudan

- Part of the Afghan conflict and the Second Sudanese Civil War
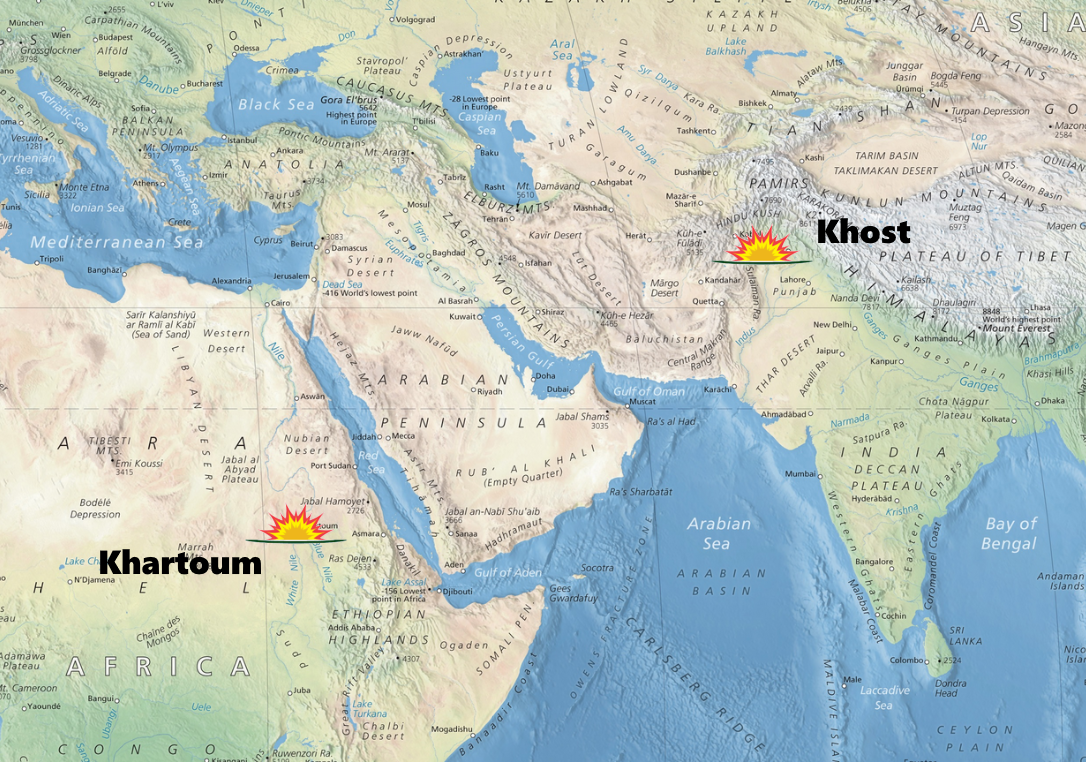
- Map showing the two sites of attacks
- Locations: Khartoum, Sudan; 15°38′45″N 32°33′42″E; Khost Province, Afghanistan
- Planned: 7–20 August 1998
- Target: Al-Shifa pharmaceutical factory and Afghan training camp
- Date: 20 August 1998; 28 years ago
- Executed by: United States Navy
- Outcome: United States failure: Strikes hit targets but failed objectives (Note: The operation is generally considered a failure: "The failure of the strikes, the 'wag the dog' slur, the intense partisanship of the period, and the nature of the al Shifa evidence likely had a cumulative effect on future decisions about the use of force against Bin Ladin" (9/11 Commission Report, p. 123).; "... The operation was essentially a failure" (Bergen 2002, p. 124).; "... The failed attack probably intensified [bin Laden's] hunger for violence" (Naftali 2006, p. 269).; "... The highly unsuccessful Operation Infinite Reach ... backfired and acted as a recruitment drive for bin Laden's Al Qaeda" (Williams 2017, pp. 52-53).; "... The failed strikes were dubbed Operation Infinite Reach ... the missile attacks exposed the inadequacy of American intelligence and the futility of military power" (Wright 2006, p. 285).; Zenko (2010, p. 139) judges Operation Infinite Reach to be both a political and military failure.); Al-Qaeda suffers casualties and material damage, but its senior leaders survive; Al-Shifa pharmaceutical plant destroyed
- Casualties: 6–50 militants killed 1 killed, 10 injured 5 ISI officers killed (Note: This is corroborated by multiple sources: "Pakistan's pro-Taliban military intelligence service had been training Kashmiri jihadists in one of the camps hit by U.S. missiles, leading to the death of Pakistanis" (9/11 Commission Report, p. 123).; "Apparently ... Pakistani ISID officers were killed" (Clarke 2004, p. 189).; "According to Pakistani intelligence officials, the U.S. missiles hit two Pakistani-run camps" (Constable August 23, 1998).; "... Two of the targeted camps were run by Pakistani intelligence services" (Crenshaw 2003, p. 325).; "Two of the four training camps that were hit and destroyed ... were facilities of the ISI. Five ISI officers and some twenty trainees were killed" (Weaver 2010, p. 33).; "Reportedly, between twenty and sixty people at Zhawar Kili were killed, including Pakistani ISI officers training militants to fight in Kashmir" (Zenko 2010, p. 65).)

Operation Infinite Reach was the codename for American cruise missile strikes on al-Qaeda bases that were launched concurrently across two continents on 20 August 1998. Launched by the U.S. Navy, the strikes hit the al-Shifa pharmaceutical factory in Khartoum, Sudan, and a camp in Khost Province, Afghanistan, in retaliation for al-Qaeda's August 7 bombings of American embassies in Kenya and Tanzania, which killed 224 people (including 12 Americans) and injured over 4,000 others. Operation Infinite Reach was the first time the United States acknowledged a preemptive strike against a violent non-state actor.

U.S. intelligence wrongly suggested financial ties between the al-Shifa plant, which produced over half of Sudan's pharmaceuticals, and Osama bin Laden; a soil sample collected from al-Shifa allegedly contained a chemical used in VX nerve gas manufacturing. Suspecting that al-Shifa was linked to, and producing chemical weapons for, bin Laden and his al-Qaeda network, the U.S. destroyed the facility with cruise missiles, killing or wounding 11 Sudanese. The strike on al-Shifa proved controversial; after the attacks, the U.S. evidence and rationale were criticized as faulty, and academics Max Taylor and Mohamed Elbushra cite "a broad acceptance that this plant was not involved in the production of any chemical weapons." (Note: Most sources agree on the issue: "No independent evidence has emerged to corroborate the CIA's assessment" on Al-Shifa (9/11 Commission Report, p. 118).; "... The facility probably had no role whatsoever in CW development" (Barletta 1998, p. 116).; "... The strike on [Al-Shifa] was an intelligence fiasco ... The evidence suggests that the plant simply produced pharmaceuticals" (Bergen 2002, p. 126).; "... The evidence that the factory produced chemical weapons and had links to bin Laden is weak" (Reiter 2006, p. 6).; "It developed that the plant actually made only pharmaceuticals and veterinary medicines, not chemical weapons ... Bin Laden had nothing to do with the plant" (Wright 2006, p. 282).; "... Bin Laden had no ownership stake in the factory, and it was not connected to producing WMD" (Zenko August 20, 2012).)

The missile strikes on al-Qaeda's Afghan training camps were aimed at preempting more attacks and killing bin Laden. These strikes damaged the installations, but bin Laden was not present at the time. Two of the targeted camps were run by the Inter-Services Intelligence of Pakistan, which at the time was allied to the US, who were training militants to fight against Indian security forces in Jammu and Kashmir; in all, five ISI officers were confirmed killed and at least twenty militants also died. Following the attacks, Afghanistan's ruling Taliban allegedly reneged on a promise to Saudi intelligence chief Turki bin Faisal to hand over bin Laden, and the regime instead allegedly strengthened its ties with the al-Qaeda chief.

Operation Infinite Reach, the largest U.S. action in response to a terrorist attack since the 1986 bombing of Libya, was met with a mixed international response: U.S. allies and most of the American public supported the strikes, but many across the Muslim world disapproved them, viewing them as attacks specifically against Muslims, a factor that was further capitalized by radicals. The failure of the attacks to kill bin Laden also enhanced his public image in parts of the Muslim world. Further strikes were planned but not executed; as a 2002 congressional inquiry noted, Operation Infinite Reach was "the only instance ... in which the CIA or U.S. military carried out an operation directly against Bin Laden before September 11."

== Background ==
On 23 February 1998, Osama bin Laden, Ayman al-Zawahiri, and three other leaders of Islamic militant organizations issued a fatwa in the name of the World Islamic Front for Jihad Against Jews and Crusaders, publishing it in al-Quds al-Arabi. Deploring the stationing of U.S. troops in Saudi Arabia, the sanctions against Iraq, and U.S. support for Israel, they declared that "The ruling to kill the Americans and their allies—civilian and military—is an individual duty for every Muslim who can do it in any country in which it is possible to do it." In spring 1998, Saudi elites became concerned about the threat posed by al-Qaeda and bin Laden; militants attempted to infiltrate surface-to-air missiles inside the kingdom, an al-Qaeda defector alleged that Saudis were bankrolling bin Laden, and bin Laden himself lambasted the Saudi royal family. In June 1998, Al Mukhabarat Al A'amah (Saudi intelligence) director Prince Turki bin Faisal Al Saud traveled to Tarnak Farms to meet with Taliban leader Mullah Omar to discuss the question of bin Laden. Turki demanded that the Taliban either expel bin Laden from Afghanistan or hand him over to the Saudis, insisting that removing bin Laden was the price of cordial relations with the Kingdom. American analysts believed Turki offered a large amount of financial aid to resolve the dispute over bin Laden. Omar agreed to the deal, and the Saudis sent the Taliban 400 pickup trucks and funding, enabling the Taliban to retake Mazar-i-Sharif. While the Taliban sent a delegation to Saudi Arabia in July for further discussions, the negotiations stalled by August.

Around the same time, the U.S. was planning its own actions against bin Laden. Michael Scheuer, chief of the Central Intelligence Agency's bin Laden unit (Alec Station), considered using local Afghans to kidnap bin Laden, then exfiltrate him from Afghanistan in a modified Lockheed C-130 Hercules. Documents recovered from Wadih el-Hage's Nairobi computer suggested a link between bin Laden and the deaths of U.S. troops in Somalia. These were used as the foundation for the June 1998 New York indictment of bin Laden, although the charges were later dropped. The planned raid was cancelled in May after internecine disputes between officials at the FBI and the CIA; the hesitation of the National Security Council (NSC) to approve the plan; concerns over the raid's chance of success, and the potential for civilian casualties.

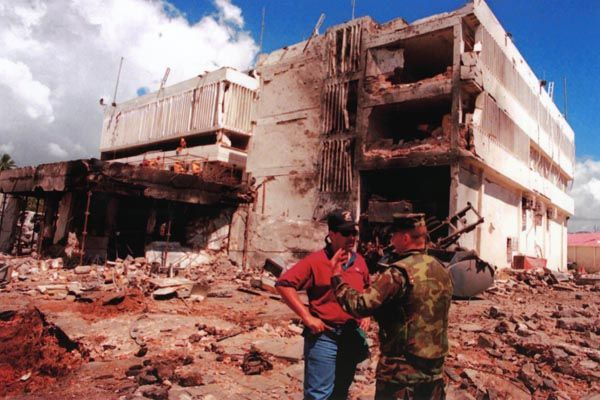
The U.S. Embassy in Dar es Salaam, Tanzania, after the August 7, 1998, al-Qaeda bombing

Al-Qaeda had begun reconnoitering Nairobi for potential targets in December 1993, using a team led by Ali Mohamed. In January 1994, bin Laden was personally presented with the team's surveillance reports, and he and his senior advisers began to develop a plan to attack the American embassy there. From February to June 1998, al-Qaeda prepared to launch their attacks, renting residences, building their bombs, and acquiring trucks; meanwhile, bin Laden continued his public-relations efforts, giving interviews with ABC News and Pakistani journalists. While U.S. authorities had investigated al-Qaeda activities in Nairobi, they had not detected any warnings of imminent attacks.

On August 7, 1998, al-Qaeda teams in Nairobi, Kenya, and Dar es Salaam, Tanzania, attacked the cities' U.S. embassies simultaneously with truck bombs. In Nairobi, the explosion collapsed the nearby Ufundi Building and destroyed the embassy, killing 213 people, including 12 Americans; another 4,000 people were wounded. In Dar es Salaam, the bomber was unable to get close enough to the embassy to demolish it, but the blast killed 11 Africans and wounded 85. Bin Laden justified the high-casualty attacks, the largest against the U.S. since the 1983 Beirut barracks bombings, by claiming they were in retaliation for the deployment of U.S. troops in Somalia; he also alleged that the embassies had devised the Rwandan genocide as well as a supposed plan to partition Sudan.

== Execution ==
=== Planning the strikes ===
National Security Advisor Sandy Berger called President Bill Clinton at 5:35 AM on August 7 to notify him of the bombings. That day, Clinton started meeting with his "Small Group" of national security advisers, which included Berger, CIA director George Tenet, Secretary of State Madeleine Albright, Attorney General Janet Reno, (Note: While Coll (2005, p. 406) writes that Reno was present in the Small Group, Barletta (1998, p. 116) does not. Zill substitutes Clarke for Reno.) Defense Secretary William Cohen, and Chairman of the Joint Chiefs of Staff Hugh Shelton. The group's objective was to plan a military response to the East Africa embassy bombings. Initially the U.S. suspected either Hamas or Hezbollah for the bombings, but FBI Agents John P. O'Neill and Ali Soufan demonstrated that al-Qaeda was responsible. Based on electronic and phone intercepts, physical evidence from Nairobi, and interrogations, officials soon demonstrated bin Laden as the perpetrator of the attacks. On August 8, the White House asked the CIA and the Joint Chiefs of Staff to prepare a targets list; the initial list included twenty targets in Sudan, Afghanistan, and an unknown third country, (Note: According to Zenko (2010, p. 60), the third state was Yemen.) although it was narrowed down on August 12.

In an August 10 Small Group meeting, the principals agreed to use Tomahawk cruise missiles, rather than troops or aircraft, in the retaliatory strikes. Cruise missiles had been previously used against Iraq as reprisal for the 1993 attempted assassination of then-President George H. W. Bush. Using cruise missiles also helped to preserve secrecy; airstrikes would have required more preparation that might have leaked to the media and alerted bin Laden. The option of using commandos was discarded, as it required too much time to prepare forces, logistics, and combat search and rescue. Using helicopters or bombers would have been difficult due to the lack of a suitable base or Pakistani permission to cross its airspace, and the administration also feared a recurrence of the disastrous 1980 Operation Eagle Claw in Iran. While military officials suggested bombing Kandahar, which bin Laden and his associates often visited, the administration was concerned about killing civilians and hurting the U.S.' image.

On August 11, General Anthony Zinni of Central Command was instructed to plan attacks on bin Laden's Khost camps, where CIA intelligence indicated bin Laden and other militants would be meeting on August 20, purportedly to plan further attacks against the U.S. Clinton was informed of the plan on August 12 and 14. Participants in the meeting later disagreed whether or not the intelligence indicated bin Laden would attend the meeting; however, an objective of the attack remained to kill the al-Qaeda leader, and the NSC encouraged the strike regardless of whether bin Laden and his companions were known to be present at Khost. The administration aimed to prevent future al-Qaeda attacks discussed in intercepted communications. As Berger later testified, the operation also sought to damage bin Laden's infrastructure and show the administration's commitment to combating bin Laden. The Khost complex, which was 90 miles (140 km) southeast of Kabul, also had ideological significance: Bin Laden had fought nearby during the Soviet–Afghan War, and he had given interviews and even held a press conference at the site. Felix Sater, then a CIA source, provided additional intelligence on the camps' locations.

On August 14, Tenet told the Small Group that bin Laden and al-Qaeda were doubtless responsible for the attack; Tenet called the intelligence a "slam dunk", according to counterterrorism official Richard Clarke, and Clinton approved the attacks the same day. As the 9/11 Commission Report relates, the group debated "whether to strike targets outside of Afghanistan". Tenet briefed the small group again on August 17 regarding possible targets in Afghanistan and Sudan; on August 19, the al-Shifa pharmaceutical facility in Khartoum, Sudan, al-Qaeda's Afghan camps, and a Sudanese tannery were designated as targets. The aim of striking the tannery, which had allegedly been given to bin Laden by the Sudanese for his road-building work, was to disrupt bin Laden's finances, but it was removed as a target due to fears of inflicting civilian casualties without any loss for bin Laden. Clinton gave the final approval for the attacks at 3:00 AM on August 20; the same day, he also signed Executive Order 13099, authorizing sanctions on bin Laden and al-Qaeda. The Clinton administration justified Operation Infinite Reach under Article 51 of the UN Charter and Title 22, Section 2377 of the U.S. Code; the former guarantees a UN member state's right to self-defense, while the latter authorizes presidential action by "all necessary means" to target international terrorist infrastructure. Government lawyers asserted that since the missile strikes were an act of self-defense and not directed at an individual, they were not forbidden as an assassination. A review by administration lawyers concluded that the attack would be legal, since the president has the authority to attack the infrastructure of anti-American terrorist groups, and al-Qaeda's infrastructure was largely human. Officials also interpreted "infrastructure" to include al-Qaeda's leadership.

The missiles would pass into Pakistani airspace, overflying "a suspected Pakistani nuclear weapons site," according to Vice Chairman of the Joint Chiefs of Staff General Joseph Ralston; U.S. officials feared Pakistan would mistake them for an Indian nuclear attack. Clarke was concerned the Pakistanis would shoot down the cruise missiles or airplanes if they were not notified, but also feared the ISI would warn the Taliban or al-Qaeda if they were alerted. In Islamabad on the evening of August 20, Ralston informed Pakistan Army Chief of Staff Jehangir Karamat of the incoming American strikes ten minutes before the missiles entered Pakistani airspace. Clarke also worried the Pakistanis would notice the U.S. Navy ships, but was told that submerged submarines would launch the missiles. However, the Pakistan Navy detected the destroyers and informed the government.

=== Al-Shifa plant attack ===
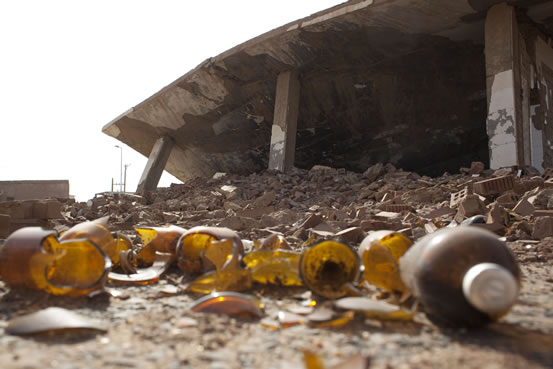
The remains of the destroyed Al-Shifa facility

At about 7:30 PM Khartoum time (17:30 GMT), two American warships in the Red Sea (USS Briscoe and USS Hayler) fired thirteen Tomahawk missiles at Sudan's Al-Shifa pharmaceutical factory, which the U.S. wrongly claimed was helping bin Laden build chemical weapons. The entire factory was destroyed except for the administration, water-cooling, and plant laboratory sections, which were severely damaged. One night watchman was killed and ten other Sudanese were wounded by the strike. Worried about the possibility for hazardous chemical leakages, analysts ran computer simulations on wind patterns, climate, and chemical data, which indicated a low risk of collateral damage. Regardless, planners added more cruise missiles to the strike on Al-Shifa, aiming to completely destroy the plant and any dangerous substances.

Clarke stated that intelligence linked bin Laden to Al-Shifa's current and past operators, namely Iraqi nerve gas experts such as Emad al-Ani and Sudan's ruling National Islamic Front. Since 1995, the CIA had received intelligence suggesting collaboration between Sudan and bin Laden to produce chemical weapons for attacking U.S. Armed Forces personnel based in Saudi Arabia. Since 1989, the Sudanese opposition and Uganda had alleged that the regime was manufacturing and using chemical weapons, although the U.S. did not accuse Sudan of chemical weapons proliferation. Al-Qaeda defector Jamal al-Fadl had also spoken of bin Laden's desire to obtain weapons of mass destruction, and an August 4 CIA intelligence report suggested bin Laden "had already acquired chemical weapons and might be ready to attack". Cohen later testified that physical evidence, technical and human intelligence, and the site's security and purported links to bin Laden backed the intelligence community's view that the Al-Shifa plant was producing chemical weapons and associated with terrorists.

With the help of an Egyptian agent, the CIA had obtained a sample of soil from the facility taken in December 1997 (Note: Barletta 1998 (p. 125) states that the sample was taken in June 1998.) showing the presence of O-Ethyl methylphosphonothioic acid (EMPTA), a substance used in the production of VX nerve gas, at 2.5 times trace levels. (Reports are contradictory on whether the soil was obtained from within the compound itself, or outside.) The collected soil was split into three samples, which were then analyzed by a private laboratory. The agent's bona fides were later confirmed through polygraph testing; however, the CIA produced a report on Al-Shifa on July 24, 1998, questioning whether Al-Shifa produced chemical weapons or simply stored precursors, and the agency advised collecting more soil samples. Cohen and Tenet later briefed U.S. senators on intercepted telephone communications from the plant that reputedly bolstered the U.S. case against Al-Shifa. U.S. intelligence also purportedly researched the Al-Shifa factory online and searched commercial databases, but did not find any medicines for sale.

=== Al-Shifa controversy ===
U.S. officials later acknowledged that the evidence cited by the U.S. in its rationale for the Al-Shifa strike was weaker than initially believed: The facility had not been involved in chemical weapons production, and was not connected to bin Laden. The $30 million Al-Shifa factory, which had a $199,000 contract with the UN under the Oil-for-Food Programme, employed 300 Sudanese and provided over half of the country's pharmaceuticals, including medicines for malaria, diabetes, gonorrhea, and tuberculosis. A Sudanese named Salah Idris purchased the plant in March 1998; while the CIA later said it found financial ties between Idris and the bin Laden-linked terrorist group Egyptian Islamic Jihad, the agency had been unaware at the time that Idris owned the Al-Shifa facility. Idris later denied any links to bin Laden and sued to recover $24 million in funds frozen by the U.S., as well as for the damage to his factory. Idris hired investigations firm Kroll Inc., which reported in February 1999 that neither Idris nor Al-Shifa was connected to terrorism.

The chairman of Al-Shifa Pharmaceutical Industries insisted that his factory did not make nerve gas, and Sudanese president Omar al-Bashir formed a commission to investigate the factory. Sudan invited the U.S. to conduct chemical tests at the site for evidence to support its claim that the plant might have been a chemical weapons factory; the U.S. refused the invitation to investigate and did not officially apologize for the attacks. Press coverage indicated that Al-Shifa was not a secure, restricted-access factory, as the U.S. alleged, and American officials later conceded that Al-Shifa manufactured pharmaceutical drugs. Sudan requested a UN investigation of the Al-Shifa plant to verify or disprove the allegations of weapons production; while the proposal was backed by several international organizations, it was opposed by the U.S.

The American Bureau of Intelligence and Research (INR) criticized the CIA's intelligence on Al-Shifa and bin Laden in an August 6 memo; as James Risen reported, INR analysts concluded that "the evidence linking Al Shifa to bin Laden and chemical weapons was weak." According to Risen, some dissenting officials doubted the basis for the strike, but senior principals believed that "the risks of hitting the wrong target were far outweighed by the possibility that the plant was making chemical weapons for a terrorist eager to use them." Senior NSC intelligence official Mary McCarthy had stated that better intelligence was needed before planning a strike, while Reno, concerned about the lack of conclusive evidence, had pressed for delaying the strikes until the U.S. obtained better intelligence. According to CIA officer Paul R. Pillar, senior Agency officials met with Tenet before he briefed the White House on bin Laden and Al-Shifa, and the majority of them opposed attacking the plant. Barletta notes that "It is unclear precisely when U.S. officials decided to destroy the Shifa plant." ABC News reported that Al-Shifa was designated as a target just hours in advance; Newsweek stated that the plant was targeted on August 15–16; U.S. officials asserted that the plant was added as a target months in advance; and a U.S. News & World Report article contended that Al-Shifa had been considered as a target for years. Clinton ordered an investigation into the evidence used to justify the Al-Shifa strike, while as of July 1999, the House and Senate intelligence committees were also investigating the target-selection process, the evidence cited, and whether intelligence officials recommended attacking the plant.

It was later hypothesized that the EMPTA detected was the result of the breakdown of a pesticide or confused with Fonofos, a structurally similar insecticide used in African agriculture. Eric Croddy contends that the sample did not contain Fonofos, arguing that Fonofos has a distinct ethyl group and a benzene group, which distinguish it from EMPTA, and that the two chemicals could not be easily confused. Tests conducted in October 1999 by Idris' defense team found no trace of EMPTA. Although Tenet vouched for the Egyptian agent's truthfulness, Barletta questions the operative's bona fides, arguing that they may have misled U.S. intelligence; he also notes that the U.S. withdrew its intelligence staff from Sudan in 1996 and later retracted 100 intelligence reports from a fraudulent Sudanese source. Ultimately, Barletta concludes that "It remains possible that Al-Shifa Pharmaceutical Factory may have been involved in some way in producing or storing the chemical compound EMPTA ... On balance, the evidence available to date indicates that it is more probable that the Shifa plant had no role whatsoever in CW production."

=== Attack on Afghan camps ===
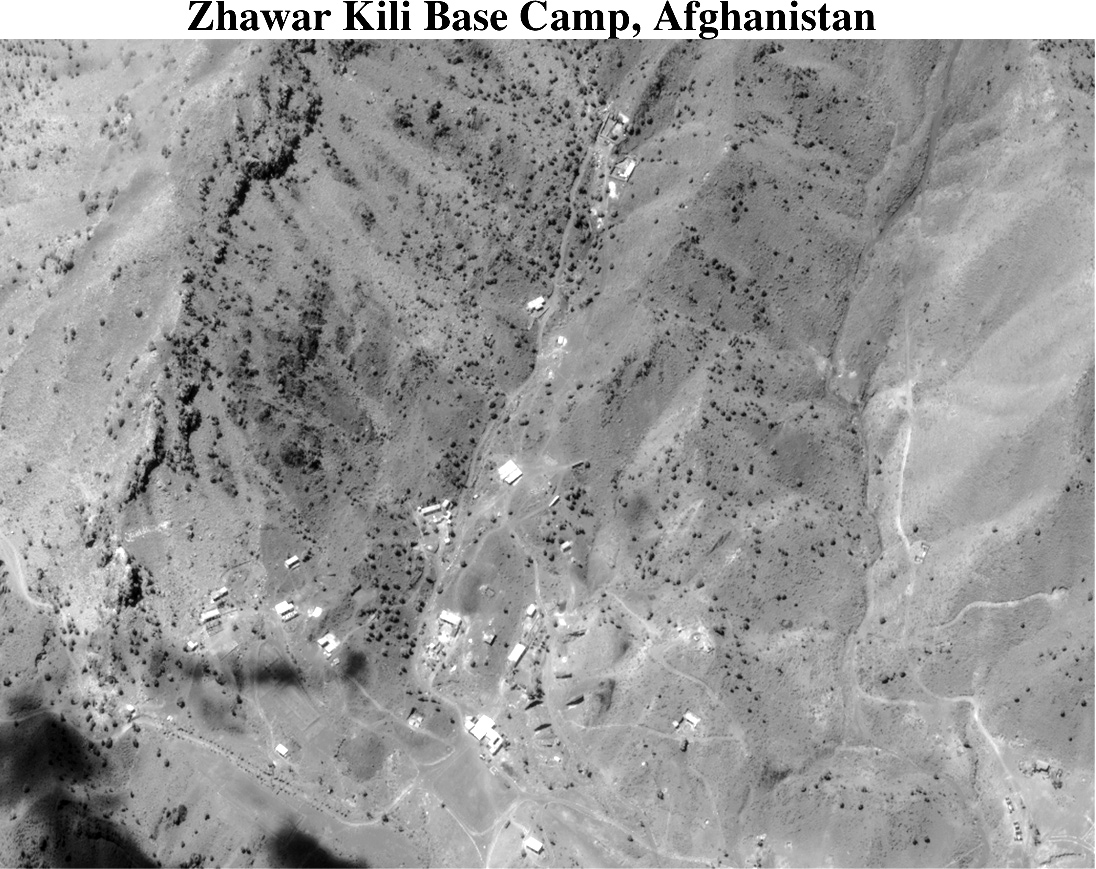
A U.S. satellite photo of the Zhawar Kili Al-Badr Base Camp

Four U.S. Navy ships and the submarine USS Columbia, (Note: The four ships were USS Cowpens, USS Shiloh, USS Elliot, and USS Milius (Naval History and Heritage Command Communication & Outreach Division Summer 2017).) stationed in the Arabian Sea, fired between 60 and 75 (Note: Accounts differ as to how many cruise missiles were fired at the Afghan training camps. John Barry and Russell Watson, "'Our Target Was Terror'," Newsweek, August 30, 1998, and Weaver (2010, pp. 32-33) say 60; Wright (2006, p. 283), Zenko (2010, p. 64), and Woodward and Ricks (October 3, 2001) give a number of 66; Crenshaw (2003, p. 325) writes that 60–70 missiles were launched; Coll (2005, p. 411) and Clarke (2004, p. 188) cite a figure of 75 cruise missiles fired.) Tomahawk cruise missiles into Afghanistan at the Zhawar Kili Al-Badr camp complex in the Khost region, which included a base camp, a support camp, and four training camps. Peter Bergen identifies the targeted camps, located in Afghanistan's "Pashtun belt," as al-Badr 1 and 2, al-Farooq, Khalid bin Walid, Abu Jindal, and Salman Farsi; other sources identify the Muawia, Jihad Wahl, and Harkat-ul-Jihad al-Islami camps as targets. According to Shelton, the base camp housed "storage, housing, training and administration facilities for the complex," while the support camp included weapons-storage facilities and managed the site's logistics. Egyptian Islamic Jihad and the Algerian Armed Islamic Group also used the Khost camps, as well as Pakistani militant groups fighting an insurgency in Kashmir, such as Harkat Ansar, Lashkar-e-Taiba, and Hizbul Mujahideen. The rudimentary camps, reputedly run by Taliban official Jalaluddin Haqqani, were frequented by Arab, Chechen, and Central Asian militants, as well as the ISI. The missiles hit at roughly 10:00 PM Khost time (17:30 GMT); as in Sudan, the strikes were launched at night to avoid collateral damage. In contrast to the attack on Al-Shifa, the strike on the Afghan camps was uncontroversial.

The U.S. first fired unitary (C-model) Tomahawks at the Khost camps, aiming to attract militants into the open, then launched a barrage of D-model missiles equipped with submunitions to maximize casualties. Sources differ on the precise number of casualties inflicted by the missile strikes. Bin Laden bodyguard Abu Jandal and militant trainee Abdul Rahman Khadr later estimated that only six men had been killed in the strikes. The Taliban claimed 22 Afghans killed and over 50 seriously injured, while Berger put al-Qaeda casualties at between 20 and 30 men. Bin Laden jokingly told militants that only a few camels and chickens had died, although his spokesman cited losses of six Arabs killed and five wounded, seven Pakistanis killed and over 15 wounded, and 15 Afghans killed. A declassified September 9, 1998, State Department cable stated that around 20 Pakistanis and 15 Arabs died, out of a total of over 50 killed in the attack. Harkat-ul-Mujahideen's leader, Fazlur Rehman Khalil, initially claimed a death toll of over 50 militants, but later said that he had lost fewer than ten fighters. Death toll ranges from 6 or 50 militants.

Pakistani and hospital sources gave a death toll of eleven dead and fifty-three wounded. Pakistani journalist Ahmed Rashid writes that 20 Afghans, seven Pakistanis, three Yemenis, two Egyptians, one Saudi and one Turk were killed. Initial reports by Pakistani intelligence chief Chaudhry Manzoor and a Foreign Ministry spokesman stated that a missile had landed in Pakistan and killed six Pakistanis; the government later retracted the statement and fired Manzoor for the incorrect report. However, the 9/11 Commission Report states that Clinton later called Pakistani prime minister Nawaz Sharif "to apologize for a wayward missile that had killed several people in a Pakistani village." One 1998 U.S. News & World Report article suggested that most of the strike's victims were Pakistani militants bound for the Kashmiri insurgency, rather than al-Qaeda members; the operation killed a number of ISI officers present in the camps. A 1999 press report stated that seven Harkat Ansar militants were killed and 24 were wounded, while eight Lashkar-e-Taiba and Hizbul Mujahideen members were killed. In a May 1999 meeting with American diplomats, Haqqani said his facilities had been destroyed and 25 of his men killed in the operation.

Following the attack, U.S. surveillance aircraft and reconnaissance satellites photographed the sites for damage assessment, although clouds obscured the area. According to The Washington Post, the imagery indicated "considerable damage" to the camps, although "up to 20 percent of the missiles ... [had] disappointing results." Meanwhile, bin Laden made calls by satellite phone, attempting to ascertain the damage and casualties the camps had sustained. One anonymous official reported that some buildings were destroyed, while others suffered heavy or light damage or were unscathed. Abu Jandal stated that bathrooms, the kitchen, and the mosque were hit in the strike, but the camps were not completely destroyed. Berger claimed that the damage to the camps was "moderate to severe," while CIA agent Henry A. Crumpton later wrote that al-Qaeda "suffered a few casualties and some damaged infrastructure, but no more." Since the camps were relatively unsophisticated, they were quickly and easily rebuilt within two weeks.

ISI director Hamid Gul reportedly notified the Taliban of the missile strikes in advance; bin Laden, who survived the strikes, later claimed that he had been informed of them by Pakistanis. A bin Laden spokesman claimed that bin Laden and the Taliban had prepared for the strike after hearing of the evacuation of Americans from Pakistan. Other U.S. officials reject the tip-off theory, citing a lack of evidence and ISI casualties in the strike; Tenet later wrote in his memoirs that the CIA could not ascertain whether Bin Laden had been warned in advance. Steve Coll reports that the CIA heard after the attack that bin Laden had been at Zhawar Kili Al-Badr but had left some hours before the missiles hit. Bill Gertz writes that the earlier arrest of Mohammed Odeh on August 7, while he was traveling to meet with bin Laden, alerted bin Laden, who canceled the meeting; this meant the camps targeted by the cruise missiles were mainly empty the day of the U.S. strike. Lawrence Wright says the CIA intercepted a phone call indicating that bin Laden would be in Khost, but the al-Qaeda chief instead decided to go to Kabul. Other media reports indicate that the strike was delayed to maximize secrecy, thus missing bin Laden. Scheuer charges that while the U.S. had planned to target the complex's mosque during evening prayers to kill bin Laden and his associates, the White House allegedly delayed the strikes "to avoid offending the Muslim world". Simon Reeve states that Pakistani intelligence had informed bin Laden that the U.S. was using his phone to track him, so he turned it off and cancelled the meeting at Khost.

== Aftermath ==
=== Reactions in the U.S. ===
Clinton's television address announcing Operation Infinite Reach

Clinton flew back to Washington, D.C. from his vacation at Martha's Vineyard, speaking with legislators from Air Force One and British prime minister Tony Blair, Egyptian president Hosni Mubarak, and Sharif from the White House. Clinton announced the attacks in a TV address, saying the Khost camp was "one of the most active terrorist bases in the world." He emphasized: "Our battle against terrorism ... will require strength, courage and endurance. We will not yield to this threat ... We must be prepared to do all that we can for as long as we must." Clinton also cited "compelling evidence that [bin Laden] was planning to mount further attacks" in his rationale for Operation Infinite Reach.

The missiles were launched three days after Clinton testified on the Clinton–Lewinsky scandal, and some countries, media outlets, protesters, and Republicans accused him of ordering the attacks as a diversion. The attacks also drew parallels to the then-recently released film Wag the Dog, which features a fictional president faking a war in Albania to distract attention from a sex scandal. Administration officials denied any connection between the missile strikes and the ongoing scandal, and 9/11 Commission investigators found no reason to dispute those statements.

Pollster	Support strikes	Oppose strikes	A legitimate response	Influenced by scandal/ A distraction
USA Today/CNN/Gallup	66%	19%	58%	36%
Los Angeles Times	75%	16%	59%	38%
ABC News	80%	14%	64%	30%

Operation Infinite Reach was covered heavily by U.S. media: About 75% of Americans knew about the strikes by the evening of August 20. The next day, 79% of respondents in a Pew Research Center poll reported they had "followed the story 'very' or 'fairly' closely." The week after the strikes, the evening programs of the three major news networks featured 69 stories on them. In a Newsweek poll, up to 40% thought that diverting attention from the Lewinsky scandal was one objective of the strikes; according to a Star Tribune poll, 31% of college-educated respondents and 60% of those "with less than a 12th grade education" believed that the attacks were motivated "a great deal" by the scandal. A USA Today/CNN/Gallup poll of 628 Americans showed that 47% thought it would increase terrorist attacks, while 38% thought it would lessen terrorism. A Los Angeles Times poll of 895 taken three days after the attack indicated that 84% believed that the operation would trigger a retaliatory terrorist attack on U.S. soil.

=== International reactions ===
While U.S. allies such as Australia, Germany, the United Kingdom, Israel, and the Northern Alliance supported the attacks, they were opposed by Cuba, Russia, and China, as well as the targeted nations and other Muslim countries. German chancellor Helmut Kohl said that "resolute actions by all countries" were required against terrorism, while Russian president Boris Yeltsin condemned "the ineffective approach to resolving disputes without trying all forms of negotiation and diplomacy." The Taliban denounced the operation, denied charges it provided a safe haven for bin Laden, and insisted the U.S. attack killed only innocent civilians. Mullah Omar condemned the strikes and announced that Afghanistan "will never hand over bin Laden to anyone and (will) protect him with our blood at all costs." A mob in Jalalabad burned and looted the local UN office, while an Italian UN official was killed in Kabul on August 21, allegedly in response to the strikes. Thousands of anti-U.S. protesters took to the streets of Khartoum. Omar al-Bashir led an anti-U.S. rally and warned of possible reciprocation, and Martha Crenshaw notes that the strike "gained the regime some sympathy in the Arab world." The Sudanese government expelled the British ambassador for Britain's support of the attacks, while protesters stormed the empty U.S. embassy. Sudan also reportedly allowed two suspected accomplices to the embassy bombings to escape. Libyan leader Muammar al-Gaddafi declared his country's support for Sudan and led an anti-U.S. rally in Tripoli. Zawahiri later equated the destruction of Al-Shifa with the September 11 attacks.

Pakistan condemned the U.S. missile strikes as a violation of the territorial integrity of two Islamic countries, and criticized the U.S. for allegedly violating Pakistani airspace. Pakistanis protested the strikes in large demonstrations, including a 300-strong rally in Islamabad, where protesters burned a U.S. flag outside the U.S. Information Service center; in Karachi, thousands burned effigies of Clinton. The Pakistani government was enraged by the ISI and trainee casualties, the damage to ISI training camps, the short notice provided by the U.S., and the Americans' failure to inform Sharif of the strikes. Iran's Supreme Leader, Ali Khamenei, and Iraq denounced the strikes as terrorism, while Iraq also denied producing chemical weapons in Sudan. The Arab League, holding an emergency meeting in Cairo, unanimously demanded an independent investigation into the Al-Shifa facility; the League also condemned the attack on the plant as a violation of Sudanese sovereignty.

Several Islamist groups also condemned Operation Infinite Reach, and some of them threatened retaliation. Hamas founder Ahmed Yassin stated that American attacks against Muslim countries constituted an attack on Islam itself, accusing the U.S. of state terrorism. Mustafa Mashhur, the leader of the Muslim Brotherhood, said that U.S. military action would inflame public opinion against America and foster regional unrest, which was echoed by a Hezbollah spokesman. Harkat-ul-Mujahideen threatened Americans and Jews, announcing a worldwide jihad against the U.S. Al-Gama'a al-Islamiyya denounced the strikes as "a crime which will not go without punishment" and encouraged fellow militant groups to reciprocate. In November, Lashkar-e-Taiba held a 3-day demonstration in Lahore to support bin Laden, in which 50,000 Pakistanis promised vengeance for the strikes. American embassies and facilities worldwide also received a high volume of threats following the attacks. The attacks led to anti-Semitic conspiracy theories in the region that Lewinsky was a Jewish agent influencing Clinton against aiding Palestine, which would influence Mohamed Atta to join al-Qaeda's Hamburg cell and commit the September 11 attacks.

==== Planet Hollywood bombing ====
A Planet Hollywood restaurant in Cape Town, South Africa, was the target of a terrorist bombing on August 25, killing two and injuring 26. The perpetrators, Muslims Against Global Oppression (later known as People Against Gangsterism and Drugs), stated that it was in retaliation for Operation Infinite Reach.

=== Al-Qaeda victory ===
[Bin Laden] had been shot at by a high-tech superpower and the superpower missed ... The missile strikes were his biggest publicity payoff to date.

— Steve Coll

The outcome was considered a political and strategic victory for al-Qaeda. The Taliban announced within a day that bin Laden had survived the attacks, which Wright notes strengthened his image in the Muslim world "as a symbolic figure of resistance" to the U.S. Bin Laden had prominent support in Pakistan, where two hagiographies of the al-Qaeda chief were soon published, parents began naming their newborn sons Osama, mosques distributed his taped speeches, and cargo trucks bore the slogan "Long Live Osama". Children in Kenya and Tanzania wore bin Laden T-shirts, and al-Qaeda sold propaganda videos of the strikes' damage in European and Middle Eastern Islamic bookstores. A 1999 report prepared by Sandia National Laboratories stated that bin Laden "appeared to many as an underdog standing firm in the face of bullying aggression," adding that the missile strikes sparked further planning of attacks by extremists. Operation Infinite Reach also strengthened bin Laden's associates' support for him, and helped the al-Qaeda leader consolidate support among other Islamist militant groups. The attacks also helped al-Qaeda recruit new members and solicit funds. Naftali concludes that the strikes damaged the Khost camps but failed to deter al-Qaeda and "probably intensified [bin Laden's] hunger for violence." Similarly, researcher Rohan Gunaratna told the 9/11 Commission that the attacks did not reduce the threat of al-Qaeda.

== Assessment ==
Each cruise missile cost between $750,000 and $1 million, and nearly $750,000,000 in weapons was fired in the strikes overall. The missiles' failure to eliminate their targets led to an acceleration in the American program to develop unmanned combat air vehicles. On September 2, the Taliban announced that it had found an unexploded U.S. missile, and the Pakistani press claimed that another had landed in Balochistan's Kharan Desert. Russian intelligence and intercepted al-Qaeda communications indicate that China sent officials to Khost to examine and buy some of the unexploded missiles; bin Laden used the over $10 million in proceeds to fund Chechen opposition forces. Pakistani missile scientists studied the recovered Tomahawk's computer, GPS, and propulsion systems, and Wright contends that Pakistan "may have used [the Tomahawks] ... to design its own version of a cruise missile." This would emerge as the Babur cruise missile.

The September 9 State Department cable also claimed that "the U.S. strikes have flushed the Arab and Pakistani militants out of Khost," and while the camps were relocated near Kandahar and Kabul, paranoia lingered as al-Qaeda suspected that a traitor had facilitated the attacks. For example, Abu Jandal claimed that the U.S. had employed an Afghan cook to pinpoint bin Laden's location. Bin Laden augmented his personal bodyguard and began changing where he slept, while Al-Qaeda military chief Mohammed Atef frisked journalists who sought to meet Bin Laden.

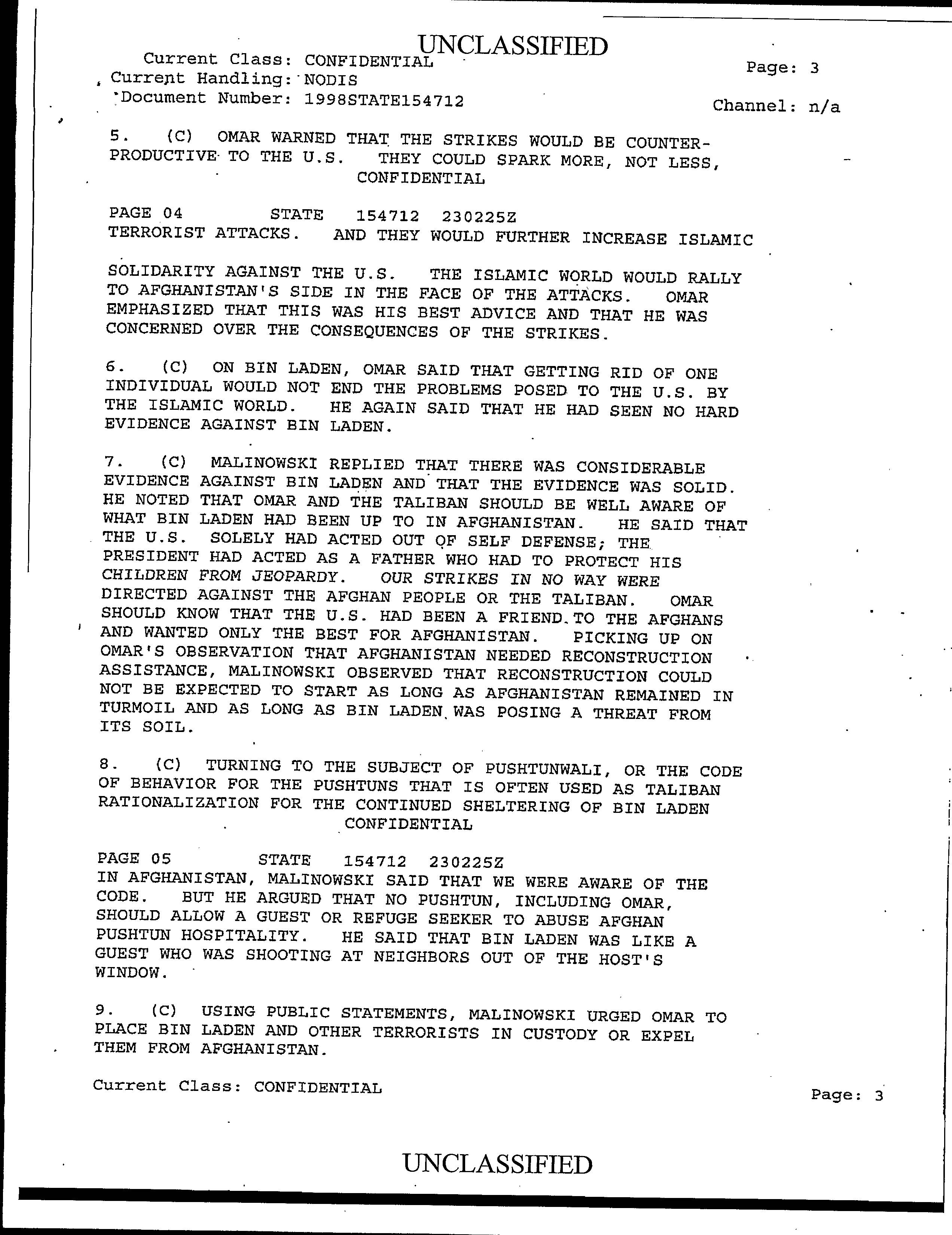
Excerpt from Mullah Omar's August 22, 1998, phone call with a U.S. diplomat

Two days after Operation Infinite Reach, Omar reportedly called the State Department, saying that the strikes would only lead to more anti-Americanism and terrorism, and that Clinton should resign. The embassy bombings and the declaration of war against the U.S. had divided the Taliban and angered Omar. However, bin Laden swore an oath of fealty to the Taliban leader, and the two became friends. According to Wright, Omar also believed that turning over bin Laden would weaken his position. In an October cable, the State Department also wrote that the missile strikes worsened Afghan-U.S. relations while bringing the Taliban and al-Qaeda closer together. A Taliban spokesman even told State Department officials in November that "If [the Taliban] could have retaliated with similar strikes against Washington, it would have." The Taliban also denied American charges that bin Laden was responsible for the embassy bombings. When Turki visited Omar to retrieve bin Laden, Omar told the prince that they had miscommunicated and he had never agreed to give the Saudis bin Laden. In Turki's account, Omar lambasted him when he protested, insulting the Saudi royal family and praising the Al-Qaeda leader; Turki left without bin Laden. The Saudis broke off relations with the Taliban and allegedly hired a young Uzbek named Siddiq Ahmed in a failed bid to assassinate bin Laden. American diplomatic engagement with the Taliban continued, and the State Department insisted to them that the U.S. was only opposed to bin Laden and al-Qaeda, at whom the missile strikes were aimed, not Afghanistan and its leadership.

Following the strikes, Osama bin Laden's spokesman announced that "The battle has not started yet. Our answer will be deeds, not words." Zawahiri made a phone call to reporter Rahimullah Yusufzai, stating that "We survived the attack ... we aren't afraid of bombardment, threats, and acts of aggression ... we are ready for more sacrifices. The war has only just begun; the Americans should now await the answer." Al-Qaeda attempted to recruit chemists to develop a more addictive type of heroin for export to the U.S. and Western Europe, but was unsuccessful. A September 1998 intelligence report was titled "UBL Plans for Reprisals Against U.S. Targets, Possibly in U.S.," while the August 6, 2001, President's Daily Brief stated that after Operation Infinite Reach, "Bin Ladin told followers he wanted to retaliate in Washington."

Afterwards, the U.S. considered but did not execute more cruise missile strikes; from 1999 to 2001, ships and submarines in the North Arabian Sea were prepared to conduct further attacks against bin Laden if his location could be ascertained. The U.S. considered firing more cruise missiles against bin Laden in Kandahar in December 1998 and May 1999; at an Emirati hunting camp in Helmand in February 1999; and in Ghazni in July 1999, but the strikes were called off due to various factors, including questionable intelligence and the potential for collateral damage. Similarly, CIA-employed Afghans planned six times to attack bin Laden's convoy but did not, citing fears of civilian casualties, tight security, or that the al-Qaeda chief took a different route. Thus, Operation Infinite Reach was the only U.S. operation directed against bin Laden before the September 11 attacks. The operation's failure later dissuaded President George W. Bush from ordering similar strikes in the 2001 invasion of Afghanistan.

== See also ==
- Foreign policy of the Bill Clinton administration
- History of Afghanistan (1992–present)
- Sudan–United States relations
- Timeline of United States military operations
