= Robert Daum =

Robert Daum may refer to:

- Robert Daum (academic), American rabbi and theologian
- Robert Daum (politician) (1889–1962), German politician
- Rob Daum (born 1958), Canadian ice hockey coach
