= Eric Corey Freed =

American architect

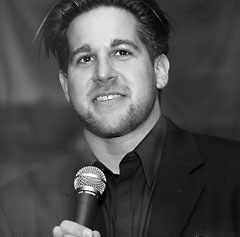
- Born: 1970 (age 55–56); Philadelphia, Pennsylvania
- Occupations: Architect, writer, Public Speaker

Eric Corey Freed (born 1970 in Philadelphia, Pennsylvania) is an American architect and founding principal of organicARCHITECT, which focuses on biophilic and regenerative design. He has been considered to be one of the leading influential green architects worldwide.

Freed grew up in Philadelphia and went to Overbrook High School. He graduated from Temple University College of Architecture with honors in 1994 and later received his Masters in Ecological Design from San Francisco Institute of Architecture.

== Career ==
Previously based in San Francisco, Freed is credited with helping establish the Sustainable Design curricula at both Academy of Art University and University of California, Berkeley Extension Program.

Freed is a practitioner in the tradition of organic architecture, first developed by Frank Lloyd Wright. The Founding Chair of Architecture for The San Francisco Design Museum, he was voted "Best Green Architect" by San Francisco Magazine in 2005 and "Best Visionary" in 2007. He is author of "Green Building for Dummies", published by Wiley in August 2007 and regular contributor to Natural Home Magazine, Luxe Magazine, and GreenerBuildings.com.

His firm organicARCHITECT was founded in 1997.

The firm is noted for various community outreach programs:

- organicAWARDS: an annual award recognizing the designs during the past year that are found to be both innovative and environmentally-friendly.
- Events: Since 2003, organicARCHITECT produces a monthly lecture series with the leaders of green business held at The Commonwealth Club.
- organicEVENTS: their free, monthly organicEVENTS list currently goes to over 8,800 people in the Bay Area, alerting them to all of the green, design and sustainability events around San Francisco.

In 2015, Freed was named a LEED Fellow by Green Business Certification Inc.(GBCI). In 2024, Freed was a Trailblazer Award winner at Verdical Group's annual Net Zero Conference.

Freed has served as "Principal, Director of Sustainability" at CannonDesign since 2020.

== Publications ==
- Eric Corey Freed, "Green Building & Remodeling for Dummies", John Wiley & Sons, 2007
- Eric Corey Freed (co-author), "Green Your Home for Dummies", John Wiley & Sons, 2008
- Eric Corey Freed, "Sustainable School Architecture" with Lisa Gelfand, John Wiley & Sons, 2009
- Eric Corey Freed with Kevin Daum, "Green$ense for the Home: Rating the Real Payoff from 50 Green Home Projects", Taunton Publishers, 2010

== Articles ==
- "5 Questions about our Future", Natural Home Magazine, April 2009
- "Green kitchens", SFDC Magazine, October 2008
- "Urban Eco-tecture", Metropolitan Home Magazine, April 2008
- "Green Landscaping", Luxe Magazine, September 2007
- Eric Corey Freed, "Avoid Greenwashers' False Claims: How Do I Know I'm Buying Green?”, Natural Home Magazine, July 2007
- “Solar Inspiration”, Luxe Magazine, June 2007
- “Why Green Building is Important”, Luxe Magazine, March 2007
- “Last Exit: The Inevitable Architect”, Next American City, January 2007
