= Jason Pontin =

British-born venture capitalist and journalist

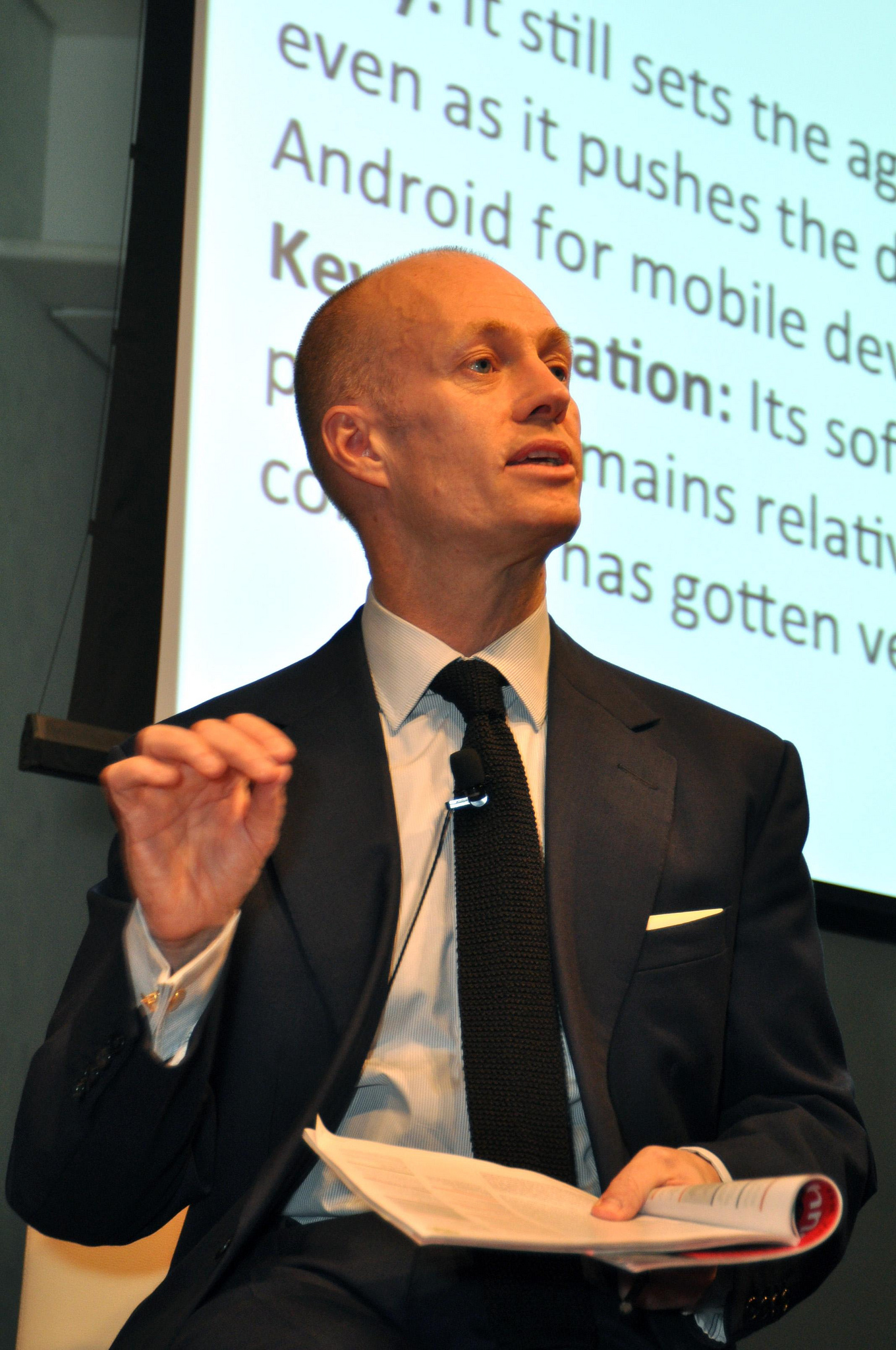
- Born: 11 May 1967 (age 59); London, England
- Education: Keble College, Oxford
- Occupations: Venture Capitalist, editor, journalist, and publisher

Jason Matthew Daniel Pontin (born 11 May 1967) is a British-born venture capitalist and journalist. He is a General Partner at the venture capital firm of DCVC in Palo Alto, California, and is a board member and early investor in a number of life sciences, industrial, climate, and other deep tech companies. He is the former editor in chief and publisher of MIT Technology Review.

== Early life and education ==
Pontin was born on 11 May 1967 in London, to a British father, Anthony Charles Pontin, a businessman, and a South African mother, Elaine Howells, an actress. He was raised in Northern California and educated in England, at Harrow School and Oxford University.

== Career ==
From 1996 to 2002, Pontin was the Editor of Red Herring, a business and technology publication. From 2002 to 2004, he was the Editor of The Acumen Journal, a now-defunct magazine he founded about the life sciences.

Pontin has written for many national and international magazines and newspapers, including The New York Times, The Economist, The Financial Times, The Boston Globe, The Believer Magazine, and Wired. He writes for Wired in the publication's "IDEAS" channel and contributes to the magazine. In February 2013, he delivered a TED Talk in Long Beach, California, "Can Technology solve our big problems?" that has been seen more than 1.6 million times.

He was hired as the editor of Technology Review in July 2004, and in August 2005 was named publisher. Pontin engaged in what The Boston Globe has described as a "strategic overhaul" of Technology Review, whose goal is to make the magazine into a largely electronic publishing company. In October 2012, he renamed the organization MIT Technology Review and relaunched it as a "digital-first enterprise". AdWeek commented that "Pontin and MIT Technology Review could set the standard for the transition to a digital future for legacy media." Pontin was Chairman of the MIT Enterprise Forum, MIT's global organization of technology entrepreneurs.

From 2005 to 2017, he was the Editor in Chief and Publisher of MIT Technology Review.

In 2015, he cofounded MIT Solve the institute's open innovation platform, which deploys capital and other resources towards solutions to grand challenges.

From 2018 to 2020, he was Senior Partner and senior advisor at Flagship Pioneering, an American life sciences venture capital company in Cambridge, Massachusetts.

In 2019, with CEO Neil Dhawan, he cofounded Totus Medicines, a chemical biology company whose drug discovery platform uses structure-based design, combinatorial chemistry, and automated biophysics to rapidly identify oncology therapies. Pontin is a board member of Totus Medicines.

Pontin has been a General Partner at DCVC since March 2021.
