= Margaret Wade =

Margaret Wade is the name of:

- Margaret Wade (basketball) (1912–1995), American basketball player and coach, member of the Basketball Hall of Fame
- A character in the comic strip Dennis the Menace
- Margaret Wade Labarge (1916–2009), Canadian historian
