= Dohm =

Dohm is a surname. Notable people with the surname include:

- Christian Wilhelm von Dohm (1751–1820), Prussian Christian diplomat, historian, advocate of the Jews
- Ernst Dohm (1819–1883), originally Elias Levy Dohm, pseudonym Karlchen Mießnick, German Jewish editor, actor, translator
- Gaby Dohm (born 1943), Austrian actress
- Hedwig Dohm (1831–1919), German Jewish actress, feminist, wife of Ernst Dohm
- Hedwig Pringsheim (1855–1942), née Dohm, German actress, daughter of Ernst and Hedwig Dohm
- Heinrich Dohm (1875–1940), Danish artist
- John E. Dohms (1948–2012), American researcher
- Nate Dohm (born 2003), American baseball player
- Patrick Dohm (1935–2023), Canadian judge
- Per Dohm (1938–2005), American Virgin Islander sailor
- Walter Dohm (1869–1894), American runner
- Will Dohm (1897–1948), German actor

== See also ==
- Dohm-Mann family tree
- Daum (disambiguation)
