= Mary McCarthy (CIA officer) =

CIA operative

Mary O'Neil McCarthy (born 1945) is a former United States Central Intelligence Agency (CIA) employee who last worked in the Office of the Inspector General. In her career, she was an intelligence analyst and national intelligence officer for warning.

She was dismissed on April 21, 2006, after, according to the CIA, an individual admitted "unauthorized contacts with the media and discussion of classified information" following a polygraph examination.

== Biography ==
Before entering the intelligence profession, McCarthy received a Ph.D. in history and an M.A. in library science from the University of Minnesota, as well as a B.A. and M.A. in history from Michigan State University. From 1979 to 1984 she held a position at BERI, S.A. According to its webpage, BERI provides risk assessment for businesses operating in an international environment, in which she conducted financial, operational, and political risk assessment for multinational corporations. She taught at the University of Minnesota and was director of the Social Science Data Archive at Yale University and wrote a book on the colonial history of present-day Ghana.

In 2005, McCarthy received a J.D. from Georgetown University Law Center after taking evening classes, and was admitted to the Maryland Bar in December 2005 and the District of Columbia Bar in 2007.

=== Career in intelligence ===
McCarthy began working for the CIA in 1984 as an analyst for Africa in the Directorate of Intelligence. She served as the deputy national intelligence officer for warning from 1991 to 1994 and as national intelligence officer for warning from 1994 to 1996.

Following her service as national intelligence officer for warning, McCarthy served as director of intelligence programs on the National Security Council staff. In 1998, Sandy Berger, then National Security Advisor for President Bill Clinton, appointed her as special assistant to the president and senior director for intelligence programs These NSC positions were competitive civil service jobs, not political appointments, according to the 2000 Plum Book listing presidentially appointed positions. succeeding Rand Beers. She remained at the NSC until July 2001, when she left to take a position with the Center for Strategic and International Studies as a visiting fellow in international security. It has been reported that she returned to CIA in a capacity within the Office of the Inspector General in 2005, and was within days of retiring.

In 1998, McCarthy opposed the bombing of al-Shifa pharmaceutical factory suspected of manufacturing chemical weapons. Immediately after the bombing the government of Sudan claimed the factory only made pharmaceuticals and demanded an apology from the United States. Neither the Clinton nor Bush administrations have apologized for the attack. The 9/11 Commission Report found that, in April 2000, the National Security staff reviewed the intelligence and agreed that al-Shifa was used in chemical weapons development. The memo to Sandy Berger was signed by Richard Clarke and Mary McCarthy, showing that McCarthy had changed her view to support the bombing of the plant (see footnote 50 on page 482 of the report).

In 2003, she testified before the 9/11 Commission about warning systems.

=== Campaign contributions ===
In the wake of her dismissal, The New York Times reported McCarthy had donated $2,000 to the John Kerry campaign.

According to public records, McCarthy contributed $5,000 to the Ohio Democratic Party and $500 to the Democratic National Committee in October 2004, and $200 to Steve Andreasen, the Minnesota Democratic–Farmer–Labor Party candidate for the 1st District of Minnesota, U.S. House of Representatives, but lost to incumbent Gil Gutknecht in November 2002. According to The Washington Post, the White House has "recently barraged the agency with questions about the political affiliations of some of its senior intelligence officers".

== Leak scandal ==
On April 21, 2006, it was reported that a CIA employee was dismissed for releasing classified material. The employee was subsequently identified as Mary McCarthy by the New York Times and other news organizations. Sources said the firing occurred after a polygraph examination indicated the possibility of deception and she subsequently admitted revealing classified information. McCarthy reportedly had leaked information to the Washington Post's Dana Priest on several occasions. Her identity has as yet not been confirmed officially by government sources; however, several CIA spokespersons have talked to the press about the incident. CIA spokeswoman Michele Neff is quoted as saying, "This CIA officer acknowledged having unauthorized discussions with the media in which the officer knowingly shared classified intelligence, including operational information."

On April 24, McCarthy's lawyer, Ty Cobb, told the New York Times that she "categorically denied leaking classified information [and] having access to the information attributed to her". It was not in dispute that she had unauthorized contact with reporters. NBC's Andrea Mitchell called such contact a "firing offense", adding, "but no one can recall anyone being fired for this". Prior to being fired, she had submitted her resignation on February 7, 2006, and her scheduled last day of work was April 30. On the same day, a Newsweek story quoted Beers as saying that she "categorically denie[d] being the source of the leak". The same Newsweek article reported that a "counter-terrorism official ... acknowledged that in firing McCarthy, the CIA was not necessarily accusing her of being the principal, original, or sole leaker of any particular story".

According to David Johnston and Scott Shane of the New York Times, "In an effort to stem leaks, the Bush administration launched several initiatives this year [2006] targeting journalists and national security employees. They include FBI probes, extensive polygraphing inside the CIA and a warning from the Justice Department that reporters could be prosecuted under espionage laws."

As yet, no criminal charges have been filed against McCarthy. The media has also reported that intelligence and law enforcement officials indicated that charges would not likely be filed against McCarthy. According to news reports, other CIA officials have leaked classified information without being fired or prosecuted. Most notable among these is Paul R. Pillar who leaked portions of a classified National Intelligence Estimate he worked on.

=== Criminal Code ===
According to David Johnston and Scott Shane of The New York Times, "In an effort to stem leaks, the Bush administration launched several initiatives this year [2006] targeting journalists and national security employees. They include FBI probes, extensive polygraphing inside the CIA and a warning from the Justice Department that reporters could be prosecuted under espionage laws". The relevant parts of the Espionage Act of 1917 is in U.S. Code Title 18, Part I, Chapter 37. Deliberate disclosure of classified material for which one is entrusted access fall under Section §794 and Section §798 (see , ). These laws carry penalties of up to capital punishment or up to ten years imprisonment, respectively.

=== Polygraph investigation ===
The polygraph investigation was part of a large-scale investigation into intelligence leaks. According to the Los Angeles Times, "In the last several months, the agency has conducted dozens of 'single-issue' polygraph examinations in which senior officers were asked exclusively about contacts with news organizations and disclosures of classified information". Some have suggested that the investigations may have been politically motivated. Former CIA officer Melissa Boyle Mahle while appearing on MSNBC's Countdown on April 24, 2006, that many in the agency consider the leak investigation a "witch hunt". She added that, "within the agency, there is no such thing as a good leak. And everybody looks at that pretty much through the same optic. Leaks are bad. Nobody supports it. And if you are caught leaking, you're—not only are you going to get fired and lose your security clearance, but you're going to lose the respect of your colleagues". She observed that Director of Central Intelligence Porter Goss focused on leaks from "the first day [he] came over to the CIA" and suggests that "employees feel targeted" by what is widely perceived as a witch hunt.

On November 14, 2004, Newsday quoted a former senior CIA official on the political implications of Goss's focus on leaks: "The agency is being purged on instructions from the White House. ... Goss was given instructions ... to get rid of those soft leakers and liberal Democrats. The CIA is looked on by the White House as a hotbed of liberals and people who have been obstructing the president's agenda." Less than two weeks after McCarthy's dismissal, Goss himself was forced out of the CIA, resigning his directorship "under pressure" on May 5, 2005.

=== Black sites ===
On April 21, 2006, NBC reported that the "leak pertained to stories on the CIA's rumored secret prisons in Eastern Europe", commonly known as "black sites". The article added that the original Washington Post report, authored by Dana Priest, "caused an international uproar, and government officials have said it did significant damage to relationships between the U.S. and allied intelligence agencies". Earlier in April 2006, Priest received a Pulitzer Prize for beat journalism for her report on the black sites, a decision that was criticized by some political commentators as Priest refused to identify her sources. Accuracy in Media demanded Priest reveal her sources or return the Pulitzer Prize.

A day later the New York Times reported, "Intelligence officials speaking on the condition of anonymity said that the dismissal resulted from "a pattern of conduct" and not from a single leak, but that the case involved in part information about secret CIA detention centers that was given to The Washington Post". McCarthy has denied being the source of that information. Her lawyer denies she even had access to that information. It was reported that some of the information about rendition operations may have been available from unclassified sources. Newsweek reported that "Intelligence officials privately acknowledge that key news stories about secret agency prison and "extraordinary rendition" operations have been based, at least in part, upon information available from unclassified sources."

On April 25, the Washington Post reported that McCarthy's leaks had nothing to do with secret prisons: "Though McCarthy acknowledged having contact with reporters, a senior intelligence official confirmed yesterday that she is not believed to have played a central role in The Post's reporting on the secret prisons. The official spoke on the condition of anonymity, citing personnel matters." A follow-up story on May 14 by the Washington Post posited that McCarthy "had been probing allegations of criminal mistreatment by the CIA and its contractors in Iraq and Afghanistan", and became convinced that "CIA people had lied" in a meeting with Senate staff in June 2005.

=== Responses and opinions ===
The response to the revelations in the intelligence community has been mixed. Some former colleagues stressed the illegality and impropriety of leaking classified documents, while others praised the act of alerting the public to possible misconduct within the CIA. Most internal CIA sources requested anonymity. A number of these sources voiced doubts as to whether McCarthy had actually leaked the information.

The Washington Post quoted a former senior intelligence official who claimed to have discussed the matter with former colleagues on the previous day as saying, "A majority of CIA officers would probably find the action taken [against McCarthy] correct. ... A small number might support her, but the ethic of the business is not to leak, and instead to express one's dissenting views through internal grievance channels."

Referring to a senior law enforcement official's comments on the possibility of a criminal prosecution of McCarthy, a Fox News report said "if the person admitted to leaking classified information, it would be almost negligent not to prosecute them for breaking the law. Failing a polygraph in and of itself does not qualify a person for prosecution but an admission does."

NBC's Andrea Mitchell commented that the CIA's action may be an attempt to send a message about leaks as well as a broader message about any contact with reporters:

Now they've found someone who was about to retire, and they're sending a very tough message. The bottom line is that no one is going to have the courage or the stupidity or the will to talk to reporters from now on. Very few people will, because they can see from this example, what can happen to you ... The purpose is, don't even have lunch with reporters. The purpose is, don't have dinner with reporters. Don't pick up the phone if a reporter calls. It doesn't matter what you say, you're not supposed to have a contact with reporters without telling the higher-ups.

Robert David Steele, a former intelligence officer associated with the open-source intelligence movement, issued a press release praising McCarthy's actions in leaking information, stating that "There is absolutely no question that Mary acted in the finest traditions of the Republic, helping reveal and reduce terrible violations of international law and human rights by the CIA." Steele added, "Mary McCarthy should accept her firing with pride—she served the Republic, and has been fired by individuals who will eventually be censured if not impeached. America owes her a vote of thanks."

Ray McGovern, who worked as a CIA analyst for 27 years, suggested that if McCarthy leaked the information about "black sites", "if she's in the chain of command and she sees these kinds of crimes being perpetrated, under Nuremberg and other international law, she is required ... to do something".

Richard Kerr spent 32 years at the CIA and regarding McCarthy said "she should have argued against the policy, but not to provide information on a classified basis that she had an obligation to protect" and regarding leaks in general said, "If every individual or senior officer in CIA decides they're going to make the judgments of what policies or what activities the CIA are appropriate on their own, as an individual, you have an organization that cannot function."

Terrorism expert Rand Beers, a Democratic campaign advisor, commented that "Goss and company were just looking for someone to fire to prove that they were serious about leak investigation. And they could portray her as political."
