= Canadian Society of Medievalists =

Canadian learned society

- Société canadienne des médiévistes
- Abbreviation: CSM
- Type: Learned society
- Region served: Canada
- President: Marc Cels
- Affiliations: CARMEN; Canadian Federation for the Humanities and Social Sciences
- Website: canadianmedievalists.org

Canadian Society of Medievalists (CSM; French: Société canadienne des médiévistes [SCM]) is a Canadian learned society of medievalists "dedicated to promoting excellence in research for all aspects of medieval studies".

In addition to its biannual newsletter, Scrinium, the society publishes Florilegium, "an international, peer-reviewed journal concerned with the study of late Antiquity and the Middle Ages". It holds an annual conference together with other scholarly groups as part of the Congress of the Canadian Federation for the Humanities and Social Sciences (the "Learneds"), and develops and collaborates on scholarly projects with related associations including the international network of medievalists, CARMEN (the Co-operative for the Advancement of Research through a Medieval European Network).

The society's first president was Margaret Wade Labarge, in 1993.

== Awards ==
The society offers several awards:

- The Margaret Wade Labarge Book Prize — awarded to a book published "in the field of medieval studies [and] authored or co-authored, translated or co-translated, edited or co-edited, ... by a Canadian or someone resident in Canada"
- The Leonard E. Boyle Dissertation Prize — "awarded to an outstanding dissertation in any field of medieval studies ... written by a Canadian or by someone resident in Canada"
- The Student Presentation Prize — "awarded annually for the best student presentation delivered at the CSM/SCM Conference"
