= Kevin Daum =

- Born: Los Angeles, California, U.S.
- Education: Humboldt State University
- Occupations: Author; columnist; entrepreneurship coach; marketer; speaker

Kevin Daum is an American author, columnist, entrepreneurship coach, marketer, and speaker. He currently writes for Inc.com and his columns have also appeared in the Huffington Post, Leader2Leader Magazine, and Smart Business Magazine.

== Background ==
Born and raised in Los Angeles, Daum graduated from Humboldt State University in 1986 with a degree in theater arts.

Daum founded and operated Stratford Financial Services in 1989. In 1995, Daum founded and sold an entertainment venture, Mystery is Served. Daum then studied at the MIT Enterprise Forum and graduated from the Entrepreneurial Masters program in 2001.

The Stratford Financial Services grew to become an Inc. 500 company by 1999 and was sold it in 2007. Daum founded TAE International in 2008.

== Career ==
Daum has authored several books including "ROAR! Get Heard in the Sales and Marketing Jungle" published by Wiley in 2010 and "Video Marketing For Dummies" published by Wiley in 2012. His book "Green$ense For the Home: Rating the Real Payoff on 50 Green Home Projects", co-authored with Eric Corey Freed (Taunton), won an American Society of Journalists and Author's (ASJA) Outstanding Book Award in 2011.

He has held board positions for the Entrepreneur's Organization and was a founding member of its Silicon Valley chapter.

In 2006, Daum was named Humboldt State University's Distinguished Alum of the Year.

== Bibliography ==
- "What the Banks Won’t Tell You", Grady Parsons, 2004
- "Building Your Own Home For Dummies" with Peter Economy and Janice Brewster, John Wiley & Sons, 2005
- "Green$ense for the Home: Rating the Real Payoff from 50 Green Home Projects" with Eric Corey Freed, Taunton Publishers, 2010
- "ROAR" Get Heard in the Sales and Marketing Jungle" With Daniel Turner, John Wiley & Sons, 2010
- "Video Marketing For Dummies" with Matt Scott, Bettina Hein, Andreas Goeldi, John Wiley & Sons, 2012
