= Al-Shifa pharmaceutical factory =

Sudanese complex bombed by the US in 1998

Coordinates: 15°38′45″N 32°33′41″E

1998 Al-Shifa pharmaceutical factory missile strike
- Part of Operation Infinite Reach
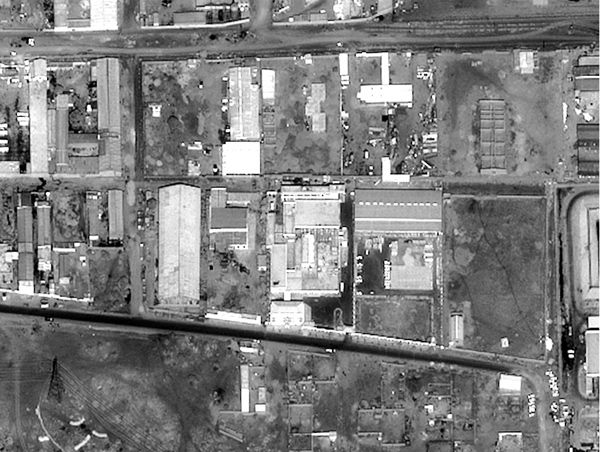
- U.S. reconnaissance satellite image of the Al-Shifa pharmaceutical factory in 1998
- Location: Kafouri, Khartoum North, Sudan
- Date: 20 August 1998
- Attack type: Cruise missile strike
- Weapon: Tomahawk missiles
- Deaths: 1 civilian
- Injuries: 11 civilians
- Perpetrator: United States Navy

The al-Shifa pharmaceutical factory (Arabic: الشفاء, romanized: aš-šifāʔ, lit. 'remedy') in Kafouri, Khartoum North, Sudan, was constructed between 1992 and 1996 with components imported from Germany, India, Italy, Sweden, Switzerland, Thailand and the United States. It was opened on 12 July 1997 and bombed by the United States on 20 August 1998. The industrial complex was composed of four buildings. It was the largest pharmaceutical factory in Khartoum and employed over 300 workers, producing medicine both for human and veterinary use.

The factory was destroyed in 1998 by a missile attack launched by the United States, killing one employee and wounding eleven. The U.S. government claimed that the factory was used for the processing of VX nerve agent and that the owners of the plant had ties to the terrorist group al-Qaeda.

These justifications for the bombing were disputed by the owners of the plant, the Sudanese government, and other governments. American officials later acknowledged "that the evidence that prompted President Clinton to order the missile strike on the Shifa plant was not as solid as first portrayed. Officials would later state that there was no proof that the plant had been manufacturing or storing nerve gas - as initially suspected by the Americans - or that it had been linked to Osama bin Laden, who was a resident of Khartoum in the 1980s." The attack took place during the Monica Lewinsky scandal and less than a year after the release of the film Wag the Dog, prompting some commentators to describe the attack as a distraction for the public from the scandal.

== Destruction ==
On 20 August 1998, the factory was destroyed in cruise missile strikes launched by the United States military (Note: There was a total of 75 to 80 Tomahawk cruise missiles launched against all targets according to a report by the BBC.) allegedly in retaliation for the truck bomb attacks on its embassies in Dar es Salaam, Tanzania, and Nairobi, Kenya, on 7 August. The administration of President Bill Clinton justified the attacks, dubbed Operation Infinite Reach, on the grounds that the al-Shifa plant was involved with processing the deadly nerve agent VX, and had ties with the Islamist al-Qaeda group of Osama bin Laden, which was believed to be behind the embassy bombings and Operation Bojinka, an alleged large-scale terrorist plot. U.S. action on 20 August also hit al-Qaeda camps in Afghanistan, where bin Laden had moved following his May 1996 expulsion from Sudan. The German ambassador in Sudan from 1996 to 2000, Werner Daum, informed the German Foreign Ministry on the day of the bombing that the plant could not be called a factory for chemical weapons. Rather, the factory “mainly produced human medicines, such as antibiotics, antimalarial medication, anti-diarrheal medicines, infusion fluids and some veterinary medicines.”

== Evidence ==
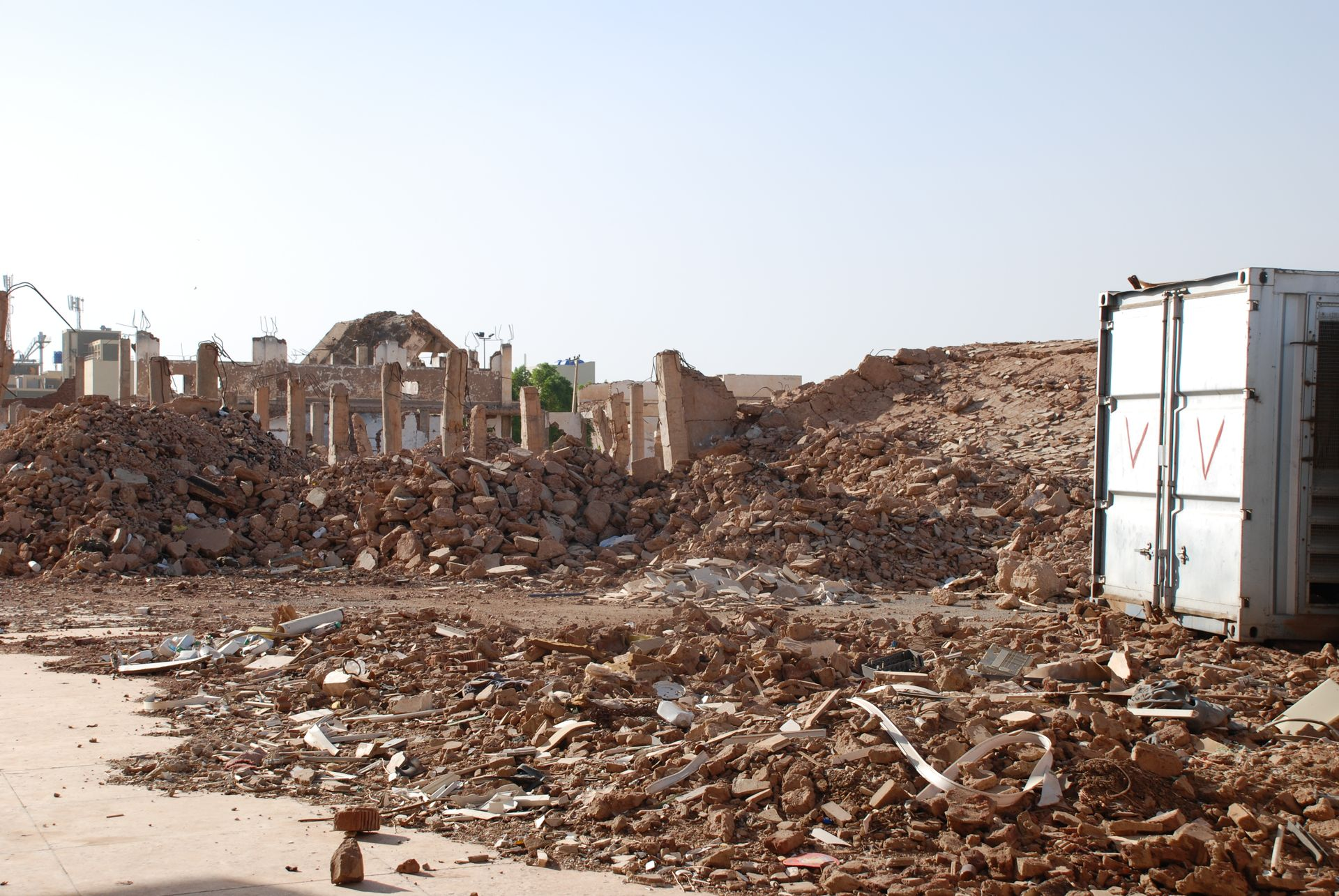
Ruins of the destroyed factory in 2008

The key piece of physical evidence linking the Al-Shifa facility to production of chemical weapons was the discovery of EMPTA in a soil sample taken from the plant during a CIA clandestine operation. EMPTA, or O-Ethyl methylphosphonothioic acid, is classified as a Schedule 2B compound under the Chemical Weapons Convention, meaning that while it is a chemical weapons precursor (it can be used to manufacture VX nerve agent), it also has legitimate small-scale applications outside of chemical warfare and so is permitted to be manufactured in small quantities. Although potential uses and patented processes using EMPTA existed, such as the manufacture of plastic, no known industrial uses of EMPTA were ever documented, nor were any products that contained EMPTA. It is, however, not banned by the Chemical Weapons Convention, as originally claimed by the U.S. government. Moreover, the presence of EMPTA near the boundary of Al-Shifa does not prove that it was produced in the factory; EMPTA could have been "stored in or transported near Al-Shifa, instead of being produced by it", according to a report by Michael Barletta.

Under-Secretary of State Thomas Pickering claimed to have sufficient evidence against Sudan, including contacts between officials at Al-Shifa plant and Iraqi chemical weapons experts, with the Iraq chemical weapons program the only one identified with using EMPTA for VX production. The National Democratic Alliance (NDA), a Sudanese opposition in Cairo led by Mubarak Al-Mahdi, also insisted that the plant was producing ingredients for chemical weapons. According to Clinton Administration officials, the plant, moreover, was heavily guarded, and showed no signs of ordinary commercial activities. However, a British engineer, Thomas Carnaffin, who worked as a technical manager during the plant's construction between 1992 and 1996, stated that the plant was neither heavily guarded nor secret, and that he never observed evidence of the production of an ingredient needed for nerve gas. The group that monitors compliance with the treaty banning chemical weapons announced that EMPTA did have legitimate commercial purposes in the manufacture of fungicides and antibiotics, and the owner of the factory stated emphatically in interviews that the plant was not used for anything other than pharmaceuticals, and that there was no evidence to the contrary. Former Clinton administration counter terrorism advisor Richard Clarke and former national security advisor Sandy Berger also noted the facility's alleged ties with the former Iraqi government. Clarke also cited Iraq's $199,000 contract with al-Shifa for veterinary medicine under the UN's Oil-for-Food Programme. David Kay, a former UN weapons inspector also said that Iraq may have assisted in the construction of the Al-Shifa plant, noting also that Sudan would be unlikely to have the technical knowledge to produce VX.

Officials later acknowledged, however, "that the evidence that prompted President Clinton to order the missile strike on the Shifa plant was not as solid as first portrayed. Indeed, officials later said that there was no proof that the plant had been manufacturing or storing nerve gas, as initially suspected by the Americans, or had been linked to Osama bin Laden, who was a resident of Khartoum in the 1980s."

However, a Clinton State Department official stated that a money manager for bin Laden claimed that bin Laden had invested in Al-Shifa. The Al-Shifa factory general manager, Osman Sylayman, lived in the same Sudan house where bin Laden had previously lived.

The U.S. State Department's Bureau of Intelligence and Research wrote a report in 1999 questioning the attack on the factory, suggesting that the connection to bin Laden was not accurate. James Risen reported in the New York Times: "Now, the analysts renewed their doubts and told Assistant Secretary of State Phyllis Oakley that the C.I.A.'s evidence on which the attack was based was inadequate. Ms. Oakley asked them to double-check; perhaps there was some intelligence they had not yet seen. The answer came back quickly: There was no additional evidence. Ms. Oakley called a meeting of key aides and a consensus emerged: Contrary to what the Administration was saying, the case tying Al Shifa to Mr. bin Laden or to chemical weapons was weak." The Chairman of El Shifa Pharmaceutical Industries, who is critical of the Sudanese government, told reporters: "I had inventories of every chemical and records of every employee's history. There were no such [nerve gas] chemicals being made here."

In 2004, nonetheless, Clinton's Secretary of Defense William Cohen testified to the 9/11 Commission by characterizing Al-Shifa as a "WMD-related facility", which played a "chemical weapons role" such as to pose a risk that it, with the help of the alleged Iraqi chemical weapons program connections, might help Al Qaeda get chemical weapons technology.

The Sudanese government wants the plant preserved in its destroyed condition as a reminder of the American attack and have called on the United Nations to investigate the incident, which the U.S. opposed. Sudan has asked the U.S. for an apology for the attack but the U.S. has refused on the grounds it has not ruled out the possibility the plant had some connection to chemical weapons development.

Directly after the strike the Sudanese government demanded that the United Nations Security Council conduct an investigation of the site to determine if it had been used to produce chemical weapons or precursors. Such an investigation was opposed by the U.S., which has also blocked an independent laboratory analysis of the sample allegedly containing EMPTA. Michael Barletta concludes that there is no evidence the Al-Shifa factory was ever involved in production of chemical weapons, and it is known that many of the initial U.S. allegations were wrong.

== Consequences ==
The Observer noted that "[T]he loss of this factory is a tragedy for the rural communities who need these medicines" quoting Tom Carnaffin, technical manager with "intimate knowledge" of the destroyed plant. A month later, Guardian correspondent Patrick Wintour elaborated that the plant "provided 50 per cent of Sudan’s medicines, and its destruction has left the country with no supplies of chloroquine, the standard treatment for malaria". He also noted that the British government (who publicly supported the U.S. decision to bomb the factory) refused requests "to resupply chloroquine in emergency relief until such time as the Sudanese can rebuild their pharmaceutical production". The factory was a principal source of Sudan's anti-malaria and veterinary drugs according to the CBW (Chemical & Biological Weapons) Conventions Bulletin.

Germany's ambassador to Sudan at the time of the airstrike, Werner Daum, wrote an article in 2001, in which he called "several tens of thousands of deaths" of Sudanese civilians caused by a medicine shortage a "reasonable guess".

Human Rights Watch reported that the bombing had the unintended effect of stopping relief efforts aimed at supplying food to areas of Sudan gripped by famine caused by that country's ongoing civil war. Many of these agencies had been wholly or partially staffed by Americans who subsequently evacuated the country out of fear of retaliation. A letter by that agency to President Clinton stated "many relief efforts have been postponed indefinitely, including a crucial one run by the U.S.-based International Rescue Committee where more than fifty southerners are dying daily". Mark Huband in the Financial Times wrote that the attack "shattered ... the expected benefits of a political shift at the heart of Sudan's Islamicist government" towards a "pragmatic engagement with the outside world".

Journalist Jason Burke, in the book Al-Qaeda: Casting a Shadow of Terror, claims that Operation Infinite Reach "merely confirmed to [bin Laden and his close associates], and others with similar views worldwide, that their conception of the world as a cosmic struggle between good and evil was the right one".

== Criticism ==
Christopher Hitchens wrote that the factory "could not have been folded like a tent and spirited away in a day or so. And the United States has diplomatic relations with Sudan. ... Well then, what was the hurry? ... There is really only one possible answer to that question. Clinton needed to look 'presidential' for a day."

The 9/11 Commission Report evaluated such so-called "Wag the Dog" theories (the strikes being motivated to deflect attention from domestic, political troubles), and found no reason to believe them, nor disbelieve the testimony and assertions of former President Clinton, former Vice President Gore, CIA Chief Tenet, nor former security advisors Berger and Clarke that the destruction of Al-Shifa was still, as of 2004, a justifiable national security target.

The U.S. Justice Department, under President George W. Bush, produced an alleged al-Qaeda defector as a witness on 13 February 2001, in its ongoing case against Osama Bin Laden. The witness, Jamal al-Fadl, testified that al-Qaeda operatives he was involved with had been engaged in manufacturing chemical weapons in Khartoum, Sudan, around 1993 or 1994.

In 2001, The Guardian reported that "the factory's owner, Salah Idris, vigorously denied that he or the factory had any link with such weapons or any terrorist group. He attempted to sue the U.S. government for £35 million ($50 million) after hiring experts to show that the plant made only medicines. Despite growing support for Idris's case in the U.S. and Britain, Washington refused to retract any of its claims and contested the lawsuit. The court dismissed the case under the political question doctrine, and Idris appealed unsuccessfully.

The bombing of the al-Shifa factory resurfaced in the news in April 2006 after the firing of former CIA analyst Mary McCarthy. McCarthy was against the bombing of the factory in 1998, and had written a formal letter of protest to President Clinton. According to former CIA analyst Michael Scheuer, she had voiced doubts that the factory had ties to al-Qaeda or was producing chemical weapons. The New York Times reported: "In the case of the Al Shifa pharmaceutical plant in Khartoum, Sudan, her concerns may have been well-founded. Sudanese officials and the plant's owner denied any connection to Al Qaeda. In the aftermath of the attack, the internal White House debate over whether the intelligence reports about the plant were accurate spilled into the press. Eventually, Clinton administration officials conceded that the hardest evidence used to justify striking the plant was a single soil sample that seemed to indicate the presence of a chemical used in making VX gas."

== Responsibility ==
Thomas Joscelyn quotes Daniel Benjamin, a former U.S. National Security Council staffer: "The report of the 9/11 Commission notes that the National Security staff reviewed the intelligence in April 2000 and concluded that the CIA's assessment of its intelligence on bin Laden and al-Shifa had been valid; the memo to Clinton on this was cosigned by Richard Clarke and Mary McCarthy, the NSC senior director for intelligence programs, who opposed the bombing of al-Shifa in 1998. The report also notes that in their testimony before the commission, Al Gore, Sandy Berger, George Tenet, and Richard Clarke all stood by the decision to bomb al-Shifa."

Former Secretary of Defense Cohen defended, in his testimony to the 9/11 Commission in 2004, along with other cited Clinton security cabinet members in their separate 9/11 Commission testimony, the decision to destroy Al-Shifa: "At the time, the intelligence community at the highest level repeatedly assured us that 'it never gets better than this' in terms of confidence in an intelligence conclusion regarding a hard target. There was a good reason for this confidence, including multiple, reinforcing elements of information ranging from links that the organization that built the facility had both with Bin Laden and with the leadership of the Iraqi chemical weapons program; extraordinary security when the facility was constructed; physical evidence from the site; and other information from HUMINT and technical sources. Given what we knew regarding terrorists’ interest in acquiring and using chemical weapons against Americans, and given the intelligence assessment provided us regarding the al-Shifa facility, I continue to believe that destroying it was the right decision."

== See also ==
- Sudan–United States relations
- United States and state terrorism
