= Werner Daum =

German diplomat (1943–2025)

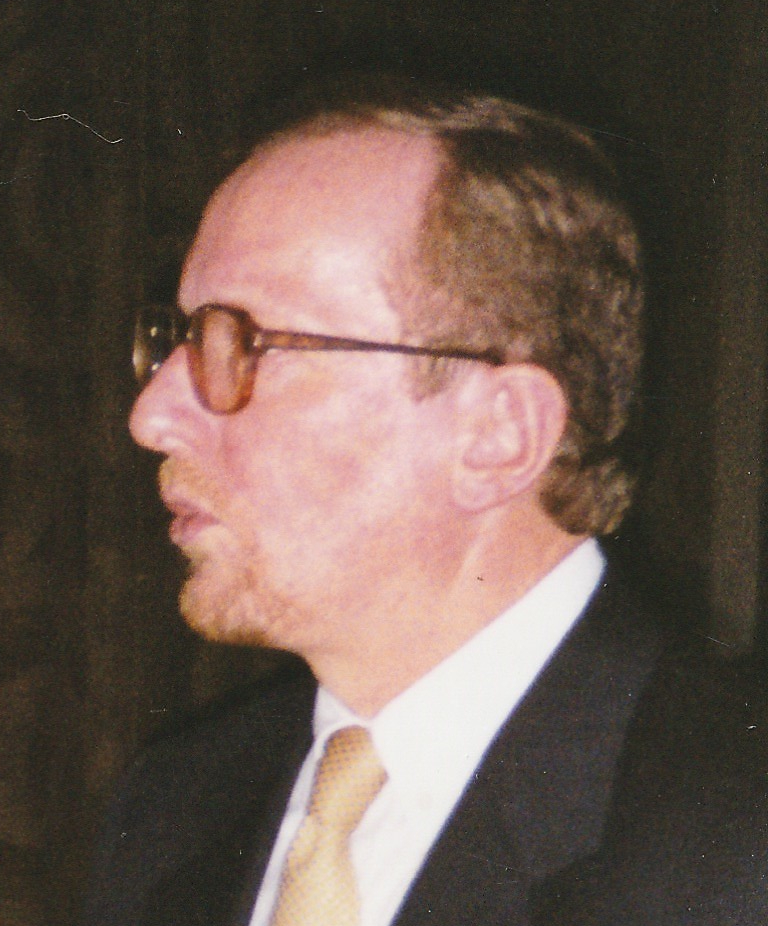
- Daum in 2000

Ambassador of Germany to Sudan
- In office 1996–2000
- Preceded by: Peter Mende
- Succeeded by: Matthias Meyer

Ambassador of Germany to Albania
- In office 1987–1988
- Preceded by: Office re-established
- Succeeded by: Friedrich Kroneck

Head of Human rights Department, German Mission in Geneva
- In office 1992–1995

Minister-Counsellor, Embassy of Germany in Tirana

Personal details
- Born: 14 July 1943 Nuremberg, Germany
- Died: 12 July 2025 (aged 81) Golem, Albania
- Education: Goethe University Frankfurt (PhD in Law); University of Pisa; American University of Beirut; American University in Cairo
- Occupation: Diplomat, jurist, author

Werner Daum (14 July 1943 – 12 July 2025) was a German diplomat and author, specialising in the cultural history of Yemen, Sudan and the Arabian Peninsula.

== Diplomatic career ==
From 1992 to 1995, he was Head of the Human Rights Department in the German mission in Geneva. As such, he represented Germany on the Commission on Human Rights and various other Human Rights organisations of the United Nations in Geneva. After having served as minister-counsellor at the German embassy in Tirana, Daum was Germany's ambassador to Sudan from 1996 to 2000.

== Publications on political events and art history of the Middle East ==
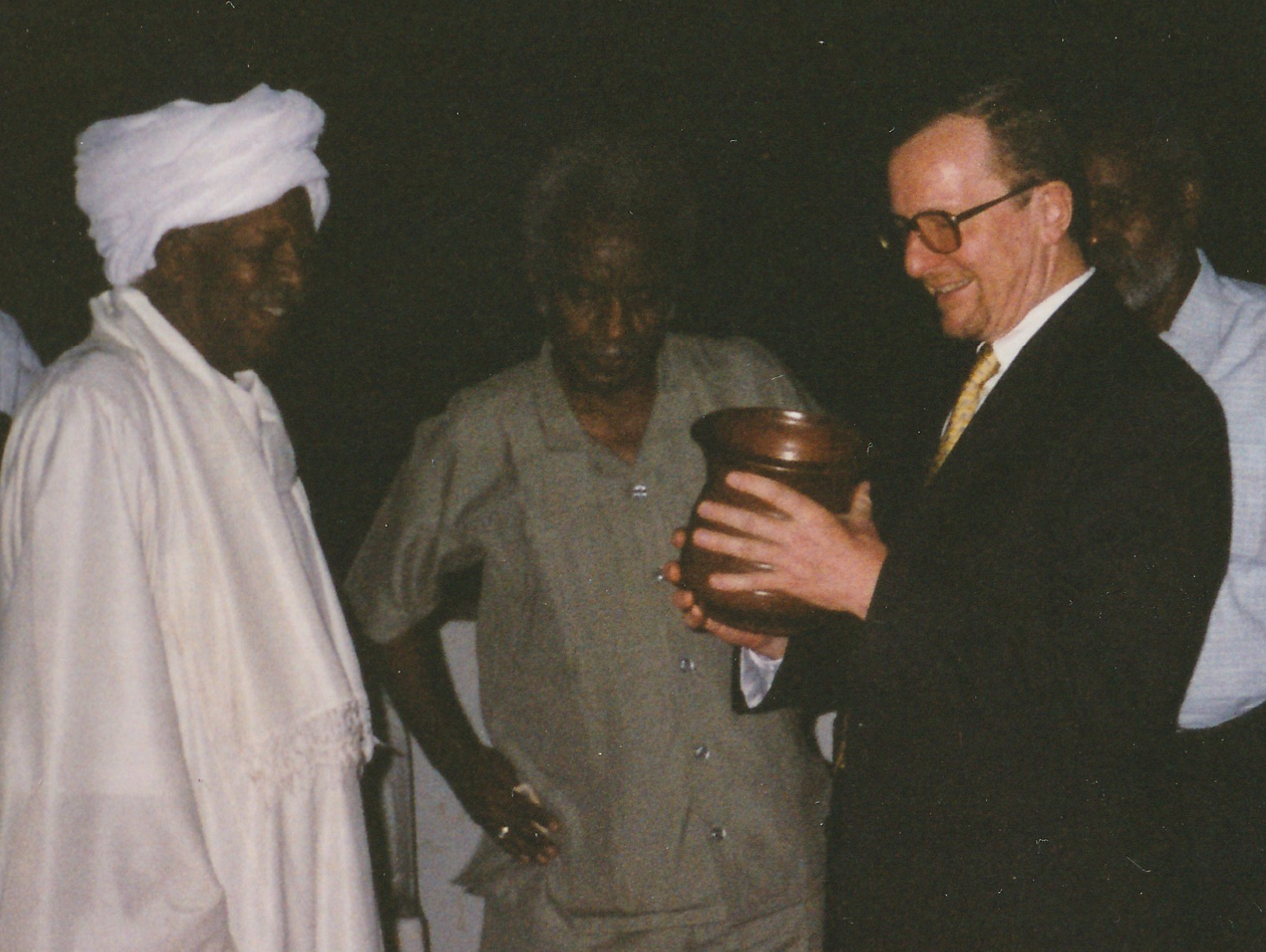
At a farewell ceremony in Khartoum

In 2000–2001, Daum was a fellow at the Weatherhead Center for International Affairs at Harvard University. In the summer of 2001, Daum wrote an article for the Harvard International Review entitled “Universalism and the West — An Agenda for Understanding”, in which he criticised the US government for destroying the Al-Shifa pharmaceutical factory in Khartoum during the 1998 bombing campaign, codenamed Operation Infinite Reach. Having worked in Sudan as ambassador of Germany during the time of the attack, he wrote that there was no evidence that the factory had produced precursors to chemical weapons and that Ghazi Sulayman, an internationally respected Sudanese human rights advocate, was a credible witness to this. Furthermore, Daum claimed that the attack caused a serious shortage in medication and that a "reasonable guess" for the deaths of civilians in Sudan caused by this shortage was in the "tens of thousands". This claim was described as "hard to take seriously" and implausible by historian Keith Windschuttle.

In 1999, the Museum für Völkerkunde, now Museum Fünf Kontinente, (Museum of Ethnography) in Munich, Germany, published Daum's comprehensive catalogue for its exhibition on the cultural history of Yemen. Apart from this, Daum is the author of several other books and articles on the cultural history of Albania, Sudan or Yemen, with a special interest in the pre-Islamic history of Yemen.

== Death ==
On 12 July 2025, Daum was found dead in his hotel room in Golem, near Kavajë, Albania, where he had been attending events to honour Josif Budo. He was 81. Police stated that there were no signs of foul play and preliminary findings indicated a natural cause of death.

== Publications ==
- Daum, Werner (2021). "Abraha's cathedral: Change and continuity of a sacred place". In Hatke, George; Ruzicka, Ronald (eds.). South Arabian long-distance trade in antiquity: "Out of Arabia". Newcastle upon Tyne: Cambridge Scholars Publishing. pp. 245–259. ISBN 9781527564565. OCLC 1249751632.
- Daum, Werner (2016). "The origins of Yemen's traditional silver jewellery". In Pogorelsky, P.I.; Vasilenko, M.I. (eds.). Arabian routes in the Asian context (PDF). Sankt Peterburg. pp. 191–234. ISBN 978-5-88431-323-1.
- Daum, Werner (2017). "Tithes for the God and the origins of the cult at Mecca. Continuity of religious practice in Arabia from the pre-Islamic period to the present day" (PDF). Anthropos. 112 (2): 517–535. doi:10.5771/0257-9774-2017-2-517. S2CID 216999749 – via www.nomos-elibrary.de.
- Daum, Werner. Yemen: 3000 Years of Art and Civilisation in Arabia Felix. Innsbruck: Pinguin-Verlag, 1987.
- Daum, Werner. Im Land der Königin von Saba. Kunstschätze aus dem antiken Jemen; 7. Juli 1999 - 9. Januar 2000. Eine Ausstellung des Staatlichen Museums für Völkerkunde München. 1999. (in German)
- Daum, Werner. "Universalism and the West", The Future of War, Vol. 23, Summer 2001
- Daum, Werner. “Democracy, Human Rights and Secure Oil Supply” Weatherhead Center Fellows' Papers
- Daum, Werner and Rashid Diab (2009). Modern Art in Sudan In Hopkins, Peter G. (ed.) Kenana Handbook of Sudan. New York: Routledge, pp. 453–516 ISBN 0-7103-1160-5
