= Father George Kehoe Memorial Award =

The Father George Kehoe Memorial Award is awarded annually to the U Sports men's ice hockey Coach of the Year as selected by the U Sports Men's Hockey Coaches Association.

The award is named in honour of the late Rev. George Kehoe, a St. Francis Xavier University alumni and Nova Scotia Sport Hall of Fame inductee who was the director of athletics at St. Francis Xavier University for many years.
