= Margaret Wade Labarge =

Canadian historian (1916–2009)

Margaret Labarge CM FRSC
- Born: Margaret Wade; July 18, 1916; New York City, New York, United States
- Died: August 31, 2009 (aged 93); Ottawa, Ontario, Canada
- Other name: Polly Labarge
- Spouse: Raymond Labarge (m. 1940; died 1971)
- Children: 2 daughters and 2 sons
- Parent(s): Alfred Wade; Cecilia Mein

Scholarly background
- Education: Radcliffe College; St Anne's College, Oxford
- Academic advisor: Sir F. M. Powicke

Scholarly work
- Discipline: History
- Sub-discipline: Medieval history

Margaret Wade Labarge CM FRSC (18 July 1916 – 31 August 2009) was a Canadian historian specializing in the role of women in the Middle Ages. She was adjunct professor of history at Carleton University.

Labarge attended Harvard and Oxford universities, and taught at the University of Ottawa before her move to Carleton. In 1982, she was made a Member of the Order of Canada. In 1988, she was made a Fellow of the Royal Society of Canada. She authored nine books about history.

== Early life and family ==
Margaret Wade was born on July 18, 1916, in New York City and grew up on the Upper East Side. Her father, Alfred B. Wade, was a partner in a brokerage firm and her mother, Cecilia Helen Mein Wade, was an alumnus of Sacred Heart. Her parents had expectations of her that were no less than those for her three older brothers: Monroe became and actor and drama teacher in Princeton; Hugh became head of the Canadian Studies department at the University of Rochester and writer of The French Canadians, a history of the economy of French Canada; Philip was a World War 2 soldier who earned a medal of honour from France.

The family moved from New York to New Canaan, Connecticut, after a physician made a recommendation for country living to help ten-year-old Wade's vision problems. She was also told not to read at all for a year, but she snuck books into trees she climbed and under her covers at night. She later attended a Sacred Heart boarding school in Greenwich, Connecticut.

== Education ==
She studied at Radcliffe College, then went on to graduate studies at St Anne's College of Oxford University. She considered English literature as a focus, but settled upon medieval history; her supervisor was Frederick Maurice Powicke. She wrote her thesis about Simon Montfort.

== Career and later personal life ==
She married a Canadian she had met at Oxford, Raymond Labarge, who was there studying law. They moved to Canada, and she spent most of her later years in Ottawa, where the couple had two daughters and two sons. She became a patriotic Canadian, and renounced her US citizenship. She wrote nine books about history, mostly focusing on the lives of women in medieval times. Her husband was named deputy minister of customs and excise in the National Revenue Ministry; he died when she was 55.

She wrote and lectured at Ottawa universities, while also expanding her volunteer work; she was named to the Order of Canada in 1982, with mention of her historical writing and her volunteer work with nurses and with the elderly. She became the first president of the Canadian Society of Medievalists in 1993.

She is best known her various books: A Baronial Household of the Thirteenth Century is about Eleanor, wife of Simon de Montfort, detailing the time while her husband was away at war; and Medieval Travellers: The Rich and the Restless is about Mary, daughter of Edward I of England, a peripatetic nun. Her most significant monograph was A Small Sound of the Trumpet: Women in Medieval Life, published in 1986. This was the first monograph devoted to the study of medieval women and it had a tremendous influence both popularly and in university classrooms.

She died on August 31, 2009.

== Selected works ==
- (1965) A Baronial Household of the Thirteenth Century
- (1968) Saint Louis: The Life of Louis IX of France, London.
- (1980) Gascony, England's First Colony 1204–1453. London: Hamish Hamilton
- (1982) Medieval Travellers: The Rich and the Restless, London: Hamish Hamilton
- (1986) A Small Sound of the Trumpet: Women in Medieval Life, London: Hamish Hamilton, ISBN 0-241-11809-3
- Simon de Montfort
- Henry V

== Sources ==
- In Memoriam Margaret Wade Labarge 1916-2009 Founding President of the Canadian Society of Medievalists /Société canadienne des médiévistes, written by Andrew Taylor, Florilegium 2010 27:1, v-xi.
- Obituary from the Globe and Mail
- "Canadian Who's Who 1997 entry". University of Toronto Press.
