= Mother Earth Living =

American lifestyle magazine

- Editor: Jean Denney
- Frequency: Bimonthly
- Total circulation: 55,000 (2011)
- First issue: May 1999
- Company: Ogden Publications
- Country: United States
- Based in: Topeka, Kansas
- Language: English
- Website: www.motherearthliving.com
- ISSN: 2159-7812
- OCLC: 700289635

Mother Earth Living (previously Natural Home & Garden) is an American bimonthly magazine about sustainable homes and lifestyle published by Ogden Publications. The headquarters is in Topeka, Kansas.

== Acquisition and rebranding ==
In 2012, Ogden Publications re-branded Natural Home & Garden as Mother Earth Living after the merger with the more popular magazine The Herb Companion and re-directed the domain naturalhomeandgarden.com to motherearthliving.com.

In 2006, Ogden Publications acquired Natural Home. Editor-in-chief Robyn Griggs Lawrence explained:

Natural Home started out in 1999 with a much stronger focus on building new homes with alternative materials such as straw bales and adobe, and technologies such as solar power. That focus was unique and cutting-edge — and there was no shortage of material to cover. Problem was, there just weren’t enough hip readers to make a sustainable magazine. After five years of circulation that’s barely reached six digits, the painful truth is that we now must reach beyond the boundaries of the eco-conscious consumer markets (Boulder, Berkeley, and Burlington), or we simply can’t afford to make the magazine anymore. From the beginning, our overarching mission has been to bring green, healthy homes and lifestyles to a mainstream audience; we have to be more accessible.

The magazine was revamped in 2005 and includes a column on eco-conscious money management, a "Try This" easy home projects section, and more articles on food, decorating, gardening, and remodeling.
