= Robert Daum (academic) =

Robert A. Daum is an American rabbi and professor. He is the founding Director of Iona Pacific Inter-religious Centre and Associate Professor of Rabbinic Literature and Jewish Thought at the Vancouver School of Theology.

Daum earned a PhD in Near Eastern Studies at the University of California, Berkeley, an MA in Hebrew Literature and Rabbinic Ordination at Hebrew Union College, and a BA magna cum laude at Tufts University. He held the Diamond Chair in Jewish Law and Ethics in the Department of Classical, Near Eastern, and Religious Studies at the University of British Columbia, where he currently holds an appointment as Honorary Associate Professor. He also is a Faculty Member at Green College at UBC, as well as being a Faculty Associate in the UBC Centre of Women's and Gender Studies.

In May 2011, Hebrew Union College – Jewish Institute of Religion awarded Daum the degree Doctor of Divinity honoris causa. At Simon Fraser University, he is a member of the Steering Committee of its Centre for Dialogue. He is a co-editor of, and a contributor to, The Calling of the Nations: Exegesis, Ethnography, and Empire in a Biblical-Historic Present (University of Toronto Press, 2011). His scholarly publications include articles in the journals Florilegium and The Jewish Quarterly Review. He has presented his research at universities in Canada, the United States, China, and Spain.
