= Florilegium (journal) =

- Discipline: History, Late Antiquity, Medieval studies
- Language: English
- Edited by: David Watt

Publication details
- History: 1979-present
- Publisher: University of Toronto Press on behalf of the Canadian Society of Medievalists (Canada)
- Frequency: Annual

Standard abbreviations
- ISO 4: Florilegium

Indexing
- ISSN: 0709-5201 (print); 2369-7180 (web)

Links
- Journal homepage

Florilegium, the journal of the Canadian Society of Medievalists / Société canadienne des médiévistes, is a quarterly "international, peer-reviewed academic journal concerned with the study of late Antiquity and the Middle Ages".

Originally titled Florilegium: Carleton University Annual Papers on Classical Antiquity and the Middle Ages, the journal was first published in 1979 under the co-editorship of Roger Blockley and Douglas Wurtele, and adopted as the Canadian Society of Medievalists's official journal in 1997.

Currently published by the University of Toronto Press on behalf of the Canadian Society, the journal accepts previously unpublished, "original scholarly research in all areas of late antique and medieval studies and especially welcomes papers [...] which take a cross-cultural or interdisciplinary approach to history, literature, or any other relevant area of study". Submissions, which may be in English or French, are subjected to double-blind peer-review.

== Abstracting and indexing ==
The journal is abstracted and indexed in:

- Annual Bibliography of English Language and Literature
- Base d'information bibliographique en Patristique/Bibliographic Information Base in Patristics
- Chaucer Bibliography Online
- EBSCO Electronic Journals Service
- Encomia
- Feminae: Medieval Women and Gender Index
- Google Scholar
- Humanities Source Ultimate
- International Medieval Bibliography
- ITER: Gateway to the Middle Ages and Renaissance
- MLA Directory of Periodicals
- Regesta Imperii
- Studies in the Age of Chaucer
- Ulrich's Periodicals Directory
