= Rob Daum =

Canadian ice hockey coach

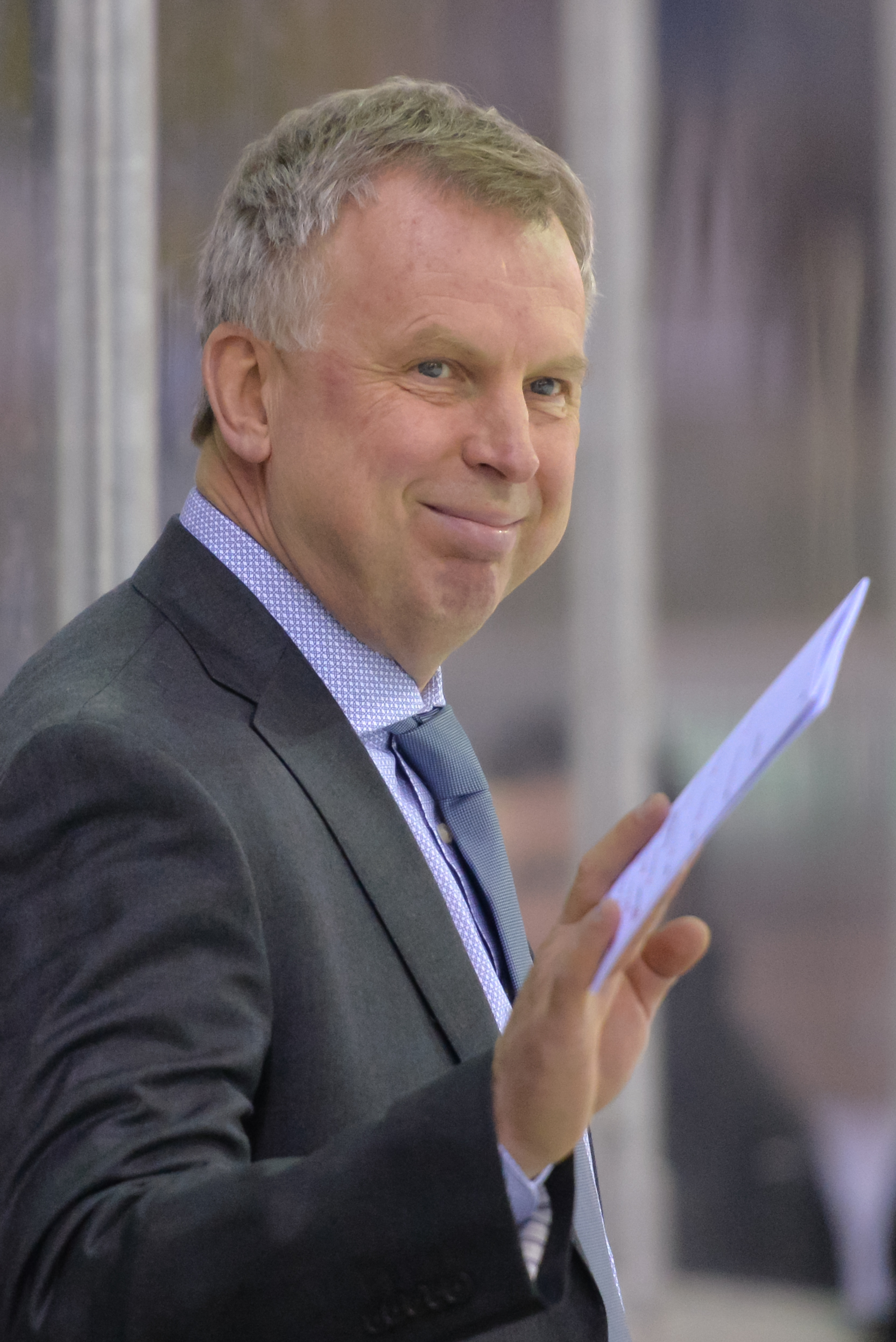
- Rob Daum in Austria, 2016
- Born: January 19, 1958 (age 68); Churchbridge, Saskatchewan, Canada
- Education: University of Alberta
- Occupation: Ice hockey coach

Robert "Rob" Daum (born January 19, 1958) is a Canadian ice hockey coach. He is currently the head coach for EC GRAND Immo VSV of the Austrian ICE Hockey League.

== Career ==
A 1983 graduate of the University of Alberta, Daum coached at the junior level in Alberta and Saskatchewan and was the head coach of the Nipawin Hawks in the 1980s, before working in different positions (head coach, assistant coach, general manager) for three teams of the Western Hockey League from 1989 to 1995.

In 1995, Daum was named head coach of the University of Alberta men's ice hockey team. During his 10-year tenure, he guided the Bears to three national championships and was named CIS Coach of the Year twice. Under Daum's tutelage, UAlberta also captured six Canada West championships. Daum was named Canada West Coach of the Year five times. He compiled an overall record of 345-81-32 (.788), and a 218-37-25 (.823) career Canada West record.

Daum was named head coach of the Houston Aeros of the American Hockey League (AHL) in August 2005. He parted ways with the team after two years.

During the 2007–08 NHL season, he was an assistant coach with the Edmonton Oilers of the National Hockey League, before serving as pro scout for the Oilers. In February 2009, he took over the head coaching job with Oilers' AHL affiliate Springfield Falcons, remaining in that job until the end of the 2009–10 season.

Daum accepted the head coaching job at EHC Linz of the Austrian Hockey League (EBEL) in 2011, guiding the team to the EBEL title his first year. He also led the Black Wings to EBEL semifinal appearances in 2014, 2015 and 2016. Daum parted ways with the Linz team at the conclusion of the 2016–17 season. On October 12, 2017, he took over the head coaching position with the Iserlohn Roosters of the German elite league DEL, replacing Jari Pasanen, who had been sacked.

== National team coaching ==
He guided Team Canada to a bronze medal at the 2003 University Games in Italy.

Daum also served as an assistant coach with Team Austria, and was with the team at the 2012, 2013 and 2014 IIHF World Championships, and at the 2014 Winter Olympics.

== Awards and honours ==
Award	Year
Father George Kehoe Memorial Award - CIS Coach of the Year	2000–01
Father George Kehoe Memorial Award - CIS Coach of the Year	2003–04
