= O-Ethyl methylphosphonothioic acid =

Chemical often used in the creation of harmful substances

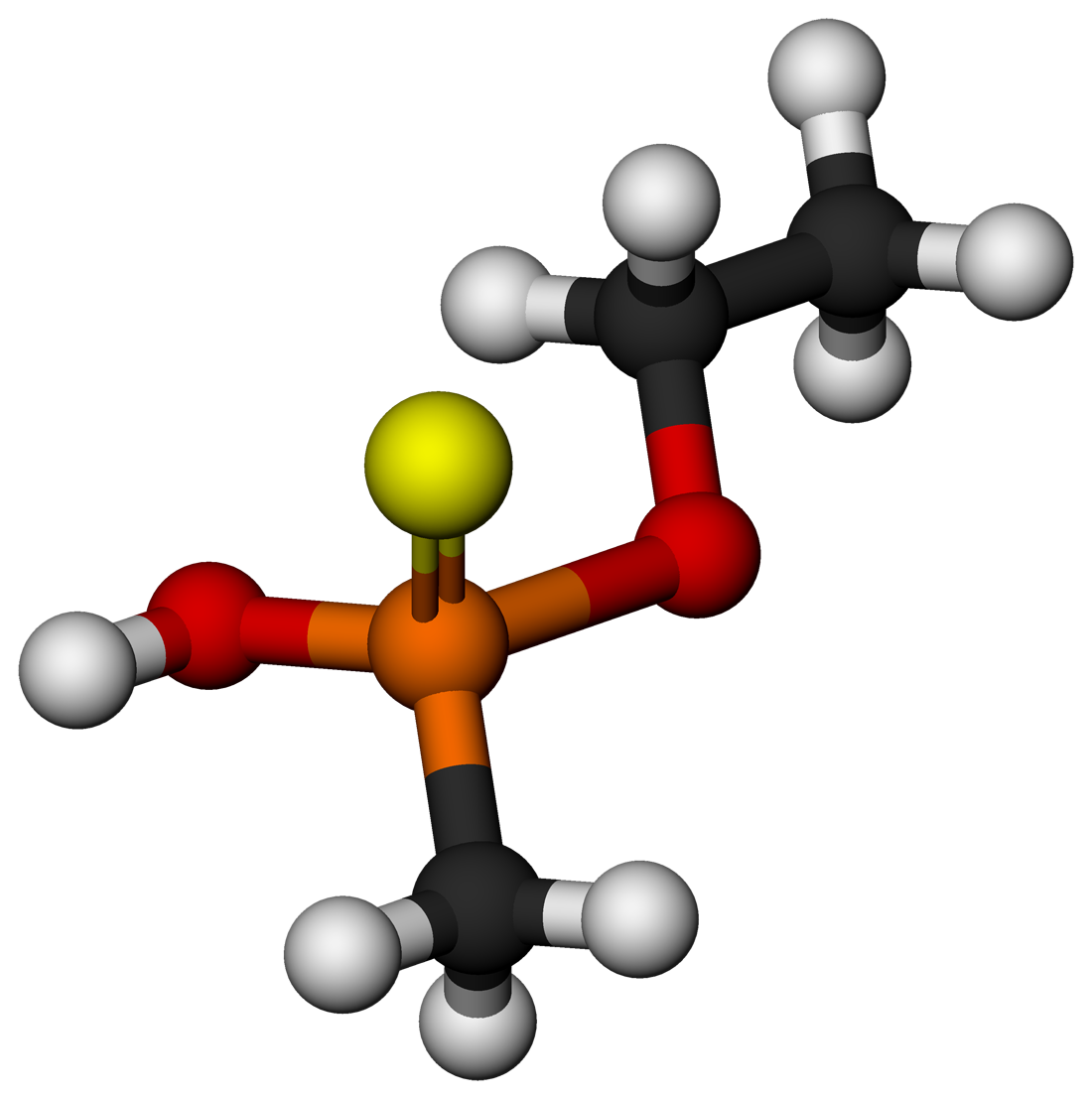

Names
- Preferred IUPAC name O-Ethyl hydrogen methylphosphonothioate
- Other names Methyl-phosphonothioic acid O-ethyl ester

Identifiers
CAS Number	18005-40-8
3D model (JSmol)	Interactive image
ChemSpider	483881
ECHA InfoCard	100.150.755
PubChem CID	556615
UNII	X7A0Q688ZP
CompTox Dashboard (EPA)	DTXSID50864811
- InChI: InChI=1S/C3H9O2PS/c1-3-5-6(2,4)7/h3H2,1-2H3,(H,4,7) Key: XXNRHOAJIUSMOQ-UHFFFAOYSA-N; InChI=1/C3H9O2PS/c1-3-5-6(2,4)7/h3H2,1-2H3,(H,4,7) Key: XXNRHOAJIUSMOQ-UHFFFAOYAH
- SMILES: S=P(O)(OCC)C

Properties
Chemical formula	C_{3}H_{9}O_{2}PS
Molar mass	140.14 g·mol^{−1}
- Except where otherwise noted, data are given for materials in their standard state (at 25 °C [77 °F], 100 kPa). verify (what is ?) Infobox references

O-Ethyl methylphosphonothioic acid (EMPTA) is an organophosphate compound. A dual-use chemical, it has constructive uses in the synthesis of pesticides and pharmaceuticals, and it is also a precursor in the synthesis of nerve agents such as Agent VM and Agent VX. The detection of EMPTA is cited as a major influence in the United States' 1998 decision to destroy the Al-Shifa pharmaceutical factory in Sudan.
