= Khalid ibn al-Walid training camp =

Afghan military training camp

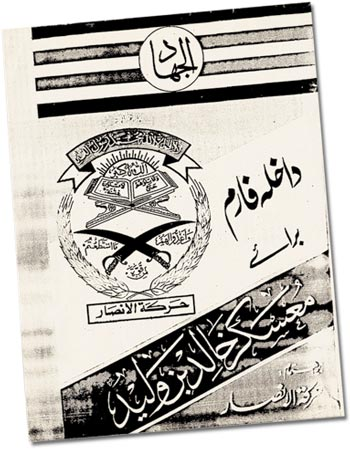
Application form from the Khalid bin Whalid training camp.

The Khalid Bin Whalid training camp was an Afghan training camp providing military training in the 1990s. Muslim convert Aukai Collins described his stay in the camp in 1993. Collins said he befriended Ahmed Omar Saeed Sheikh there. Sheikh was later convicted of a role in the kidnapping and murder of Daniel Pearl. Collins, on the other hand, attended the camp to prepare himself for aiding militant Chechen nationalists. He claimed that some of the camp's graduates, like him, attacked only legitimate military targets.

The Global Security reported that Jamal al-Fadl attended the camp in 1998, when it was run by Maktab al-Khidamat. They placed the camp in Khost Province, near Paktia Province.

In 1998, the camp was the target of a retaliatory attack by the United States, in response to the 1998 United States embassy bombings.

== See also ==
- Khalid bin Walid
