= Robert Daum (politician) =

German politician

Member of the Bundestag
- In office 6 October 1953 – 6 October 1957

Personal details
- Born: 8 January 1889 Elberfeld, Wuppertal
- Died: 6 May 1962 (aged 73)
- Party: SPD

Robert Daum (8 January 1889 – 6 May 1962) was a German politician of the Social Democratic Party (SPD) and former member of the German Bundestag.

== Life ==
In post-war Germany, he was a member of the North Rhine-Westphalia state parliament from 1946 to 1947, and of the Economic Council of the United Economic Area from 1948 to 1949. He sat in the 2nd German Bundestag from 1953 to 1957.

== Literature ==
Herbst, Ludolf; Jahn, Bruno (2002). Vierhaus, Rudolf (ed.). Biographisches Handbuch der Mitglieder des Deutschen Bundestages. 1949–2002 [Biographical Handbook of the Members of the German Bundestag. 1949–2002] (in German). München: De Gruyter - De Gruyter Saur. p. 1715. ISBN 978-3-11-184511-1.
