= MIT Enterprise Forum =

American nonprofit organization (1978–2021)

From 1978 to 2021 the MIT Enterprise Forum (MITEF) operated chapters in major cities in the U.S. and worldwide. The MIT Enterprise Forum was non-profit organization affiliated with the Massachusetts Institute of Technology (MIT) through MIT Technology Review. The chapters ran a range of events and programs targeted to help early-stage entrepreneurs, promote innovative technology to the general public. In the spring of 2021, MIT Technology Review, the parent and MIT Enterprise Forum, Inc (“Global”) notified the Chapters that MIT Technology Review decided to no longer support the Chapters of the MIT Enterprise Forum. In July 2021, the largest and flagship chapter of the MIT Enterprise Forum; the MIT Enterprise Forum of Cambridge subsequently renamed itself The eForum in order to continue its mission of helping early stage entrepreneurs succeed.

== History ==
In 1971, MIT Alumni John Jenkins '43 started the New York Venture Clinic. These events gathered MIT Alumni entrepreneurs monthly to present their business plans for feedback and advice to a large audience of alumni. In 1978, several other MIT Alumni in the Boston area were encouraged by Jenkins to create the first Chapter of the MIT Enterprise Forum, the MIT Enterprise Forum of Cambridge, which opened the group membership up to non-MIT alumni. Their small initial informal gatherings in Cambridge quickly grew to large (250+ attendee), open-to-all events sometimes known as the “10-250s” for the room in which they were held on the MIT Campus. In 1982, Aaron Kleiner '69 and Ray Kurzweil, who were involved with the MIT Enterprise Forum Cambridge, introduced the Startup Clinics, which provided a less intimidating small-group feedback sessions to early-stage startups. Early presenters included Bill Warner '80 founder of Avid Technology. In the late 90's MITEF Cambridge awarded Michael Dell the Edward B. Roberts Award for Distinguished Young Entrepreneurial Leadership

In subsequent years, the success of the New York and Cambridge chapters spawned more chapters of the MIT Enterprise Forum globally. With the mission to help early-stage technology entrepreneurs succeed faster by informing, connecting, and coaching them through relevant, practical workshops, mentoring programs, competitions, and networking events, the MIT Enterprise Forum has helped stimulate the founding and growth of thousands of companies all over the world.

In the spring of 2021, MIT Technology Review, the parent and MIT Enterprise Forum, Inc (“Global”) notified the Chapters that MIT Technology Review decided to no longer support the Chapters of the MIT Enterprise Forum.

The MIT Enterprise Forum of Cambridge renamed itself The eForum in July 2021. The organization remains a 501(c)3 serving early-stage entrepreneurs and the innovation community. As The eForum, they joined as a member of the Martin Trust Center for MIT Entrepreneurship whose mission is to advance knowledge and educate MIT students in innovation-driven entrepreneurship. This partnership allows The eForum to learn from their leadership in the field of entrepreneurship education and share it with the broader global community of innovation-driven entrepreneurs they serve. The MIT Enterprise Forum Central Coast rebranded in July 2021 as VENTECH to build connections with entrepreneurs in technology and beyond throughout the California Central Coast. The MIT Enterprise Forum of New York City closed down and Donated its cash reserves to the MIT Media Lab.
