= Paul R. Pillar =

American academic

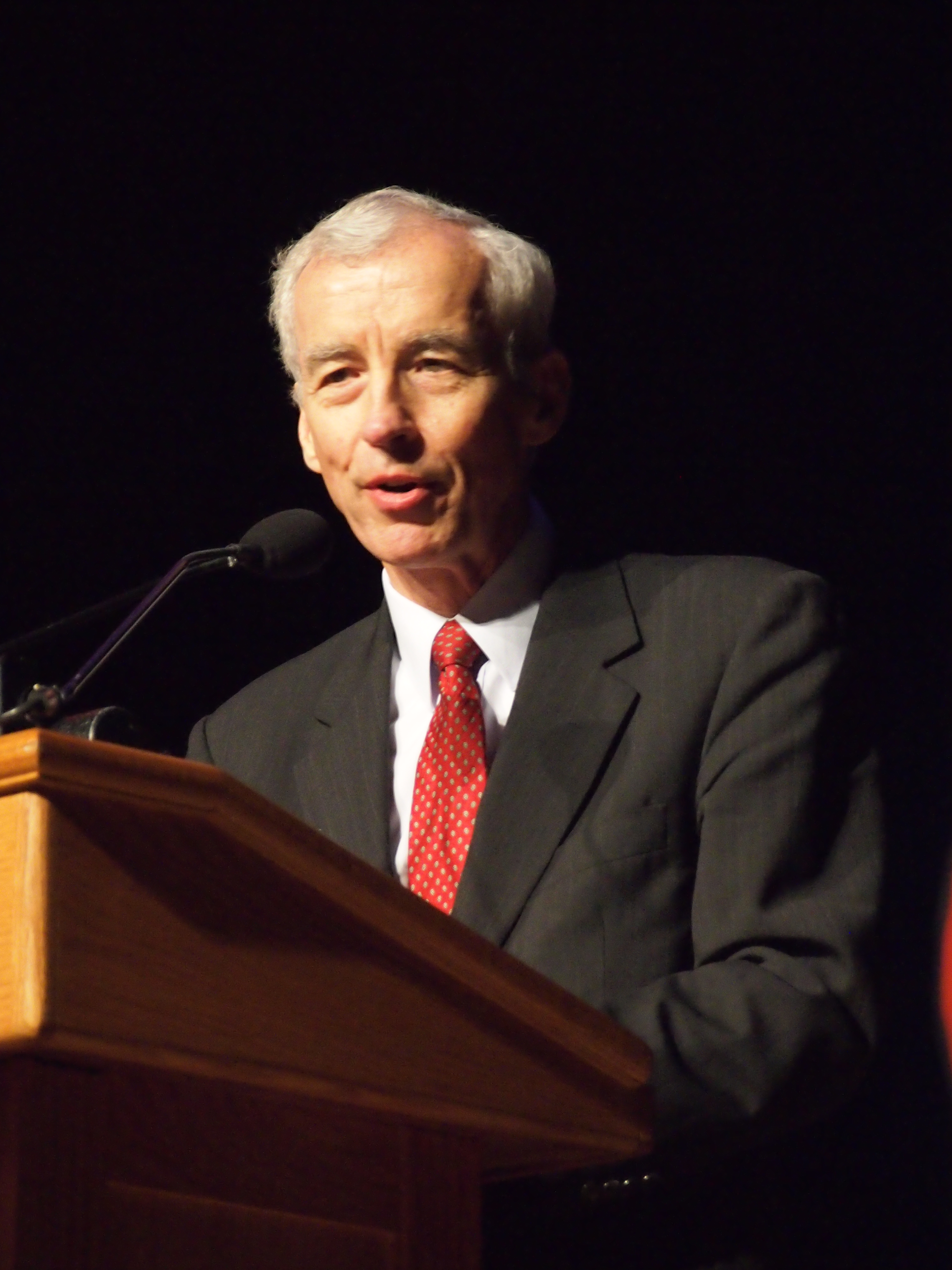
- Education: Dartmouth College, Oxford University, Princeton University
- Occupation: Center for Security Studies

Paul R. Pillar is an academic and 28-year veteran of the Central Intelligence Agency (CIA), serving from 1977 to 2005. He is now a nonresident senior fellow at Georgetown University's Center for Security Studies, as well as a nonresident senior fellow in the Brookings Institution's Center for 21st Century Security and Intelligence. He was a visiting professor at Georgetown University from 2005 to 2012. He is a contributor to The National Interest.

== Background ==
Pillar earned an A.B. degree from Dartmouth College (1969), and received the B.Phil from Oxford University (1971) and an M.A. and Ph.D. from Princeton University (1975 and 1978).

== Career ==
Prior to joining the CIA in 1977, Pillar served as a U.S. Army Reserve officer in Vietnam, on active duty from 1971 to 1973.

At the CIA, Pillar served in a variety of positions, including Executive Assistant to the Director of Central Intelligence, William H. Webster (1989–1991).

He became chief of analysis at the Agency's Counterterrorist Center (CTC) in 1993. By 1997, he was the Center's deputy director. But in the summer of 1999 he suffered a clash of styles with the new director, Cofer Black. Soon after, Pillar left the Center.

His 1990 and early 1991 experience were described in a 2006 interview, in which he spoke of the CIA role in assessing Iraq in preparation for the 1991 war. At that time, according to Pillar, the intelligence community judged that Iraq had active programs for development of weapons of mass destruction (WMD). "One of the revelations after the invasion and after the inspections began in Iraq was that some of those programs had gone farther than had been believed. The intelligence community had undershot, if you will, in its assessment of just how far along, especially on the nuclear program, the Iraqis had been". Pillar notes, "I did not receive any [intelligence] requests from a policy-maker on Iraq until about a year into the war ... policymakers decided "My goodness, this shows us how much we might not know." And as people like the vice president and others repeatedly reminded in the lead-up to the Operation Iraqi Freedom, "We don't know what we don't know." [said by Donald Rumsfeld]"

He was a Federal Executive Fellow at the Brookings Institution from 1999-2000. From 2000 to 2005, Pillar worked at the National Intelligence Council as the national intelligence officer for the Near East and South Asia, "responsible for production and coordination throughout the U.S. Intelligence Community of National Intelligence Estimates and other Community assessments". After December 2004, the National Intelligence Council, to which national intelligence officers report, moved from the CIA to the Office of the Director of National Intelligence.

== Observations and recommendations about Congressional oversight of intelligence ==
Paul Pillar, National Intelligence Officer for the Middle East between 2000 and 2005, wrote, in Foreign Affairs, "Intelligence affects the nation's interests through its effect on policy. No matter how much the process of intelligence gathering itself is fixed, the changes will do no good if the role of intelligence in the policymaking process is not also addressed ... But a few steps, based on the recognition that the intelligence-policy relationship is indeed broken, could reduce the likelihood that such a breakdown will recur."

He emphasized the need for "a clear delineation between intelligence and policy", suggesting that the United Kingdom sets an example "where discussion of this issue has been more forthright, by declaring once and for all that its intelligence services should not be part of public advocacy of policies still under debate. In the UK, Prime Minister Tony Blair accepted a commission of inquiry's conclusions that intelligence and policy had been improperly commingled in such exercises as the publication of the "dodgy dossier", the British counterpart to the United States' Iraqi WMD white paper". The National Intelligence Council, and its National Intelligence Officers, act as an intelligence "think tank", and routinely consult with experts outside government. Pillar has been criticized for leaking the NIC's advice to President George W. Bush in the course of such consultations.

Pillar suggested that an American equivalent of the issues "should take the form of a congressional resolution and be seconded by a statement from the White House. Although it would not have legal force, such a statement would discourage future administrations from attempting to pull the intelligence community into policy advocacy. It would also give some leverage to intelligence officers in resisting any such future attempts."

=== Inadequacies of current practice ===
Pillar criticized Congress both for not using the intelligence made available to it, as well as not necessarily asking questions about information not provided to them.

The proper relationship between intelligence gathering and policymaking sharply separates the two functions. ... Congress, not the administration, asked for the now-infamous October 2002 National Intelligence Estimate (NIE) on Iraq's unconventional weapons programs, although few members of Congress actually read it. (According to several congressional aides responsible for safeguarding the classified material, no more than six senators and only a handful of House members got beyond the five-page executive summary.) As the national intelligence officer for the Middle East, I was in charge of coordinating all of the intelligence community's assessments regarding Iraq; the first request I received from any administration policymaker for any such assessment was not until a year into the war.

While there is a CIA "politicization ombudsman", Pillar described the function as informally defined, and primarily listening to internal concern about politicization, and summarizing this for senior CIA officials. While he believes the intelligence oversight committees should have an important role, "the heightened partisanship that has bedeviled so much other work on Capitol Hill has had an especially inhibiting effect in this area".

=== Recommendation for improved legislative oversight ===
In the Foreign Affairs article, Pillar said that the legislative branch is the proper place for monitoring

... the intelligence-policy relationship. But the oversight should be conducted by a nonpartisan office modeled on the Government Accountability Office (GAO) and the Congressional Budget Office (CBO). Such an office would have a staff, smaller than that of the GAO or the CBO, of officers experienced in intelligence and with the necessary clearances and access to examine questions about both the politicization of classified intelligence work and the public use of intelligence. As with the GAO, this office could conduct inquiries at the request of members of Congress. It would make its results public as much as possible, consistent with security requirements, and it would avoid duplicating the many other functions of intelligence oversight, which would remain the responsibility of the House and Senate intelligence committees.

== Commentary by and about Pillar ==
There have been a series of press comments, for and against Pillar, starting before the 2004 United States Presidential election. Pillar also made several public speeches and publications. Pillar was still a National Intelligence Officer in 2004.

=== 2004 ===
Before the 2004 Presidential election, The Wall Street Journal editorial page criticized "CIA insurgents", including Pillar, for "engaging in a policy debate" and were "clearly trying to defeat President Bush and elect John Kerry". The piece asserted that Pillar had a "lousy track record" in assessing the terrorist threat and that he rejected the "war" metaphor for counterterrorism, comparing it instead to "the effort by public health authorities to control communicable diseases". The editorial also asserted that Pillar commented in a public lecture at Johns Hopkins University that "secular" Baathists in Iraq would never cooperate with fundamentalists like al-Qaeda. The editorial writer asserted, "Tell that to Abu Musab al Zarqawi and the Baathists now cooperating in Fallujah."

In September 2004, columnist Robert Novak wrote, "I reported on Sept. 27 that Paul R. Pillar, the CIA's national intelligence officer for the Near East and South Asia, told a private dinner on the West Coast of secret, unheeded warnings to Bush about going to war. I learned of this because of leaks from people who attended, but many other senior Agency officials were covertly but effectively campaigning for Sen. John Kerry." In response, Amy Sullivan of the Washington Monthly wrote that Pillar's remarks had been made at an off-the-record dinner party. Pillar had said, at the party, that the CIA had warned the White House, in January 2003, that war with Iraq "could unleash a violent insurgency in the country". Sullivan remarked that "Novak wasn't at the dinner, which was conducted under established background rules—the substance of Pillar's remarks could be reported, but not his identity or his audience. But someone there told Novak about it. So Novak, apparently feeling bound by no rules, outed Pillar by identifying him as the speaker. It's a trick he uses often—others attend off-the-record meetings or briefings, tell him about it, and he reports not just what was said, but fingers those who spoke as well."

In an October 2004 op-ed in the Washington Times, John B. Roberts II described Pillar is "a longstanding intellectual opponent of the policy options chosen by President Bush to fight terrorism". Roberts questioned Pillar's suitability to lead the writing of the NIE on Iraq, accusing him of disclosing, to academics and other nongovernmental personnel with whom the National Intelligence Council speaks, the advice given to President Bush.

Another critic of Pillar's speaking against Administration policy, focused around the dinner speech cited by Novak, suggested that CIA management, as a whole, might have been politicized against the Bush Administration. Observing that Pillar's speech was preapproved by CIA management, Stephen F. Hayes of the Weekly Standard questions why "A senior, unelected CIA official—Paul Pillar—was given agency approval to anonymously attack Bush administration policies less than two months before the November 2, 2004 presidential election ... His was not an isolated case; CIA officials routinely trashed Bush administration policy decisions, often with official approval, in the months leading up to the Iraq War and again before the election".

=== 2005 ===
Pillar was a major participant in a conference "sponsored by the John Bassett Moore Society of International Law, University of Virginia School of Law, and the Strategic Studies Institute (SSI), U.S. Army War College, and was held February 25–26, 2005. Conference participants included representatives from government agencies involved in the U.S. war on terrorism, students and faculty members from other universities". Pillar coauthored a monograph from SSI, entitled Law vs. War: Competing Approaches to Fighting Terrorism.

=== 2006 ===
In early 2006, Pillar wrote an article for Foreign Affairs criticizing the Bush Administration for cherry picking intelligence to justify the 2003 invasion of Iraq. He stated that the Administration went to war in Iraq "without requesting—and evidently without being influenced by—any strategic-level intelligence assessments on any aspect of Iraq. It has become clear that official intelligence was not relied on in making even the most significant national security decisions, that intelligence was misused publicly to justify decisions already made, that damaging ill will developed between [Bush] policymakers and intelligence officers, and that the intelligence community's own work was politicized".

Washington Post reporter Walter Pincus called Pillar's critique "one of the most severe indictments of White House actions by a former Bush official since Richard A. Clarke" and noted that this article was "the first time that such a senior intelligence officer has so directly and publicly condemned the administration's handling of intelligence".

Former UNSCOM weapons inspector Scott Ritter, writing on his blog in February 2006, agreed with Pillar's assessment of politicization, but suggested that Pillar had mixed motives in limiting "his criticism to the Bush administration during the time period leading up to the invasion in March 2003". Ritter criticized Pillar for not mentioning "the issue of regime change and the role played by the CIA in carrying out covert action at the instruction of the White House (both Democratic and Republican) to remove Saddam Hussein from power. Because he was the former national intelligence officer for Near East/Middle East affairs, I find this absence both disconcerting and disingenuous. By failing to give due credence to the impact and influence of the CIA's mission of regime change in Iraq on its analysis of Iraqi WMDs, Mr. Pillar continues to promulgate the myth that the CIA was honestly engaged in the business of trying to disarm Iraq".

In an interview with the Council on Foreign Relations, Pillar elaborated on the politicization of intelligence which he wrote about in his Foreign Affairs article. Pillar said that the Silberman-Robb commission did not go into as much depth on the "differential treatment that different draft intelligence assessments get as they go through the procedure of being coordinated and approved. And you have to remember, anything that sees light of day as a published—published in the sense of a classified paper—intelligence assessment goes through usually multiple levels of review, various supervisors, branch chiefs and so on, weighing in, approving or disapproving, remanding, forcing changes. That can be a speedy process or it can be a long, very torturous process". He said the Commission found that assessments that tended to justify a casus belli with Iraq went through approval faster than those that did not support war. Pillar agreed, but said the Commission also should have asked why this occurred. According to Pillar, "I think the most important reason, besides the overall mind-set that turned out to be erroneous, was the desire to avoid the unpleasantness of putting unwelcome assessments on the desks of policymakers".

=== 2007 ===
In 2007, Novak decried Pillar's alleged leaking to the media of portions of a National Intelligence Estimate he viewed as supporting his policy path, though he acknowledged that Pillar denied leaking the report. The New York Times editorial page defended Pillar, noting that the Bush administration did not even ask the CIA for an assessment of the consequences of invading Iraq until a year after the invasion.

When the administration did finally ask for an intelligence assessment, Mr. Pillar led the effort, which concluded in August 2004 that Iraq was on the brink of disaster. Officials then leaked his authorship to the columnist Robert Novak and to The Washington Times. The idea was that Mr. Pillar was not to be trusted because he dissented from the party line. Somehow, this sounds like a story we have heard before.

A Wall Street Journal op-ed criticized Pillar's choices in releasing information. Its author observed that "CIA officers on the cusp of retirement often enroll in a seminar that is supposed to help them adjust to life after the agency—teaching them, for example, how to write a résumé. I've begun to wonder if part of that program now includes a writing seminar on how to beat up on the Bush administration."

The author, Guillermo Christensen, agrees Pillar was central in the CIA's analysis of Iraq. Regarding the Foreign Affairs article, Christensen questions if that was the place to publicize that he thought the war was a bad idea and the President and advisors ignored him. He makes the assumption that But Pillar "actually did change his mind about all that work he'd done, and that he really did think the intelligence didn't support the case for war. If that was truly so, no one was better positioned to make the case against war within the government than Mr. Pillar himself". Christensen suggested that Pillar could have sent personal observations, with all relevant classified data, to senior Executive Branch officials. Further, Christensen suggested "that analysis with every single member of Congress by writing less-classified summaries of the conclusions, as is often done".

Thomas Joscelyn, in the Weekly Standard, wrote, "Pillar demonstrates that he himself is a master of the art of politicizing intelligence. Far from being a dispassionate analyst, Pillar practices the very same 'manipulations and misuse[s]' he claims to expose".

Joscelyn reasserted the conjecture that Saddam Hussein had a cooperative relationship with al-Qaeda. However, the official conclusions of investigations by the CIA, FBI, NSA, State Department, the Senate Select Committee on Intelligence, and the independent 9/11 Commission have all confirmed Pillar's view that there was no collaborative relationship between Saddam Hussein and al-Qaeda.

=== 2011 ===
Pillar's Intelligence and US Foreign Policy: Iraq, 9/11, and Misguided Reform was reviewed by Steve Coll in The New York Review of Books.

== Formal publications by Pillar ==
=== Books ===
Paul R. Pillar published another book titled: "Negotiating Peace: War Termination as a Bargaining Process" by Princeton University Press in 1983.

==== Terrorism and U.S. Foreign Policy ====
Pillar's interest in foreign policy resulted in a book Terrorism and U.S. Foreign Policy first published in 1999 and updated in 2004. The back cover of the book reads:

Terrorism and U.S. Foreign Policy is an essential guide to more effective coordination between conventional foreign policy and efforts to prevent terrorist attacks and activities. This paperback edition includes a new, extensive, and provocative post-9/11 introduction, along with the author's in-depth analyses of current terrorist threats, the status of terrorism in world politics, counterterrorism tools available to the United States, state sponsors of terrorism, and how best to educate the public about terrorist threats and counterterrorism.

A review of the book in Foreign Affairs says: "The book's strength is its nuanced sense of how Washington's counterterrorism policy actually works, day in and day out."

The Washington Times wrote: "[Pillar] offers a unique introspective of the breadth of radical islam and counterterrorism. ... Pillar's documentations involving the improvement of U.S. Homeland Security policy, such as observing the full range of capabilities of terrorist, as opposed to solely focusing on nuclear, biological or chemical warfare, and interrupting radical islamist operations worldwide, should be noted in the counterterrorism effort."

==== Intelligence and U.S. Foreign Policy ====
Pillar's interest in the relationship between intelligence and policy resulted in the 2011 book, Intelligence and U.S. Foreign Policy.

According to the publisher, "Pillar confronts the intelligence myths Americans have come to rely on to explain national tragedies, including the belief that intelligence drives major national security decisions and can be fixed to avoid future failures".

=== Articles and conference papers ===
Pillar emphasized that jihadist terror will continue to become more decentralized, but not wane, after the core of al-Qaeda is disrupted and pursued. with Al Qaeda waning, the larger terrorist threat from radical Islamists is not. Al Qaeda-inspired or trained groups will operate locally, and both ad hoc groups (e.g., the organization that had been led by Abu Musab al-Zarqawi, as well as established groups such as the Iraq-centered Ansar al-Islam and the Southeast Asian Jemaah Islamiya). Even while having local focus, they tend to share anti-Americanism. Individuals may operate with limited help from organizations.

In the past, ad hoc had been deprecated as a term for terrorist organizations, but that grows increasingly true. (See motivations of terrorists and a discussion of the nontraditional clandestine cell system used by such groups.)

Participating in a 2006 conference at the Royal Institute of International Relations, he analyzed and assessed the threat of jihadist terrorism on a worldwide basis. He described the threat as being generated by three complementary factors:

1. In any beliefs or similar movements, the most unfortunate and indiscreet are the ones that garner the most headlines. Until a more suitable ideology emerges, jihadism may stay as a major focus of radical Islamist activists.
2. It is energized by "energy from friction along the fault line between the Muslim world and the West." Themes causing friction including cultural imperialism, oppression of Muslims, and lack of respect for religion. Controversy accelerates polarization, as seen in the Danish disturbance over cartoons of the Prophet.
3. Social, economic and political conditions contribute to terrorism, but there is much confusion here. Pillar argues with those that claim poverty must not (typo ... original quote?) a claim because the 9/11 hijackers, and Bin Laden himself, is wealthy. He argues there is a difference between a lack of wealth that does not generate terrorism, and "frustrated ambition for economic and social advancement, which is." We hear, for example, that economic hardship must not be a root cause of jihadist terrorism because terrorists such as the 9/11 hijackers were not conspicuously poor, and the most prominent jihadist of all, bin Laden, is conspicuously wealthy. In like manner, he argues that authoritarianism is not a cause, because terrorist acts often happen in liberal democracies. And we hear that authoritarian politics must not have much to do with it either because jihadist terrorism takes place at least as often as anywhere else within liberal democracies, in places like New York, Madrid, or London. Pillar's explanation is that it is much easier to stage a terrorist attack in an open society than in the police states in the Middle East.

In an article in the March/April 2008 issue of Foreign Affairs, Pillar is critical of two recently published books on purported systemic failures of the intelligence community and the necessity for organizational reform. In an article in the January/February 2012 issue of Foreign Policy, Pillar similarly cites political leadership, not the intelligence community, for most errors of foresight in policy-making.
