= Jean-Louis Bruguière =

French judge

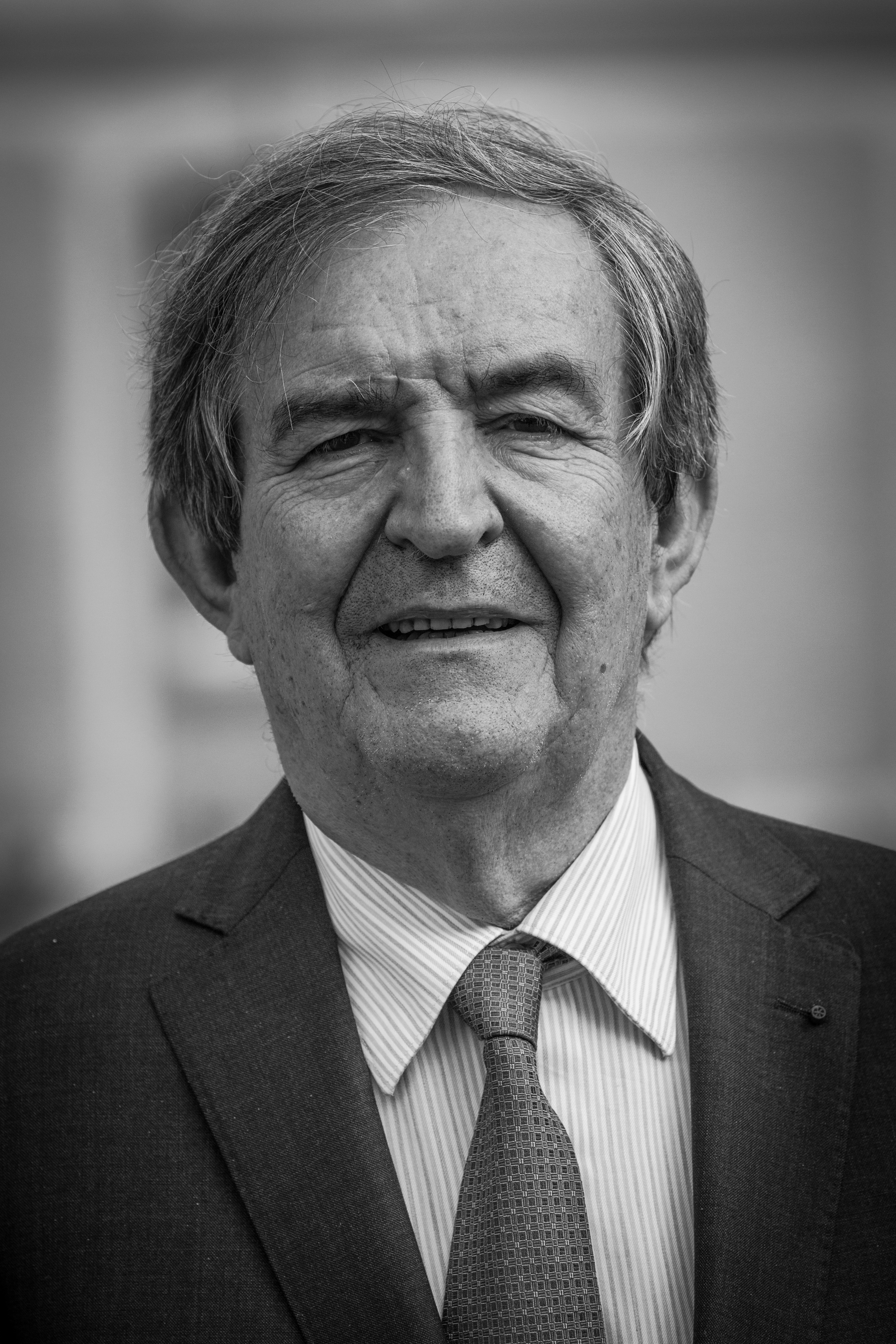
- Bruguière in 2014
- Born: 29 May 1943 (age 82); Tours, France
- Education: Sciences Po; French National School for the Judiciary
- Occupation: Magistrate

Jean-Louis Bruguière (French pronunciation: [ʒɑ̃ lwi bʁyɡjɛʁ]; born 29 May 1943) is a former leading French investigating magistrate in charge of counter-terrorism affairs. He was appointed in 2004 vice-president of the Tribunal de Grande Instance (Paris Court of Serious Claims). He has garnered controversy for various acts, including the indictment of Rwandan president Paul Kagame for the assassination in 1994 of Juvenal Habyarimana. Washington Post journalist Dana Priest has cited him as saying that he had in the past ordered the arrest of more than 500 suspects, some with the assistance of US authorities.

According to the investigative reporter, who described the workings of Alliance Base, a CTIC joint counter-terrorist operations center, involving the DGSE, the CIA and other foreign intelligence agencies, Bruguière declared that "[he had] good connections with the CIA and FBI." Bruguière has since temporarily left his judicial functions to dedicate himself to politics, joining Nicolas Sarkozy's Union for a Popular Movement (UMP) conservative party. However, he was appointed by the European Union at the US Department of Treasury to oversee the Terrorist Finance Tracking Program.

== Biography ==
The latest in a long line of magistrates (eleven generations), Bruguière studied at the Institut d'Etudes Politiques de Paris and took part in the May 1968 protests. He continued his education at the École Nationale de la Magistrature. Appointed to Évreux, he made himself known through an affair involving illegal vehicle registration cards by naming the police director as the culprit. Appointed to Paris in 1976, he began an attack on local pimps (in particular the Madame Claude network), eventually having to work under police protection.

In 1982 Bruguière declared accused Japanese cannibal Issei Sagawa unfit to stand trial by reason of insanity and Sagawa was extradited from France to Japan where he was eventually released.

Following street gunfire in 1982, Bruguière turned himself towards anti-terrorism, expanding his network and targeting in particular the far-left group Action Directe. In 1986 an anti-terrorism division was formed in Paris. A year later his apartment was targeted in a grenade attack; Bruguière, however, continued his fight. In 1994, he tracked down and captured one of the world's most wanted terrorists, Carlos (the Jackal).

Possibly his biggest case (in terms of number of people involved) was that of UTA Flight 772 which was sabotaged over the Sahara Desert in 1989 with the loss of 170 lives. Bruguière was instrumental in having six Libyans prosecuted in Paris and convicted in absentia. However, in the 2001 book Manipulations Africaines, he was accused by the French journalist Pierre Péan of having deliberately ignored evidence pointing to Lebanon, Syria and Iran in order to put the blame on Libya.

He was also instrumental behind the controversial 1998 mass trial of 138 suspected members of the "Chalabi network" that supported the Armed Islamic Group (GIA) during the Algerian Civil War.

Bruguière counselled Italian senator Paolo Guzzanti (Forza Italia), in charge of the Mitrokhin Commission, endorsing the old thesis, once supported by the CIA, according to which the Soviet Union was behind Mehmet Ali Agca's 1981 assassination attempt on Pope John Paul II. The Mitrokhin Commission has been discredited following a manipulation by a network to defame Prime minister Romano Prodi and other political opponents of Berlusconi, by claiming they worked for the KGB. The network included Mario Scaramella, arrested in December 2006, the head of SISMI Nicolò Pollari, n°2 of SISMI Marco Mancini (both indicted in the Abu Omar case), as well as Robert Seldon Lady, CIA station chief in Milan, also indicted in the Imam Rapito affair.

He was called as a witness in May 2007 by the defendants of a trial involving members suspected to have provided logistical support to the Moroccan Islamic Combatant Group (GICM), involved in the 2003 Casablanca bombings. He had been in charge of the investigations concerning this case, and the defendants' lawyer questioned his methods.

He sits on the Board of Advisors of the Chertoff Group, headed by Michael Chertoff.

=== Rwanda ===
His controversial report into the April 1994 assassination of then-Rwandan President, Juvénal Habyarimana and his counterpart Cyprien Ntaryamira of Burundi, was made public on 17 November 2006. Brugière has indicted Paul Kagame, current President of Rwanda and leader of the FPR, claiming that Kagame assassinated Habyarimana to provoke the genocide against his own ethnic group, in order to take power. Bruguière's thesis has both been very controversial and criticised by Le Figaro, Libération and other newspapers. His investigations are based on two oral sources, Abdul Ruzibiza, a former member of the Rwandan Patriotic Front who lives in exile, and Paul Barril, who was in charge of François Mitterrand's wiretap section at the Elysee Palace and had an obscure role in Rwanda before 1994.

Le Figaro points the international dimension of the character and his contacts with intelligence agents, both in Russia and in the United States, cited justice colleagues of Bruguière, who criticize him for "favourizing the raison d'état over the law." Bruguiere's findings about the death of Habyarimana later were contradicted by the more exhaustive and documented investigation for the Cour d'Appel de Paris, Tribunal de Grande Instance de Paris by Magistrates Natalie Poux and Marc Trevidic, which found that the missile that downed his plane came from the Presidential Guard camp, Kanombe, where European military cooperation officers were lodged.

=== Political career ===
Bruguière left his civil function as a magistrate and provided his support, in March 2007, to the right-wing candidate Nicolas Sarkozy for the presidential election. He then presented himself as candidate under the joint appellation Union for a Popular Majority (UMP, Sarkozy's party)-Parti Radical Valoisien, in the third circonscription of the Lot-et-Garonne department, for the June 2007 legislative elections. Bruguière was defeated by his Socialist competitor, Jérôme Cahuzac, gaining only 41,71% at the second round against 52,29% for Cahuzac.

=== Investigating alleged corruption at PACE ===
In late May 2017, Bruguière was appointed a member of the independent external investigation body to look into allegations of corruption within the Parliamentary Assembly of the Council of Europe (PACE).

== Honours ==
- Officer of the Legion of Honour (France)
- Commander of the National Order of Merit (France)
- (Spain) Silver Medal of the Spanish Guardia Civil
- (Spain) Dialogo prize (2007)

== Memoirs ==
- Jean-Louis Bruguière Les voies de la Terreur, Fayard 2016 ISBN 978-2-213-68229-7
