= Guido Salvini (judge) =

Italian judge, based in Milan (born 1954)

Guido Salvini (born 1953) is an Italian judge, based in Milan. He issued European arrest warrants in 2005 against approximately 20 CIA agents accused of having taken part in the abduction of Abu Omar, the Egyptian cleric in Milan in 2003. The case is known in Italy as the Abu Omar case. Before that, Guido Salvini was in charge of investigations, since July 1988, concerning Italy's strategy of tension during the 1970s.

== 2000s ==
According to Rome prosecutor Pietro Salvitti, quoted by La Repubblica, Guido Salvini was one of the targets of a "network" which aimed at slandering various political opponents of Silvio Berlusconi via the Mitrokhin Commission, headed by senator Paolo Guzzanti, by claiming they worked for or were manipulated by the KGB, the former intelligence agency of the Soviet Union, dissolved in 1991. These targets included former Prime Minister Romano Prodi, his staff, General Giuseppe Cucchi (current director of the CESIS), Milan prosecutor Armando Spataro, also in charge of the "Imam Rapito" case, as well as La Repubblica reporters Carlo Bonini and Giuseppe D'Avanzo, who discovered the Yellowcake forgery manipulations. This network includes, according to Salvitti, Mario Scaramella, Nicolò Pollari, head of SISMI intelligence agency indicted in the Imam Rapito affair, Marco Mancini, n°2 of SISMI arrested in July 2006 for the same reason, as well as Robert Lady, CIA station chief in Milan also indicted in the kidnapping of Abu Omar in Milan.

== Strategy of tension ==
Guido Salvini started investigating events relating to Italy's strategy of tension, which have involved a NATO stay-behind network known as Gladio, in July 1988. After 463 interrogations, the investigations produced 60,000 pages. He indicted in 1998 David Carrett, an officer of the US Navy, on charges of political and military espionage as well as participation in the 1969 Piazza Fontana bombing. He also indicted Sergio Minetto, an Italian official member of Gladio, and pentito Carlo Digilio, indicted in the Piazza Fontana investigation. The neofascists had decided to kill Mariano Rumor, in retaliation against his decision not to proclaim the state of emergency following the Piazza Fontana bombing — which, according to neo-fascist Vincenzo Vinciguerra, was one of the main objectives of this bombing.
