= Mitrokhin Commission =

Italian parliamentary commission set up in 2002

The Mitrokhin Commission was an Italian parliamentary commission set up in 2002 to investigate alleged KGB ties of some Italian politicians. Set up by the Italian Parliament, then led by Silvio Berlusconi's centre-right coalition, the House of Freedoms, and presided by Paolo Guzzanti (senator of Forza Italia), its focus was on alleged KGB ties to opposition figures in Italian politics, basing itself on the Mitrokhin Archive, which was controversial and viewed with scepticism, and various other sources including the consultant Mario Scaramella. The Mitrokhin Commission alleged, among other things, that Romano Prodi, former centre-left Prime Minister of Italy and President of the European Commission from 1999 to 2004, was the "KGB's man in Italy".

The commission was disbanded in March 2006, without any concrete evidence given to support the original allegations of KGB ties to Italian politicians. In five years, the commission had heard 47 witnesses, for a total cost of 1.9 million euros. Scaramella was arrested in late December 2006 and charged with libel and illegal weapons' trade, with wiretaps of phone calls between Scaramella and Guzzanti published by the Italian press in late 2006, showing that the two planned to discredit various political opposition figures by claiming ties with the KGB. The 2006 Italian general election, held on 9–10 April, was won by Prodi's centre-left coalition, The Union. In November 2006, the new Italian Parliament instituted a commission to investigate the Mitrokhin Commission for allegations that it was manipulated for political purposes.

== Members of the commission ==
The inter-parliamentary commission was composed by the following twenty senators and twenty deputies: the Senate president Paolo Guzzanti; the vice-presidents Andrea Papini and Giovanni Mongiello; the secretaries Giampaolo Zancan and Salvatore Meleleo; the senators Giulio Andreotti, Guglielmo Castagnetti, Mario Cavallaro, Amedeo Ciccanti, Cinzia Dato, Luciano Falcier, Costantino Garraffa, Mario Gasbarri, Lauro Salvatore, Loris Giuseppe Maconi, Lucio Malan, Luigi Marino, Franco Mugnai, Gianni Nieddu, Lodovico Pace, Piergiorgio Stiffoni, Roberto Ulivi; and the deputies Ferdinando Adornato, Gabriele Albonetti, Maurizio Bertucci, Valter Bielli, Francesco Carboni, Fabrizio Cicchitto, Giuseppe Cossiga, Oliviero Diliberto, Lino Duilio, Giuseppe Fallica, Vincenzo Fragalà, Pierfrancesco Gamba, Francesco Giordano, Giuseppe Lezza, Giuseppe Molinari, Erminio Quartiani, Enzo Raisi, and Giacomo Stucchi.

== Allegations ==
Allegations of KGB ties, which were denied and ruled defamatory in nature in court, included Prodi as the alleged "KGB's man in Italy", his staff, Massimo D'Alema, Alfonso Pecoraro Scanio, General Giuseppe Cucchi (later director of the CESIS), Milan's judges Armando Spataro, and Guido Salvini, both in charge of the Abu Omar case, as well as La Repubblica reporters Carlo Bonini and Giuseppe D'Avanzo, who broke the Niger uranium forgeries. This latter affair refers to falsified classified documents provided by the Italian SISMI to United States intelligence. These forgeries depicted an attempt by the regime of Iraq's Saddam Hussein to purchase uranium, in the form of yellowcake, from Niger during the Iraq armament crisis, and was part of the rationale for the Iraq War cited by the George W. Bush administration to support the 2003 invasion of Iraq.

=== "Bulgarian connection" claim ===
Guzzanti revived the old "Bulgarian connection" thesis concerning Mehmet Ali Ağca's 1981 attempted assassination of Pope John Paul II. He stated in the draft of the report, without providing evidence to back his claim, that "leaders of the former Soviet Union were behind the assassination attempt", alleging that "the leadership of the Soviet Union took the initiative to eliminate Pope John Paul" because of his support for Solidarity, the Polish trade-union, relaying "this decision to the military secret services" and not the KGB. According to Frank Brodhead, the new conclusions brought by Guzzanti were based on the same information provided in the early 1980s by Michael Ledeen, an American neoconservative author tied to the SISMI and Ağca himself, which he said is "bogus at best and at worst deliberately misleading". The "Bulgarian connection" thesis was debunked by Francesco Pazienza, a member of Propaganda Due, cited in a 1987 article in The Nation, as well as by media analyst Edward S. Herman in 1986: The Rise and Fall of the Bulgarian Connection. Pazienza stated that Ledeen "was the person responsible for dreaming up the 'Bulgarian connection' behind the plot to kill the Pope." Ledeen admitted to the Vanity Fair to having been paid $10,000 by the SISMI in 1979 or 1980, allegedly on extradition matters with the United States.

The Washington Post reporter Michael Dobbs, who had initially believed this conspiracy theory, later wrote that "the Bulgarian connection was invented by Ağca with the hope of winning his release from prison. He was aided and abetted in this scheme by right-wing conspiracy theorists in the United States and William J. Casey's Central Intelligence Agency (CIA), which became a victim of its own disinformation campaign." Guzzanti said that the commission had decided to re-open the report's chapter on the assassination attempt in 2005, after the Pope wrote about it in his last book, Memory and Identity: Conversations Between Millenniums. The Pope wrote that he was convinced the shooting was not Ağca's initiative and that "someone else masterminded it and someone else commissioned it".

Guzzanti's claims in the draft report were based on recent computer analysis of photographs that purported to demonstrate suspected conspirator Sergei Antonov's presence in St Peter's Square during the shooting and on information brought by the French anti-terrorist judge Jean-Louis Bruguière, a controversial figure whose last feat was to indict Rwandese president Paul Kagame, on the grounds that he had deliberately provoked the 1994 Rwandan genocide against his own ethnic group in order to take the power. According to Le Figaro, Bruguière, who was in close contacts with both Moscow and Washington, D.C., including the CIA and the Federal Bureau of Investigation, was accused by many of his colleagues of "privileging the raison d'état over law".

In its final report, issued on 15 March 2006, the Mitrokhin Commission mentioned on page 248 that Bruguière during the course of his investigations allegedly gained information, indicating that the assassination attempt on Pope John Paul II was orchestrated by the GRU, the foreign military intelligence agency of the former Soviet Union. Bruguière's information supporting the "Bulgarian connection" in the attempted assassination allegedly sprang from the prosecution of Ilich Ramirez Sanchez, alias Carlos the Jackal, held in France since his capture in Sudan in 1994. Both Russia and Bulgaria condemned the report. Foreign ministry spokesman Dimiter Tzantchev said: "For Bulgaria, this case closed with the court decision in Rome in March 1986." He recalled the Pope's comments dismissing those allegations during his May 2002 visit to Bulgaria.

== Analysis of the allegations ==
In an interview published in La Repubblica in November 2006, former KGB agent Yevgeny Limarev told how the working group of the commission purpose was to find connections between Italian political left exponents and KGB or Russia's Federal Security Service, presumably for political purpose. Asked about targeted persons, he said: "Without a doubt, the first name on the list was that of Prodi, especially during the period preceding the spring elections. ... Prodi was a real obsession, in spite of the fact that nothing ever came out on your Prime Minister." In a rebuke to the original Mitrokhin Commission's authenticity, Vasili Mitrokhin himself refused to meet the commission's members before his death.

On 1 December 2006, several Italian newspapers published interceptions of telephone calls between Guzzanti and Scaramella, who was the commission's consultant and became involved in the events surrounding the death of former KGB agent Alexander Litvinenko in Great Britain on 23 November 2006. In the interceptions, Guzzanti declared that the Mitrokhin Commission's unstated goal was to depict Prodi and Alfonso Pecoraro Scanio, leader of the Federation of the Greens and then minister of environment in second Prodi government, as "agents of the KGB" financed by Moscow in order to discredit him. In these interceptions, the two men also discussed plans to claim that Antonio Bassolino, president of the Campania region, was linked to the Camorra. According to the Corriere della Sera, these interceptions demonstrated that Scaramella was in contact with Italian police agents, penitentiary police agents, and two CIA agents, one of them being Robert Seldon Lady, former CIA station chief in Milan, indicted by prosecutor Armando Spataro for having coordinated the 2003 abduction of Hassan Mustafa Osama Nasr in Milan, a case of extraordinary rendition that gave rise to the Abu Omar case.

According to the interceptions, Scaramella was to collect false witnesses among KGB refugees in Europe to support this aim. He was arrested at the end of December 2006 on charges of calumny and illegal weapons' trade. The investigation showed that Scaramella received some of his information from Litvinenko. Scaramella was then an obscure figure, of whom the International Herald Tribune wrote that "a slew of media reports about him and his career here — which included trying to prove that some top Italian center-left politicians, including Prime Minister Romano Prodi, are Russian spies — have invariably included unflattering adjectives. They include: 'incurable liar', 'wannabe 007', 'braggart', 'bumbler' and 'swindler' — not to mention 'fool' and 'mental case'." His repeated offers to collaborate with the Italian secret services were all rejected in the 1990s by the Italian government. From 2003 to 2006, he worked for the Mitrokhin Commission. When a left-wing member of the commission questioned his credentials, he promptly remade one.

Cited by La Repubblica, according to the investigations of Rome prosecutor Pietro Salvitti, who indicted Scaramella, Nicolò Pollari, head of SISMI indicted in the Abu Omar case, as well as SISMI no. 2, Marco Mancini, who was arrested in July 2006 for the same reason, were some of the informers, alongside Scaramella, of Guzzanti. According to Salvitti, neside targeting Prodi and his staff, this network, also aimed at defaming General Giuseppe Cucchi (the then director of the CESIS), Milan's judges Armando Spataro, in charge of the Abu Omar case, and Guido Salvini, as well as La Repubblica reporters Carlo Bonini and Giuseppe D'Avanzo, who broke the Yellowcake forgery scandal and the SISMI-Telecom affair, in which Marco Mancini, no. 2 of the SISMI already indicted in the Abu Omar case, was arrested by the end of 2006. The investigation also showed a connection between Scaramella and the CIA, in particular through Filippo Marino, one of Scaramella's closest partners since the 1990s and co-founder of the Environmental Crime Prevention Program, which was described as an empty shell according to the International Herald Tribune. Marino, who was living in the United States, acknowledged in an interview an association with former and active CIA officers, including Robert Seldon Lady, the former CIA station chief in Milan.

== Closure and creation of a new commission ==
The Mitrokhin Commission was shut down in March 2006 without any concrete result provided, and not one political figure was exposed by the allegations, despite months of press speculation alimented by Berlusconi family newspaper Il Giornale. Following the 2006 general election and the nomination of Prodi as head of the new government, a parliamentary commission was instituted to investigate about this controversial Mitrokhin Commission.
