= Sabrina De Sousa =

Portuguese-American CIA operative

Sabrina de Sousa
- Born: 1956 (age 69–70); Goa, Portuguese India
- Conviction: Kidnapping

Sabrina de Sousa (born 1956) is a Portuguese-American ex-CIA operative convicted (in absentia) of kidnapping. In 2009 she was convicted of kidnapping in Italy for her role in the 2003 abduction of the Muslim imam Abu Omar, who was kidnapped in Milan and subsequently tortured. Sousa was sentenced to four years in prison for her role in the kidnapping. A European Arrest Warrant valid throughout Europe was subsequently issued for her arrest, and she was arrested in Portugal under that arrest warrant in 2015. She was due to be extradited back to Italy to serve her sentence, having exhausted her appeal rights against her extradition in Portugal, when the President of Italy commuted her sentence, ending extradition proceedings against her, in February 2017. She was still due to serve community service when she left Italy for the US in October 2019 citing fears for her safety.

In 2009, Sousa sued the U.S. State Department, claiming that the State Department should grant her diplomatic immunity for her role in the kidnapping. The State Department denied that she had diplomatic immunity, and she lost her lawsuit against the State Department. In a July 27, 2013, interview with the McClatchy News Service, she said that she worked undercover for the CIA when the kidnapping took place. She maintains she played no role in the kidnapping, was unaware of the plans, and was on a ski trip when it took place.

== Background ==
Sousa was born in Goa, Portuguese India, and grew up in Mumbai, India. She is a citizen of Portugal and the United States, having obtained her U.S. citizenship in 1985.

== Role in the kidnapping and torture of Abu Omar ==
The underlying case is called the "Abu Omar case" or the "Imam Rapito affair". Abu Omar, also known as Hassan Mustafa Osama Nasr and Osama Moustafa Hassan Nasr, is a Muslim cleric, who on February 17, 2003, was abducted by the CIA, transported to the Aviano Air Base, from which he was transferred to Egypt, where he was interrogated (and allegedly tortured). The case involves "kidnapping charges in Italy for the seizure of a suspected terrorist." The Italian government originally denied having played any role in the abduction, but Italian prosecutors Armando Spataro and Ferdinand Enrico Pomarici indicted two dozen American and Italian government employees and agents.

One of those were Sousa. She is not alleged to have kidnapped Omar herself, but is said to have "helped make false documents to mislead investigators." Italian authorities issued an arrest warrant in 2006 for Sousa. They named her publicly in July 2008. She claims an alibi that she was "vacationing at a ski resort nearly 130 miles away in Madonna di Campiglio, Italy."

Sousa is alleged by the Italian judicial system to be an intelligence officer. They claim that she is part of a "CIA network", serving under diplomatic cover. She claims to be a diplomat. She was registered with the United States Embassy in Rome as a Second Secretary, but posted in Milan. She was a State Department employee, until she resigned in February 2009.

She was convicted of kidnapping for her role in the Imam rapito affair on November 4, 2009, by an Italian court, after a trial in absentia and a plea of not guilty.

She was detained at the Lisbon airport in Portugal on October 5, 2015 and her passport confiscated, based on an outstanding warrant from her 2009 conviction. In January 2016, she was ordered extradited to Italy to serve her sentence. De Sousa appealed the ruling; working to clear her name, including writing a memoir about her activities, she disclaimed any involvement in the affair. On April 11, 2016, her appeal was denied by the Portuguese Supreme Court, which upheld the extradition order.

De Sousa filed a further appeal to Portugal's Constitutional Court, based on the difference between how Portugal and Italy handle convictions in absentia (she could not count on Italy granting her a re-trial, whereas a right to a re-trial is routinely allowed in Portugal) according to the New York Times. On 8 June 2016, the Portuguese Constitutional Court upheld the Supreme Court's decision. Sabrina de Sousa was due to be extradited to Italy at that time.

=== Lawsuit ===
Sousa sued for a declaration that she is a diplomat with immunity from prosecution:

In the lawsuit filed Wednesday (May 2009) in federal court in Washington, Sabrina De Sousa wants diplomatic immunity and government-funded legal counsel in Italy. She claims she was a foreign service officer working in Milan and was not involved in the 2003 seizure of Muslim cleric Osama Moustafa Hassan Nasr, also known as Abu Omar. But Italian prosecutors say De Sousa, a 53-year-old India native, was a CIA officer working under diplomatic cover and was one of four main U.S. officials responsible for coordinating Omar's capture from a Milan street in broad daylight on February 17, 2003.

— AP story

De Souza tried to appeal her extradition on the grounds that the CIA had documents that would establish she did not play the roles in the kidnapping for she was convicted, but that the documents were unavailable for her to use to defend herself, because they were classified as secrets.

=== Extradition ===
De Souza eventually lost all her appeals against extradition. In an email to the Associated Press De Souza's lawyers wrote that Portuguese authorities took her into custody on February 20, 2017, and that she would be transferred to Italian custody within a few days.

On February 28, 2017, Sergio Mattarella, the President of Italy, commuted Sousa's sentence, to just three years. Italian law allows convicts sentenced to 3 years or less to serve an alternate sentence under house arrest, in lieu of incarceration. De Sousa's initial sentence had been 7 years having previously been reduced to 4 years.

After Mattarella's partial commutation, Italian prosecutors revoked their extradition order. De Sousa had expressed confidence that, when inaugurated Donald Trump would save her from imprisonment leading to speculation Italy had succumbed to diplomatic pressure from the new administration.

In October 2019, Sousa left Italy for the U.S. claiming "she fears for her safety".

== See also ==
- Jeffrey W. Castelli
- Robert Seldon Lady
- Nicolò Pollari
- Marco Mancini
