= Counterterrorist Intelligence Center =

A Counterterrorist Intelligence Center (CTIC) is, according to a The Washington Post November 18, 2005 front page article by Dana Priest, a counterterrorist operations center run jointly by the Central Intelligence Agency and foreign intelligence services as part of the US "war on terror".

== Description of CTIC ==
According to Dana Priest's article, on which the CIA declined to comment at the time:

- CTICs exist in more than two dozen countries, including Uzbekistan, Indonesia (intelligence services headed by Lt. Gen. Abdullah Hendropriyono), France (see Alliance Base in Paris, which is headed by a DGSE French General and includes British, German, Canadian and Australian intelligence agencies).
- They are "financed mostly by the agency and employ some of the best espionage technology the CIA has to offer". They also have "computers linked to the CIA's central databases, and access to highly classified intercepts."
- They are used by the CIA and the foreign services to jointly "make daily decisions on when and how to apprehend suspects [of terrorism], whether to whisk them off to other countries for interrogation and detention, and how to disrupt al Qaeda's logistical and financial support."
- They are distincts from the CIA "black sites", or secret detention centers.

The CTIC were modeled on the CIA's counternarcotics centers in Latin America and Asia. In the 1980s the CIA persuaded these states to let it select individuals for the assignment, pay them and keep them physically separate from their own institutions. Officers from the host stations serving in the CTICs are vetted by the CIA, and usually supervised by the CIA's Chief of Station and augmented by officers sent from the Counterterrorist Center at Langley.

According to two intelligence officials interviewed by Dana Priest, "the first two CTICs were established in the late 1990s to watch and capture Islamic militants traveling from Saudi Arabia, Yemen, Egypt and Chechnya to join the fighting in Bosnia and other parts of the former Yugoslavia." The National Security Agency is a partner in the CTICs, and has established a Foreign Affairs Directorate that now handles sharing information and equipment with 40 countries.

CIA former director George Tenet convinced Yemenite president Ali Abdullah Saleh to work with the CIA. Tenet sent material and 100 Army Special Forces trainers to help Yemen create an antiterrorism unit after the 2001 invasion of Afghanistan. He also obtained the authorizations to fly Predator drones over Yemen. The CIA killed six al Qaeda operatives, including Abu Ali al-Harithi, suspected mastermind of the 2000 attack on the USS Cole, with such a drone, sent from the French military base in Djibouti.

== Alliance Base ==
In Paris, the Alliance Base is run by a General of the DGSE French intelligence agency, and gathers the CIA, the MI6, the BND, and Australian and Canadian intelligence agencies. It took part in the arrest of the German convert to Islam Christian Ganczarski, imprisoned in Fresnes Prison in Paris in June 2003. Investigative journalist Dana Priest referred to the Alliance Base in a July 3, 2005 article, and its existence was confirmed on 8 September 2006 by Christophe Chaboud, chief of the UCLAT ("Unité de Coordination de la Lutte contre le Terrorisme", "Fight against Terrorism Coordination Unit"), in an interview to RFI.

== Italy ==
Italy was not invited to participate in Alliance Base, allegedly because of jealousies between the SISMI and the SID. However, in the current Abu Omar case, the Milan magistrates have spoken of a "concerted CIA-SISMI operation." Former CIA responsible in Italy, Jeffrey W. Castelli, Milan station chief Robert Seldon Lady, as well as 24 others CIA officers, and head of SISMI Nicolò Pollari and his second Marco Mancini have been indicted in 2006 by the Italian justice for this affair.

== See also ==
- Alliance Base, a CTIC in Paris, France.
