= Camolin =

France-based secret counter-terrorism unit

Camolin, according to a 2004 report in the German magazine Der Spiegel, is a secret counter-terrorism unit based in Paris, France. The article states that the US, UK, Australia, Germany, and France - amongst others - created this unit after the 11 September 2001 attacks on the US. Started as Alliance Base in 2002, the unit is now codenamed Camolin.

Their greatest success to date seems to have been the arrest in France on 3 June 2003, of the German Muslim convert Christian Ganczarski who was considered at the time to be the head of Al Qaeda in Europe.

== Sources ==
- Summary of Der Spiegel article from Statewatch News Online
