= Joseph Romano =

Joseph Romano may refer to:

- Yossef Romano (1940–1972), Italian-born Israeli weightlifter
- Joseph L. Romano, officer in the United States Air Force
