= Geoff Morrell =

Geoff Morrell may refer to:

- Geoff Morrell (actor) (born 1958), Australian actor
- Geoff Morrell (spokesperson) (born 1968), former chief spokesman to the US Secretary of Defense
