= Rocco Martino =

Italian secret agent (born 1938)

Rocco Martino (born September 20, 1938) is an Italian secret agent. He was born in Tropea, province of Catanzaro.

On October 18, 2001, Pollari sent a one and a half page letter to the CIA indicating that "the news about Niger comes from a reliable source, even if it is not possible to assess its quality" (Italian: "le notizie sul Niger arrivano da una fonte affidabile, anche se non si è grado di valutarne la qualità").

During the summer of 2001, Alain Chouet and others with France's DGSE investigated an alleged deal later known as Nigergate in which Iraq was trying to obtain yellowcake from a country in Africa. By June 2002, they found out that the rumors were entirely false. Furthermore, in July 2002, the Italian SISMI and the United States CIA were informed by the French DGSE that Rocco Martino, a former Italian intelligence agent, was trying to pass fake documents about Iraq obtaining yellowcake from Niger. However, the SISMI report that a lady, who is controlled by SISMI's Antonio Nucera, in the Niger embassy at Rome presents the fake documents in July 2002. Later, in March 2003, George Tenet incorrectly stated that Iraq, which had large quantities of yellowcake, was obtaining yellowcake from Niger.

In late February 2002, Ambassador Joseph C. Wilson, husband of Valerie Plame and the last senior United States state department official to meet with Saddam Hussein, traveled to Niger and confirmed that the Niger-Gate documents were fake.

Martino played a major role in the fabrication and the dissemination of the Yellowcake Forgery, when he approached CIA Rome station chief Jeffrey W. Castelli with documents on Niger government letterhead describing secret plans for the sale of uranium to Iraq. Reportedly, Castelli dismissed the documents right off as forgeries, and never bothered passing them to Langley.

Although claiming to be an intelligence/disinformation conduit on his own account, it is likely Martino was deliberately deployed as a double agent by SISMI, Italian military intelligence, originally to spy on the French.

According to Nicholas Ruffard of the Sunday Times, Giacomo admitted that he received documents from the Nigerien embassy. Carlo Rossella, the editor of Panorama, had the documents during the third week of September 2002 and passed the documents to the American embassy in Rome on October 9, 2002. Elisabetta Burba was the author of an article about the documents which was never published in Panorama and was the person that gave the documents to the American embassy in Rome. Burba traveled to Niger and verified that the documents were fake. Although Michael Ledeen, who had been a frequent contributor to Panorama, allegedly was involved, Ledeen denied it. However, Philip Giraldi inferred to Scott Horton that Ledeen was involved and had received compensation. Vincent Cannistraro confirmed that Ledeen was involved with the forged documents. The Italian magazine Panorama was owned by Arnoldo Mondadori Editore which was controlled by the family of Italian prime minister Silvio Berlusconi.

On September 9, 2002, Nicolò Pollari gave the forged documents directly to Stephen Hadley, who was the United States deputy national security advisor.
