= Mario Scaramella =

Italian lawyer and security consultant (born 1970)

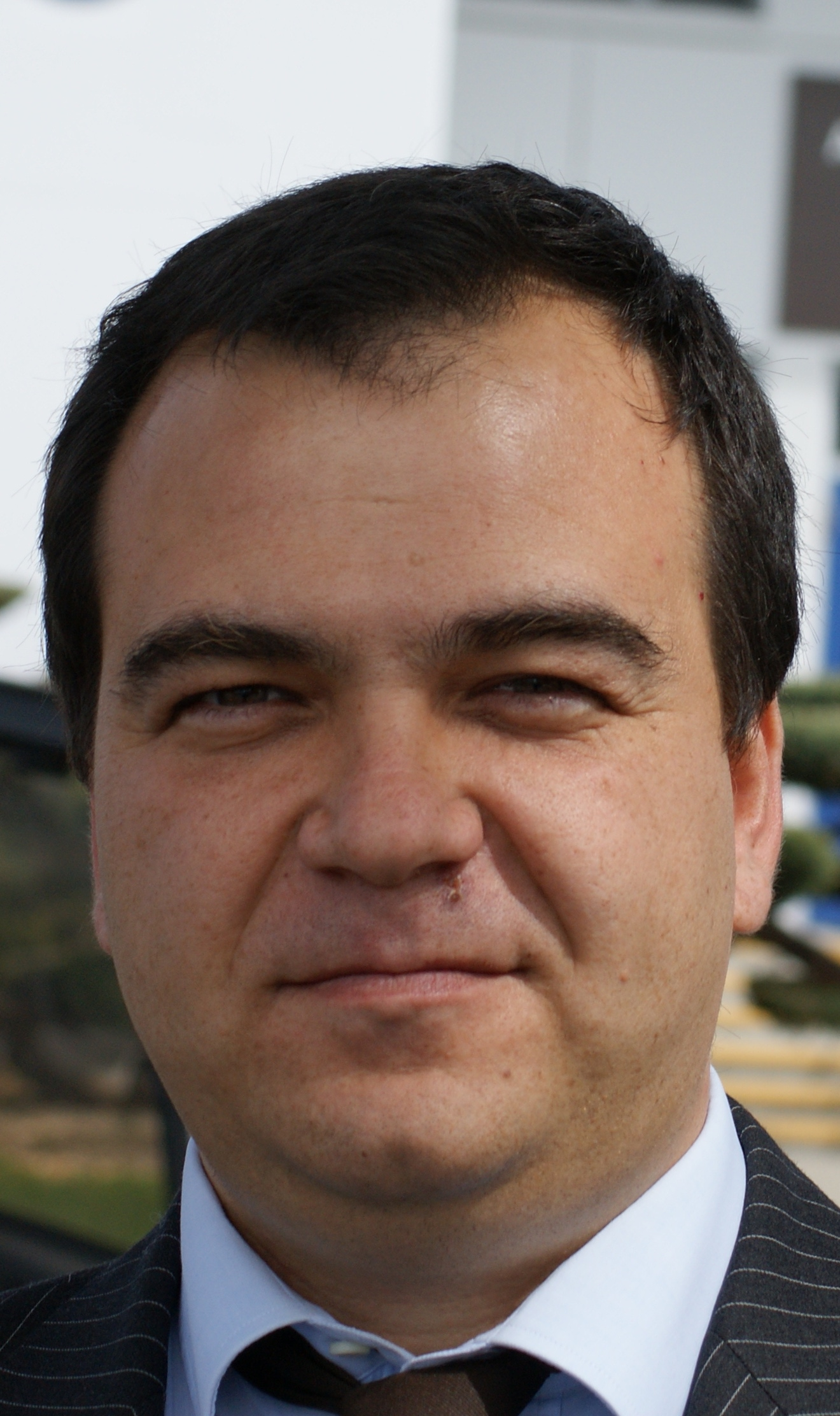
- Born: 23 April 1970 (age 56); Naples, Italy
- Occupations: Lawyer, security consultant, nuclear expert
- Known for: Suspected of poisoning Alexander Litvinenko

Mario Scaramella (born 23 April 1970) is a lawyer and security consultant. He came to international prominence in 2006 in connection with the poisoning of the ex-Federal Security Service (FSB) agent Alexander Litvinenko. He served as an investigator and adviser to the Mitrokhin Commission, with responsibility for intelligence analysis and production on KGB and military GRU espionage in Europe. Scaramella was a suspect by the Italian justice department for calumny.

While working for the Intelligence and Mitrokhin Dossier Investigative Commission at the Italian Parliament, Scaramella stated that Alexander Talik, a Ukrainian ex-KGB officer living in Naples, conspired with three other Ukrainian officers to assassinate Paolo Guzzanti, a senator and president of the Mitrokhin Commission. The Ukrainians were arrested and special weapons, including grenades, were confiscated. Talik claimed that Scaramella had exaggerated the assassination plot, which led to the calumny charge. Talik also stated that rocket-propelled grenades sent to him in Italy had in fact been sent by Scaramella himself as an undercover agent.

== Career ==
=== Academic background ===
Between 1996 and 2000, Scaramella served as a full professor of international and environmental law at the Externado University and Del Rosario University in Bogotá, Colombia, where he served as advisor to the Head of National Police Gen. Rosso Serrano Cadena. He also held a post as Academic Director of the Environmental Crime Institute at the University of Naples and Full Professor of public law. Until 2006, Scaramella was best known for a memo stating that a Soviet submarine left nuclear mines in the Bay of Naples in 1970. Official reports by the International Atomic Energy Agency and International Maritime Organization confirmed his statement. He said that his team of experts had long been involved in investigating the smuggling of radioactive material by the KGB and its successors.

=== Environmental Crime Prevention Program ===
Between 2000 and 2002, Scaramella was appointed by Steven Hermann, the Assistant Administrator of the United States Environmental Protection Agency as secretary general of the organization Environmental Crime Prevention Program (ECPP). On 12 October 2000, he signed a Memorandum of Understanding for cooperation with the secretariat of the Basel Convention on the environment, which is part of the United Nations Environment Programme. One of his few public appearances was at a 2002 security related conference, among with John Gannon, the CIA Deputy Director for Analysis and Production, for giving a lecture on "space anti-terror technologies". ECPP's observership's status to the London Convention on the Prevention of Marine Pollution by Dumping of Wastes and Other Matter meetings was withdrawn in July 2007.

== Litvinenko poisoning ==
In November 2006, former FSB agent and defector Alexander Litvinenko was assassinated in London. On 1 November 2006, Scaramella met Litvinenko for lunch at Itsu, a sushi restaurant in Piccadilly, London. On 3 November 2006 Litvinenko was admitted to his local hospital in north London, vomiting and in great pain. He had been poisoned with polonium-210, and died later that month. It was suspected he had ingested the polonium at the lunch with Scaramella. Scaramella stated that he ate nothing and drank only water at the restaurant. Two weeks later Scaramella was taken to University College Hospital, and it was confirmed that he had been exposed to polonium-210. Although Scaramella initially denied having the substance in his body, his lawyer made a statement on the same day saying that they would make no comment until the results of the tests were finalised. A room at Ashdown Park Hotel in Sussex, where Scaramella is thought to have stayed whilst in the United Kingdom was sealed off due to possible contamination. Some news outlets initially speculated Scaramella could have been Litvinenko's assassin, however the assassins were later determined to be Andrey Lugovoy and Dmitry Kovtun.

On 3 December, Italian senator Paolo Guzzanti was quoted after speaking with Scaramella by phone, saying health officials had told Scaramella the dose of polonium he had received is usually a lethal dose. Guzzanti told Reuters: "They also said so far, nobody could ever survive this poison, so it is very unlikely he could. But, if he doesn't collapse in three months, there is a kind of hope ... They said that every six months ... the radioactivity decreases by half." Later news suggested that he had only been exposed to minute traces of polonium.

Litvinenko's brother Maxim, who lives in Italy, told that Scaramella wanted to use his brother as a source for his research into Italian politicians and their alleged links to the Russian intelligence services. According to Maxim, one of the things Litvinenko did for Scaramella was sit down in front of a video camera in early 2006 in Rome. Litvinenko said that the video should not be leaked to the press. In front of the camera, he went on saying that former FSB deputy chief Anatoly Trofimov warned him in 2000 that he should not move to Italy because Romano Prodi was "one of their men". The allegations were rejected by Prodi. Litvinenko also said that "Trofimov did not exactly say that Prodi was a KGB agent, because the KGB avoids using that word." Maxim said that he was paid €200 in cash to translate on the day Scaramella recorded the video. Scaramella paid Litvinenko €500–600 to cover travel expenses.

== Mitrokhin Commission ==
The Mitrokhin Commission was an Italian parliamentary commission set up in 2002 to investigate alleged KGB ties of some Italian politicians. The Mitrokhin Commission was closed in 2006 with a majority and a minority report, without reaching shared conclusions, and without any concrete evidence given to support the original allegations of KGB ties to Italian politicians. Led by the centre-right coalition majority, it was criticized as politically motivated, as it was focused mainly on allegations against opposition figures. In November 2006, the new Italian Parliament with a centre-left coalition majority instituted a commission to investigate the Mitrokhin Commission for allegations that it was manipulated for political purposes.

In a December 2006 interview given to the television program La storia siamo noi, colonel ex-KGB agent Oleg Gordievsky, whom Scaramella claimed as his source, confirmed the accusations made against Scaramella regarding the production of false material relating to Prodi and other Italian politicians, and underlined their lack of reliability. Around the same period, there was the publication of telephone interceptions between Paolo Guzzanti, the chairman of the Mitrokhin Commission and Forza Italia senator, and Scaramella. In the wiretaps, Guzzanti made it clear that the true intent of the Mitrokhin Commission was to support the hypothesis that Prodi would have been an agent financed or in any case manipulated by Moscow and the KGB. As a result, Scaramella was charged for calumny. In addition to the calumny charge, the result of the claim regarding a Ukrainian official that he and Guzzanti were victim of an assassination attempt, he was charged of arms trafficking.

On 24 December 2006, Scaramella returned to Italy where he was immediately arrested by DIGOS, a division of the Italian national police. He was charged with calumny. According to prosecutor Pietro Salvitti, cited by La Repubblica and who indicted Scaramella, Nicolò Pollari, head of SISMI indicted in the Abu Omar case, as well as SISMI no. 2, Marco Mancini, who was arrested in July 2006 for the same reason, were some of the informers, alongside Scaramella, of Guzzanti. According to Salvitti, beside targeting Prodi and his staff, this network also aimed at defaming General Giuseppe Cucchi (the then director of the CESIS), Milan's judges Armando Spataro, in charge of the Abu Omar case, and Guido Salvini, as well as La Repubblica reporters Carlo Bonini and Giuseppe D'Avanzo. In February 2008, Scaramella struck a plea bargain deal to a four-year sentence; he did not serve any dail in jail due to a pardon.
