= Montasser el-Zayat =

Egyptian lawyer (born 1956)

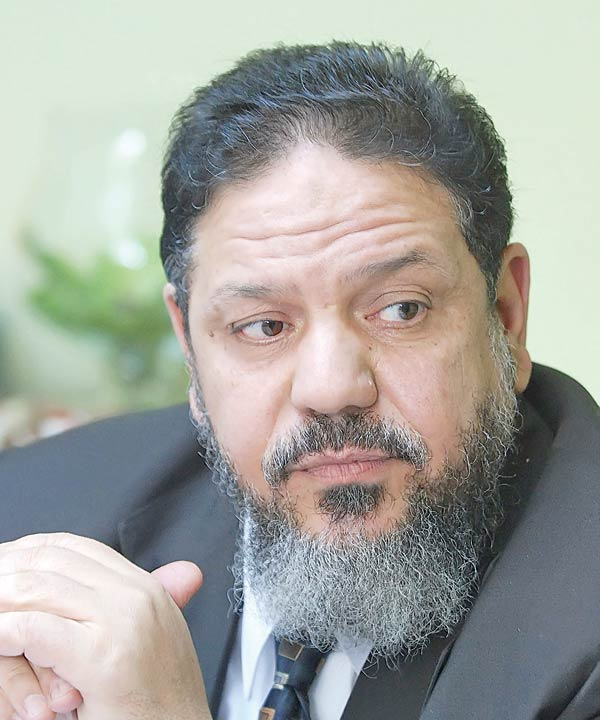
Montasser el-Zayat (2009)

Montasser el-Zayat (IPA: [monˈtɑsˤeɾ el-, ez- zæjˈjæːt]) or Muntasir al-Zayyat (Arabic: منتصر الزيات Muntaṣir az-Zayyāt; born 1956) is an Egyptian lawyer and author whose former clients, according to press reports, included Ayman al-Zawahiri, since 2011 the leader of al-Qaeda, the terrorist organization, and al-Gama'a al-Islamiyya.

Following the 1981 assassination of Anwar Sadat, as a young man, el-Zayat was one of the hundreds of politically active Egyptians who were rounded up. He was detained for three years although he was never tried or convicted.

== Early life and education ==
Montasser el-Zayat was born in 1956 in Egypt and educated there. His family is of Nubian descent.

As a young man of 21, he was arrested along with hundreds of other politically active Egyptians after the assassination of Anwar Sadat. He was detained for three years without trial and finally released.

== Career ==
Al-Zayyat became an attorney in Egypt.

His former clients are said to have included Ayman al-Zawahiri, since 2011 the leader of al-Qaeda, the terrorist organization based in Afghanistan and Pakistan. He also defended al-Gama'a al-Islamiyya.

He has written a book entitled Ayman al-Zawahiri as I Knew Him (2006), which is strongly critical of al-Zawahiri.

El-Zayat claims that al-Zawahiri responded to his criticism by electronic mail. The Washington Post reported that el-Zayat has said of al-Zawahiri, "He always thinks he is right, even if he is alone."

El-Zayat also represented Ahmad Ibrahim al-Sayyid al-Naggar in the 1999 case of the Returnees from Albania. On 1 December 2002 the Pittsburgh Tribune-Review reported that el-Zayat "accused the United States of invading the region and imposing its policies — it wants to interfere with our life, and it wants us to modify our religious curriculum. ... This is why the people approved of what happened in Kuwait, Yemen and Bali".

El-Zayat is currently the lawyer for the Egyptian cleric, Hassan Mustafa Osama Nasr. He was living in exile in Italy when he was allegedly abducted by the CIA's Special Activities Division under the direction of Robert Seldon Lady.

== Invited to defend a Guantanamo captive ==
In May 2009, Al Arabiya reported that el-Zayat had been invited to defend Mustafa al-Hawsawi, one of the fourteen high-value detainees held at the Guantanamo Bay detention camp, before a Guantanamo military commission. El-Zayat described thinking at first that he was the target of a hoax.
