= List of political scandals in Italy =

This is a list of major political scandals in Italy:

- Former Prime Minister Silvio Berlusconi underage prostitution charges, 2010s
- Lockheed bribery scandals, which caused President Giovanni Leone to resign
- Propaganda Due scandal, 1980s
- Tangentopoli, diffuse corruption cases in national politics in the early 1990s
- Revelation of Gladio, a NATO anti-communist stay-behind network
- Niger uranium forgeries used by George W. Bush as pretext for the 2003 invasion of Iraq
- SISMI-Telecom scandal, domestic surveillance program started in the 1990s and uncovered in 2006
- Bancopoli, bank takeover-merger scandal of 2005, involving insider trading, audiotapes and political influences
- Abu Omar case
- 2014 Rome corruption scandal

== See also ==
- Political alienation
- Apoliticism
- Political apathy
- Protest vote
