= SISMI-Telecom scandal =

Phone-tapping scandal in Italy

The SISMI-Telecom scandal, uncovered in Italy in 2006, refers to a surveillance scandal believed to have begun in 1996, under which more than 5,000 persons' phones were tapped.

== First arrests ==
As part of the judiciary investigation on the Imam Rapito case, the Italian justice system discovered an illegal domestic surveillance program run by Marco Mancini, former #2 of the SISMI military intelligence agency, with the help of Giuliano Tavaroli, former chief of security at the Italian Telecom company and of Pirelli, and private Florentine detective Emanuele Cipriani. All authorized requests made by magistrates to make wiretaps passed by Tavaroli.

On 21 July 2006, Adamo Bove, predecessor of Tavaroli as responsible of security at the Telecom company and former DIGOS member, died in Naples by falling from a motorway bridge. Bove had discovered a flaw in the system which enabled people to enter the Telecom system and implement wiretaps without leaving a trace. He had announced this fact to the Milan magistrates, leading to the top-secret investigation.

Giuliano Tavaroli, the chief of security of Telecom, was arrested on 20 September 2006, along with twenty other persons, including policemen and other members of the secret services, on charges of spying and corruption. The files included reports on the Democrats of the Left (DS) and other politicians.

Marco Mancini and Emanuele Cipriani were arrested on 13 December 2006. They were charged with conspiracy corruption and revealing professional secrets. Mancini allegedly received money from Cipriani and Tavaroli, who constituted approximately 30 reports on magistrates, journalists, businessmen and politicians and members of other intelligence agencies (SISDE).

Using confidential information provided by Mancini via his work at SISMI, Cipriani is accused by the Italian magistrates of having constituted files on various figures in the political, media and financial world.

== 5,000 targets ==
Targets of the surveillance program included La Repubblica reporters Giuseppe D'Avanzo and Carlo Bonini, who broke the Yellowcake forgery story and who also broke this scandal. Valentino's former creative director, Alessandra Facchinetti, was also tapped. Further investigations uncovered that more than 5,000 persons (including politicians, magistrates, football players and referees) had been placed under illegal surveillance. The scheme, allegedly instigated by Giulio Tavaroli and Marco Mancini, is believed to have begun in 1996. Data was analyzed using Enterprise Miner (from SAS System) and Analyst's Notebook.

According to La Repubblica, the main mystery concerned the exact use of these files. Money is one of the first, clear motives: participants in the deal, including Marco Mancini, Giuliano Tavaroli, Emanuele Cipriani, and a former SISDE fiduciary, Marco Bernardini, shared 20 million euros between them.

== See also ==
- List of political scandals in Italy
