= Dana Priest =

American journalist, writer and teacher (born 1957)

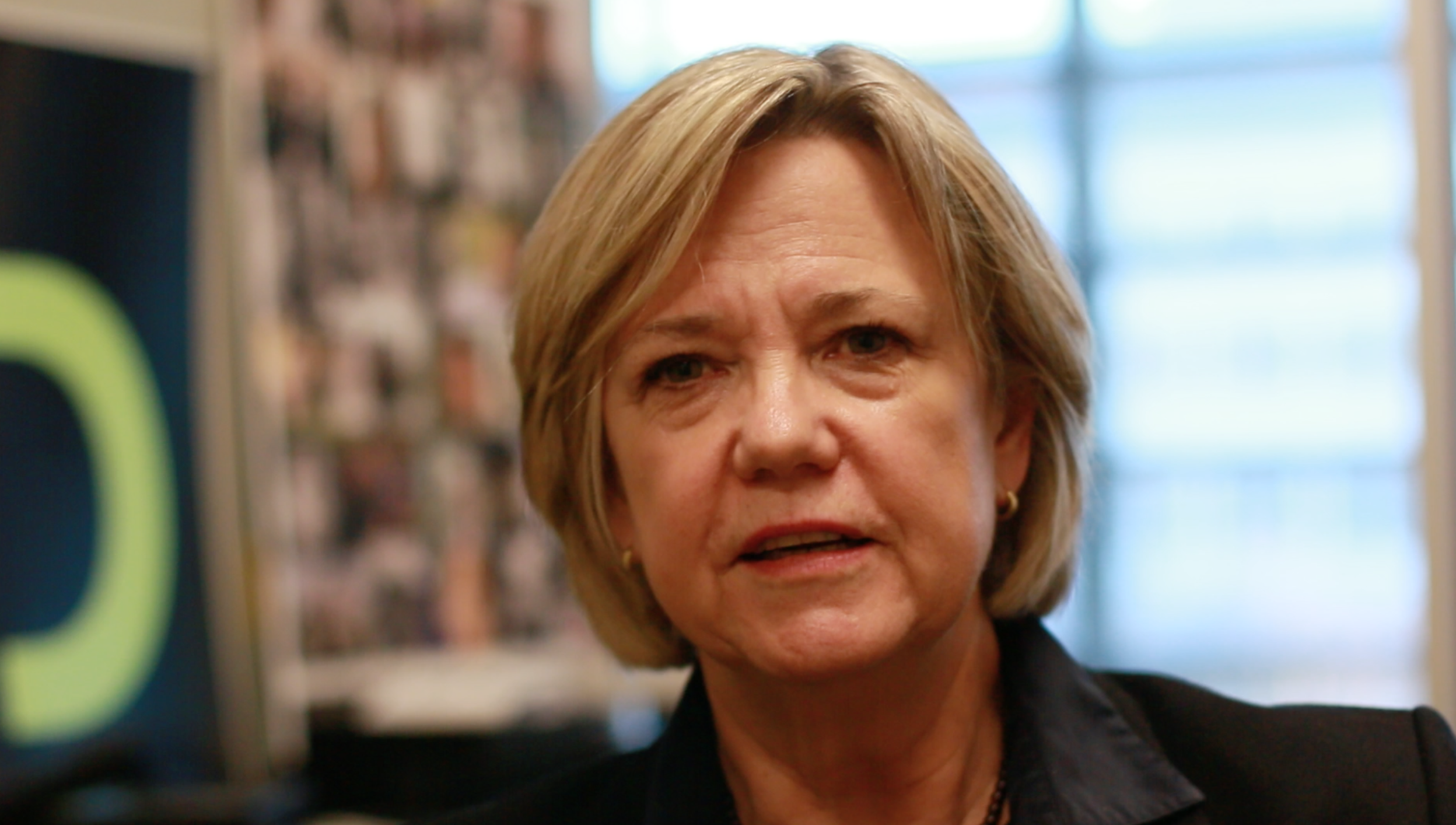
- Born: 1957 (age 68–69); Los Angeles, California, U.S.
- Education: University of California Santa Cruz (BA)
- Awards: Pulitzer Prize for Beat Reporting; 2006

Dana Louise Priest (born 1957) is an American journalist, writer and teacher. She has worked for nearly 30 years for the Washington Post and became the third John S. and James L. Knight Chair in Public Affairs Journalism at the University of Maryland's Philip Merrill College of Journalism in 2014. Before becoming a full-time investigative reporter at the Post, Priest specialized in intelligence reporting and wrote many articles on the U.S. "War on terror" and was the newspaper's Pentagon correspondent. In 2006 she won the Pulitzer Prize for Beat Reporting citing "her persistent, painstaking reports on secret "black site" prisons and other controversial features of the government's counter-terrorism campaign." The Washington Post won the 2008 Pulitzer Prize for Public Service, citing the work of reporters Priest and Anne Hull and photographer Michel du Cille "exposing mistreatment of wounded veterans at Walter Reed Hospital, evoking a national outcry and producing reforms by federal officials."

In February 2006, Priest was awarded the George Polk Award for National Reporting for her November 2005 article on secret CIA detention facilities in foreign countries. Priest also revealed the existence of the Counterterrorist Intelligence Centers (CTIC) in a November 17, 2005, front page article, which are counter-terrorist operations centers run jointly by the CIA and foreign intelligence services. The Alliance Base in Paris, involving the DGSE and other foreign intelligence agencies, is one of the most important CTIC.

== "Black sites" ==
Titled "CIA Holds Terror Suspects in Secret Prisons", the article, published by The Washington Post above the fold on November 2, 2005, asserts the existence of clandestine, extraterritorial, CIA interrogation sites. This article triggered a worldwide debate on these "black sites." The article updated one-year-old revelations by Priest and investigative reporter Joe Stephens. Priest's article states that in addition to the 750 Guantanamo Bay detainees in military custody, the CIA held approximately 30 senior members of the al Qaeda and Taliban leadership and approximately 100 foot soldiers in their own facilities around the world. She wrote that several former Soviet Bloc countries had allowed the CIA to run interrogation facilities on their territory.

On April 21, 2006, The New York Times claimed that a European Union investigation, under the direction of the Swiss senator Dick Marty, has not proved the existence of secret CIA prisons in Europe. But, Dick Marty's report, published in June 2006, showed that 14 European countries had participated in the CIA's extraordinary renditions, using various airports and military bases (i.e. Ramstein Air Base in Germany, Lajes Field in the Azores, etc.). US President George W. Bush later acknowledged the existence of secret prisons operated by the CIA during a speech on September 6, 2006.

Priest said that President Bush, former vice president Cheney and other National Security Council members personally tried to persuade the Post not to publish the story in a White House meeting, but that executive editor Leonard Downie made the decision to proceed. In an interview, Priest confirmed that the CIA had referred her story to the Justice Department, and that various Congressmembers have called for an inquiry, to determine whether she or her sources had broken any laws. The Post reported on April 21, 2006, that a CIA employee, Mary O. McCarthy, was fired for allegedly leaking classified information to Priest and other journalists. The allegation has been disputed by McCarthy and by the Post.

In an extended interview with Frontline, Priest responded to criticism that her Post reporting could have damaged national security by saying,

"There's no floodgate of information out there in the realm of intelligence; there just isn't. That defies looking at the newspapers every day. People who say that, they're just taking the word of the government. I think we did do a very responsible job at what we did. We tried to figure out a way to get as much as information to the public as we could without damaging national security."

Replying to a follow-up question about the possibility of damaging U.S. interests by publicizing or alluding to various intelligence capabilities, sources and methods, Priest said,

"Does that make sense to you? Letting the bad guys know that we can eavesdrop on them, they don't know that? I think one of the revealing facts about the NSA [wiretapping] case, if you take the government on the face value, is the extent to which they are underestimating the enemy, which is not a good thing if you want to defeat the enemy."

== Walter Reed conditions ==
On February 18, 2007 Priest and Anne Hull exposed degrading conditions at Walter Reed Army Medical Center for outpatient Iraq War veterans. The story caused an uproar across the United States and resulted in the resignation of Secretary of the Army, Francis J. Harvey.

The story exposed the existence of mold, mice and rust in outpatient facilities and showed the deteriorating conditions in facilities for wounded soldiers and veterans. This resulted in severe investigations by Rep. Henry Waxman (D-CA), who chaired the United States House Committee on Oversight and Government Reform in the House and by Sen. Carl Levin (D-MI), on the Senate side, who chaired the United States Senate Committee on Armed Services. Republicans and Democrats joined hands in criticizing the respective parties responsible for the conditions there. This prompted President George W. Bush to appoint former Senate Majority Leader and 1996 Presidential Candidate Sen. Bob Dole (R-KS) and former United States Secretary of Health and Human Services Donna Shalala to oversee the process of healthcare for wounded soldiers. The stories won the 2008 Pulitzer Prize in Public Service. In an April 12, 2013 ceremony, Priest accepted the first Pell Center Prize for Storytelling in the Public Square award for this story and her other body of published work.

== Top Secret America ==
On July 19, 2010, The Washington Post published Top Secret America online, a collaborative effort by Priest and William Arkin. The report, which took almost two years to complete, details the national security buildup in the United States following the September 11 attacks.

PBS featured Priest and Arkin's work on "Top Secret America" in a September 6, 2011 broadcast of the news documentary series Frontline.^{video} That same month, Priest and Arkin published their book, Top Secret America, released by Little, Brown and Company.

== Press Uncuffed ==
Priest founded Press Uncuffed, a campaign to help free imprisoned journalists throughout the world by selling bracelets bearing their names, along with students at the University of Maryland and in collaboration with the Committee to Protect Journalists. Eight of the journalists profiled were released, including The Washington Post's Jason Rezaian.

== Others ==
External videos
- Booknotes interview with Priest on The Mission: Waging War and Keeping Peace with America's Military, March 9, 2003, C-SPAN

Priest is the author of a book entitled: The Mission: Waging War and Keeping Peace With America's Military. She was a guest scholar at the U.S. Institute of Peace. She was a recipient of the MacArthur grant, the Gerald R. Ford Prize for Distinguished Reporting on the National Defense in 2001, and the 2004 New York Public Library's Helen Bernstein Book Award for Excellence in Journalism.

When she was a national security reporter, Priest regularly engaged in detailed on-line chats with readers regarding those subjects on the Post website. In April 2011, Priest participated in a panel discussion entitled "Could the media break a story like Watergate today?" with Bob Woodward and Carl Bernstein at the University of Texas at Austin. In the days before the 2003 invasion of Iraq, Priest and fellow Post reporter Karen DeYoung filed a story with their editors that the CIA had significant doubts about documents alleging an attempted uranium purchase, but the Post did not publish the story until March 22, 2003, after the invasion had begun.

An alumna of UC Santa Cruz, and former editor of City on a Hill Press, she lives in Washington, D.C., has two children and is married to William Goodfellow, the executive director of the Center for International Policy.

== Books ==
- The Mission: Waging War and Keeping Peace with America's Military. W. W. Norton & Company. 2003. ISBN 978-0-393-01024-4.
- Top Secret America: The Rise of the New American Security State (with William Arkin). Little, Brown and Company. 2011. ISBN 978-0-316-18221-8.
