= Abu Omar case =

Abduction and transfer to Egypt of Hassan Mustafa Osama Nasr

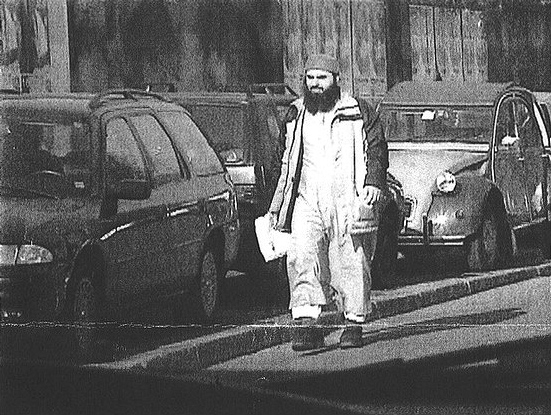
Image from the CIA's surveillance of Hassan Mustafa Osama Nasr (Abu Omar) recovered during investigations by the prosecuting authority of Milan.

The Abu Omar Case was the abduction and transfer to Egypt of the Imam of Milan Hassan Mustafa Osama Nasr, also known as Abu Omar. The case was picked by the international media as one of the better-documented cases of extraordinary rendition carried out in a joint operation by the United States' Central Intelligence Agency (CIA) and the Italian Military Intelligence and Security Service (SISMI) in the context of the global war on terrorism declared by the George W. Bush administration.

Nasr was abducted on 17 February 2003 in Milan by agents of the SISMI and CIA, and transported to the Aviano Air Base, from which he was transferred to Egypt, where he was imprisoned for four years without charges, secluded, interrogated, and "brutally tortured by America's long-standing ally, the Mubarak regime."

The CIA operation interrupted a surveillance program that was being carried out by Italian authorities into Nasr's alleged participation in Islamist organizations. Despite this interruption, Abu Omar was indicted for international terrorism offenses in Italy in 2005. The Italian government initially denied having played any role in the abduction. Referring to the Italian military intelligence agency, the Italian press talked of a "CIA–SISMI concerted operation". Hassan Nasr was released by an Egyptian court in February 2007, which ruled that his detention was "unfounded".

Once investigated, Italian prosecutors Armando Spataro and Ferdinand Enrico Pomarici indicted 26 CIA agents. Indicted agents included: the Rome station chief and head of CIA in Italy until 2003, Jeffrey W. Castelli, and Milan chief of base Robert Seldon Lady, as well as SISMI head General Nicolò Pollari, his second Marco Mancini and station chiefs Raffaele Ditroia, Luciano Di Gregori and Giuseppe Ciorra. The Italian prosecutors also sent extradition requests for the indicted American citizens to the Italian Ministry of Justice, then headed by Roberto Castelli, for onward transmission to Washington; however, Castelli refused to forward the demand for extradition.

The affair also created controversy within the CIA when the story came to light in 2005. Porter J. Goss, the director of the CIA at the time, ordered the agency's independent inspector general to begin a review of the operation. Jose A. Rodriguez Jr., then head of the National Clandestine Service (NCS), stopped the inspector general's review, stating that the NCS would investigate itself. In June 2009, Robert Seldon Lady, Milan CIA chief of base at the time, said: "I'm not guilty. I'm only responsible for carrying out orders that I received from my superiors." CIA officer Sabrina DeSousa, sentenced to five years in prison, said that the United States "broke the law ... and we are paying for the mistakes right now."

On 12 February 2013, the Court of Appeal in Milan sentenced former SISMI director Nicolò Pollari, his deputy director Marco Mancini, former Rome CIA station chief Castelli and two other CIA employees to up to 10 years in jail. Pollari announced his appeal against this ruling at Italy's Supreme Court of Cassation. On 24 February 2014, the Supreme Court of Cassation, following a sentence of the Constitutional Court of Italy regarding the use of secret evidence in the proceedings, acquitted Pollari and Mancini.

== Hassan Mustafa Osama Nasr ==
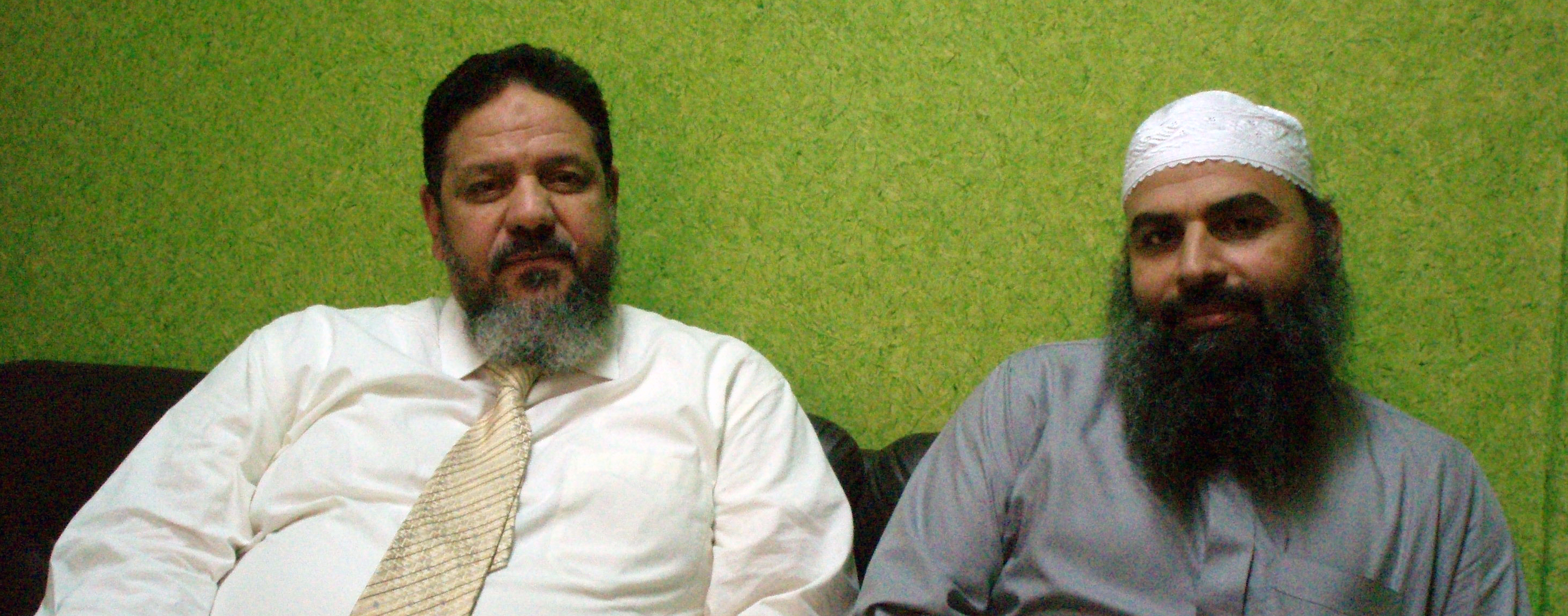
Abu Omar and his lawyer Montasser el-Zayat in Cairo

Hassan Mustafa Osama Nasr (Arabic: حسن مصطفى أسامة نصر Ḥassan Muṣṭafā Usāmah Naṣr; born 18 March 1963), also known as Abu Omar, is an Egyptian cleric. In 2003, he was living in Milan, Italy, from where he was kidnapped and tortured in Egypt. The Abu Omar case prompted a series of investigations in Italy, culminating in the criminal convictions (in absentia) of 22 CIA operatives, a U.S. Air Force colonel, and two Italian accomplices, as well as Nasr himself.

Nasr is a member of al-Gama'a al-Islamiyya, an Islamic organisation that was formerly dedicated to the overthrow of the Egyptian government; the group was committed to peaceful means following the 2013 Egyptian coup d'état that toppled Mohamed Morsi. The group was linked to the murder of Anwar Sadat in 1981 and a terrorist campaign in the 1990s that culminated in the November 1997 Luxor massacre. As a result, it is considered a terrorist organization by the United States and European Union. After the Egyptians declared the group illegal, Nasr sought asylum in Italy. During the 1990s, he fought in the Bosnian War. On 11 February 2007, Nasr's lawyer Montasser el-Zayat confirmed that his client had been released and was now back with his family. After four years of detention, an Egyptian court ruled that his imprisonment was "unfounded".

== Investigation ==
Nasr was a radical Egyptian cleric and alleged member of al-Gama'a al-Islamiyya who had fled Egypt due to that group's prosecution as a terrorist organization by the Egyptian government. He was granted political asylum in Italy in 2001, and held an Italian asylum passport. As early as spring 2002, he was under investigation by Italian and American intelligence agencies by means of wiretaps and physical and electronic surveillance. Italian authorities have claimed that they believed that they had evidence Nasr was building a network to recruit terrorists, and possibly had links to Al Qaeda. They alleged in particular links with Ansar al-Islam and ties to a network sending combatants in the Iraqi Kurdistan. Citing a book on Al-Qaeda by Jason Burke, a British reporter at The Observer, the Italian daily newspaper La Repubblica observed in June 2005 that in 2002, before the invasion of Iraq, the Bush administration was claiming, along with British prime minister Tony Blair, that Iraq maintained close links with Al-Qaeda, in particular through Ansar al-Islam. La Repubblica concluded that the Abu Omar case was a "chapter in the combination of intelligence–psychological warfare–information war engaged by Washington and London to justify the invasion of Iraq." There are also reports that Nasr was involved in plotting a terrorist attack on the U.S. embassy in Rome, and was suspected of being involved in a plot to bomb a number of children of foreign diplomats attending the American School of Milan, although sources disagree whether such plots even existed.

== Abduction and rendition to Egypt ==
On February 17, 2003, Nasr was abducted by persons affiliated with the CIA as he walked to his mosque in Milan for noon prayers. According to court documents, Nasr was pushed into a minivan on Via Giuseppe Guerzoni in Milan and driven four or five hours to a joint Italian-U.S. air base at Aviano, where he was tortured. From there, he was flown by a Learjet (using the call sign SPAR 92) to Ramstein Air Base, Germany. Germany launched an official investigation due to false imprisonment and coercion, but the case was ultimately dropped as it could not be determined which CIA agents were involved in the abduction. SPAR (Special Priority Air Resource) is the call sign used by US senior military officers and civilian VIPs for airlift transport. A second plane then took him to Cairo, where he was imprisoned and, he claims, tortured.

In April 2004, while his incarceration had been downgraded to house arrest, Nasr placed several phone calls from Egypt to his family and friends. He told them he had been rendered into the hands of Egypt's SSI at Tura prison, twenty miles south of Cairo. He was subjected to various depredations, tortured by beating and electric shocks to the genitals, raped, and eventually had lost hearing in one ear. At the time of the calls he had been released on the orders of an Egyptian judge because of lack of evidence. Shortly after those calls were made he was re-arrested and placed back in prison. Nasr was not released again until February 11, 2007, at which time he was permitted to return to his family. After four years of detention, an Egyptian court ruled that his imprisonment was "unfounded". In 2006, Nasr's lawyer Montasser el-Zayat said Nasr was underfed but there were "no signs of torture".

== Investigation and warrants for CIA operatives ==
The CIA agents were implicated, in part, by extensive cellphone records which allowed Milan police to reconstruct their movements for the nine days they were in the city. Because the agents had apparently not, at any time, removed the batteries from their cellphones, investigators were able to pinpoint their locations from moment to moment. The agents also made numerous phone calls to the US consulate in Milan, to northern Virginia (where the CIA headquarters are located) and to friends and family in the United States. The operation was led by Robert Seldon Lady, former CIA chief of base in Milan, who was then operating out of the U.S. embassy under diplomatic cover as the "Consul of the United States in Milan". The operation was carried out by the CIA's Special Activities Division. Lady said that he opposed the abduction plans but was overruled. Lady subsequently retired from the CIA, which put him in a precarious legal position, as the status of his diplomatic immunity was in doubt.

In December 2005, CIA Director Porter Goss ordered a sweeping review of the agency's field operations because of what he perceived as the Milan rendition's "sloppiness". In June 2005, Italian judge Guido Salvini issued warrants for the arrest of 22 persons said to be agents or operatives of the CIA, including Jeffrey W. Castelli, head of the CIA in Italy until 2003. Salvini said the abduction was illegal because it violated Italian sovereignty and international law and disrupted an ongoing police investigation. He also issued a warrant for the arrest of Nasr, on charges of associating with terrorists. In November 2005, Italian prosecutors requested that Italy's Justice Ministry seek the extradition of the suspects from the United States. The Italian government declined. On 20 December 2005, an Italian court issued a European arrest warrant against 22 CIA agents suspected of this kidnapping, including among others Robert Seldon Lady, Eliana Castaldo, Lt. Col. Joseph L. Romano, III. It is possible that some of the names for the targets of the warrant were pseudonyms. Regarding "Eliana Castaldo", a reporter's attempts to contact her through the number listed on the affidavit produced inconsistent responses: one refused to identify the business, another said she was with an answering service, while a third said the number was that of a firm by the name of Washburn and Company. Each of the persons answering denied there was an Eliana Castaldo reachable at that number.

== One of the "concerted CIA-SISMI operations" ==
The abduction occurred without the knowledge of the Italian intelligence and law enforcement officials working directly on the Nasr case, who initially suspected that Nasr had been kidnapped by the Egyptian government, possibly with the cooperation of other branches of the Italian government. When the Italians questioned their American counterparts about Nasr's disappearance, they were told he had traveled voluntarily to the Balkans. Furthermore, Italian officials initially denied the Italian government had authorized or sanctioned a US operation to kidnap Nasr. Italian Minister for Parliamentary Affairs Carlo Giovanardi, member of Silvio Berlusconi's second and third government, said in no uncertain terms to the Italian parliament: "Our secret services were not aware of the operation ... It was never brought to the attention of the government or national institutions." Former CIA officials contradicted this by claiming the agency had secured the consent of Italian intelligence, and that the CIA's station chief in Rome, Jeffrey W. Castelli, had been granted explicit permission for the operation by his Italian counterpart.

The circumstances of Nasr's abduction tended to accredit the thesis of at least passive support of the operation by Italian intelligence services. In particular, questions were raised by the CIA agents' startling laxity in travel arrangements. By all accounts, they did little to cover their tracks. Instead of fleeing immediately, most of them remained in Italy days after the operation, in some of Milan's best hotels. Only some of them used aliases. The rest traveled with their normal passports and drivers licenses, paid for things with credit cards in their real names, chatted openly on cell phones before, during, and after the operation. After the abduction, they even carelessly bypassed speed limits in Milan. Some have speculated this represents evidence of Italian complicity, as little apparent effort was made to obfuscate the identities of the participants. This hypothesis was confirmed by Italian investigations. On 5 July 2006, two high-ranking Italian intelligence officers were arrested by Italian police for their complicity in Nasr's kidnapping. These included Marco Mancini, number 2 of SISMI, Italy's military intelligence agency, and Gustavo Pignero, the agency's chief for the northern region of Italy. Italian wiretaps caught Mancini admitting that he had lied about his involvement in the abduction case. These arrests signaled the first official admission that Italian intelligence agents were involved in the abduction. Additionally, the former head of SISMI's Milan office, Col. Stefano D'Ambrosio, claims that he was removed from his position by his superiors because of his objections to the abduction plot; he was later replaced by Mancini.

Public prosecutors Armando Spataro and Pomarici have described the abduction as "a concerted CIA-SISMI operation" organized by "Italian and American agents" with the aim of the "capture" and "secret transfer" of the imam to Egypt. Paolo Biondani and Italian counter-terrorist expert Guido Olimpio cited the 18 November 2005, article published by Dana Priest in The Washington Post, where she described the CTIC (Counter-Terrorism Intelligence Center), a "joint operation centers in more than two dozen countries where U.S. and foreign intelligence officers work side by side to track and capture suspected terrorists and to destroy or penetrate their networks". Italy was not included in this international alliance of intelligence agencies, which largest base was in Paris, named Alliance Base. According to Guido Olimpio and Paolo Biondani, Italy was not included in the CTIC because of internal jealousy between various Italian intelligence agencies. They observed that despite this, the arrest ordinance against Marco Mancini and his superior General Gustavo Pignero referred to the operation as an example of the "non orthodox activity" (the only one known of) realized by the CIA and the SISMI "since 2002", thus demonstrating some sort of cooperation between US and Italian intelligence agencies, albeit not in the frame of the CTIC. Furthermore, according to testimonies by SISMI agents to the Italian justice, Mancini proposed himself to the CIA as a "double agent".

According to Colonel Stefano D'Ambrosio, former SISMI responsible in Milan replaced by Mancini, the CIA refused to hire the latter because they considered him too "venal"; however, his demand "left traces in the computer" of the US intelligence. All SISMI testimonies converge in saying that Mancini owed his dazzling career to his "privileged relations with the CIA". According to SISMI testimony, after the 17 February 2003 kidnapping of Nasr, then CIA director George Tenet sent a letter to SISMI General Nicolò Pollari in August 2003, to which Mancini would allegedly owe the real reasons of his promotion to number two of the SISMI. In another, earlier article, the same author, Guido Olimpio, wrote that following the abduction of the imam, SISMI informed the Italian government and then the CIA, assuring them that no agent who had taken part in this covert operation would be prosecuted. In turn, CIA director George Tenet would have sent a letter to Forte Braschi, the SISMI headquarters in Rome.

== Trial ==
In April 2006, just after the 2006 Italian general election, outgoing Justice Minister Roberto Castelli of the Northern League told prosecutors that he had decided not to pass the extradition request to the United States. Apart from the July 2006 arrest of Marco Mancini (the then number two of the SISMI) and Gustavo Pignero (the then agency's chief for the northern region of Italy), the head of SISMI General Nicolò Pollari had to resign in November 2006 because of the affair and was indicted in December by the Milanese judges. In addition to the 22 European arrest warrants issued in December 2005 and the arrest of the above-mentioned SISMI officers, an Italian judge issued additional arrest warrants for four Americans, three CIA agents, and for Lieutenant Colonel Joseph L. Romano III, commander of security forces at the Aviano Air Base at the time and by now working at Section 31b of the Pentagon. Ultimately, twenty-six Americans and nine Italians (including head of SISMI Nicolò Pollari, number two of the same intelligence agency Marco Mancini, as well as General Gustavo Pignero; and also the junior ROS officer Giuliano Pironi) were indicted.

The trial would be the first criminal trial related to the U.S. practice of extraordinary rendition. The start of the trial was set for 8 June, 2007, although it was adjourned until October 2007, pending an upcoming ruling by Italy's Constitutional Court regarding the possible violation of state secrecy laws by Milan prosecutors who used phone taps on Italian agents during their investigation. Two other Italian suspects reached plea bargains. Giuliano Pironi, who admitted stopping Nasr and controlling his identity during the kidnapping, was given a suspended sentence of one year, nine months and a day. Renato Farina, vice-director of Libero, who was hired by the SISMI in 1999, was accused as an accessory. He was given six months sentence that was converted into a fine. Carabinieri Pironi testified that he asked for Nasr' identity papers on Robert Lady's request, and assured that the operation was a concerted CIA-SISMI operation. The first one to confess the involvement of the CIA and the SISMI in the abduction of Nasr, Pironi thought, when he participated in the operation, that he was passing a test to enter the SISMI. He later realized he had been instrumentalized

Marco Mancini admitted to Milan prosecutors having followed orders of his superior General Pignero, who himself obeyed requests from Jeff Castelli, CIA head in Italy, to the director of the SISMI, General Pollari. Mancini confessed having organised a meeting in Bologna with all the heads of the SISMI centers. He illustrated on this occasion the plan for the abduction. The arrest warrants issued on June 15, 2006, against Jeff Castelli, other US agents, Mancini and Pignero were done on these grounds. In the meantime, Milan prosecutor Armando Spataro found out the existence of an office, in the centre of Rome, linked to SISMI, in charge of 'secret operations.' It was directed by a close collaborator of head of SISMI Pollari. According to the European Parliament "Temporary Committee on the Alleged Use of European Countries by the CIA for the Transport and the Illegal Detention of Prisoners", headed by rapporteur Claudio Fava:

The main target of this office consisted in distorting the national press information, through journalists ad hoc hired by SISMI, by editing false reports with the aim to keep high the "terrorism alert" vis-à-vis the public opinion. Among the duties also the one of chasing and tapping the communications of the two journalists of the newspaper "La Repubblica" in charge of the Abu Omar case: Carlo Bonini and Giuseppe D'Avanzo.

In a secretly registered conversation General Pignero, Mancini's superior, confirmed having met SISMI director Pollari right after a meeting with Jeff Castelli, head of the CIA in Italy. He said on this occasion that he had received by Pollari a list of names, among others that of Nasr, and to have been ordered to observe the Egyptian cleric in view of his abduction. Pignero then ordered Mancini to proceed with all these activities. Interrogated by the Milan prosecutor in July 2006, General Pollari involved the Italian government and invoked a classified document. Romano Prodi's government confirmed its classified status. During his hearing in August 2006 before the Italian Parliamentary Committee on Secret services control (Copaco), Pollari defended himself again invoking the raison d'état. In October 2006, prosecutor Spataro transmitted to the European Temporary Committee a copy of a SISMI document, from which it comes out that SISMI was informed by the CIA on 15 May 2003 that Nasr was interrogated in Cairo by Egyptian services. Enrico Micheli, the Italian government's responsible for secret services, declared to the European committee that the Berlusconi administration had classified files related to the Abu Omar case, and that the Prodi administration confirmed such secrecy.

Any trial of American citizens is expected to happen in absentia. The United States is not expected to extradite the CIA operatives. As of February 2007, the Italian government issued no extradition requests, although the Italian judiciary called for the government to do so since 2005. The then Justice Minister Clemente Mastella, member of the new government of Prodi, Prime Minister of Italy since the 2006 general election, gave no news of the extradition request given to him by Armando Spataro, the Milanese public prosecutor. On 15 February 2007, the then Minister of Infrastructures and former prosecutor of Milan Antonio di Pietro criticized his governmental colleagues, arguing that the refuse to transmit the extradition requests to the US abounded to "cover an illegal operation, the kidnapping of a person." Freed on 11 February 2007, Nasr deposed a complaint against former Prime minister Silvio Berlusconi, demanding 10 million Euro of damage and interests "for his implication in the kidnapping as chief of the government [during the events] and for having permitted the CIA to capture him." The Italian executive opposed the judges in Milan by deposing a recourse before the Constitutional Court of Italy against Armando Spataro, charging him of having violated state secret by using the wiretaps recordings of SISMI agents. In particular, Prodi's government accused the magistrates of having revealed the identity of 85 foreign and Italian spies. The Italian government said it would wait for the ruling before issuing the extradition requests.

=== Convictions ===
On 4 November 2009, an Italian judge convicted 22 suspected or known CIA agents, a U.S. Air Force (USAF) colonel and two Italian secret agents of the kidnapping, delivering the first legal convictions in the world against people involved in the CIA's extraordinary renditions program. Former Milan CIA base chief Robert Seldon Lady received eight years in prison. The rest of the Americans, including former Milan U.S. consular official Sabrina De Sousa, and USAF Lieutenant Colonel Joseph L. Romano, at the time of conviction commander of the 37th Training Group at Lackland Air Force Base, Texas, got five years each. The convicts were also ordered to each pay €1 million to Nasr and €500,000 to his wife. Three Americans, including the then-Rome CIA station chief Jeffrey Castelli and two other diplomats formerly assigned to the U.S. Embassy in Rome, as well as the former head of Italian military intelligence Nicolo Pollari and four other Italian secret service agents were acquitted due to diplomatic immunity.

All but two Italians were tried in absentia, and as long as the verdicts remain in place the 23 convicted Americans cannot travel to Europe without risking arrest. U.S. State Department spokesman Ian Kelly expressed disappointment over the verdicts. Pentagon Press Secretary Geoff S. Morrell said that the judge had ignored requests for Lieutenant Colonel Romano's case to be moved to the United States, adding: "Our view is the Italian court has no jurisdiction over Lieutenant Colonel Romano and should have immediately dismissed the charges. Now that they have not, we will, of course, explore what options we have going forward." The CIA declined to comment. Prime Minister Silvio Berlusconi denied knowledge of any kidnap operation, and criticized the trial claiming that it could hurt Italy's international reputation.

In September 2012, Italy's highest court, the Supreme Court of Cassation, upheld the guilty verdicts that had been handed down by lower courts. The Italian government did not state whether it would seek extradition of the convicted Americans. On February 13, 2013, the Milano Court of Appeals sentenced former SISMI director Nicolò Pollari to ten years in jail and awarded €1.5 million in damages to Nasr and his wife. Pollari's deputy director Marco Mancini was sentenced to nine years in jail, the former CIA station chief Jeffrey Castelli in absentia to seven years in jail, along with two other CIA employees. Pollari announced that he would he appeal against this ruling at the Supreme Court of Cassation. In July 2013, Robert Seldon Lady was initially detained in Panama at the request of Italian authorities, but then released and allowed to board a flight to the United States.

In December 2013, Nasr was convicted in absentia of terrorism by an Italian court for offences before his abduction. Egypt had not responded to Italian requests to extradite or even interview Nasr for the trial. Nasr remains living in Egypt and is unlikely to be sent to Italy to serve out his sentence. Sabrina De Sousa was detained at the Lisbon airport in Portugal on October 5, 2015. She was due to be extradited to Italy, but a partial pardon from the Italian president – in February 2017 – reduced the sentence from four to three years which was then commuted to community service for which extradition is not possible. The original sentence was already reduced from seven to four years through a general amnesty law in 2006.

In January 2016, former C.I.A. agent Sabrina De Sousa, one of the agents convicted in Italy, was ordered by Portugal to be extradited to Italy, although that order will be appealed. She was briefly detained at the Lisbon airport in October 2015, and her passport was confiscated pending a court review of the European arrest warrant issued for her arrest. She disclaimed any involvement in the affair and worked to clear her name, including writing a memoir about her activities. Her appeal was denied on April 11, 2016. After being detained in Portugal in February 2017 and about to be deported to Italy, she was pardoned by the Italian president and released on 28 February 2017. In February 2016, the European Court of Human Rights condemned Italy over this affair and ordered Italy to pay €115,000 (£90,000; $127,000) in damages and expenses to Nasr and his wife, Nabila Ghali.

== Political context ==
The exposé of the incident, coming just before Italy's general election, was a major embarrassment for the third Berlusconi government. If it had admitted foreknowledge of or complicity in the operation, it would have been admitting that one part of the government (its intelligence services) deliberately undermined the efforts of another (its judiciary). If it had denied any involvement, it would point to a serious lapse in Italian security, as it would mean foreign intelligence agencies would be able to pull off major operations within Italy, right under the nose of Italy's own intelligence agencies, with virtual impunity. Either way, most observers thought it clear that Berlusconi did not wish the case to proceed. He initially told the press that he did not believe the CIA was responsible for the abduction, and even if they were responsible, it was a justifiable action. He was widely quoted in the press as having said: "You can't tackle terrorism with a law book in your hand." He then declared to the ANSA agency: "This is a trial we absolutely should not have, and its result will be that our intelligence services will no longer have the cooperation of foreign intelligence."

The Abu Omar case posed the problem of Italy's involvement in the U.S.-led "war on terror". The incident also served to highlight tensions between Italy's fiercely independent judiciary and its executive administration (including the intelligence services), which would have preferred the judiciary did not press the issue with the United States. During the Italian investigations into the incident, it was discovered that not only had SISMI (or a division of it) collaborated with the CIA in the abduction, it had also been illegally surveiling Italian citizens, particularly Italian magistrates unfriendly to Berlusconi's governments, often with the help of Italian journalists. Italian prosecutors believed reporters from Libero used interviews with the lead prosecutor in the abduction case, Armando Spataro, as a pretext to glean confidential information to pass on to SISMI agents. On 6 July 2006, the offices of Libero were raided by Italian police. In 2010, leaked diplomatic documents revealed the efforts the United States used in an attempt to stop Italy from indicting the CIA agents, and that Italian Prime Minister Berlusconi assured US Secretary of Defense Robert Gates that he was "working hard to resolve the situation" but that Italy's judicial system was "dominated by leftists".

== CIA chief of base admission ==
In June 2009, Robert Seldon Lady, Milan CIA chief of base at the time, was quoted by Il Giornale saying: "I'm not guilty. I'm only responsible for carrying out orders that I received from my superiors." He denied criminal responsibility because it was a "state matter", and added: "I console myself by reminding myself that I was a soldier, that I was in a war against terrorism, that I couldn't discuss orders given to me." Lady's retirement villa was seized by magistrates to cover court costs. In July 2013, Lady was arrested in Panama on an international arrest warrant. The next day, he was released.

== See also ==
- CIA activities in Italy
- Human rights in Egypt
- List of political scandals in Italy
- Montasser el-Zayat
- SISMI-Telecom scandal, discovered by Italian justice during investigations concerning "Abu Omar"

Similar cases

- Maher Arar
- Khalid El-Masri
- Mohammed Haydar Zammar
- Mordechai Vanunu
