= Joseph L. Romano =

- Military career
- Allegiance: , United States of America
- Branch: United States Air Force
- Service years: 1976–2010
- Rank: Colonel
- Units: 37th Training Group, Lackland AFB, Texas
- Commands: 1st Security Police Squadron, Langley Air Force Base, Va. 9th Security Police Squadron, Beale Air Force Base, Calif; 31st Security Forces Squadron, Aviano AB, Italy; 586th Expeditionary Security Forces Squadron, Camp Bucca, Iraq; 37th Training Group, Lackland AFB, Texas
- Conflicts: Iraq War
- Awards: Bronze Star; Defense Meritorious Service Medal; Meritorious Service Medal with 1 silver leaf cluster Joint Service Commendation Medal; Air Force Commendation Medal with two oak leaf clusters Air Force Achievement Medal with one oak leaf cluster Army Achievement Medal; Joint Meritorious Unit Award with one oak leaf cluster Air Force Meritorious Unit Award; National Defense Medal; Iraq Campaign Medal; Global War on Terrorism Service Medal; NATO Medal

Colonel Joseph L. Romano III is an officer in the United States Air Force and one of 26 American nationals charged by Italian authorities with the 2003 kidnapping of Italian resident cleric Hassan Nasr as part of an alleged covert CIA operation. Romano was subsequently convicted in absentia of kidnapping. On 5 April 2013, Giorgio Napolitano, the President of the Italian Republic, pardoned Romano.

== Background and career ==
In his own words, Romano comes from a family with a legacy of military service, including his father who served as a corporal in the Korean War.

== Recent activities ==
=== Investigation by Italian authorities ===
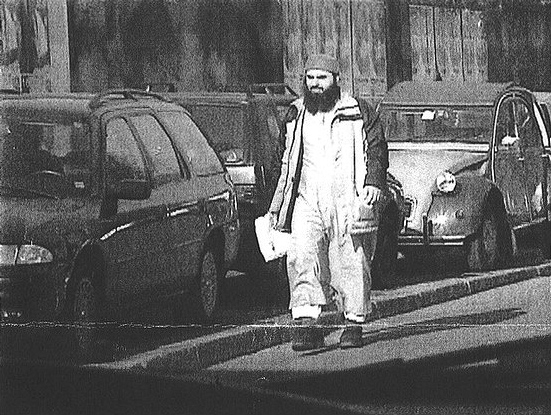
Image from the CIA's surveillance of Hassan Mustafa Osama Nasr recovered during investigations by the prosecuting authority of Milan

At the time of the Hassan Nasr kidnapping, Romano was commander of the 31st Security Forces Squadron stationed in Aviano Air Base near Venice. On June 27, 2005, he was made subject of a Europe-wide arrest warrant, centering on contentions of Italian authorities that he was in charge of security operations during the kidnapping of Nasr in February, 2003. The subsequent formal transmission of the arrest warrants to the Eurojust judicial coordination office meant that they became immediately effective throughout all E.U. member countries, and that Romano and all 22 other U.S. nationals named in the warrant were subject to immediate arrest within their respective jurisdictions. Among the evidentiary points cited in the warrant, issued by the Tribunale di Milano, were the fact that one of the four subscribed numbers traced by authorities as having transmitted from the scene of the kidnapping to Aviano was "assigned to, owned and used by" Col. Romano.

A formal indictment was issued by Judge Caterina Interlandi on February 16, 2007. Romano – the only military officer among the 26 U.S. nationals indicted – has refused to comment on the allegations. "I have nothing to say," he has said, referring questions about the "alleged incident that I'm supposedly involved in" to Air Force senior leadership and the service's public affairs office.

On November 4, 2009, Romano, along with 22 other Americans, was convicted in absentia in an Italian court for his alleged role in the Hassan Nasr kidnapping. The judge in the case, Oscar Maggi, sentenced Romano to five years in prison. However, it is very unlikely Romano will ever serve any time. Reacting to the verdict, Pentagon press secretary Geoff S. Morrell stated "Our view is the Italian court has no jurisdiction over Lieutenant Colonel (Joseph) Romano and should have immediately dismissed the charges. Now that they have not, we will, of course, explore what options we have going forward". Referring to all the convictions, State Department spokesman Ian Kelly stated "We are disappointed by the verdicts against the Americans and Italians charged in Milan for their alleged involvement in the case involving Egyptian cleric Abu Omar".

=== Deployment in Iraq ===
Romano commanded the 586th Expeditionary Security Forces Squadron that deployed to Camp Bucca in December 2004. The unit, was activated in October 2004 and originally called the 732nd Expeditionary Security Forces Squadron; in March 2005 the unit was renamed the 586th Expeditionary Security Forces Squadron. The unit was assembled in 45 days and consisted of security forces personnel from 17 bases representing every major command in the Air Force. The Airmen performed three of the Army's traditional missions—detainee operations, patrolling duties, and convoy escort duties. In an unusual move, the airmen also helped provide force protection for the Army camp.

=== Transfer to the Pentagon ===
Since 2005, Romano has worked at Section 31P of The Pentagon. In August 2006, he was selected for promotion to colonel, but as of December 2006 he was still holding the rank of lieutenant colonel.

=== Promotion and assignment ===
As of 2009 he was promoted to colonel and reassigned to Lackland AFB, Texas. Romano was given command of the 37th Training Group of the 37th Training Wing.

=== Pardon ===
Romano, through his lawyer Cesare Bulgheroni, asked for pardon. On April 5, 2013, the President of Italy Giorgio Napolitano accepted Romano's request, discharging him from crimes related to the kidnapping allegations.

== See also ==
- Background article on the Imam Rapito affair, regarding the aftermath and political context of the Hassan Mustafa Osama Nasr (Abu Omar) kidnapping.
- Extraordinary rendition.
