= Jeffrey Castelli =

American intelligence officer

Jeffrey W. Castelli is a CIA officer who served as CIA station chief in Rome at the time of the Niger uranium forgeries. His subsequent involvement in the CIA-led kidnapping of Hassan Mustafa Osama Nasr would lead to his subsequent sentencing to seven years in prison, by an Italian court, in 2013.

== Convicted to seven years in prison in the Imam Rapito affair ==
Castelli was CIA station chief in Rome at the time of the kidnapping of Egyptian cleric Hassan Mustafa Osama Nasr on February 17, 2003, and was among 26 U.S. nationals (and one of the few with confirmed identities) subsequently indicted by Italian authorities for their involvement in what in the Italian press is referred to as the Imam Rapito (or "kidnapped cleric") affair.

On February 4, 2013, Castelli was convicted to seven years in prison, by a Milan court, along with three other CIA officials. None of the convicted US officials were present at the trial and none of them have been extradited to Italy later.

== See also ==
- Extraordinary rendition by the United States
