= Alliance Base =

Counterterrorist organization in Paris

Alliance Base was the cover name for a secret Western Counterterrorist Intelligence Center (CTIC) that existed between 2002 and 2009 in Paris, France. It was staffed by intelligence officers from Great Britain, France, Germany, Canada, Australia and the United States, who used it to exchange intelligence and plan operations. It was led by a French general of the Directorate-General for External Security (DGSE), and largely funded by the CIA's Counterterrorist Center.

Its existence was revealed on July 2, 2005, by Washington Post reporter Dana Priest, who would later reveal it to be just one of several CTICs on November 17, 2005. Its existence was officially confirmed on September 8, 2006, by Christophe Chaboud, chief of France's UCLAT ("Unité de Coordination de la Lutte contre le Terrorisme", "Fight against Terrorism Coordination Unit").

The name alluded to Al-Qaeda, which means "The Base" in Arabic.

== International cooperation between intelligence agencies ==
Its existence was revealed by a November 17, 2005, article in the Washington Post by reporter Dana Priest in The Washington Post, who also broke the story of the CIA's "black sites". In the article, both the CIA and the French government declined to comment on Alliance Base, while all intelligence officers requested anonymity due to the sensitive nature of the project, in particular relating to its political and judicial dimensions. "No country wanted to be perceived as taking direction from the CIA," Priest wrote. France was the only European state willing to engage in more than simple information exchange. "To play down the U.S. role, the center's working language is French," an anonymous source told her. "The base selects its cases carefully, chooses a lead country for each operation, and that country's service runs the operation." Furthermore, this cooperation permits "German case officers to read information from their own country's law enforcement authorities", which is prohibited by German law.

Alliance Base also takes advantage of the "harsh laws" of France concerning anti-terrorism. French magistrates are allowed to detain people suspected of "conspiracy in relation to terrorism" while gathering evidence. According to the top anti-terrorist magistrate, Jean-Louis Bruguière, he has in the past ordered the arrest of more than 500 suspects, some with the assistance of US authorities. Dana Priest cited him as saying: "I have good connections with the CIA and FBI." Priest described the working of Alliance Base, writing that "The CIA brings money from its classified and ever-growing 'foreign liaison' account — it has paid to transport some of France's suspects from abroad into Paris for legal imprisonment' [thus rendering them to France] — and its global eavesdropping capabilities and worldwide intelligence service ties." France, on the other hand, "brings its harsh laws, surveillance of radical Muslim groups and their network in Arab states, and its intelligence links to its former colonies".

By reporting information to its counterparts, French intelligence agencies helped the US convict Ahmed Ressam, arrested in 1999, as well as Zacarias Moussaoui, who lived a long time in France.

In the days following the 9/11 attacks, President Jacques Chirac issued an edict to French secret services ordering them to share information with US counterparts "as if they were your own service," according to two officials who read it and were cited by Dana Priest. According to The Washington Post investigative reporter, the arrest of Christian Ganczarski, alleged to be a senior Al Qaeda leader, was one of the 12 major operations it conducted during its first years. Since the end of 2001, France has detained about 60 suspects, some with the help of the CIA, according to a CIA veteran cited by Priest.

Pierre de Bousquet de Florian, director of the Directorate of Territorial Surveillance (DST), said "There's easy exchange of information. The cooperation between my service and the American service is candid, loyal and certainly effective." Jean-Louis Brugière, on the other hand, was quoted by Dana Priest as saying that "The relations between intelligence agencies in the United States and France has been good, even during the transatlantic dispute over Iraq, for practical reasons".

John E. McLaughlin, former director of the CIA, has claimed that the cooperation between the DGSE and the CIA "is one of the best of the world".

== Christian Ganczarski and Ahmed Medhi ==
Christian Ganczarski, a German convert to Islam, took an Air France flight from Riyadh on June 3, 2003, back to Germany, with a change of planes in Paris. But he was secretly followed on board by an undercover officer. In Paris' airport, a senior CIA officer was waiting for him, while French authorities separated him from his family and arrested him, on charges of association with terrorists. This operation was conceived at the Alliance Base.

On May 20, 2003, Alliance Base learned that Ahmed Mehdi, who lived near Ganczarski in Germany, was about to travel for a 14-day vacation to La Réunion, a French island in the Indian Ocean. Although the German BND thought that he was planning an attack, they had not enough evidence to arrest him. The CIA arranged someone to suggest that Mehdi stop in Paris on his way to La Réunion. The French services clandestinely helped him to have a visa, while the Germans monitored calls and contacts. On June 1, 2003, he was arrested by French authorities at Charles de Gaulle Airport and sent to Fresnes Prison. Two days later, Ganczarski was also there.

Following interrogations of both men, investigators suspected that they had links with the Hamburg cell, which plotted the September 11 attacks. Interior Minister Nicolas Sarkozy implicitly referred to Alliance Base on June 11, 2003, declaring to the National Assembly that "This arrest took place thanks to the perfect collaboration between the services of the great democracies."

== See also ==
- Abu Ali al-Harithi, shot in Yemen with six others by a Predator drone commanded from CIA headquarters in Langley, VA., and based at Combined Joint Task Force – Horn of Africa, hosted at a French military base in Djibouti.
- Franco-American relations
