= Christian Ganczarski =

German al-Qaeda member

Christian Ganczarski (born 1966, in Gliwice, Poland) is a German terrorist who was alleged to be a top Al-Qaeda leader.

== Background ==
Ganczarski is a convert to Islam, and is of Polish ancestry. He is thought to have been involved in jihadist activities in Afghanistan and Bosnia.

== 2002 Ghriba synagogue bombing ==
=== Attack ===
Early on the morning of April 11, 2002 Niser bin Muhammad Nasar Nawar and a colleague drove a truck loaded with natural gas canisters behind a German tourist bus near the El Ghriba synagogue on Djerba island, Tunisia. Nawar then used a cell phone belonging to his brother to phone Khalid Sheikh Mohammed and Ganczarski. After his colleague fled the scene on foot, Nawar detonated the explosives, killing 14 German tourists, three Tunisians and two French nationals.

=== Arrest and criminal proceedings ===
The Alliance Base arrested Ganczarski at Charles de Gaulle Airport in June 2003 for his alleged involvement in the attack.

In February 2009, a French court sentenced Ganczarski to 18 years in prison for the Djerba bombing. Ganczarski is said to have given Nawar the green light to carry out the attack during the phone call before the bombing.

In January 2018, after hearing he may face extradition to the United States in connection with investigations of September 11 attacks, he injured three French prison guards with a blade in Vendin-le-Vieil prison. Prosecutors announced on 17 January 2018 that he was charged with conspiring to kill Americans, supporting terrorists as well as other crimes in Southern District of New York.
