= Geoff Morrell (spokesperson) =

American public affairs official (born 1968)

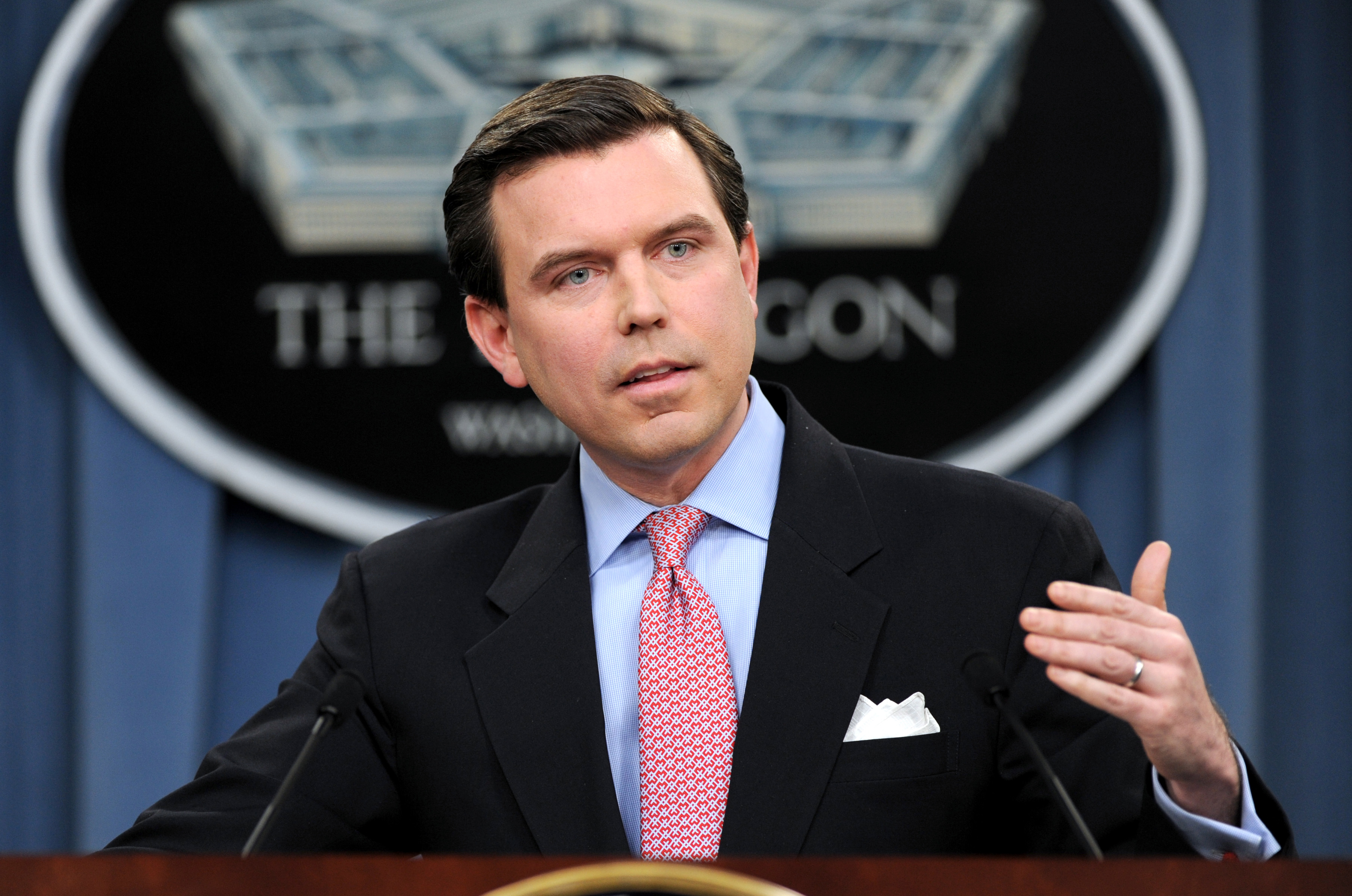
- Morrell gives a briefing at the Pentagon on March 25, 2009.
- Born: 1968 (age 57–58); United States
- Education: The Lawrenceville School
- Alma mater: Georgetown University; Columbia University
- Occupation: chief corporate affairs officer
- Years active: 1992–present

Pentagon Press Secretary/Deputy Assistant Secretary of Defense for Public Affairs
- In office 2007–2011
- President: George W. Bush; Barack Obama

ABC News White House Correspondent
- In office 2000–2007

Geoffrey S. Morrell (born November 1968) is the president of Global Strategy & Communications at Teneo, a public relations and advisory firm. In 2022, he was the Chief Corporate Affairs Officer at Disney for three months before resigning. He served as the Executive Vice President of Communications and Advocacy at BP from 2011 to 2021. From 2007 to 2011, he was the Deputy Assistant Secretary of Defense for Public Affairs and the press secretary for the U.S. Department of Defense.

== Early life and education ==
Morrell graduated from the Lawrenceville School in 1987, then earned a bachelor's degree in 1991 from Georgetown University and a master's degree in journalism in 1992 from Columbia University.

== Professional career ==
Morrell began his reporting career in 1992 at KATV-TV in Little Rock, Arkansas, covering the presidential campaign of Bill Clinton. He worked as a reporter at WSET-TV in Lynchburg/Roanoke in 1994; at KSAZ-TV in Phoenix in 1995; and at WBBM-TV in Chicago in 1996. While working as for WBBM-TV, Morrell played himself in the 1998 movie The Negotiator.

Morrell left WBBM-TV in early 2000 and joined ABC News, working in the network's Chicago and Washington, D.C., bureaus. He was an ABC White House television correspondent for four years. In 2007, Morrell resigned from ABC to be appointed the Deputy Assistant Secretary of Defense for Public Affairs, where he served under two presidents. Morrell resigned upon Secretary Robert Gates' retirement in July 2011 and was replaced by George E. Little.

In September 2011, Morrell joined BP as a vice-president and the company's head of U.S. communications. Two years later, he became the company's senior vice president of U.S. communications and external affairs; he was in charge of government and media relations, internal communications, community affairs and philanthropy in the U.S.

In 2017, he moved to London to become head of group communications and external affairs, leading BP's global government media relations, internal communications, and community affairs. In 2020, Morrell was appointed Executive Vice President of Communications and Advocacy at BP.

In January 2022, Morrell left BP to oversee “communications, government relations, public policy, philanthropy and environmental issues” as Disney's Chief Corporate Affairs Officer. During his tenure, Disney had become embroiled in a dispute with Florida's Governor Ron DeSantis and the Florida laws regarding parental educational rights and teaching of gender identity: Florida had enacted a law requiring the termination of Disney's special self-governing tax and improvement district that governed 25,000 acres of Disney World. Morell resigned from Disney on April 29, 2022, saying that "for a number of reasons it is not the right fit" and that he would "pursue other opportunities". During his three-month stint at Disney, he was paid over $10 million.
