= Nicolò Pollari =

Italian general

Nicolò Pollari (born 3 March 1943 in Caltanissetta) is a general of the Italian Guardia di Finanza, who was the head of Italy's national military intelligence agency, or SISMI, from 1 October 2001 until his resignation on 20 November 2006. He assisted in the CIA kidnapping of a cleric to be sent to Egypt for torture, for which he was convicted in 2013 to a 10-year jail sentence, which was overturned in 2014 upon appeal to Italy's Supreme Court of Cassation. He is claimed to have earlier supported the US efforts to justify the invasion of Iraq by providing false documents.

== Niger uranium forgeries ==
In a 2005 article in the newspaper La Repubblica, Pollari was identified by investigative reporters Giuseppe D'Avanzo and Carlo Bonini, as having brought the discredited documents at the centre of the Yellowcake forgery scandal directly to Vice-President Dick Cheney's Office of Special Plans, bypassing the CIA, who knew the documents were forgeries.

== Abu Omar case ==
On 5 December 2006, his indictment was sought for his role in the abduction of Egyptian cleric Hassan Mustafa Osama Nasr from the streets of Milan on 17 February 2003. Marco Mancini, number two of the SISMI, as well as number three, General Gustavo Pignero, were also indicted, and arrested, in July 2006, for their role in the Abu Omar case, as well as 26 American citizens. On 12 February 2013, Pollari was sentenced to ten years in prison by the Appeals Court of Milan. The sentence was overturned on 24 February 2014.

== Mitrokhin Commission ==
According to the Italian public prosecutor Pietro Salvitti, cited by La Repubblica, Pollari and Marco Mancini were some of the informers, alongside Mario Scaramella, of senator Paolo Guzzanti, in charge of the controversial Mitrokhin Commission. Scaramella was arrested at the end of December 2006 on charges of defamation and arms trade. The Mitrokhin Commission falsely claimed that former Italian prime minister Romano Prodi had been the "KGB's man in Italy" during the Cold War. According to Salvitti, beside targeting Prodi and his staff, this "network" also aimed at defaming General Giuseppe Cucchi (the director of the CESIS), Milan's judges Armando Spataro in charge of the Abu Omar case, and Guido Salvini, as well as La Repubblica reporters Carlo Bonini and Giuseppe D'Avanzo.
