= Robert Seldon Lady =

American intelligence officer

- Born: February 2, 1954 (age 72); Tegucigalpa, Honduras
- Other name: "Mister Bob"
- Occupation: CIA agent
- Known for: Kidnapping of Hassan Mustafa Osama Nasr and subsequent conviction

Robert Seldon Lady (born February 2, 1954, in Tegucigalpa, Honduras; nicknamed "Mister Bob") is an American intelligence officer. Lady was the CIA's station chief in Milan during the Abu Omar case.

For his role in the case, Italian authorities issued an arrest warrant. He was arrested in Panama in 2013 and released the next day. In 2015, Italian President Sergio Mattarella granted Lady a partial pardon.

== Background ==
Lady grew up in Honduras and became a New Orleans Police Department police officer in the 1970s.

== The Imam Rapito affair ==
Italian authorities proved in court that in 2003, Lady helped a team of CIA agents kidnap Nasr (see extraordinary rendition) as he walked to his mosque in Milan for noon prayers. Lady is said to have travelled to Egypt soon after the operation, where Nasr was interrogated and tortured.

Lady initially claimed diplomatic immunity in an effort to avoid judicial proceedings against him in Italy, but in November 2005, an Italian judge rejected this request, stating that Lady had forfeited his immunity when he retired from the CIA, and also that the alleged abduction was in any case a crime serious enough to disqualify him from immunity.

Lady, and his wife Martha, retired to northern Italy, near Asti, in September 2003. When the Italian police raided his home in June 2005, Lady was not there. The wall street journal reports he lives in Miami, FL United States.

=== 2007 indictment ===
In January 2007, an Italian court ordered Lady's home in the Piedmont region of Northern Italy seized to cover court costs.

On February 16, 2007, an arrest warrant was issued for Lady for the kidnapping of Abu Omar. An Italian prosecutor, Armando Spataro, was scheduled to begin trying the case in June 2007. Lady's Italian lawyer, Daria Pesce, withdrew from the case shortly after the beginning of legal proceedings, saying her client refused to cooperate with the court proceedings because he believed the matter should be settled through a political, rather than legal solution. Lady dismissed his attorney soon afterwards, although the court in Milan appointed a public defense attorney for him. The trial against Lady and the other US defendants began in absentia later that month, although it was quickly adjourned until October 2007.

In an interview with GQ Magazine in March 2007, Lady said of his superiors at the CIA that "the agency has told me to keep quiet and let this blow over."

== 2009 interview ==
In June 2009, Robert Seldon Lady was quoted by Il Giornale as saying of the kidnapping,

I'm not guilty. I'm only responsible for carrying out orders that I received from my superiors ... When you work in intelligence, you do things in the country in which you work that are not legal. It's a life of illegality ... But state institutions in the whole world have professionals in my sector, and it's up to us to do our duty.

He said of Abu Omar's abduction, "Of course it was an illegal operation. But that's our job. We're at war against terrorism."

== 2009 conviction ==
On November 4, 2009, Italian Judge Oscar Magi convicted Lady, along with 22 other accused CIA employees, of kidnapping, and sentenced him to eight years. The New York Times called this decision a "landmark ruling" and an "enormous symbolic victory" for Italian prosecutors because it "was the first ever to contest the United States practice of rendition, in which terrorism suspects are captured in one country and taken for questioning in another, presumably one more open to coercive interrogation techniques."

On July 18, 2013, according to the Italian Justice Ministry, Lady was arrested in Panama. He was released the next day.

== 2015 pardon ==
In December 2015, the President of Italy Sergio Mattarella granted a partial pardon to Lady.

== See also ==
- The CIA and the Cult of Intelligence, a 1974 book on the culture of lawlessness in the CIA.
- Eliana Castaldo
- Joseph L. Romano
