= Niger uranium forgeries =

Forged documents in the Iraq disarmament crisis

Location of Niger in Africa

The Niger uranium forgeries were forged documents initially released in 2001 by SISMI (the former military intelligence agency of Italy), which seem to depict an attempt made by Saddam Hussein in Iraq to purchase uranium in the form of yellowcake powder from Niger during the Iraq disarmament crisis. On the basis of these documents and other indicators, the governments of the United States and the United Kingdom asserted that Iraq violated United Nations sanctions against Iraq by attempting to procure nuclear material for the purpose of creating weapons of mass destruction.

== Abbreviated timetable ==
The first report of these documents was in a Central Intelligence Agency (CIA) Senior Executive Intelligence brief dated 18 October 2001, entitled: "Iraq: Nuclear Related Procurement Efforts". This information was not considered to be certain and not much was done to promote this claim right away.

These documents were sent to the CIA office in Rome by SISMI.

On 10 May 2002, the CIA's Office of Near Eastern and South Asian Analysis (NESA) in the Directorate of Intelligence (DI) prepared a Principals Committee briefing book updating the status of Iraqi weapons of mass destruction (WMD) programs. The document noted that a "foreign government service says Iraq was trying to acquire 500 tons of uranium from Niger".

On 22 July 2002, the United States Department of Energy (DOE) published an intelligence product ("Daily Intelligence Highlight, Nuclear Reconstitution Efforts Underway?") which highlighted the intelligence on the Iraq-Niger uranium deal as one of three indications that Iraq might be reconstituting its nuclear program.

=== Second and third dissemination ===
There was a second and third dissemination of these forged documents to the United States by SISMI in early September 2002. One source was a suspicious "ex-agent" of SISMI who occasionally worked on and off for them, who was selling the documents.

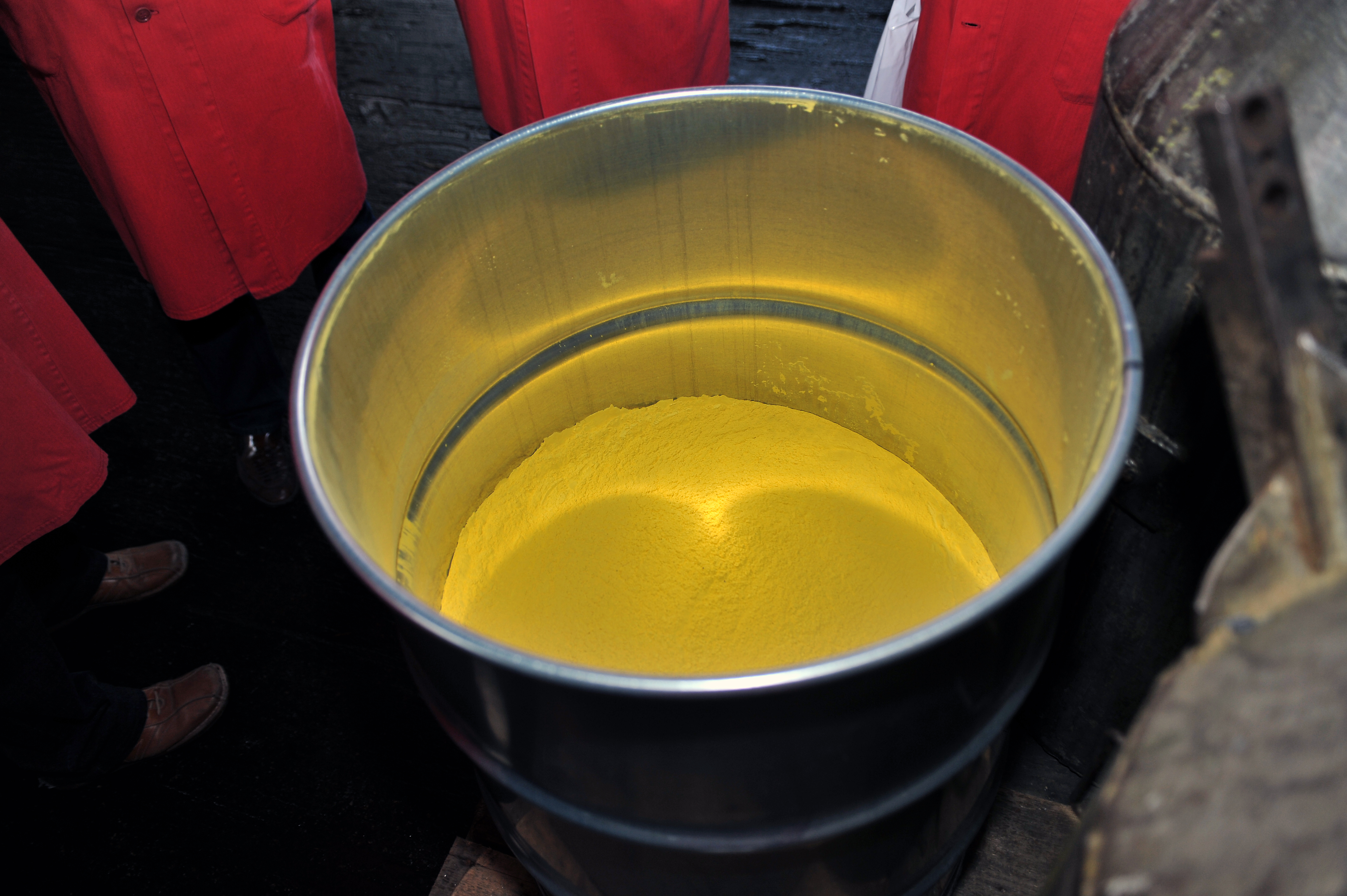
Yellowcake powder

Far more officially, Nicolò Pollari, chief of SISMI, brought the Niger yellowcake story directly to the White House, meeting secretly in Washington on 9 September 2002, with then–Deputy National Security Advisor Stephen Hadley. In that month, the claims of Saddam trying to buy yellowcake uranium from Niger became much stronger. In September 2002, the Defense Intelligence Agency (DIA) published an intelligence assessment ("Defense Intelligence Assessment, Iraq's Reemerging Nuclear Program") which outlined Iraq's recent efforts to rebuild its nuclear program including uranium acquisition. On this issue, the assessment said "Iraq has been vigorously trying to procure uranium ore and yellowcake."

On 11 September 2002, National Security Council (NSC) staff contacted the CIA to clear language for possible use by President Bush. The language cleared by the CIA said, "Iraq has made several attempts to buy high strength aluminum tubes used in centrifuges to enrich uranium for nuclear weapons. And we also know this: within the past few years, Iraq has resumed efforts to obtain large quantities of a type of uranium oxide known as yellowcake, which is an essential ingredient of this process."

In October 2002 the Intelligence Community (IC) produced a classified, 90-page National Intelligence Estimate (NIE) on Iraq's WMD programmes which cited reports that Iraq began "vigorously trying to procure" more uranium from Niger, as well as Somalia and the Democratic Republic of the Congo.

Yellowcake and Niger were not specifically mentioned in this speech. There are many reports of a struggle about this, saying the Niger uranium claims were initially in this Cincinnati speech but taken out by the insistence of the CIA Director George Tenet.

== Iraq and WMD ==
In late 2002, the Bush administration began soliciting support for war in Iraq using the political slogan "coalition of the willing" to refer to what later became the Multinational Force – Iraq. To back up its claim that Iraq possessed weapons of mass destruction, that administration referred to intelligence from Italy, Britain, and France detailing interactions between Saddam Hussein and the governments of Niger, Somalia, and the Democratic Republic of Congo. Specifically, CIA director George Tenet and United States Secretary of State Colin Powell both cited attempts by Hussein to obtain uranium from Niger in their September testimony before the Senate Foreign Relations Committee. At that time, using information derived from the same source, the UK government also publicly reported an attempted purchase from an (unnamed) "African country". In December, the United States Department of State issued a fact sheet listing the alleged Niger yellowcake affair in a report entitled "Illustrative Examples of Omissions From the Iraqi Declaration to the United Nations Security Council".

== Initial doubts ==
The classified documents detailing an Iraqi approach to purchase yellowcake uranium from Niger were considered dubious by some analysts in US intelligence, according to news accounts. Days before the Iraq invasion, the International Atomic Energy Agency (IAEA) voiced serious doubt on the authenticity of the documents to the UN Security Council, judging them to be counterfeit.

== "Sixteen Words" controversy in 2003 State of the Union ==
In his January 2003 State of the Union speech, U.S. President George W. Bush said, "The British government has learned that Saddam Hussein recently sought significant quantities of uranium from Africa." This single sentence is now known as "the Sixteen Words". The administration later conceded that evidence in support of the claim was inconclusive and stated, "These sixteen words should never have been included." The administration attributed the error to the CIA. In mid-2003, the US government declassified the 2002 NIE, which contained a dissenting opinion published by the US Department of State stating that the intelligence connecting Niger to Saddam Hussein was "highly suspect", primarily because State Department's intelligence agency analysts did not believe that Niger would be likely to engage in such a transaction due to a French consortium which maintained close control over the Nigerien uranium industry.

According to The Washington Post, when occupying troops found no evidence of a current nuclear program, the statement and how it came to be in the speech became a focus for critics in Washington and foreign capitals to press the case that the White House manipulated facts to take the United States to war. The Post reported, "Dozens of interviews with current and former intelligence officials and policymakers in the United States, Britain, France and Italy show that the Bush administration disregarded key information available at the time showing that the Iraq–Niger claim was highly questionable." With the release of the 2002 NIE report, the Bush administration was criticized for including the statement in the State of the Union address despite CIA and State Department reports questioning its veracity.

== European and French intelligence reports ==
The front page of the 28 June 2004 Financial Times carried a report from their national security correspondent, Mark Huband, describing that between 1999 and 2001, three unnamed European intelligence services were aware that Niger was possibly engaged in illicit negotiations over the export of its uranium ore with North Korea, Libya, Iraq, Iran, and China. "The same information was passed to the US" but American officials decided not to include it in their assessment, Huband added in a follow-up report.

French intelligence informed the United States a year before President Bush's State of the Union address that the allegation could not be supported with hard evidence.

The Sunday Times dated 1 August 2004 contains an interview with an Italian source describing his role in the forgeries. The source said he was sorry to have played a role in passing along false intelligence.

Although the claims made in the British intelligence report regarding Iraq's interest in yellowcake ore from Niger were never withdrawn, the CIA and Department of State could not verify them and are said to have thought the claims were "highly dubious".

== US doubts ==
Previously, in February 2002, three different American officials had made efforts to verify the reports. The deputy commander of US Armed Forces Europe, Marine General Carlton W. Fulford, Jr., went to Niger and met with the country's president, Tandja Mamadou. He concluded that, given the controls on Niger's uranium supply, there was little chance any of it could have been diverted to Iraq. His report was sent to the Chairman of the Joint Chiefs of Staff, Gen. Richard Myers. The US Ambassador to Niger, Barbro Owens-Kirkpatrick, was also present at the meeting and sent similar conclusions to the State Department. CNN reported on 14 March 2003 (before the invasion) that the Director General of the International Atomic Energy Agency (IAEA) said the documents were "obvious" forgeries.

== Wilson and Niger ==
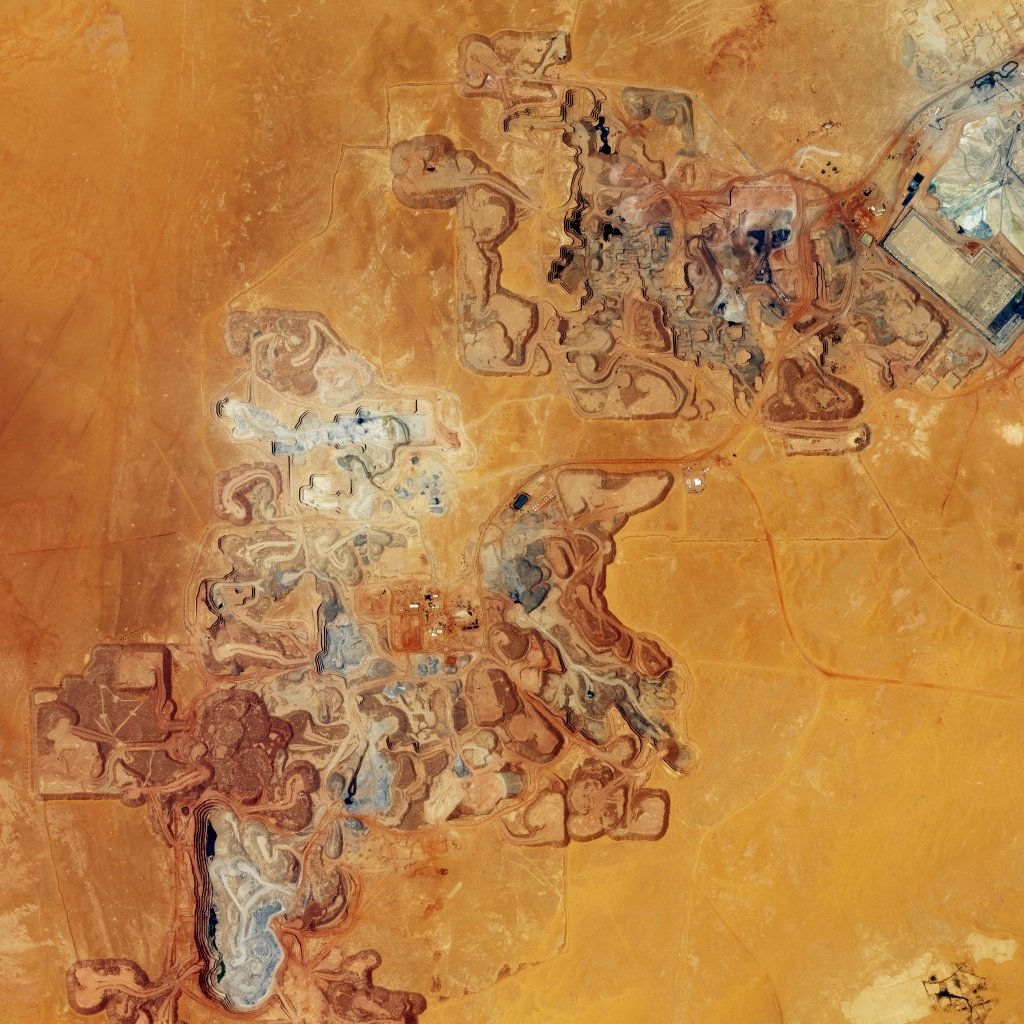
Aerial view of a uranium mine in Niger

In late February 2002, the CIA sent Ambassador Joseph Wilson to investigate the claims himself. Wilson had been posted to Niger 14 years earlier, and throughout a diplomatic career in Africa he had built up a large network of contacts in Niger. Wilson interviewed former prime minister of Niger, Ibrahim Assane Mayaki, who reported that he knew of no attempted sales to Iraq. Mayaki did however recall that in June 1999 an Iraqi delegation had expressed interest in "expanding commercial relations", which he had interpreted to mean yellowcake sales. Ultimately, Wilson concluded that there was no way that production at the uranium mines could be ramped up or that the excess uranium could have been exported without it being immediately obvious to many people both in the private sector and in the government of Niger. He returned home and told the CIA that the reports were "unequivocally wrong". The CIA retained this information in its Counter Proliferation Department and it was not passed up to the CIA Director, according to the unanimous findings of the bipartisan Senate Intelligence Committee's July 2004 report.

=== Criticism ===
Former Ambassador Wilson had claimed that he found no evidence of Saddam Hussein ever attempting or buying yellowcake uranium from Niger on his trip to Niger.

The Senate Select Committee on Intelligence suggested that the evidence Wilson found could be interpreted differently:

[Wilson's] intelligence report indicated that former Nigerien Prime Minister Ibrahim Mayaki was unaware of any contracts that had been signed between Niger and any rogue states for the sale of yellowcake while he was Prime Minister (1997–1999) or Foreign Minister (1996–1997). Mayaki said that if there had been any such contract during his tenure, he would have been aware of it. Mayaki said, however, that in June 1999, (REDACTED) businessman, approached him and insisted that Mayaki meet with an Iraqi delegation to discuss "expanding commercial relations" between Niger and Iraq. The intelligence report said that Mayaki interpreted 'expanding commercial relations' to mean that the delegation wanted to discuss uranium yellowcake sales. The intelligence report also said that "although the meeting took place, Mayaki let the matter drop due to the UN sanctions on Iraq".

Wilson has responded to criticism by observing that uranium was not actually discussed at the 1999 meeting. On Meet the Press, for example, Wilson stated:

At that meeting, uranium was not discussed. It would be a tragedy to think that we went to war over a conversation in which uranium was not discussed because the Niger official was sufficiently sophisticated to think that perhaps he might have wanted to discuss uranium at some later date.

== Panorama article ==
Carlo Rossella, the editor of Panorama, published the documents during the third week of September 2002 and passed them to the American embassy in Rome in October 2002.

== CIA doubts ==
In early October 2002, George Tenet called Deputy National Security Adviser Stephen Hadley to ask him to remove reference to the Niger uranium from a speech Bush was to give in Cincinnati on 7 October. This was followed up by a memo asking Hadley to remove another, similar line. Another memo was sent to the White House expressing the CIA's view that the Niger claims were false; this memo was given to both Hadley and National Security Adviser Condoleezza Rice.

== Wilson and Plame ==
Retired ambassador Joseph C. Wilson wrote a critical op-ed in The New York Times in which he explained the nature of the documents and the government's prior knowledge of their unreliability for use in a case for war. Shortly after Wilson's op-ed, in a column by Robert Novak, in pondering why a State Department employee was dispatched rather than a trained CIA agent, the identity of Wilson's wife, CIA analyst Valerie Plame, was revealed. The Senate Intelligence Committee report and other sources confirm that Plame "offered his name up" to her superiors.

== IAEA analysis ==
Further, in March 2003, the Director General of the International Atomic Energy Agency (IAEA) released results of his analysis of the documents. Reportedly, it took IAEA officials only a matter of hours to determine that these documents were fake. IAEA experts discovered indications of a crude forgery, such as wrong dates and incorrect names of Nigerien officials. As a result, the IAEA reported to the U.N. Security Council that the documents were "in fact not authentic". The UN spokesman wrote:

The I.A.E.A. was able to review correspondence coming from various bodies of the government of Niger and to compare the form, format, contents and signature of that correspondence with those of the alleged procurement-related documentation. Based on thorough analysis, the I.A.E.A. has concluded, with the concurrence of outside experts, that these documents, which formed the basis for the reports of recent uranium transaction between Iraq and Niger, are in fact not authentic. We have therefore concluded that these specific allegations are unfounded.

== British inquiries ==
=== Foreign Affairs Committee ===
The first British investigation into this matter was conducted by the House of Commons Foreign Affairs Select Committee (FAC). The committee comprises fourteen Members of Parliament from government and opposition parties, and has permanent cross-party support. They examined and tested several key claims in the September Dossier, Iraq's Weapons of Mass Destruction: The Assessment of the British Government, including the topic of uranium acquisition.

In June and July, British Foreign Secretary Jack Straw testified that the claim in the dossier rested on separate evidence to the fraudulent documents, and that this specific intelligence, obtained from a foreign government, was still under review and had not been shared with the CIA. In written evidence to the same committee, Straw further disclosed that the separate intelligence information upon which the British Government had based its conclusion, was also briefed to the IAEA by a foreign intelligence service that owned the reporting, shortly before IAEA Director General Dr. Mohamed ElBaradei's statement to the UN Security Council on 7 March 2003. This was further confirmed in a parliamentary answer to Lynne Jones MP. Lynne Jones subsequently contacted the IAEA to question whether a third party had discussed or shared separate intelligence with them and, if so, what assessment they made of it. IAEA spokesman Mark Gwozdecky responded to Jones in May 2004:

I can confirm to you that we have received information from a number of member states regarding the allegation that Iraq sought to acquire uranium from Niger. However, we have learned nothing which would cause us to change the conclusion we reported to the United Nations Security Council on March 7, 2003 with regards to the documents assessed to be forgeries and have not received any information that would appear to be based on anything other than those documents.

After talking with numerous witnesses and considering much evidence, the committee judged the evidence that Iraq was trying to procure uranium was not sufficiently strong enough to justify absolute terms.

We conclude that it is very odd indeed that the Government asserts that it was not relying on the evidence which has since been shown to have been forged, but that eight months later it is still reviewing the other evidence. The assertion "... that Iraq sought the supply of significant amounts of uranium from Africa ..." should have been qualified to reflect the uncertainty.

=== Butler Committee ===
The Butler Committee, appointed by then Prime Minister Tony Blair, concluded that the report Saddam's government was seeking uranium in Africa appeared "well-founded":

1. It is accepted by all parties that Iraqi officials visited Niger in 1999.
2. The British government had intelligence from several different sources indicating that this visit was for the purpose of acquiring uranium. Since uranium constitutes almost three-quarters of Niger's exports, the intelligence was credible.
3. The evidence was not conclusive that Iraq actually purchased, as opposed to having sought, uranium, and the British government did not claim this.
4. The forged documents were not available to the British Government at the time its assessment was made, and so the fact of the forgery does not undermine it.

The review however was itself mired in controversy leading both opposition parties to end their participation and leaving Tony Blair's Labour Party as the only party involved with the review.

== More doubts ==
In January 2006, The New York Times revealed the existence of a memo which stated that the suggestion of uranium being sold was "unlikely" because of a host of economic, diplomatic and logistical obstacles. The memo, dated 4 March 2002, was distributed at senior levels by the office of former Secretary of State Colin L. Powell and by the Defense Intelligence Agency.

== Statements by Wilson ==
In a July 2003 op-ed, Ambassador Wilson recounted his experiences and stated "I have little choice but to conclude that some of the intelligence related to Iraq's nuclear weapons program was twisted to exaggerate the Iraqi threat".

Wilson told The Washington Post anonymously in June 2003 that he had concluded that the intelligence about the Niger uranium was based on the forged documents because "the dates were wrong and the names were wrong." However, the relevant papers were not in CIA hands until eight months after Wilson made his trip. Wilson had to backtrack and said he may have "misspoken" on this. The Senate intelligence committee, which examined pre-Iraq war intelligence, reported that Wilson "had never seen the CIA reports and had no knowledge of what names and dates were in the reports."

== Origin of forged documents ==
No one has been convicted of forging the documents. Various theories have been reported on how they were produced, distributed, and where pressure was applied to keep their fraudulent nature a secret.

=== Funneled through former Italian intelligence agent ===
By late 2003, the trail of the documents had been partially uncovered. They were obtained by a "security consultant" (and former agent of the precursor agency to SISMI, the SID), Rocco Martino, from Italian military intelligence (SISMI). An article in The Times (London) quoted Martino as having received the documents from a woman on the staff of the Niger embassy (located in a tiny apartment in Rome), after a meeting was arranged by a serving SISMI agent. Martino later recanted and said he had been misquoted, and that SISMI had not facilitated the meeting where he obtained the documents. It was later revealed that Martino had been invited to serve as the conduit for the documents by Col. Antonio Nucera of SISMI, the head of the counterintelligence and WMD proliferations sections of SISMI's Rome operations center.

Martino, in turn, offered them to Italian journalist Elisabetta Burba. On instructions from her editor at Panorama, Burba offered them to the U.S. Embassy in Rome in October 2002. Burba was dissuaded by the editors of the Berlusconi-owned Panorama from investigating the source of the forgeries.

An August 2004 Financial Times article indicated French officials may have had a role in the forged documents coming to light. The article states:

According to senior European officials, in 1999 [Rocco Martino] provided French officials with genuine documents which revealed Iraq may have been planning to expand 'trade' with Niger. This trade was assumed to be in uranium, which is Niger's main export. It was then that Mr Martino first became aware of the value of documents relating to Niger's uranium exports. He was then asked by French officials to provide more information, which led to a flourishing 'market' in documents. He subsequently provided France with more documents, which turned out to have been forged when they were handed to the International Atomic Energy Agency by U.S. diplomats.

The Times article also stated that "French officials have not said whether they know Mr Martino, and are unlikely to either confirm or deny that he is a source".

=== Current or former United States Executive Branch employees ===
It is as yet unknown how Italian intelligence came by the documents and why they were not given directly to the US. According to a 2003 article in The New Yorker by Seymour Hersh, the forgery may have been a deliberate entrapment by current and former CIA officers to settle a score against Cheney and other neoconservatives. Hersh recounts how a former officer told him that "somebody deliberately let something false get in there." Hersh continues:

He became more forthcoming in subsequent months, eventually saying that a small group of disgruntled retired C.I.A. clandestine operators had banded together in the late summer of last year and drafted the fraudulent documents themselves.

"The agency guys were so pissed at Cheney", the former officer said. "They said, 'O.K, we're going to put the bite on these guys.'" My source said that he was first told of the fabrication late last year, at one of the many holiday gatherings in the Washington area of past and present C.I.A. officials. "Everyone was bragging about it—'Here's what we did. It was cool, cool, cool.'" These retirees, he said, had superb contacts among current officers in the agency and were informed in detail of the sismi intelligence.

In an interview published 7 April 2005, Cannistraro was asked by Ian Masters what he would say if it were asserted that the source of the forgery was former National Security Council and State Department consultant Michael Ledeen. (Ledeen had also allegedly been a liaison between the United States Intelligence Community and SISMI two decades earlier.) Cannistraro answered by saying: "you'd be very close". Ledeen has denied this in an article which mentions, though, that he has worked for the aforementioned Panorama magazine.

In an interview on 26 July 2005, Cannistraro's business partner and columnist for the American Conservative magazine, former CIA counter terrorism officer Philip Giraldi, confirmed to Scott Horton that the forgeries were produced by "a couple of former CIA officers who are familiar with that part of the world who are associated with a certain well-known neoconservative who has close connections with Italy". When Horton said that must be Ledeen, he confirmed it, and added that the ex-CIA officers "also had some equity interests, shall we say, with the operation. A lot of these people are in consulting positions, and they get various, shall we say, emoluments in overseas accounts, and that kind of thing".

In a second interview with Horton, Giraldi elaborated to say that Ledeen and his former CIA friends worked with Ahmad Chalabi and the Iraqi National Congress. "These people did it probably for a couple of reasons, but one of the reasons was that these people were involved, through the neoconservatives, with the Iraqi National Congress and Chalabi and had a financial interest in cranking up the pressure against Saddam Hussein and potentially going to war with him."

=== Current and former Italian intelligence employees ===
The suggestion of a plot by CIA officers is countered by a series of articles in the Italian newspaper La Repubblica. Investigative reporters Carlo Bonini and Giuseppe d'Avanzo report that Nicolò Pollari, chief of Italy's military intelligence service, SISMI, brought the Niger yellowcake story directly to the White House after his insistent overtures had been rejected by the Central Intelligence Agency in 2001 and 2002. SISMI had reported to the CIA on 15 October 2001, that Iraq had sought yellowcake in Niger, a report it also plied on British intelligence, creating an echo that the Niger forgeries themselves purported to amplify before they were exposed as a hoax.

Pollari met secretly in Washington on 9 September 2002, with then–Deputy National Security Advisor Stephen Hadley. Their secret meeting came at a critical moment in the White House campaign to convince Congress and the American public that war in Iraq was necessary to prevent Saddam Hussein from developing nuclear weapons. What may be most significant to American observers, however, is La Repubblica's allegation that the Italians sent the bogus intelligence about Niger and Iraq not only through traditional allied channels such as the CIA, but seemingly directly into the White House. That direct White House channel amplifies questions about the 16-word reference to the uranium from Africa in President Bush's 2003 State of the Union address—which remained in the speech despite warnings from the CIA and the State Department that the allegation was not substantiated.

== Aftermath ==
In March 2003, Senator Jay Rockefeller, vice-chairman of the Senate Select Committee on Intelligence, agreed not to open a congressional investigation of the matter, but rather asked the Federal Bureau of Investigation (FBI) to conduct the investigation.

In 2003, unidentified "senior officials" in the administration leaked word to columnist Robert Novak that Wilson's wife, Valerie Plame, was a CIA operative. The CIA requested an investigation into whether this public disclosure was illegal, thus the Niger uranium controversy spawned an ongoing legal investigation and political scandal.

In September 2004, the CBS News program 60 Minutes decided to delay a major story on the forgeries because such a broadcast might influence the 2004 U.S. presidential election. A CBS spokesman stated, "We now believe it would be inappropriate to air the report so close to the presidential election." This decision closely followed the Killian documents controversy.

Nicolò Pollari, director of the SISMI intelligence agency, told an Italian parliamentary intelligence committee that the dossier came from Rocco Martino, a former Italian spy.

The Los Angeles Times reported on 3 December 2005, that the FBI reopened the inquiry into "how the Bush administration came to rely on forged documents linking Iraq to nuclear weapons materials as part of its justification for the invasion." According to the Times, "a senior FBI official said the bureau's initial investigation found no evidence of foreign government involvement in the forgeries, but the FBI did not interview Martino, a central figure in a parallel drama unfolding in Rome."

=== Removal of known yellowcake ===
In 2008, the United States facilitated shipping yellowcake (refined uranium ore) out of Iraq. This yellowcake had been stockpiled prior to the first Gulf War, and was declared to the International Atomic Energy Agency and under IAEA safeguards. More than 550 tons of yellowcake was removed from Iraq and eventually shipped to Canada.

== See also ==
- 2003 invasion of Iraq
- Bush–Aznar memo
- Casus belli
- Curveball (informant)
- Downing Street memo
- Fair Game (2010 film)
- Fog of war
- Hussein Kamel al-Majid
- Iraqi aluminum tubes
- Iraq disarmament crisis
- 2004 Iraq document leak
- List of uranium projects
- Allegations of Iraqi mobile weapons laboratories
- Plame affair
- Operation Rockingham
- Scott Ritter
- September Dossier
