= Marco Mancini =

Italian secret agent (born 1960)

Brigadier Marco Mancini
- Born: October 4, 1960 (age 66)
- Military career
- Branch: Carabinieri, then SISMI
- Service years: 1979 - 2021

Marco Mancini (born 3 October 1960) is an Italian former secret agent who was a member of the Carabinieri and the Dipartimento delle Informazioni per la Sicurezza (DIS). He was also the second-highest-ranking officer of SISMI, the military intelligence agency of Italy, until his 5 July 2006 arrest for his participation in the kidnapping of Hassan Mustafa Osama Nasr (the Imam Rapito case). He was then indicted a second time on 13 December 2006 for his role in the SISMI-Telecom scandal.

== Career and SISMI-Telecom scandal ==
Born in Castel San Pietro Terme, Mancini led the anti-terrorist division of the Italian secret service. Mancini was arrested alongside his superior, General Gustavo Pignero, on 5 July 2006. The investigations directed by Milan's public prosecutor Armando Spataro demonstrated that Mancini proposed himself to the CIA as a double agent. According to Colonel Stefano D'Ambrosio's testimony to the Italian justice, the CIA refused because they considered him too "venal". His demand "left traces in the computer" of the U.S. intelligence.

All SISMI testimonies concurred in saying that Mancini owed his dazzling career (he was a non-commissioned officer) to his "privileged relations with the CIA". According to SISMI testimony, after the 17 February 2003 kidnapping of Hassan Mustafa Nasr, the then CIA director George Tenet sent a letter to SISMI General Nicolò Pollari in August 2003, to which he would owe, according to SISMI testimony, the real reasons of his promotion. On 12 February 2013, he was sentenced to a 9-year jail term by the Milano Court of Appeals.
