= History of the Italian Republic =

History of Italy since 1946

The history of the Italian Republic concerns the events relating to the history of Italy that have occurred since 1946, when Italy became a republic after the 1946 Italian institutional referendum. The Italian republican history is generally divided into two phases, the First and Second Republic.

After the fall of the Fascist regime in Italy and the end of World War II, Italian politics and society were dominated by Christian Democracy (DC), a broad-based Christian political party, from 1946 to 1994. From the late 1940s until 1991, the opposition was led by the Italian Communist Party (PCI). Christian Democracy governed uninterrupted during this period, dominating every cabinet and providing nearly every prime minister. It governed primarily with the support of an array of minor parties from the centre-left to the centre-right, including the Italian Socialist Party (PSI), Italian Democratic Socialist Party (PSDI), Italian Republican Party (PRI), and Italian Liberal Party (PLI), and even far-right parties like the Italian Social Movement (MSI). The Communist Party was excluded entirely from government, with the partial exception of the short-lived Historic Compromise, in which the PCI provided external support to a DC minority government from 1976 to 1979.

The political situation was radically transformed in the early 1990s due to two major shocks: the dissolution of the Soviet Union in 1991 and the wide-reaching Tangentopoli corruption scandal from 1992 to 1994. The former caused the dissolution and split of the PCI and splintering of the opposition, while the latter led to the collapse of nearly every established political party in Italy, including Christian Democracy, the PSI, PSDI, PRI, PLI, and others. Anti-establishment sentiment resulted in a 1993 referendum enabling the reform of the electoral system from pure proportional representation to a majoritarian-leaning mixed system.

Media magnate Silvio Berlusconi entered politics with his conservative Forza Italia party and won the 1994 general election, forming the short-lived Berlusconi I Cabinet. He went on to become one of Italy's most important figures over the next two decades, serving as prime minister again from 2001 to 2006 and 2008 to 2011. The rise of the new conservative right saw the old centre and left consolidate into the Olive Tree coalition, comprising the post-Communist Democrats of the Left and Christian democratic The Daisy, which together founded the Democratic Party (PD) in 2007. They competed against Berlusconi's centre-right coalition, comprising Forza Italia, the right-wing National Alliance, and northern Italian regionalist Northern League.

The collapse of Berlusconi's fourth cabinet in 2011 resulted in the formation of the technocratic Monti Cabinet until 2013. Enduring dissatisfaction saw the rise of the populist Five Star Movement (M5S) and the Northern League (rebranded League, Lega). After the Italian general elections of 2013 and 2018, grand coalition governments were formed, this time with the participation of populist parties. The COVID-19 pandemic and its associated economic issues brought about a government of national unity led by Mario Draghi, the former president of the European Central Bank.

== Background ==
=== Republican ideas and the unification of Italy ===
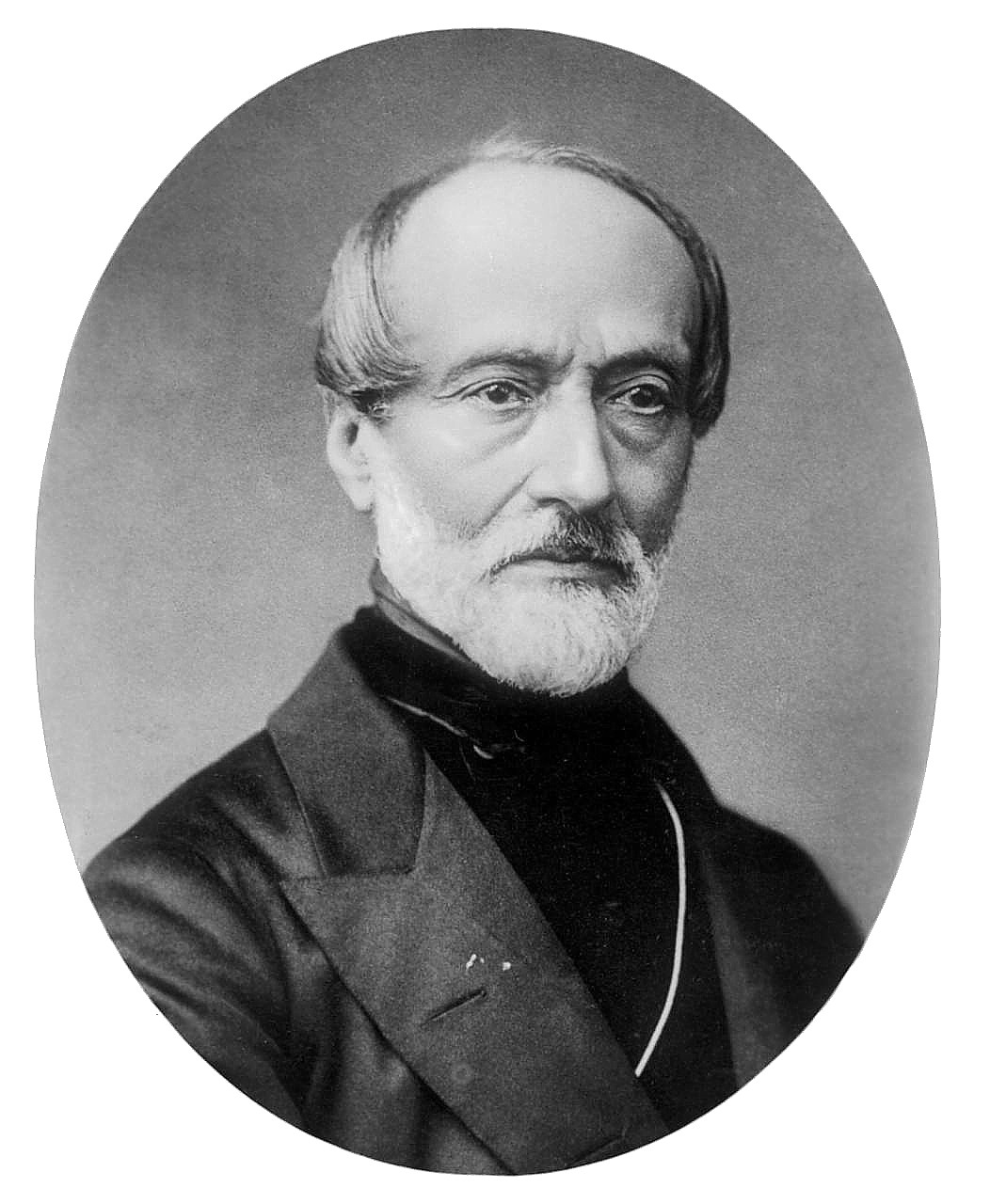
Giuseppe Mazzini. His thoughts influenced many politicians of a later period, among them Woodrow Wilson, David Lloyd George, Mahatma Gandhi, Golda Meir and Jawaharlal Nehru.

In the history of Italy there are several so-called "republican" governments that have followed one another over time. Examples are the ancient Roman Republic and the medieval maritime republics. From Cicero to Niccolò Machiavelli, Italian philosophers have imagined the foundations of political science and republicanism. (Note: Jean-Jacques Rousseau notes, in The Social Contract, about Niccolò Machiavelli and his work The Prince: "Pretending to give lessons to kings, he gave great lessons to the people. The Prince is the book of the republicans." (see Rousseau - Du Contrat social éd. Beaulavon 1903.djvu/237 - Wikisource.) But it was Giuseppe Mazzini who revived the republican idea in Italy in the 19th century.

An Italian nationalist in the historical radical tradition and a proponent of a republicanism of social-democratic inspiration, Mazzini helped define the modern European movement for popular democracy in a republican state. Mazzini's thoughts had a very considerable influence on the Italian and European republican movements, in the Constitution of Italy, about Europeanism and more nuanced on many politicians of a later period, among them American president Woodrow Wilson, British prime minister David Lloyd George, Mahatma Gandhi, Israeli prime minister Golda Meir and Indian prime minister Jawaharlal Nehru. Mazzini formulated a concept known as "thought and action" in which thought and action must be joined and every thought must be followed by action, therefore rejecting intellectualism and the notion of divorcing theory from practice.

In July 1831, in exile in Marseille, Giuseppe Mazzini founded the Young Italy movement, which aimed to transform Italy into a unitary democratic republic, according to the principles of freedom, independence and unity, but also to oust the monarchic regimes pre-existing the unification, including the Kingdom of Sardinia. The foundation of the Young Italy constitutes a key moment of the Italian Risorgimento and this republican program precedes in time the proposals for the unification of Italy of Vincenzo Gioberti and Cesare Balbo, aimed at reunifying the Italian territory under the presidency of the Pope. Subsequently, the philosopher Carlo Cattaneo promoted a secular and republican Italy in the extension of Mazzini's ideas, but organized as a federal republic.

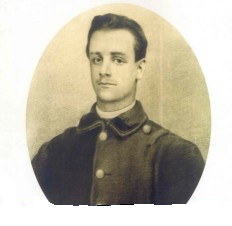
Pietro Barsanti, the first martyr of the modern Italian Republic

The political projects of Mazzini and Cattaneo were thwarted by the action of the Piedmontese Prime Minister Camillo Benso, Count of Cavour, and Giuseppe Garibaldi. The latter set aside his republican ideas to favor Italian unity. After having obtained the conquest of the whole of southern Italy during the Expedition of the Thousand, Garibaldi handed over the conquered territories to the king of Sardinia Victor Emmanuel II, which were annexed to the Kingdom of Sardinia after a plebiscite. This earned him heavy criticism from numerous republicans who accused him of treason. While a laborious administrative unification began, a first Italian parliament was elected and, on 17 March 1861, Victor Emmanuel II was proclaimed king of Italy.

From 1861 to 1946, Italy was a constitutional monarchy founded on the Albertine Statute, named after the king who promulgated it in 1848, Charles Albert of Sardinia. The parliament included a Senate, whose members were appointed by the king, and a Chamber of Deputies, elected by census vote. In 1861 only 2% of Italians had the right to vote. In the political panorama of the time there was a republican political movement which had its martyrs, such as the soldier Pietro Barsanti. Barsanti was a supporter of republican ideas, and was a soldier in the Royal Italian Army with the rank of corporal. He was sentenced to death and shot in 1870 for having favored an insurrectional attempt against the Savoy monarchy and is therefore considered the first martyr of the modern Italian Republic and a symbol of republican ideals in Italy.

=== Albertine Statute and liberal Italy ===
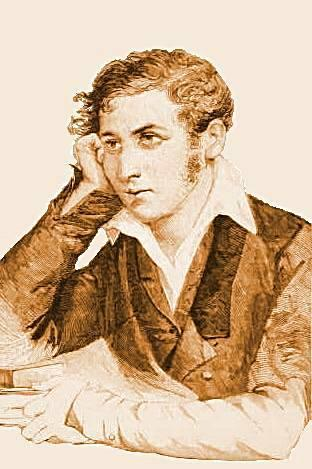
Carlo Cattaneo

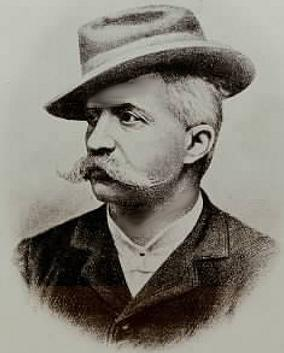
Felice Cavallotti

The balance of power between the Chamber and Senate initially shifted in favor of the Senate, composed mainly of nobles and industrial figures. Little by little, the Chamber of Deputies took on more and more importance with the evolution of the bourgeoisie and the large landowners, concerned with economic progress, but supporters of order and a certain social conservatism.

The Republicans took part in the elections to the Italian Parliament, and in 1853 they formed the Action Party around Giuseppe Mazzini. Although in exile, Mazzini was elected in 1866, but refused to take his seat in parliament. Carlo Cattaneo was elected deputy in 1860 and 1867, but refused so as not to have to swear loyalty to the House of Savoy. The problem of the oath of loyalty to the monarchy, necessary to be elected, was the subject of controversy within the republican forces. In 1873 Felice Cavallotti, one of the most committed Italian politicians against the monarchy, preceded his oath with a declaration in which he reaffirmed his republican beliefs. In 1882, a new electoral law lowered the census limit for voting rights, increasing the number of voters to over two million, equal to 7% of the population. In the same year the Italian Workers' Party was created, which in 1895 became the Italian Socialist Party. In 1895 the intransigent republicans agreed to participate in the political life of the Kingdom, establishing the Italian Republican Party. Two years later, the far left reached its historical maximum level in Parliament with 81 deputies, for the three radical-democratic, socialist components and Republican. With the death of Felice Cavallotti in 1898, the radical left gave up on posing the institutional problem.

In Italian politics, the socialist party progressively divided into two tendencies: a maximalist one, led among others by Arturo Labriola and Enrico Ferri, and supporting the use of strikes; the other, reformist and pro-government, was led by Filippo Turati. A nationalist movement emerged, led in particular by Enrico Corradini, as well as a Catholic social and democratic movement, the National Democratic League, led by Romolo Murri. In 1904, Pope Pius X authorized Catholics to participate individually in political life, but in 1909 he condemned the National Democratic League created by Romolo Murri, who was excommunicated. Finally, a law of 3 June 1912 marked Italy's evolution towards a certain political liberalism by establishing universal male suffrage. In 1914, at the outbreak of World War I, Italy began to be counted among the world's liberal democracies.

=== Fascism and World War II ===
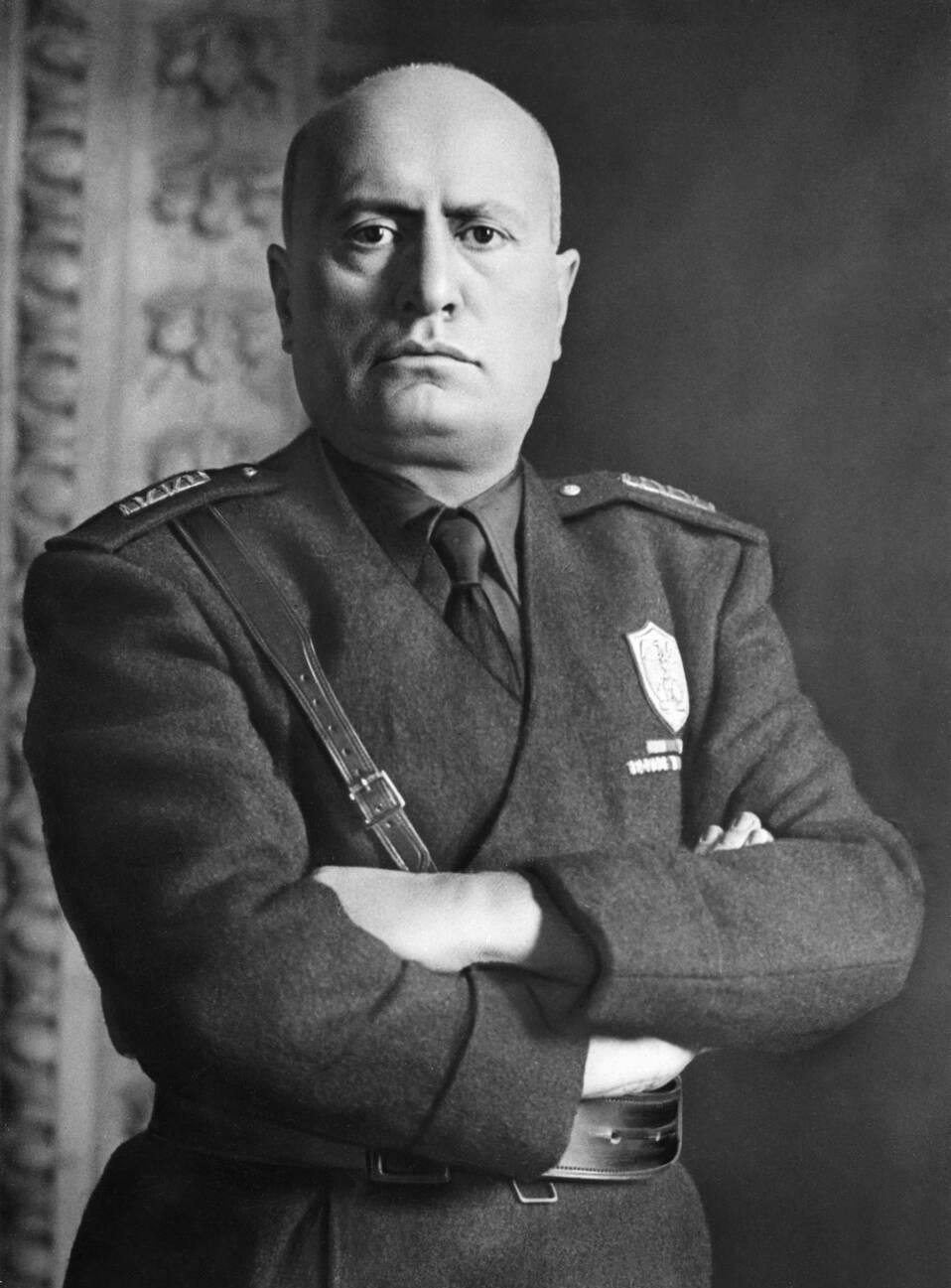
Benito Mussolini titled himself Duce and ruled the country from 1922 to 1943.

After World War I, Italian political life was animated by four great movements. Two of these movements were in favor of democratic development within the framework of existing monarchical institutions: the reformist socialists and the Italian People's Party. Two other movements challenged these institutions: the Republican Party on the one hand, and the maximalist socialists. In the 1919 elections, the parties most imbued with republican ideology (the maximalist socialists and the Republican Party) won, obtaining 165 out of 508 seats in the Chamber of Deputies. In the 1921 elections, after the foundation of the Italian Communist Party, the three parties republican, maximalist socialist and communist obtained 145 deputies out of 535. Overall, at the beginning of the interwar period, less than 30% of those elected were in favor of the establishment of a republican regime. In this context, the rise of Benito Mussolini's fascist movement was based on the bitterness generated by the "mutilated victory", the fear of social unrest and the rejection of revolutionary, republican and Marxist ideology. The liberal political system and part of the aristocracy chose to erect fascism as a bulwark against, in their way of seeing, these dangers.

King Victor Emmanuel III of Italy

In October 1922, the nomination of Benito Mussolini as prime minister by King Victor Emmanuel III, following the march on Rome, paved the way for the establishment of the dictatorship. The Albertine Statute was progressively emptied of its content. Parliament was subject to the will of the new government. (Note: The Chamber of Deputies was replaced in 1939 by Chamber of Fasces and Corporations.) The legal opposition disintegrated. On 27 June 1924, 127 deputies left Parliament and retreated to the Aventine Hill, a clumsy maneuver which, in effect, left the field open to the fascists. They then had the fate of Italy in their hands for two decades.

Flag of Arditi del Popolo, an axe cutting a fasces. Arditi del Popolo was a militant anti-fascist group founded in 1921.

With the implementation of fascist laws (Royal Decree of 6 November 1926), all political parties operating on Italian territory were dissolved, with the exception of the National Fascist Party. Some of these parties expatriated and reconstituted themselves abroad, especially in France. Thus an anti-fascist coalition was formed on 29 March 1927 in Paris, the "Concentrazione Antifascista Italiana", which brought together the Italian Republican Party, the Italian Socialist Party, the Socialist Unitary Party of Italian Workers, the Italian League for Human Rights and the foreign representation of the Italian General Confederation of Labour. Some movements remained outside, including the Italian Communist Party, the popular Catholic movement and other liberal movements. This coalition dissolved on 5 May 1934 and, in August of the same year, the pact of unity of action was signed between the Italian Socialist Party and the Italian Communist Party.

In the meantime, in Italy, clandestine anti-fascist nuclei were formed, in particular in Milan with Ferruccio Parri and in Florence with Riccardo Bauer. Under the impetus of these groups, the Action Party, Mazzini's former republican party, was re-established. (Note: The Action Party, reformed in 1942, constituted in 1944-1945 the second force within the National Liberation Committee. The political party with the largest number of partisan groups is then the Italian Communist Party.) Between the end of 1942 and the beginning of 1943, Alcide De Gasperi wrote The reconstructive ideas of Christian Democracy, which laid the foundations of the new Catholic-inspired party, the Christian Democracy. It brought together the veterans of Luigi Sturzo's Italian People's Party and the young people of Catholic associations, in particular of the University Federation.

Not only did Victor Emmanuel III appeal to Mussolini to form the government in 1922 and allow him to proceed with the domestication of Parliament, but he did not even draw the consequences of the assassination of Giacomo Matteotti in 1924. He accepted the title of emperor in 1936 at the end of Second Italo-Ethiopian War, then the alliance with Nazi Germany and Italy's entry into World War II on 10 June 1940.

Hostilities ended on 29 April 1945, when the German forces in Italy surrendered. Nearly half a million Italians (including civilians) died in World War II, society was divided and the Italian economy had been all but destroyed; per capita income in 1944 was at its lowest point since the beginning of the 20th century.

== Birth of the Republic (1946–1948) ==
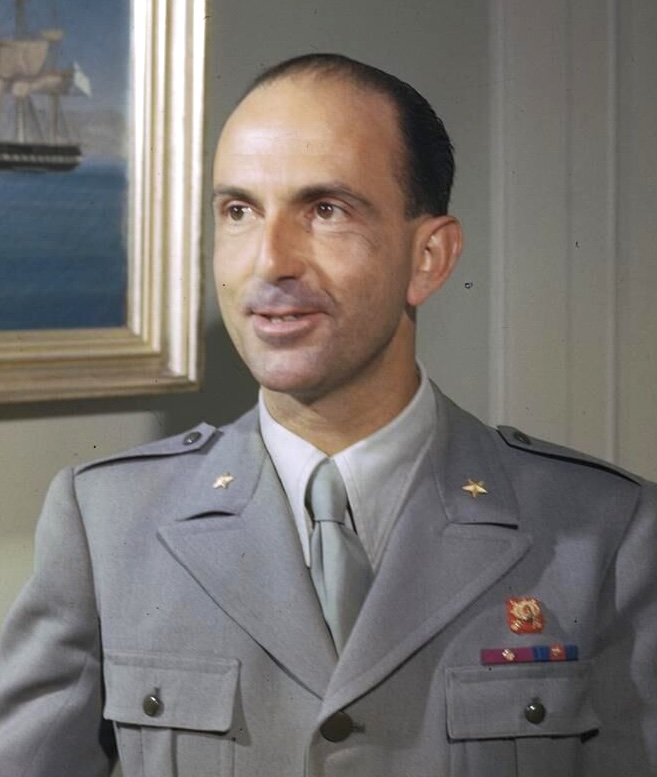
Umberto II, the last King of Italy, was exiled to Portugal.

In the final phases of World War II, King Victor Emmanuel III, tainted by his former support for the Fascist regime, had tried to save the monarchy by nominating his son and heir Umberto "general lieutenant of the kingdom"; the king promised that after the end of the war the Italian people could choose its form of government through a referendum. In April 1945, the Allies of World War II advanced in the Po plain supported by the Italian resistance movement, and defeated the fascist Italian Social Republic, a puppet state instituted by Nazi Germany and headed by Benito Mussolini. Mussolini was killed by resistance fighters in April 1945. Much like Japan and Germany, the aftermath of World War II left Italy with a destroyed economy, a divided society, and anger against the monarchy for its endorsement of the Fascist regime for the previous twenty years. These frustrations contributed to a revival of the Italian republican movement.

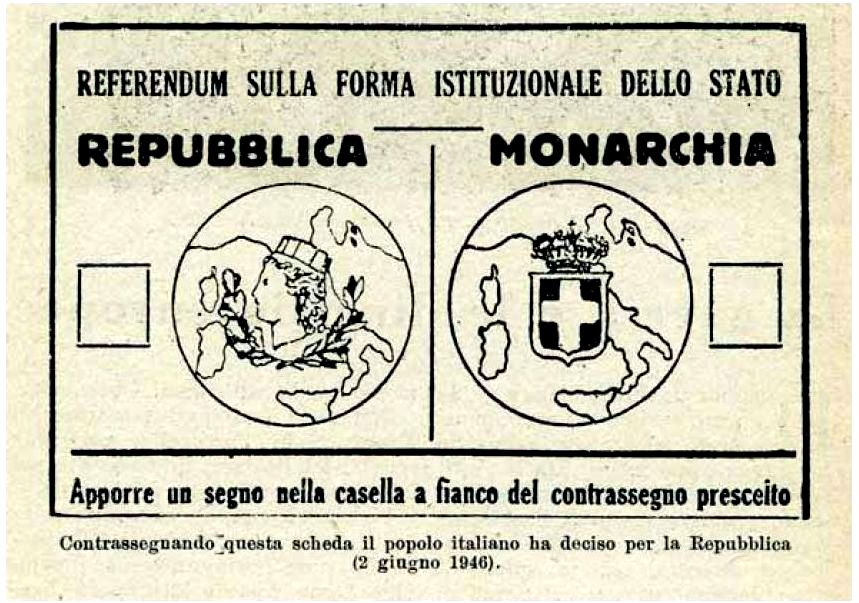
Electoral ballot of the 1946 Italian institutional referendum

Victor Emmanuel formally abdicated on 9 May 1946; his son became king as Umberto II of Italy. The 1946 Italian institutional referendum was held on 2 June. The republican side won 54% of the vote and Italy officially became a republic. The Kingdom of Italy was no more. It was the first time that the whole Italian Peninsula was under a form of republican governance since the end of the ancient Roman Republic. The House of Savoy, the Italian royal family, was exiled. Victor Emmanuel left for Egypt, where he died in 1947. Umberto, who had been king for only a month, moved to Portugal. The referendum at the origin of the Italian republic was, however, the subject of some controversy, not least because of some contested results and because of a geographical divide between the North, where the Republic won a clear majority, and the South, where the monarchists were in a majority.

A Constituent Assembly, formed by the representatives of all the anti-fascist forces that contributed to the defeat of Nazi and Fascist forces during the liberation of Italy, was in place between June 1946 and January 1948; it wrote the new Constitution of Italy, which took effect on 1 January 1948. The peace treaty between Italy and the Allies of World War II was signed in Paris in February 1947. In 1946, the main Italian political parties were:

- Christian Democracy (DC)
- Italian Socialist Party (PSI)
- Italian Communist Party (PCI)

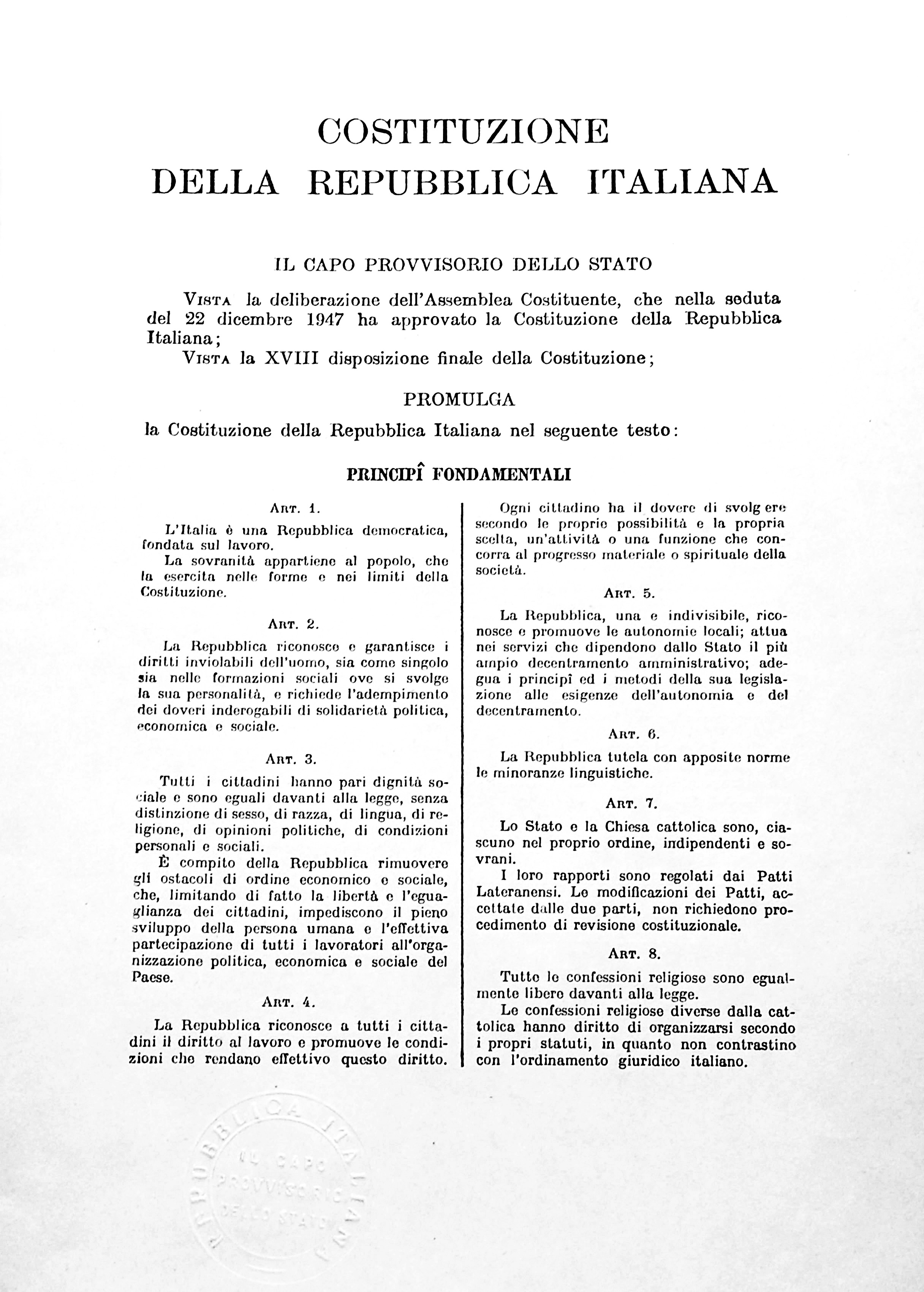
One of three original copies of the Constitution of Italy, now in the custody of Historical Archives of the president of the Republic

Each party had run separate candidates in the 1946 general election, and the Christian Democrats won a plurality of votes. The PSI and the PCI received some ministerial posts in a Christian Democrat–led coalition cabinet. PCI's leader Palmiro Togliatti was minister of Justice. As in France, where Maurice Thorez and four other Communist ministers were forced to leave Paul Ramadier's government during the May 1947 crisis, both the Italian Communists (PCI) and Socialists (PSI) were excluded from government the same month under pressure from US President Harry Truman.

Since the PSI and the PCI together received more votes than the Christian Democrats, they decided to unite in 1948 to form the Popular Democratic Front (FDP). The 1948 general elections were heavily influenced by the then flaring cold-war confrontation between the Soviet Union and the US. After the Soviet-inspired February 1948 communist coup in Czechoslovakia the US became alarmed about Soviet intentions and feared that the Soviet-funded PCI would draw Italy into the Soviet Union's sphere of influence if the leftist coalition were to win the elections. In response, in March 1948 the United States National Security Council issued its first document proffering recommendations to avoid such an outcome which were widely and energetically implemented. Tons of letters were sent by mostly Italian Americans urging Italians not to vote Communist. US agencies made numerous short-wave propaganda radio broadcasts and funded the publishing of books and articles, warning the Italians of the perceived consequences of a Communist victory. The CIA also funded the centre-right political parties and was accused of publishing forged letters to discredit the leaders of the PCI. The PCI itself was accused of being funded by Moscow and the Cominform, and in particular via export deals to the communist countries.

Fears in the Italian electorate of a possible Communist takeover proved crucial for the electoral outcome on 18 April; the Christian Democrats (Democrazia Cristiana, DC), under the undisputed leadership of Alcide De Gasperi won a resounding victory with 48% of the vote, which was their best result ever and not repeated since, while the FDP only received 31% of the votes. The Communist Party widely outdid the Socialists in the distribution of seats in Parliament, and gained a solid position as the main opposition party in Italy, even if it would never return in government. For almost four decades, Italian elections were successively won by the DC, a centrist party.

== The symbolic photo of the birth of the Republic ==
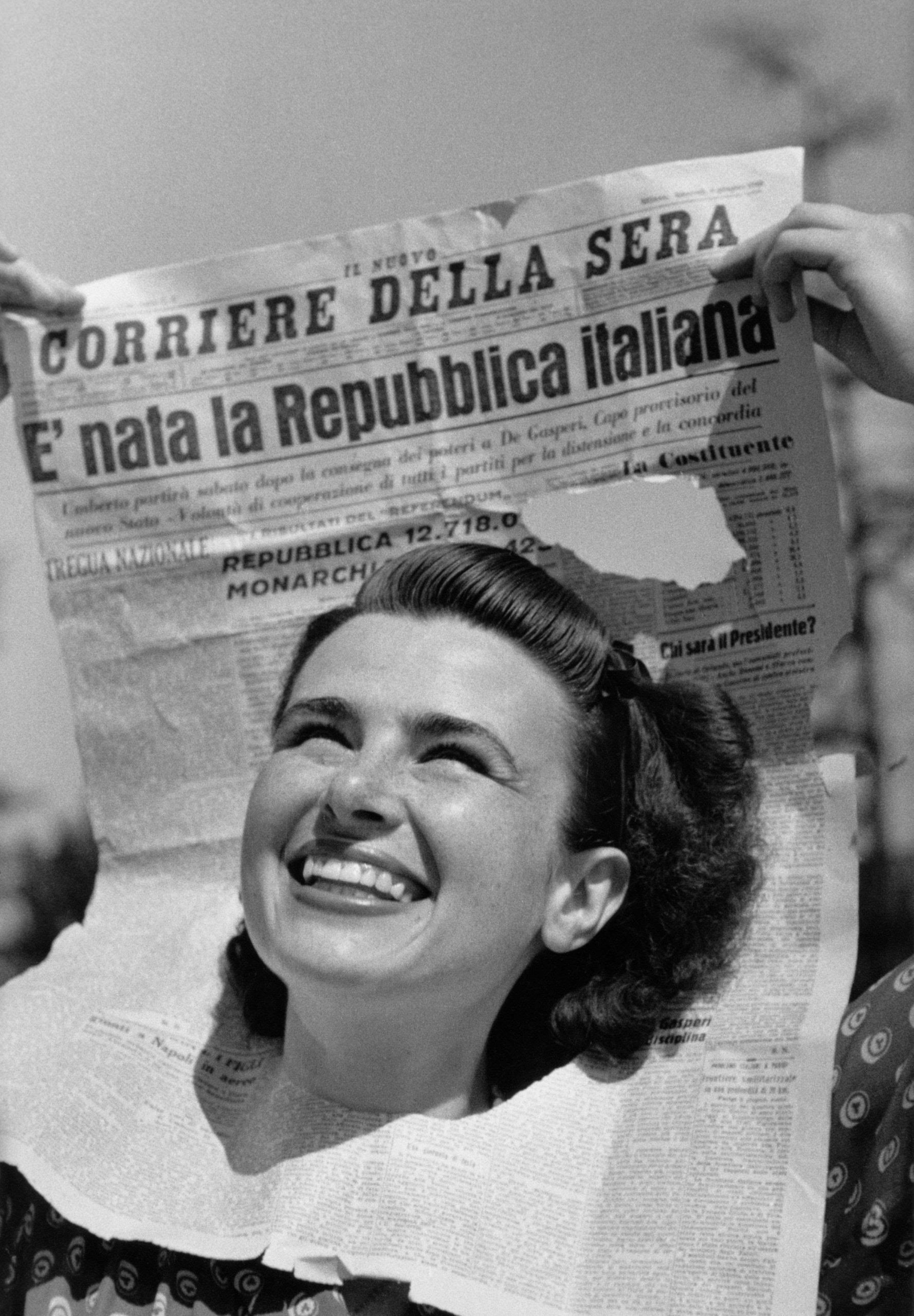
The symbolic photo of the birth of the Republic, which portrays the face of a young woman emerging from a copy of Il Corriere della Sera of 6 June 1946 with the title «È nata la Repubblica Italiana» ("The Italian Republic is born")

The photo, which later became a "symbol" of the celebrations for the outcome of the referendum, portrays the face of a young woman emerging from a copy of Il Corriere della Sera of 6 June 1946 with the title «È nata la Repubblica Italiana» ("The Italian Republic is born").

The symbolic photo of the birth of the Republic was taken by Federico Patellani for the weekly Tempo (n. 22, 15–22 June 1946) as part of a photo shoot celebrating the Republic and the new role of women; it was also featured on the front page of the Il Corriere della Sera itself and was later reused in many campaigns and posters.

Only in 2016 was the woman identified as Anna Iberti (1922–1997).

== First Republic (1948–1994) ==
=== 1950s and 1960s: post-war economic boom ===
Under the Treaty of Peace with Italy, 1947, Istria, Kvarner, most of the Julian March as well as the Dalmatian city of Zara was annexed by Yugoslavia causing the Istrian-Dalmatian exodus, which led to the emigration of between 230,000 and 350,000 of local ethnic Italians (Istrian Italians and Dalmatian Italians), the others being ethnic Slovenians, ethnic Croatians, and ethnic Istro-Romanians, choosing to maintain Italian citizenship. Later, the Free Territory of Trieste was divided between the two states. Italy also lost all of its colonial possessions, formally ending the Italian Empire. In 1950, Italian Somaliland was made a United Nations Trust Territory under Italian administration until 1 July 1960. The Italian border that applies today has existed since 1975, when Trieste was formally re-annexed to Italy.

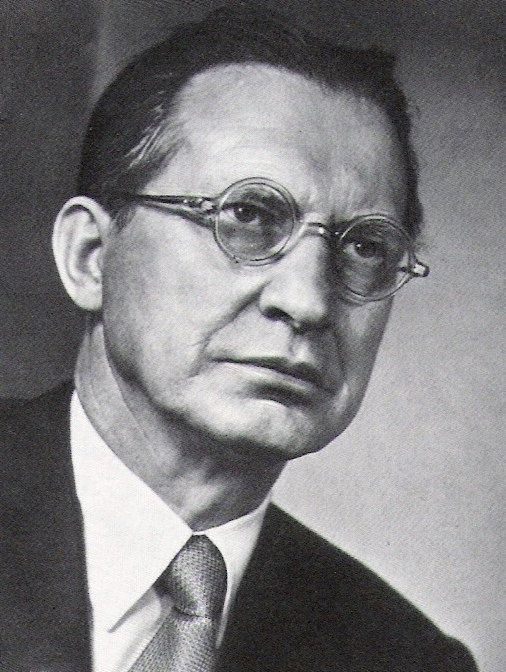
Alcide De Gasperi, the first republican Prime Minister of Italy and one of the Founding Fathers of the European Union. He was Prime Minister from 1945 to 1953.

In the 1950s Italy became a founding member of the NATO alliance (1949), a member of the United Nations (1955) and an ally of the United States, which helped to revive the Italian economy through the Marshall Plan. In the same years, Italy also became a founding member of the ECSC (1952) and of the European Economic Community (1957), later developed into the European Union. At the end of the 1950s, an impressive economic growth was termed "Italian economic miracle", a term that is still recognized in Italian politics. The impact of the economic miracle on Italian society was huge. Fast economic expansion induced massive inflows of migrants from rural Southern Italy to the industrial cities of the North. Emigration was especially directed to the factories of the "industrial triangle", the name for the region placed between the major manufacturing centres of Milan and Turin and the seaport of Genoa. Between 1955 and 1971, around 9 million people are estimated to have been involved in inter-regional migrations in Italy, uprooting entire communities and creating large metropolitan areas. At the same time, the doubling of Italian GDP, which occurred between 1950 and 1962 Italians families used their newfound wealth to purchase consumer durables for the first time. In 1955, only 3% of households owned refrigerators and 1% washing machines; by 1975, the respective figures were 94% and 76%. In addition, 66% of all homes had come to possess cars. As noted by the historian Paul Ginsborg:

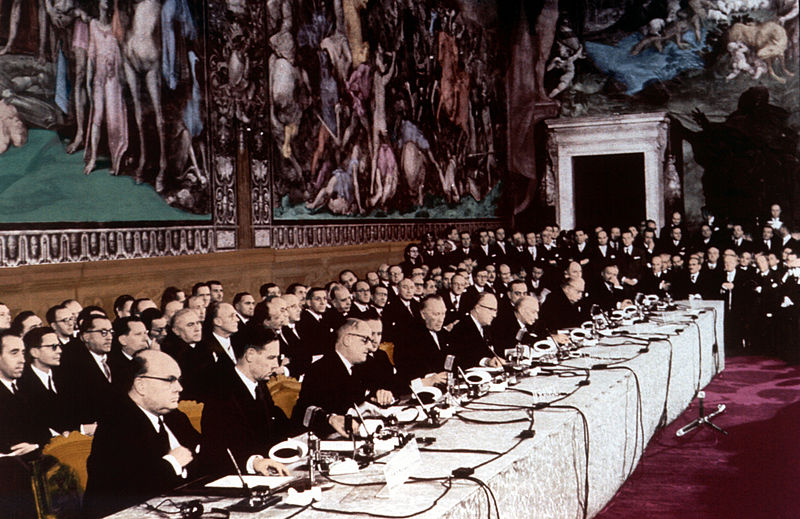
The signing ceremony of the Treaty of Rome on 25 March 1957, creating the European Economic Community, forerunner of the present-day European Union

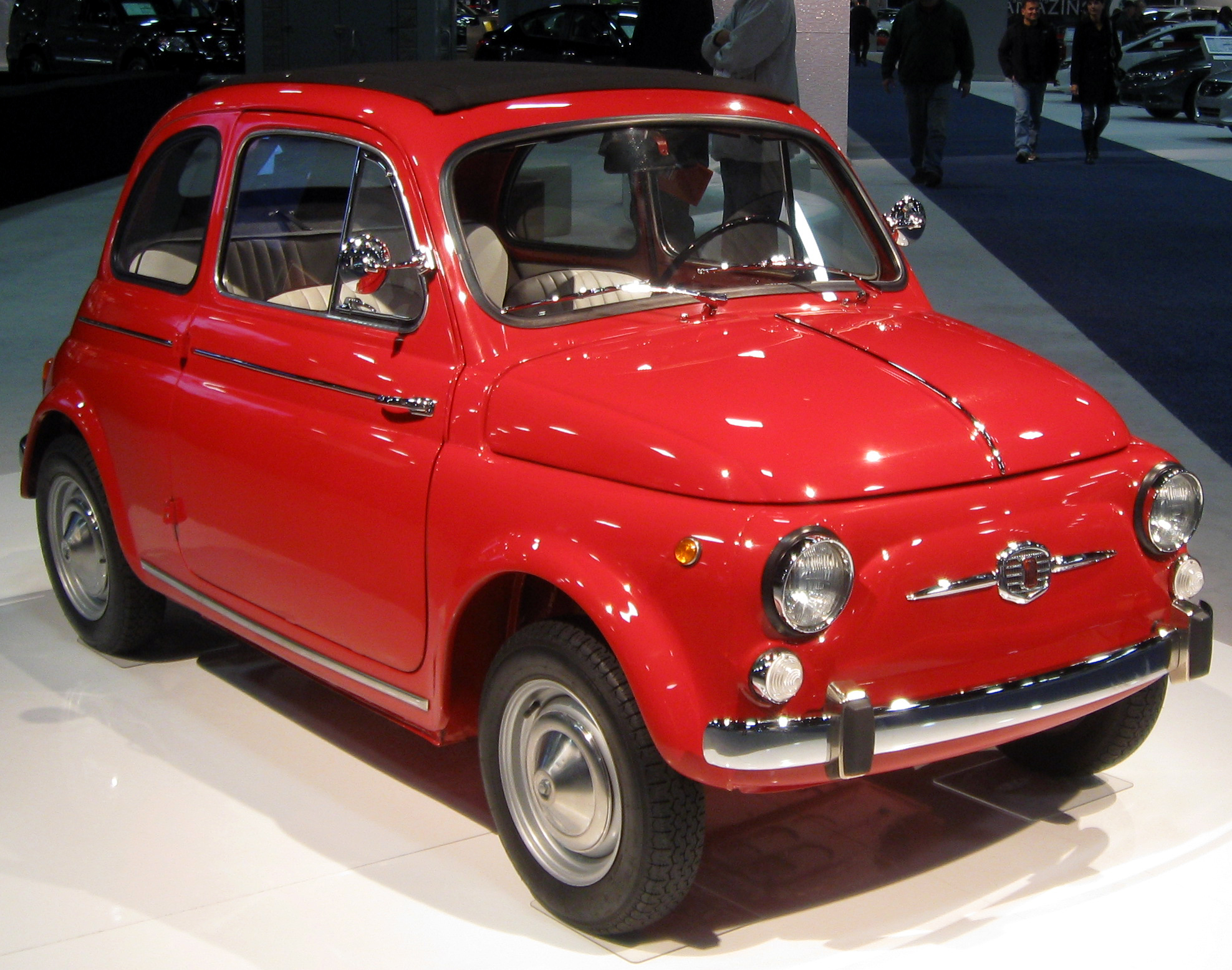
The Fiat 500, launched in 1957, is considered a symbol of Italy's economic miracle.

In the twenty years from 1950 to 1970 per capita income in Italy grew more rapidly than in any other European country: from a base of 100 in 1950 to 234.1 in 1970, compared to France's increase from 100 to 136 in the same period, and Britain's 100 to 132. By 1970 Italian per capita income, which in 1945 had lagged far behind that of the northern European countries, had reached 60 per cent of that in France and 82 per cent of that in Britain.

A gaping north–south divide was a major factor of socio-economic weakness, a problem that still exists today, and even now there is a huge difference in official income between northern and southern regions and municipalities. Christian Democracy's main support areas (sometimes known as "vote tanks") were the rural areas in South, Center and North-East Italy, whereas the industrial North-West had more left-leaning support because of the larger working class. An interesting exception were the "red regions" (Emilia-Romagna, Tuscany, Umbria) where the Italian Communist Party has historically had a wide support. This is considered a consequence of the particular sharecropping ("mezzadria") farming contracts used in these regions.

The Holy See actively supported the Christian Democracy, judging it would be a mortal sin for a Catholic to vote for the Communist Party and excommunicating all its supporters. Giovannino Guareschi wrote his novels about Don Camillo describing a village, Brescello, whose inhabitants are at the same time loyal to priest Camillo and Communist mayor Peppone, who are fierce rivals.

In 1953, a Parliamentary Commission on poverty estimated that 24% of Italian families were either "destitute" or "in hardship", 21% of dwellings were overcrowded, 52% of homes in the south had no running drinking water, and only 57% had a lavatory. In the 1950s, several important reforms were launched: e.g., agrarian reform (legge Scelba), fiscal reform (legge Vanoni), and the country enjoyed a period of extraordinary economic development (Italian: miracolo economico, lit. 'economic miracle'). In this period of time, a massive population transfer, from the impoverished South to the booming industrial North, took place. This however exacerbated social contrasts, including between the old-established "worker aristocracy" and the new less qualified immigrants ("operaio-massa") of Southern origin. In addition, a wide gap between rich and poor continued to exist. By the end of the Sixties, it was estimated that 4 million Italians (out of a population of 54.5 million) were unemployed, underemployed, and casual labourers. As noted by the historian Paul Ginsborg, the affluent society to this section of the Italian population "might have meant a television set but precious little else".

During the First Republic, the Christian Democracy slowly but steadily lost support, as society modernised and the traditional values at its ideological core became less appealing to the population. Various options of extending the parliamentary majority were considered, mainly an opening to the left (apertura a sinistra), i.e., to the Socialist Party (PSI), which after the 1956 events in Hungary had moved from a position of total subordination to the Communists to an independent position. Proponents of such a coalition proposed a series much-needed "structural reforms" that would modernize the country and create a modern social-democracy. In 1960, an attempt by the right wing of the Christian Democrats to incorporate the neo-fascist Italian Social Movement (MSI) in the Tambroni government led to violent and bloody riots (Genoa, Reggio Emilia), and was defeated.

Up until the Nineties, two types of governmental coalitions characterised the politics of post-war Italy. The first were "centrist" coalitions led by the Christian Democracy party together with smaller parties: the PSDI, the PRT, and the PLI. The first democratic government (1947) excluded both the PCI and the PSI, which brought about the political period known as "centrist government", which ruled over Italian politics from 1948 to 1963. The centre-left coalition (DC-PRI-PSDI-PSI) was the second type of coalition that characterised Italian politics, coming about in 1963 when the PSI (formerly the opposition party) went into government with the DC. This coalition lasted in parliament throughout the Sixties and Seventies and then experienced a revival in the Eighties that lasted until the start of the Nineties.

Aldo Moro, Prime Minister from 1963 to 1968 and from 1974 to 1976

The PSI entered government in 1963. During the first year of the new Centre-Left Government, a wide range of measures were carried out which went some way towards the Socialist Party's requirements for governing in coalition with the Christian Democrats. These included taxation of real estate profits and of share dividends (designed to curb speculation), increases in pensions for various categories of workers, a law on school organisation (to provide for a unified secondary school with compulsory attendance up to the age of 14), the nationalisation of the electric-power industry, and significant wage rises for workers (including those in the newly nationalised electric-power industry), which led to a rise in consumer demand. Urged on by the PSI, the government also made brave attempts to tackle issues relating to welfare services, hospitals, the agrarian structure, urban development, education, and overall planning. For instance, during the Centre-Left Government's time in office, social security was extended to previously uncovered categories of the population. In addition, entrance to university by examination was abolished in 1965. Despite these important reforms, however, the reformist drive was soon lost, and the most important problems (including the mafia, social inequalities, inefficient state/social services, north–south imbalance) remained largely untackled.

The Italian Parliament voted, in December 1962, a law which created an Antimafia Commission. Any question about the need for such a law was obviated by the Ciaculli massacre in June of the following year, in which seven policemen and soldiers were killed attempting to defuse a car bomb in the suburbs of Palermo. The existence of the bomb had been disclosed by an anonymous telephone call. The massacre took place in the frame of the First Mafia War in the 1960s, with the bomb intended for Salvatore Greco, head of the Sicilian Mafia Commission formed in the late 1950s. The Mafia was fighting for the control of the profitable opportunities brought about by rapid urban growth and the heroin trade to North America. The ferocity of the struggle was unprecedented, reaping 68 victims from 1961 to 1963. The Antimafia Commission submitted its final report in 1976. The Mafia had created ties with the political world. The period 1958–1964, when Salvo Lima (DC) was mayor of Palermo and Vito Ciancimino (DC) was assessor for public works, was later referred to as the "Sack of Palermo".

In 1965, the SIFAR intelligence agency was transformed into the SID following an aborted coup d'état, Piano Solo, which was to give the power to the Carabinieri, then headed by General De Lorenzo.

The difficult equilibrium of Italian society was challenged by a rising left-wing movement, in the wake of 1968 student unrest (Sessantotto). This movement was characterized by such heterogeneous events as revolts by jobless farm workers (Avola, Battipaglia 1969), occupations of universities by students, social unrest in the large Northern factories (1969 hot autumn, autunno caldo). While conservative forces tried to roll back some of the social advances of the 1960s, and part of the military indulged in "sabre rattling" to intimidate progressive political forces, numerous left-wing activists became increasingly frustrated at social inequalities, while the myth of guerrilla (Che Guevara, the Uruguayan Tupamaros) and of the Chinese Maoist "cultural revolution" increasingly inspired extreme left-wing violent movements.

Social protests, in which the student movement was particularly active, shook Italy during the 1969 Hot Autumn (autunno caldo), leading to the occupation of the Fiat factory in Turin. In March 1968, clashes occurred at La Sapienza university in Rome, during the "Battle of Valle Giulia". Mario Capanna, associated with the New Left, was one of the figures of the student movement, along with the members of Potere Operaio and Autonomia Operaia such as Antonio Negri, Oreste Scalzone, Franco Piperno and of Lotta Continua such as Adriano Sofri.

=== 1970s: strategy of tension and Years of Lead ===
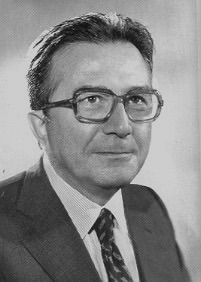
Giulio Andreotti, Prime Minister from 1972 to 1973, from 1976 to 1979 and from 1989 to 1992

The period of the late 1960–1970s came to be known as the Opposti Estremismi, (from left-wing and right-wing extremists riots), later renamed Years of Lead (anni di piombo) because of a wave of bombings and shootings – the first victim of this period was Antonio Annarumma, a policeman, killed on 12 November 1969 in Milan during a left-wing demonstration.

In December, four bombings struck in Rome the Monument of Vittorio Emanuele II (Altare della Patria), the Banca Nazionale del Lavoro, and in Milan the Banca Commerciale and the Banca Nazionale dell'Agricoltura. The later bombing, known as the Piazza Fontana bombing of 12 December 1969, killed 16 and injured 90. The bombing was the work of the right-wing group Ordine Nuovo ("New Order"), whose aim was to prevent the country from falling into the hands of the left wing by duping the public into believing the bombings were part of a communist insurgency.

On 17 May 1972, police officer Luigi Calabresi, who was subsequently awarded a gold medal of the Italian Republic for civil valour, was assassinated in Milan. Sixteen years later, Adriano Sofri, Giorgio Pietrostefani and Ovidio Bompressi and Leonardo Marino were arrested in Milan, accused by the confession of Leonardo Marino, one of the participants in the assassination. Highly controversial, the trial concluded, after an alternance of convictions and acquittals, to their guilt.

During a ceremony in honour of Luigi Calabresi on 17 May 1973, where the Interior Minister Mariano Rumor was present, an anarchist, Gianfranco Bertoli, threw a bomb killing four and injuring 45.

Count Edgardo Sogno revealed in his memoirs that in July 1974, he visited the CIA station chief in Rome to inform him of the preparation of a neo-fascist coup. Asking him what the US government would do in case of such an operation, Sogno wrote that the CIA officer responsible for Italy answered him that "the United States would have supported any initiative tending to keep the communists out of government." General Maletti declared, in 2001, that he had not known about Sogno's relations to the CIA and had not been informed of the right-wing coup, known as Golpe Bianco (White Coup), and prepared with Randolfo Pacciardi.

General Vito Miceli, chief of the SIOS military intelligence agency from 1969 on, and head of the SID from 1970 to 1974, was arrested in 1974 on charges of "conspiracy against the state". Following his arrest, the Italian secret services were reorganized with a 24 October 1977 law in a democratic attempt to regain civilian and parliamentary control of them. The SID was divided into the current SISMI, the SISDE and the CESIS, which had a coordination role and was directly led by the president of the Council. Furthermore, a Parliamentary Committee on Secret services control (Copaco) was created at the same occasion. 1978 was the year with the most terrorist actions.

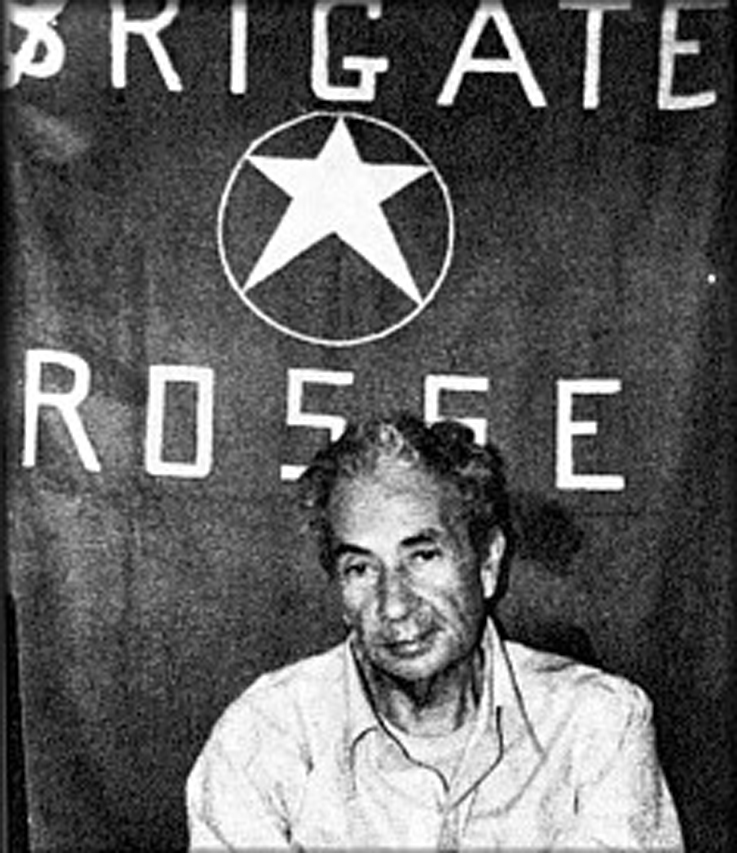
Aldo Moro, photographed during his kidnapping by the Red Brigades

Christian Democrat Aldo Moro was assassinated in May 1978 by the Red Brigades, a terrorist leftist group then led by Mario Moretti. Before his murder, Aldo Moro, a central figure in the Christian Democrat Party, several times prime minister, was trying to include the Communist Party, headed by Enrico Berlinguer, in the parliamentary majority, an operation called the Historic Compromise. At this point, the PCI was the largest communist party in western Europe; this was largely due to its reformist orientation, to its growing independence from Moscow and to the new Eurocommunism doctrine.

In the period of terror attacks of the late 1970s and early 1980s, the parliamentary majority was composed by the parties of the arco costituzionale, i.e., all parties supporting the Constitution, including the Communists, who took a very strong stance against the Red Brigades and other terrorist groups; however, the Communists never took part in the government itself, which was composed by the "Pentapartito" (Christian Democrats, Socialists, Social Democrats, Liberals, and Republicans).

Although the 1970s in Italy was marked by violence, it was also a time of great social and economic progress. Following the civil disturbances of the 1960s, Christian Democracy and its allies in government (including the PSI) introduced a wide range of political, social, and economic reforms. Regional governments were introduced in the spring of 1970, with elected councils provided with the authority to legislate in areas like public works, town planning, social welfare, and health. Spending on the relatively poor South was significantly increased, while new laws relating to index-linked pay, public housing, and pension provision were also passed. In 1975, a law was passed entitling redundant workers to receive at least 80% of their previous salary for up to a year from a state insurance fund. Living standards also continued to rise, with wages going up by an average of about 25% a year from the early 1970s onwards, and between 1969 and 1978, average real wages rose by 72%. Various fringe benefits were raised to the extent that they amounted to an additional 50% to 60% on wages, the highest in any country in the Western world. In addition, working hours were reduced so that by the end of the decade they were lower than any other country apart from Belgium. Some categories of workers who were laid off received generous unemployment compensation which represented only a little less than full wages, often years beyond eligibility. Initially, these benefits were primarily enjoyed by industrial workers in northern Italy where the "Hot Autumn" had its greatest impact, but these benefits soon spread to other categories of workers in other areas. In 1975, the escalator clause was strengthened in wage contracts, providing a high proportion of workers with nearly 100% indexation, with quarterly revisions, thereby increasing wages nearly as fast as prices.

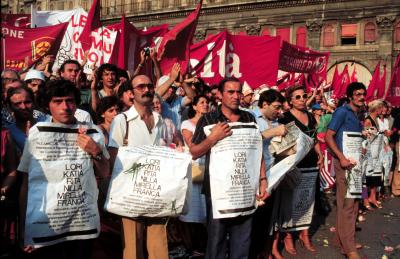
Funerals of the victims of the Bologna bombing of 2 August 1980, the deadliest attack ever perpetrated in Italy during the Years of Lead

A statute of worker's rights that was drafted and pushed into enactment in 1970 by the Socialist labour minister Giacomo Brodolini, greatly strengthened the authority of the trade unions in the factories, outlawed dismissal without just cause, guaranteed freedom of assembly and speech on the shop floor, forbade employers to keep records of the union or political affiliations of their workers, and prohibited hiring except through the state employment office.

From 1957, Italian workers had partly been sheltered from the falling value of money by what was termed a "moving staircase", which automatically raised wages as prices increased. In 1975, this provision was extended so that all workers received a flat fee that automatically compensated them for as much as 75% of the previous three months' price increases. This meant in practice that money wages rose faster than the cost of living, because better-paid groups fought for extra sums to maintain their differentials, and also because various industries negotiated local and national wage deals in addition to the increments that all workers received. By 1985, the average Italian was twice as rich in real terms as he was in 1960.

By the mid-1970s, Italy had the most generous welfare provisions in Europe, while average Italian workers were among the best paid, most protected, and best treated on the continent. The prosperity that most Italians came to enjoy was reflected in the possession by households of a variety of consumer goods. In 1977, for example, 73.1% of households had a car, 83% a washing machine, 28% a vacuum cleaner, 42% a food processor, 85% a television, 22% a cassette recorder, 45% a still camera and 92% a transistor radio, while in 1976 4% of households had a radio recorder, 28% a tape recorder, and 42% a record player.

Because of reforms carried out in the Seventies, Italian families in the Eighties had access to a far wider range of state services than before, such as recreational and sports facilities, subsidies for medicines, proper medical care, and kindergarten schools. In addition, the growth in the income of most Italian families during the Seventies and Eighties was so significant that Giuseppe De Rita wrote of this period as a "watershed in the history of the Italian family".

Despite these achievements, socio-economic inequalities continued to pervade Italy by the early Eighties. In 1983, it was estimated that over 18% of the population of the South lived below the official poverty line, compared with 6.9% of the population of the North and Centre.

=== 1980s: economic recession and reforms under Bettino Craxi ===
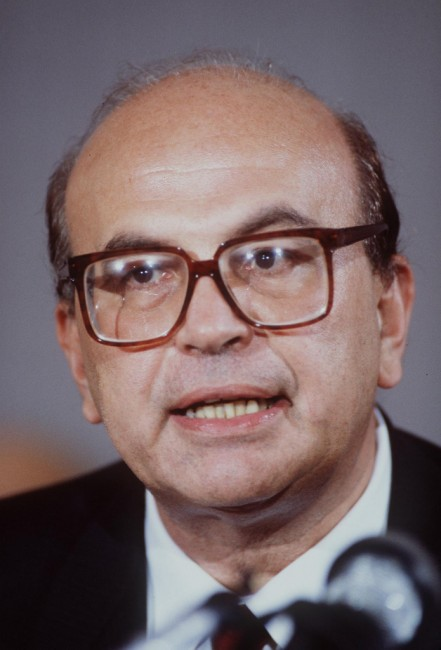
Bettino Craxi, first Socialist Prime Minister from 1983 to 1987

The economic recession went on into the mid-1980s until a set of reforms led to the independence of the Bank of Italy and a big reduction of the indexation of wages that strongly reduced inflation rates, from 20.6% in 1980 to 4.7% in 1987. The new macroeconomic and political stability resulted in a second, export-led "economic miracle", based on small and medium-sized enterprises, producing clothing, leather products, shoes, furniture, textiles, jewelry, and machine tools. As a result of this rapid expansion, in 1987 Italy overtook the UK's economy (an event known as il sorpasso), becoming the fourth richest nation in the world, after the US, Japan and West Germany. The Milan stock exchange increased its market capitalization more than fivefold in the space of a few years.

Meanwhile, the PSI, which was at an all-time low, squeezed in the pincer of the historic compromise attempt between the two major parties, called on the new secretary Bettino Craxi to revive his fortunes, whose political rise represented a factor of innovation in the system of First Republic, now unable to give adequate responses to the changes taking place in Italian society.

In the 1980s, for the first time since 1945, two governments were led by non-Christian Democrat Premiers: Republican Giovanni Spadolini and Socialist Bettino Craxi. The DC remained, however, the main force supporting the government.

With the end of the Years of Lead, the PCI gradually increased their votes under the leadership of Enrico Berlinguer. The Socialist Party (PSI), led by Bettino Craxi, became more and more critical of the Communists and of the Soviet Union; Craxi himself pushed in favour of US President Ronald Reagan's positioning of Pershing II missiles in Italy, a move the Communists hotly contested.

As the Socialist Party moved to more moderate positions, the ranks of the PCI increased in numbers, and the Communist Party surpassed the Christian Democracy (DC) in the European election of 1984, barely two days after Berlinguer's death, that likely drew sympathy in the population. Huge crowds attended Berlinguer's funeral. That was to be the only time the Christian Democracy was not the largest party in a nationwide election they participated in. In 1984, the Craxi government revised the 1929 Lateran Pacts with the Vatican, which concluded the role of Catholicism as Italy's state religion.

With the Mani Pulite investigation, starting just one year after the collapse of the Soviet Union, the discovery of the extent of corruption, which involved most of Italy's important political parties, apart from the PCI, led the whole power structure to falter. The scandal became known as Tangentopoli, and seemingly indestructible parties like the DC and the PSI disbanded. The Communist Party, although it had not been much worried by legal investigations, changed its name to Democratic Party of the Left. Observing the fall of the Soviet Union, it took the role of being essentially just one more democratic party in Italy. What was to follow was then called the transition to the Second Republic.

Economic prosperity rose during the 1980s, with rises in the ownership of goods such as color televisions, cars, washing machines, telephones and refrigerators. Home ownership reached over 66% of Italian families, while over 5 million also had holiday homes as well. Homelessness was also rare. In addition, per capita income rose to $15,120 by 1989; higher than that of Britain's (which stood at $14,610) but lower than that of the United States ($20,630).

=== 1990s: Tangentopoli corruption scandal and mani pulite inquiry ===
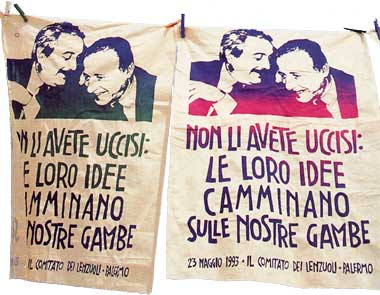
Sheets with the iconic picture of Giovanni Falcone and Paolo Borsellino, exposed as a sign of protest against Italian Mafia. They read: "You did not kill them: their ideas walk on our legs".

Italy faced several terror attacks between 1992 and 1993 perpetrated by the Sicilian Mafia as a consequence of several life sentences pronounced during the "Maxi Trial", and of the new anti-mafia measures launched by the government. In 1992, two major dynamite attacks killed the judges Giovanni Falcone (23 May in the Capaci bombing) and Paolo Borsellino (19 July in the Via D'Amelio bombing). One year later (May–July 1993), tourist spots were attacked, such as the Via dei Georgofili in Florence, Via Palestro in Milan, and the Piazza San Giovanni in Laterano and Via San Teodoro in Rome, leaving 10 dead and 93 injured and causing severe damage to cultural heritage such as the Uffizi Gallery. The Catholic Church openly condemned the Mafia, and two churches were bombed and an anti-Mafia priest shot dead in Rome.

From 1992 to 1997, Italy faced significant challenges as voters (disenchanted with past political paralysis, massive government debt, extensive corruption, and organized crime's considerable influence collectively called Tangentopoli after being uncovered by Mani pulite – "Clean hands") demanded political, economic, and ethical reforms. The scandals involved all major parties, but especially those in the government coalition: between 1992 and 1994 the DC underwent a severe crisis and was dissolved, splitting up into several pieces, among which were the Italian People's Party and the Christian Democratic Center. The PSI (and the other governing minor parties) completely dissolved. This "revolution" of the Italian political landscape, happened at a time when some institutional reforms (notably changes in the electoral laws intended to diminish the power of political parties) were taking place.

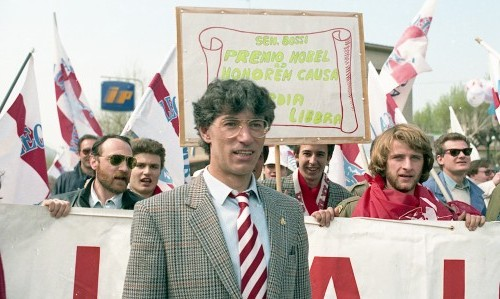
Umberto Bossi at the first Lega Nord rally in Pontida, 1990

In the Italian referendums of 1993, voters approved substantial changes, including moving from a proportional to partially compensatory mixed member majoritarian (not mixed-member proportional representation) system (with the requirement to obtain a minimum of 4% of the national vote to obtain representation) which is largely dominated by a majoritarian electoral system and the abolishment of some ministries (some of which have however been reintroduced with only partly modified names, as the Ministry of Agriculture being renamed the Ministry of Agricultural Resources).

Major political parties, beset by scandal and loss of voter confidence, underwent far-reaching changes. The main changes in the political landscape were:

- The left-wing vote appeared to be close to winning a majority. As of late 1993, it appeared that a coalition of left-wing parties may have won 40% of the vote, which would have sufficed to obtain a majority with the new electoral system given the disarray of other factions;
- The neo-fascist Italian Social Movement changed name and symbol into National Alliance, a party that its president Gianfranco Fini called "post-fascist". Some new members entered into the newly formed party, such as Publio Fiori from the Christian Democracy, but not to a large extent.
- The Northern League movement vastly increased its support, with some polls indicating up to 16% on a national basis, remarkable when considering that it was only presenting itself in one-third of the country. Secretary Umberto Bossi was gathering protest votes and the support of northern people.
- In the meantime, Silvio Berlusconi, previously very close to Bettino Craxi and even having appeared in commercials for the Italian Socialist Party, was studying the possibility of making a political party of his own to avoid what seemed to be the unavoidable victory of the political left at the next elections. Only three months before the election, he presented, with a televised announcement, his new party, Forza Italia. Supporters believe he wanted to avert a Communist victory; opponents that he was defending the ancien régime by rebranding it. Whatever his motives, he employed his power in communication (he owned all of the three main private TV stations in Italy) and advanced communication techniques he and his allies knew very well, as his fortune was largely based on advertising.

Berlusconi managed to ally himself to both the National Alliance and the Northern League, without these being allied with each other. Forza Italia teamed up with the League in the North, where they competed against National Alliance, and with National Alliance in the rest of Italy, where the League was not present. This unusual coalition configuration was caused by the deep hate between the League, which had many supporters who wanted to separate from the rest of Italy and held Rome in deep contempt, and the nationalist post-fascists; on one occasion, Bossi encouraged his supporters to go find National Alliance supporters "house by house," seemingly suggesting a lynching (which however did not actually take place).

The left-wing parties formed a coalition, the Progressisti, which however did not have as clear a leader as Berlusconi. Achille Occhetto, secretary of the Democratic Party of the Left, was however considered to be its main figure.

The remains of the Christian Democracy formed a third, centrist coalition, proposing reformist Mario Segni as their prime minister candidate. The Christian Democracy reverted to the old name "Popular Party," first used at the beginning of the 20th century, and was led by Mino Martinazzoli.

The election saw a major turnover in the new parliament, with 452 out of 630 deputies and 213 out of 315 senators elected for the first time.

== Second Republic (1994–present) ==
The 1994 elections marks the beginning of the Second Republic. They were the first elections to use the new Mattarellum majoritarian voting system, adopted in 1993 to replace the proportional representation system that had been in use since 1946. The transition from the first to the second Republic represented a change within the political system, rather than an overhaul of the constitution, as happened in France, as the republican constitution and most of the institutions but the voting system remained the same in force since 1948. The term is commonly used, at a journalistic but also a scientific level, to emphasize the comparison of the Italian institutional political structure before and after the period 1992–1994, but also its reflection on important economic aspects.

=== Silvio Berlusconi's first government (1994–1995) ===
The 1994 elections also swept media magnate Silvio Berlusconi (leader of the Pole of Freedoms coalition, which included Forza Italia, the regionalist far-right Lega Nord party and the far-right National Alliance), into office as prime minister; however, Berlusconi was forced to step down in December 1994 when Lega Nord withdrew support because they disagreed on the pension reform. The Berlusconi government was succeeded by a technical government headed by Lamberto Dini, who left office in early 1996.

=== Centre-left governments (1996–2001) ===
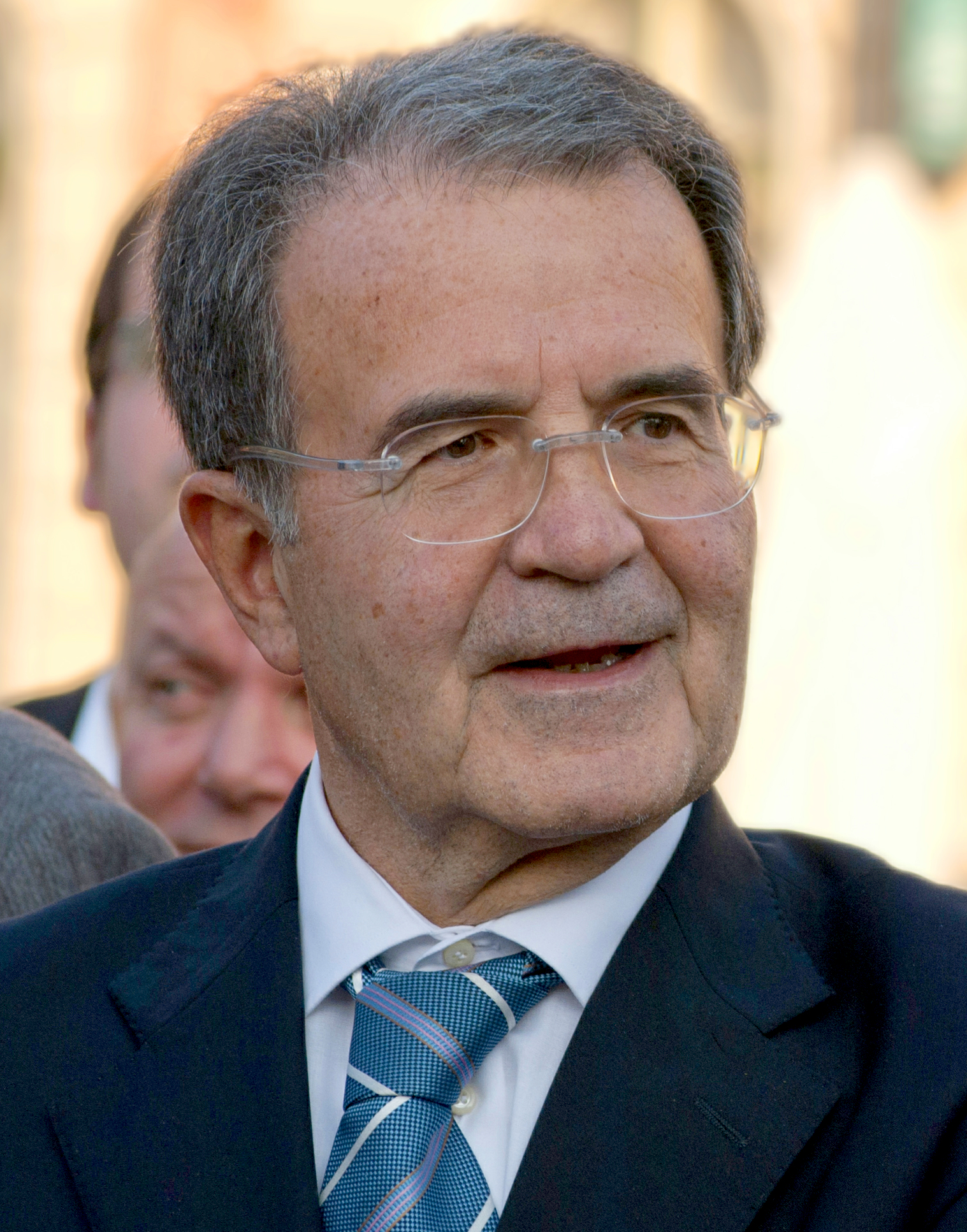
Romano Prodi, Prime Minister from 1996 to 1998 and from 2006 to 2008

A series of centre-left coalitions dominated Italy's political landscape between 1996 and 2001, which introduced a number of progressive reforms in areas such as social security. In April 1996, national elections led to the victory of a centre-left coalition under the leadership of Romano Prodi. The Olive Tree included PDS, PPI (the largest surviving piece of the former DC), and other small parties, with "external support" from the Communist Refoundation Party (voting confidence but not entering government). Prodi's government became the third-longest to stay in power before he narrowly lost a vote of confidence, by three votes, in October 1998. Prodi's programme consisted in restoring the country's economic health, to pursue the then seemingly unreachable goal of leading the country within the strict Euro convergence criteria set at Maastricht and make the country join the Euro. He succeeded in this in little more than six months.

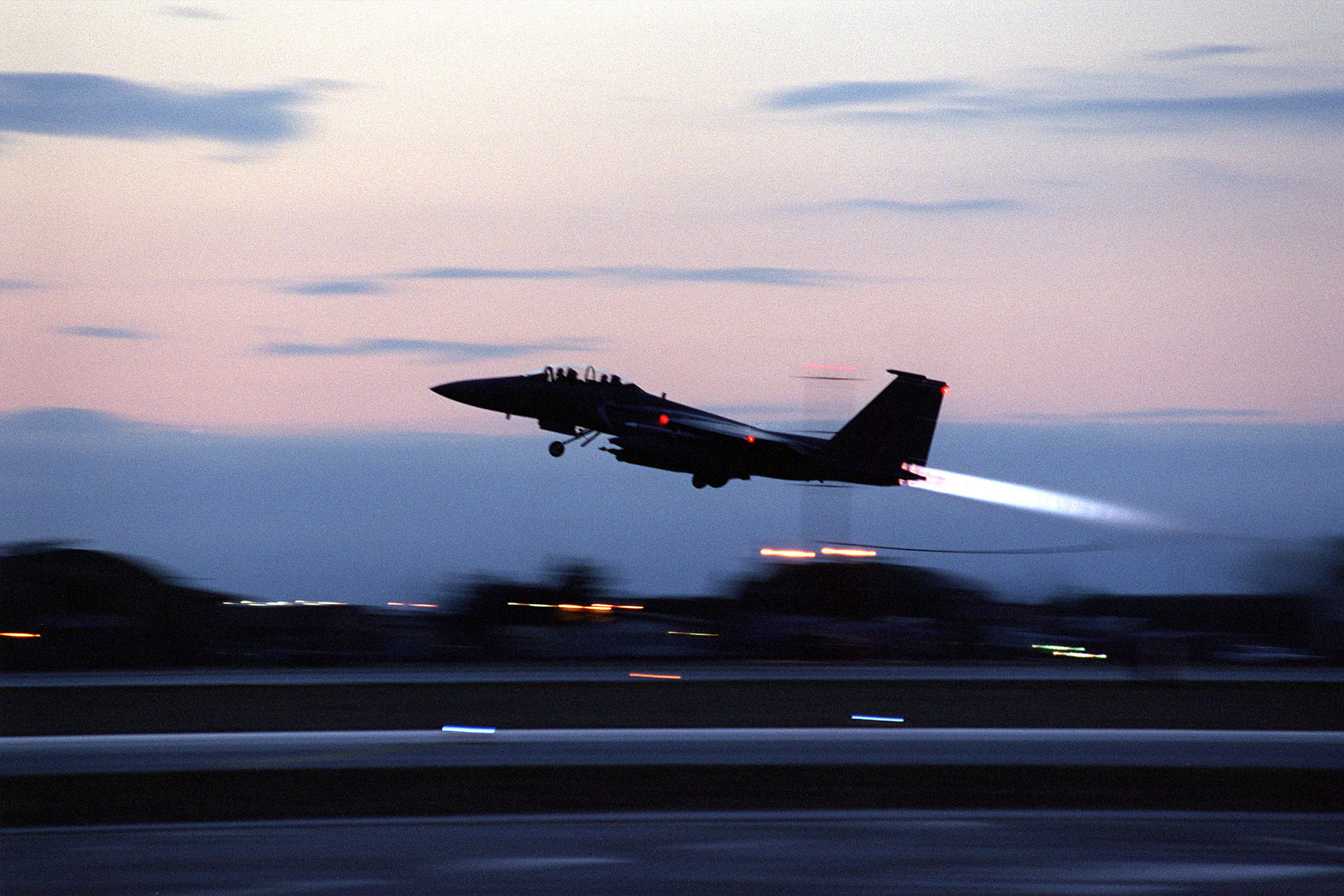
U.S. Air Force F-15E Strike Eagle takes off from Aviano Air Base (1999).

His government fell in 1998 when the Communist Refoundation Party withdrew its support. This led to the formation of a new government led by Massimo D'Alema as prime minister. As the result of a vote of no confidence in Prodi's government, D'Alema's nomination was passed by a single vote, with the support of a loyal Communist faction (PdCI) and of some centrist MPs (UDR) led by former president of the Republic Francesco Cossiga. While D'Alema was prime minister, Italy took part in the NATO bombing of the Federal Republic of Yugoslavia in 1999. The attack was supported by Silvio Berlusconi and the centre-right opposition, but the far left strongly contested it. It was a very important test about the government loyalty to NATO and the country's foreign policy, as it concerned the first post-Communist leader of Italy and the first military action formally outside a UN mandate.

In May 1999, the Parliament selected Carlo Azeglio Ciampi as the president of the Italian Republic. Ciampi, a former prime minister and Minister of the Treasury, and before the governor of the Bank of Italy, was elected on the first ballot with an easy margin over the required two-thirds votes. In April 2000, following poor performance by his coalition in regional elections, D'Alema resigned. The succeeding caretaker centre-left government, including most of the same parties, was headed by Giuliano Amato (who previously served as prime minister in 1992–93) until the 2001 election. A constitutional referendum in 2001 confirmed a constitutional amendment to introduce early federalization, with residual legislative competence upon the Regions instead than upon the State.

=== Berlusconi's first comeback (2001–2006) ===
The May 2001 election, where both coalitions used decoy lists to undermine the proportional-compensation part of the electoral system, ushered a refashioned centre-right coalition, House of Freedoms dominated by Berlusconi's party, Forza Italia (29.2%) and including Alleanza Nazionale (12.5%), the Lega Nord, the Christian Democratic Center and the United Christian Democrats. The Olive Tree coalition (The Daisy (14.5%) and the Democrats of the Left (16.7%)) sat in the opposition.

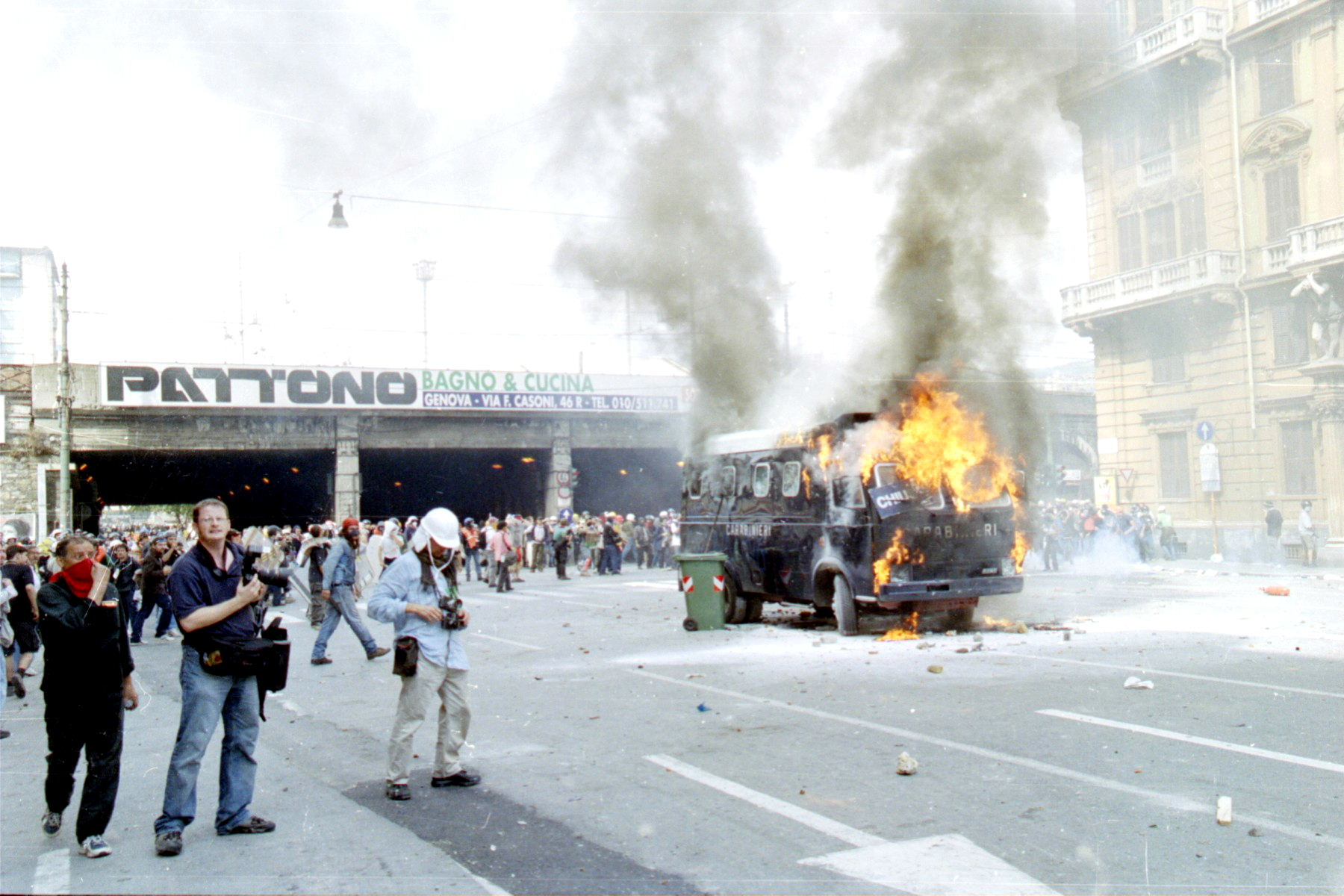
Protesters try to stop members of the G8 from attending the summit during the 27th G8 summit in Genoa, Italy, by burning vehicles on the main route to the summit.

Berlusconi's II foreign policy was characterised by a strong atlanticist trend, coupled with a positive attitude towards Putin's Russia and Erdogan's Turkey. Berlusconi advocated the accession of Turkey to the EU (notwithstanding the opposition of coalition partner Lega Nord) and at the 2002 Rome summit a NATO-Russia Council was set up. In UN reform issues, Italy took the lead of the Uniting for Consensus group, aiming at blocking a new German seat at the UN Security Council, while advocating for a unitary EU seat.

The 27th G8 summit, held in Genoa in July 2001 represented the first international task of the government. The huge protest, mounting to 200,000 demonstrators from all over Europe, was countered by strong police repression. Dozens were hospitalized following clashes with police and night raids by security forces on two schools housing activists and independent journalists. People taken into custody after the raids have alleged severe abuse at the hands of police. One demonstrator was shot dead.

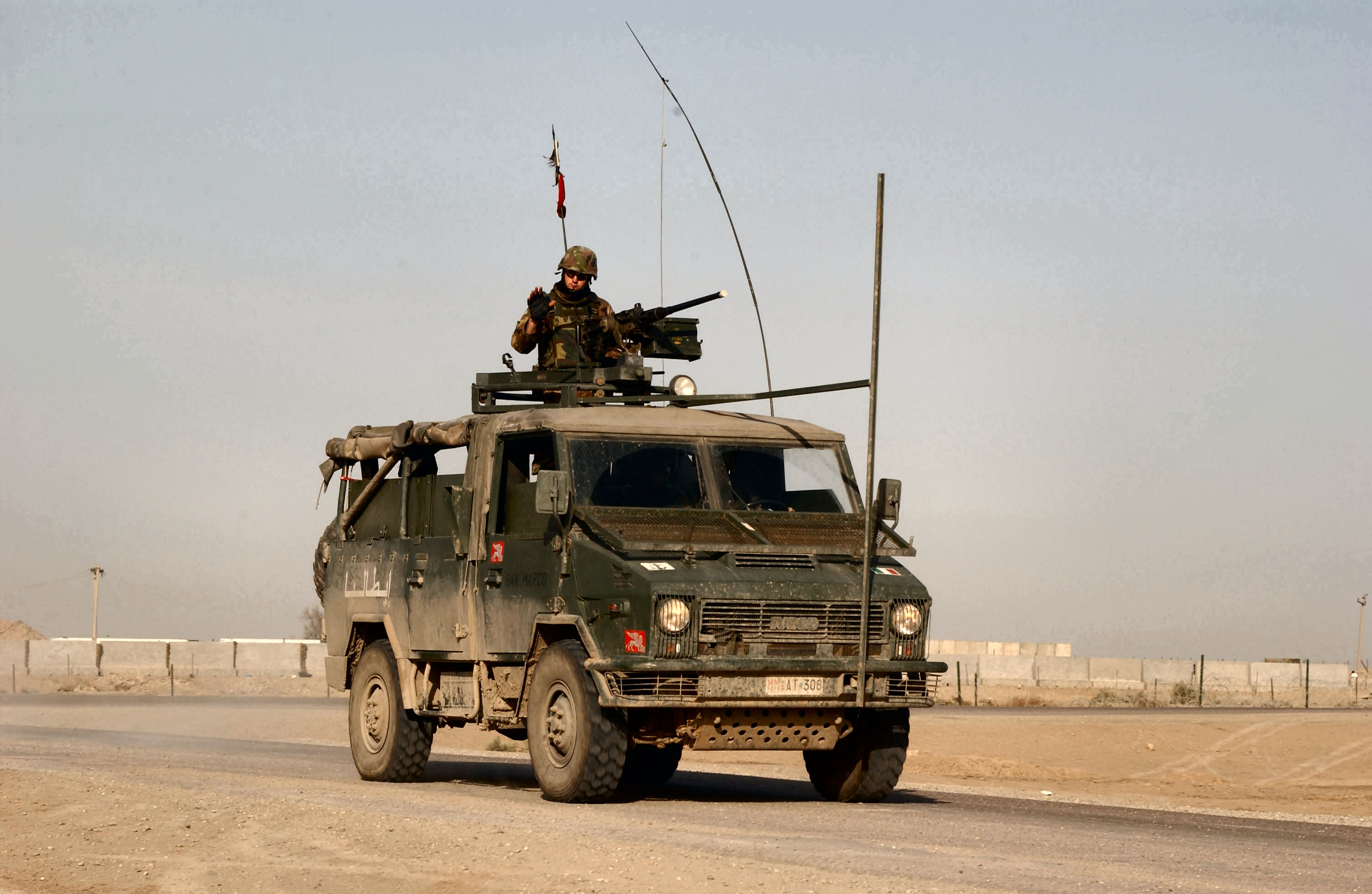
Italian military forces in Iraq (Tallil)

Berlusconi made Italy take part in the Afghanistan war (2001) and in the US-led military coalition in Iraq in 2003, although always stressing that Italy was taking part in a "peace operation" and not in a war operation outside the UN framework (prohibited by art.11 of the Italian Constitution). The move was widely unpopular (especially in the case of Iraq), and was met by protests and manifestations.

Italy's participation in the Iraq war, with the control over the Nassiriya sector was marked by the 2003 Nasiriyah bombing, in which 17 soldiers were killed, and by an incident with the US, concerning the death, by friendly fire, of a SISMI agent, Nicola Calipari, during the March 2005 rescue of Giuliana Sgrena, a reporter from Il Manifesto.

In labour law, the government introduced extensive flexibility through the 30/2003 Act. In the field of justice, a reform of the Right of self-defense Act was introduced to please the Lega Nord. The 2002 Bossi-Fini Act represented a restrictive approach to immigration, while the 2006 Fini-Giovanardi Act strengthened the prohibitionary approach to drug policy. A point-system driver's licence was introduced in 2003, and compulsory conscription was replaced by a professional army since 2005. A constitutional reform including federalization and strengthened executive powers, passed in the Parliament, was rejected by a confirmation referendum in 2006.

Berlusconi's term was widely criticised for the approval of ad personam (personal) laws (usually named from the rapporteur minister or MP), especially in the field of justice, such as:

- the Frattini Act on conflict of interest;
- the 2002 Cirami Act on the recusation of judges by the accused;
- the 2003 Schifani Act, shielding the five highest state posts from criminal proceedings (declared unconstitutional in 2004);
- the 2005 ex-Cirielli Act, about statute of limitations, especially applicable in the case of Cesare Previti, Berlusconi's lawyer;
- the 2006 Pecorella Act, making it impossible for the public prosecutors to appeal a sentence of acquittal (partially declared unconstitutional in 2006);
- the de-criminalisation of false accounting;
- the Gasparri Act on the radio & TV market, making it easier for Mediaset to escape roof limits of advertisement collection, and considered not in compliance with EU Law by the EU Commission;

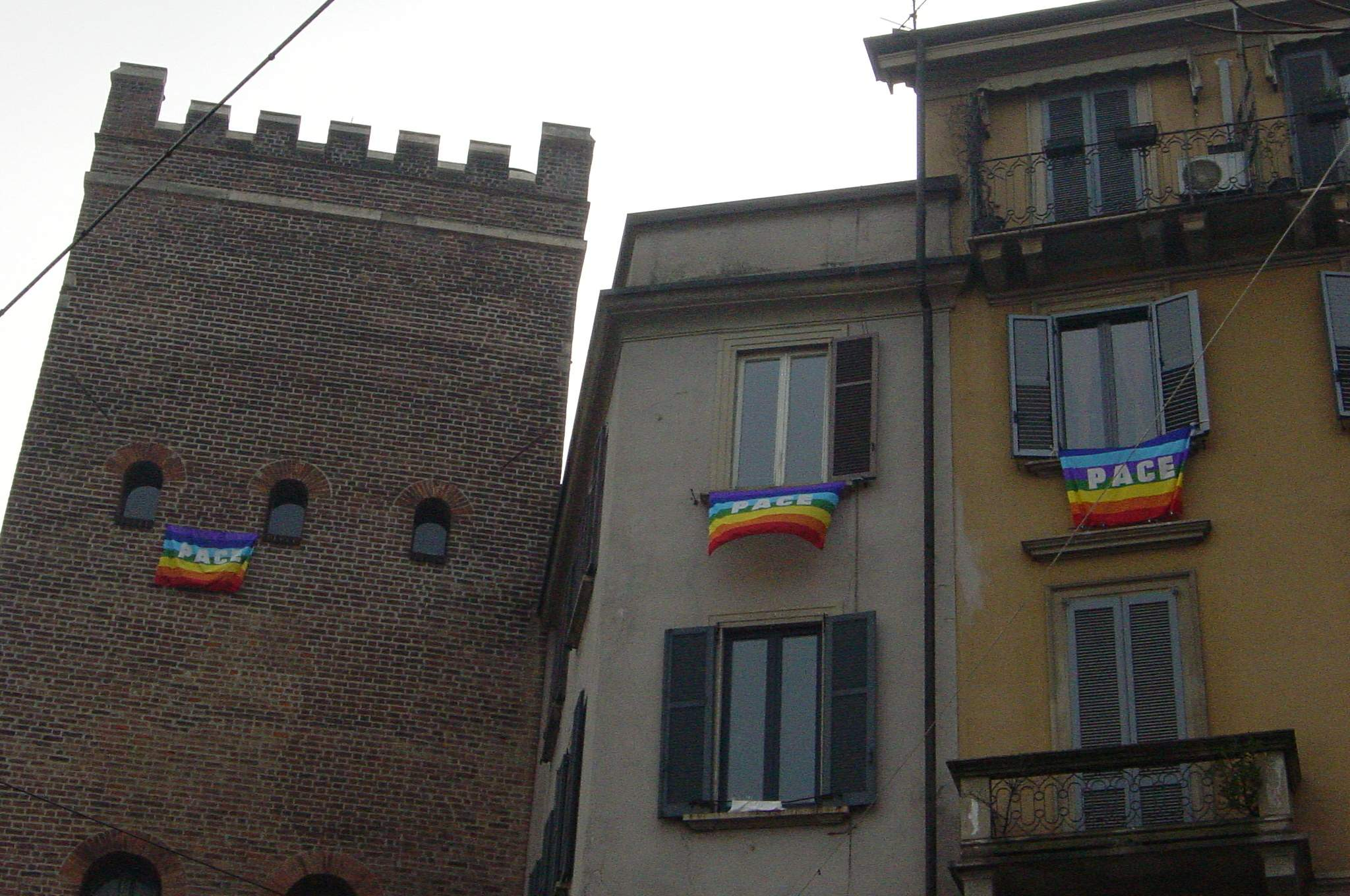
"Pace da tutti i balconi": peace flags hanging from windows in Milan, Italy (March 2003) as over 1,000,000 were hung against the Iraq War

Internally, Berlusconi set up the Mitrokhin Commission, directed by senator Paolo Guzzanti (Forza Italia), to investigate on alleged KGB ties by left-wing (then-opposition) politicians. The commission, closed in March 2006 without producing a final report, was very controversial, in particular after claiming that Romano Prodi, at that time Prime Minister of Italy, and former president of the European Commission, had been "KGB's man in Italy." One of the Senator Guzzanti's informants, Mario Scaramella, was arrested at the end of December 2006 for defamation and arms-trade.

A new electoral law was established in 2005 by the Calderoli Law, and it is a form of semi-proportional representation. A party presents its own closed list and it can join other parties in alliances. The coalition which receives a plurality automatically wins at least 26 seats. Respecting this condition, seats are divided between coalitions, and subsequently to party lists, using the largest remainder method with a Hare quota. To receive seats, a party must overcome the barrage of 8% of the vote if it contests a single race, or of 3% of the vote if it runs in alliance. The change in the electoral law was strongly requested by the UDC, and finally agreed by Berlusconi, although criticised (including by political scientist Giovanni Sartori) for its comeback to proportionalism and its timing, less than one year before general elections. Provision was also included, on the input of Mirko Tremaglia, to ease the vote of Italians resident abroad; paradoxically, Italians abroad proved crucial in securing centre-left victory in 2006 elections.

=== The Union government of Romano Prodi (2006–2008) ===
Romano Prodi, with a centre-left coalition (The Union), won the April 2006 general election by a very narrow margin due to Calderoli new electoral law, although Silvio Berlusconi first refused to acknowledge defeat. Prodi's coalition proved to be extremely frail, as the two-vote margin in the Senate allowed almost any party in the coalition to veto legislation and political views inside the coalition spanned from the left-wing communist parties to the centrist Christian Democrats.

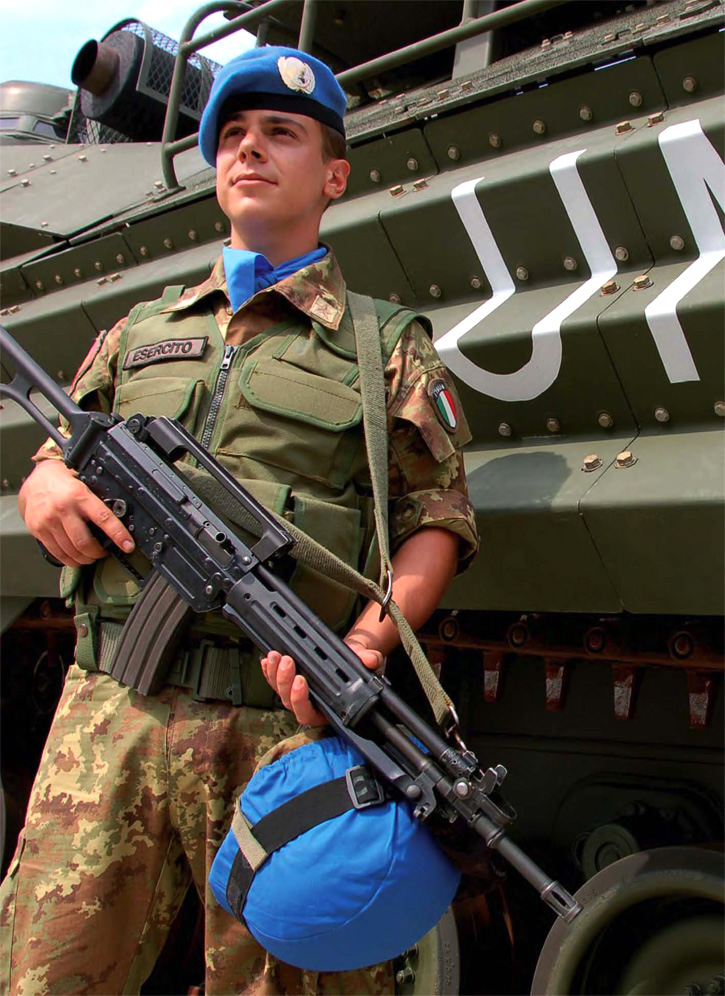
Italian UNIFIL soldier on guard duty in Lebanon

In foreign policy, the Prodi II Cabinet continued the engagement in Afghanistan, under UN command, while withdrawing troops from post-invasion Iraq. The major effort of foreign minister Massimo D'Alema concerned the aftermath of the 2006 Lebanon War, being the first to offer troops to the UN for the constitution of the UNIFIL force, and assuming its command in February 2007. Less than a year after he had won the elections, on 21 February 2007, Prodi tendered his resignation to Head of State Giorgio Napolitano after the government was defeated in the Senate by 2 ballots in a vote on foreign policy. On 24 February, President Napolitano invited him to return to office and face a vote of confidence.

Major causes of friction inside the coalition were, the 2006 pardon Act (criticised by the right and by the IDV party), a draft bill to establish civil unions (vetoed by Christian Democrats), Italy's continued involvement in Afghanistan (strongly opposed by left-wing parties), and finally the much publicized house-arrest of Clemente Mastella's wife (then a prominent politician at the regional level) over a corruption scandal. Mastella's party, UDEUR, held just enough seats in the Senate that his eventual decision to withdraw its support for the government meant the end of the legislature on 6 February 2008. Mastella, who also resigned from his office as Minister of Justice, cited the lack of personal support from his coalition partners' as one of the reasons behind his decision, together with a proposed reform of the electoral system which would have made it difficult for small parties like his own to gain seats in the Italian Parliament.

=== Berlusconi's third term (2008–2011) ===
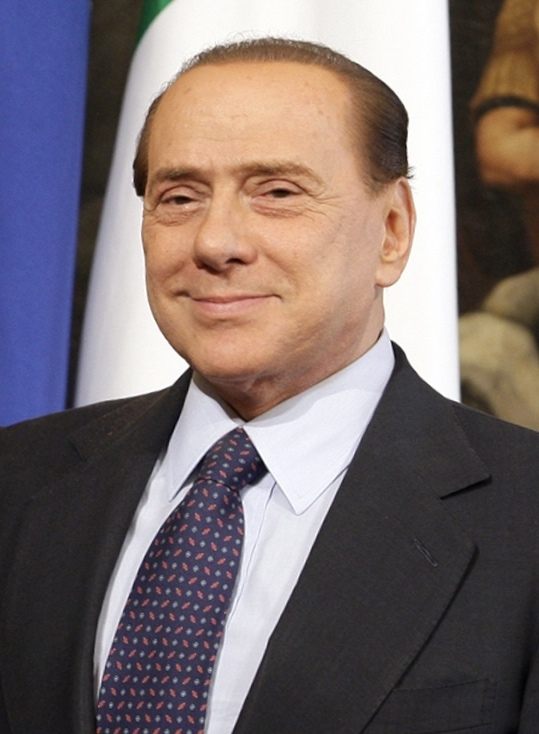
Silvio Berlusconi, Prime Minister from 1994 to 1995, from 2001 to 2006 and from 2008 to 2011

Berlusconi won the last snap elections in 2008, with the People of Freedom party (fusion of his previous Forza Italia party and of Fini's Alleanza Nazionale) against Walter Veltroni of the Democratic Party.

The electoral campaign was waged by Berlusconi on the tones of criminal insecurity brought in the country by the 2006 pardon act, on the Naples waste management issue (although this will remain haunting the government in the following years), on the need to avoid bankruptcy of Alitalia or its takeover by Air France, on the need to limit the use of wiretapping by prosecutors and magistrates to avoid judicial prosecution of citizens, and on the abolition of the local council property tax.

The 2008 Lodo Alfano Act (declared unconstitutional in 2009) granted immunity from prosecution to the four highest political offices in Italy, including Berlusconi. The 2009 Maroni decree (dubbed security package) includes a set of measures against criminality and illegal immigration, allowing for the use of private patrols (however with modest actual impact), criminalisation of stalking and compulsory incarceration for sex offenses. The 2009 fiscal shield provided for the regularisation of capitals illegally detained abroad; local council property tax was abolished the same year.

A Treaty of Friendship was signed between Italy and Libya in 2008 in Benghazi. The treaty provides for the closure of colonial contentious, upon investments from Italy for 5 bln € in 20 years in infrastructure in Libya; for the mutual commitment not to act in a hostile way (criticised as not legally compliant with Italy's NATO obligations). Libyan Dictator Muammar al-Gaddafi subsequently visited Rome in June, July and August 2009, sparkling controversies for his initiatives and speeches. The Berlusconi government was criticised for the lack of firmness toward the Libyan autocracy and the lack of requests of respect of human rights.

The case of Eluana Englaro (who had been comatose for 17 years) re-ignited the debate on the right to die in Italy. After the family of Eluana Englaro succeeded in having her right to die recognised by the judges and getting doctors to stop her forced feeding in the way established by the court, the government issued a legally controversial decree to stop the doctor from letting her die, thrusting Italy into a constitutional crisis when the president Giorgio Napolitano refused to sign the decree. The crisis was defused by Eluana's final death.

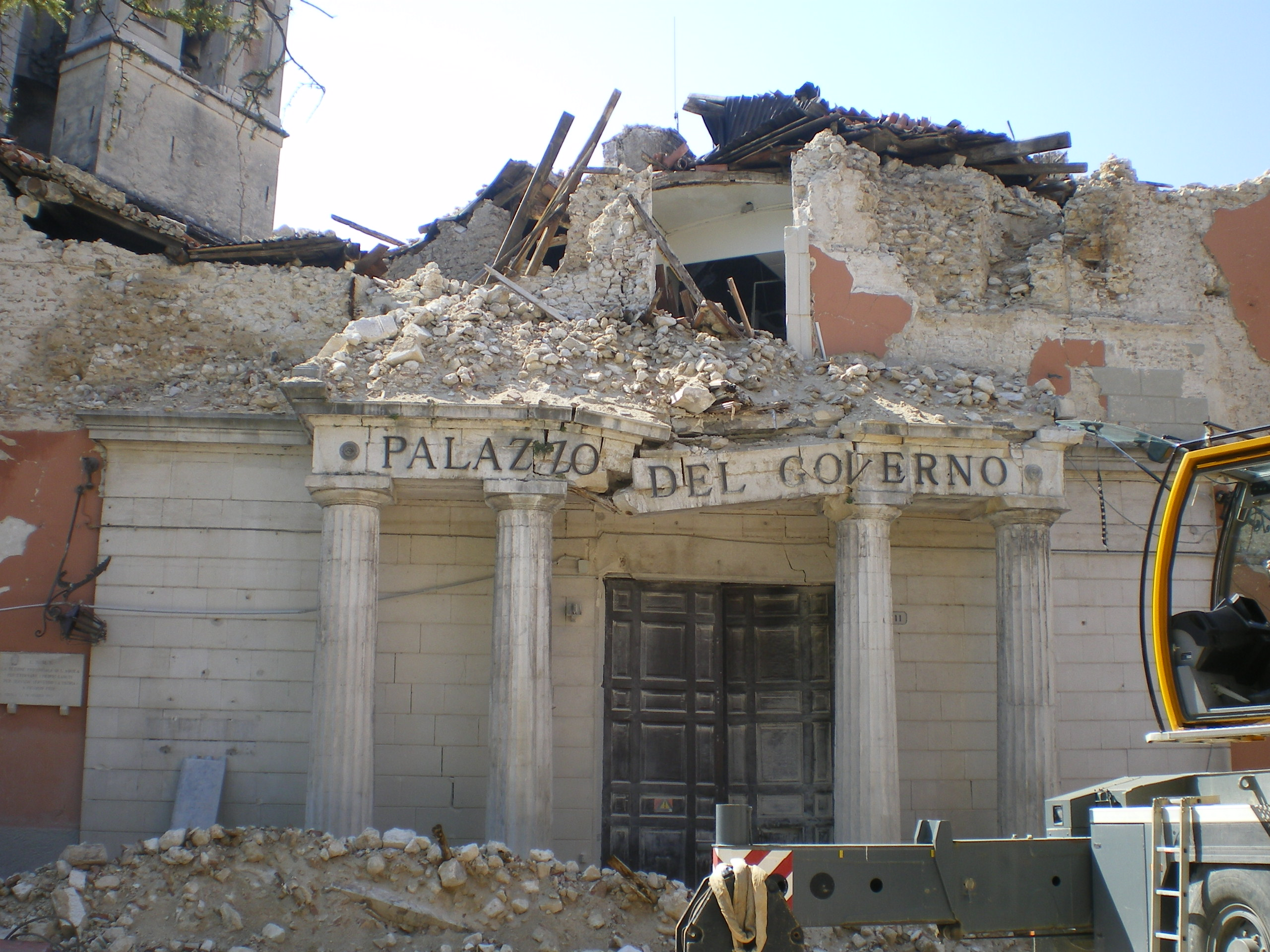
The L'Aquila prefecture (a government office) damaged by the earthquake

The 2009 L'Aquila earthquake caused the death of 308 persons and made about 65,000 homeless. Berlusconi made a point of honour of the reconstruction, although this was accompanied by criticisms, especially by the inhabitants of L'Aquila. The 35th G8 summit of 2009 was hastily moved from La Maddalena to L'Aquila in an effort to promote reconstruction.

On 13 December 2009, Berlusconi was hit in the face with an alabaster statuette of Milan Cathedral after a rally in Milan's Piazza Duomo, suffering facial and teeth injuries. The attacker was found to have a history of mental illness but no previous criminal record. Between 2009 and 2010, Berlusconi was involved in a prostitution scandal leading to his divorce: he was revealed to having had close acquaintance with pre-18-year-old girls, and several call girls presented proofs of having had sex with him and having been paid for that. In one case, Berlusconi was accused of using his influence to obtain the release of a 17-year-old Moroccan girl, of his acquaintance, who was arrested for theft; Berlusconi pretended she was a close relative of Hosni Mubarak.

In 2010, Berlusconi's party saw the splintering of Gianfranco Fini's new faction, which formed a parliamentary group and voted against him in a no-confidence vote on 14 December 2010. Berlusconi's government was able to avoid no-confidence thanks to support from sparse MPs, but lost a consistent majority in the lower Chamber. A controversial university reform was passed in late 2010 and carries the name of Education minister Mariastella Gelmini. Berlusconi's already low international credibility fell further in 2011 during the Euro area crisis. Financial markets showed their disapproval through an unsustainable increase of spreads between Italian and German government bond yields. Berlusconi resigned in November 2011; he later blamed German chancellor Angela Merkel.

=== Monti government (2011–2013) ===
On 12 November 2011, Mario Monti was invited by President Giorgio Napolitano to form a new technocratic government following Berlusconi's resignation. Monti's government was made up of non-political figures but received very wide support in Parliament, both on the centre-right and on the centre-left; the Northern League was in opposition. Monti proceeded to implement structural reforms and to cut government expenses.

=== Coalition governments (2013–2021) ===
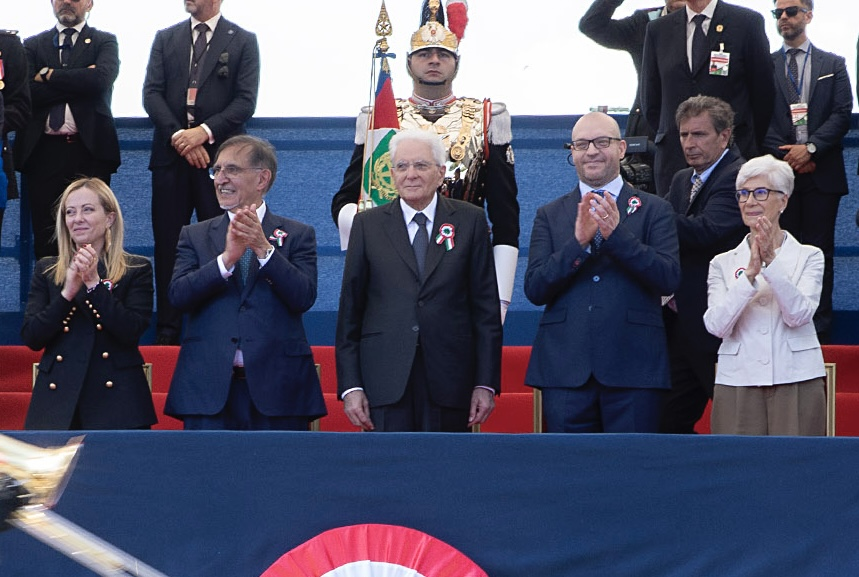
The most important offices of the Italian State have pinned on the jacket, during the military parade of the Festa della Repubblica celebrated every 2 June, a cockade of Italy.

After the general election held on 24 and 25 February 2013, the centre-left alliance Italy Common Good led by the Democratic Party obtained a clear majority of seats in the Chamber of Deputies, thanks to a majority bonus that has effectively trebled the number of seats assigned to the winning force, while in the popular vote it narrowly defeated the centre-right alliance of former prime minister Silvio Berlusconi. Close behind, the new anti-establishment Five Star Movement of comedian Beppe Grillo became the third force, clearly ahead of the centrist coalition of outgoing Prime Minister Mario Monti. In the Senate, no political group or party won an outright majority, resulting in a hung parliament.

On 22 April 2013, the President of the Republic, Giorgio Napolitano, after his re-election and consultations with the political forces, gave to the vice-secretary of the Democratic Party, Enrico Letta, the task of forming a government, because Pier Luigi Bersani, leader of the winning centre-left coalition Italy Common Good, could not form a government because it did not have a majority in the Senate.

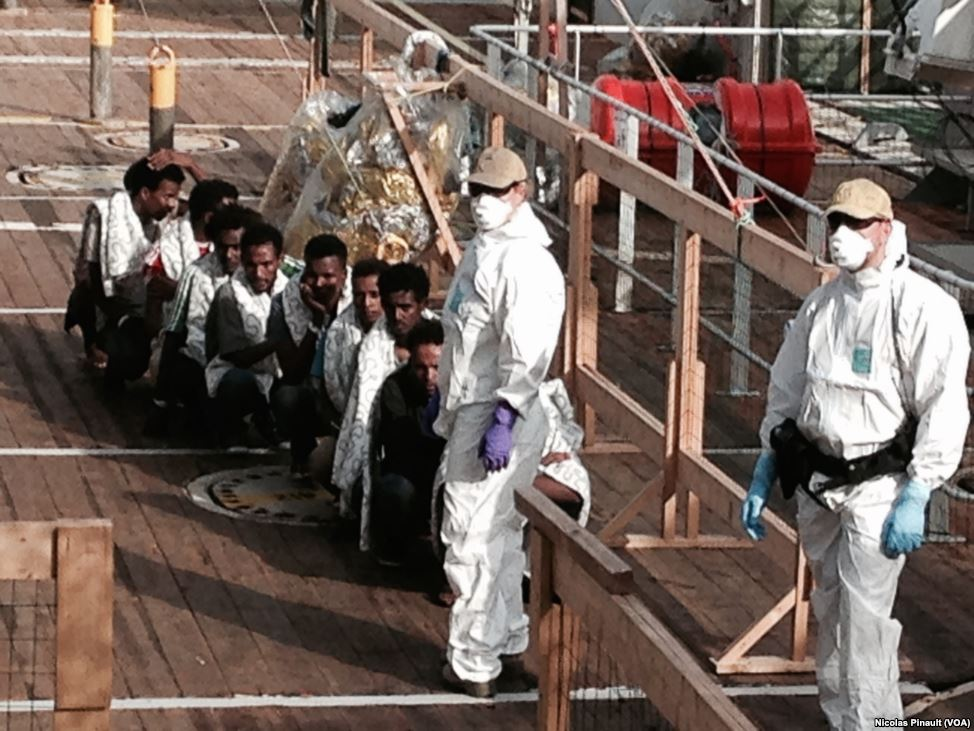
Asylum seekers arrive in Sicily, 2015. The Arab Spring and the Syrian War caused a migrant crisis that saw hundred of thousands of people seeking refuge by sea in Italy and other Mediterranean countries.

In the European migrant crisis of the 2010s, Italy was the entry point and leading destination for most asylum seekers entering the EU. From 2013 to 2018, the country took in over 700,000 migrants and refugees, mainly from sub-Saharan Africa, which caused strain on the public purse and a surge in the support for far-right or Eurosceptic political parties.

Letta's cabinet lasted until 22 February 2014, as the government fell apart after the Democratic Party retired its support of Letta in favour of Matteo Renzi, the mayor of Florence and nicknamed il Rottamatore ("The Scrapper", or "The Wrecker"). Renzi succeeded Letta as prime minister at the head of a new grand coalition government with Democratic Party, New Centre-Right, Civic Choice, and a number of minor parties. The Renzi Cabinet is the youngest government of Italy up to date, with an average age of 47. In addition, it is also the first in which the number of female ministers is equal to the number of male ministers.

On 31 January 2015 Sergio Mattarella, judge of the Constitutional Court, former DC minister and former member of the PD, was elected President of the Italian Republic at the fourth ballot with 665 votes out of 1,009, with support from the government parties, Left Ecology Freedom, and non-party independents. Mattarella was officially endorsed by the Democratic Party, after his name was put forward by the Prime Minister Matteo Renzi. Mattarella replaced Giorgio Napolitano, who had served for nine years, the longest presidency in the history of the Italian Republic at the time.

The Renzi cabinet had several new laws passed: labour was reformed (Jobs act), same-sex unions were recognized, and a new electoral system was approved (labelled Italicum). The latter, however, was eventually abolished by the Constitutional Court. The government also tried to amend the Constitution to reform the composition and powers of the Parliament: however, when the voters were called to confirm or reject the reform through referendum, the majority (59%) voted against it.

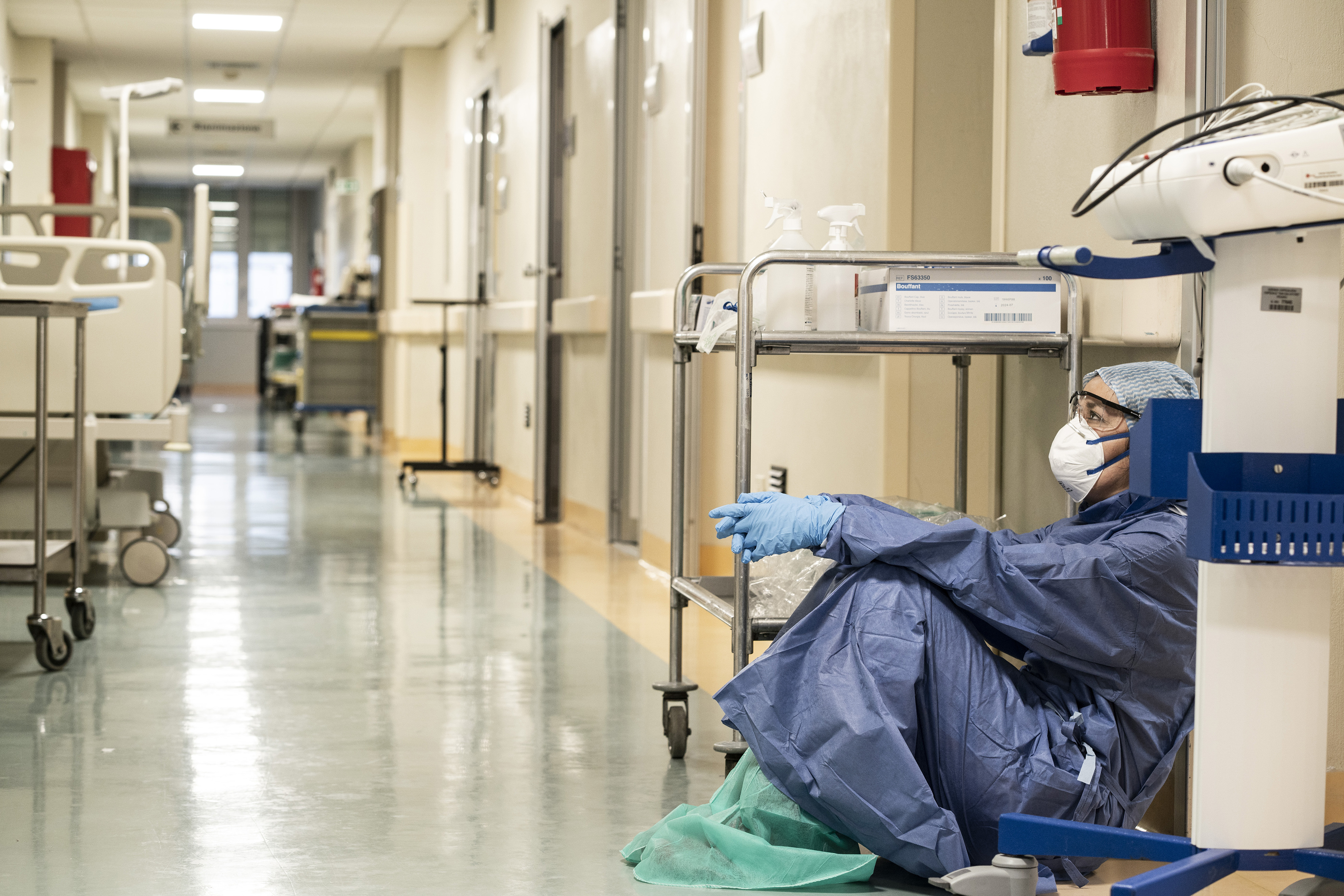
Exhausted nurse takes a break in an Italian hospital during the COVID-19 emergency.

Renzi and his government resigned and President Mattarella appointed new prime minister, Renzi's minister of Foreign Affairs Paolo Gentiloni, who led Italy until the 2018 Italian general election, where the first party of Parliament become the anti-establishment Five Star Movement.

Through an alliance with Matteo Salvini's eurosceptical Lega Nord, Five Star Movement proposed to President Mattarella the appointment of Giuseppe Conte as new prime minister of a coalition government. After a failed attempt, caused by the veto of President Mattarella to the appointment of Paolo Savona as Minister of Finance, Conte formed the new government (Conte I Cabinet). In August 2019, after the 2019 European Parliament election where Lega Nord exceeded the Five Star Movement, and the increase of the tension between the political parties, Lega Nord proposed a no-confidence vote versus Conte, so the Prime Minister resigned. After new consultations, President Mattarella reappointed Conte as prime minister in a coalition government between the Five Star Movement and the Democratic Party, led by the new Secretary Nicola Zingaretti (Conte II Cabinet).

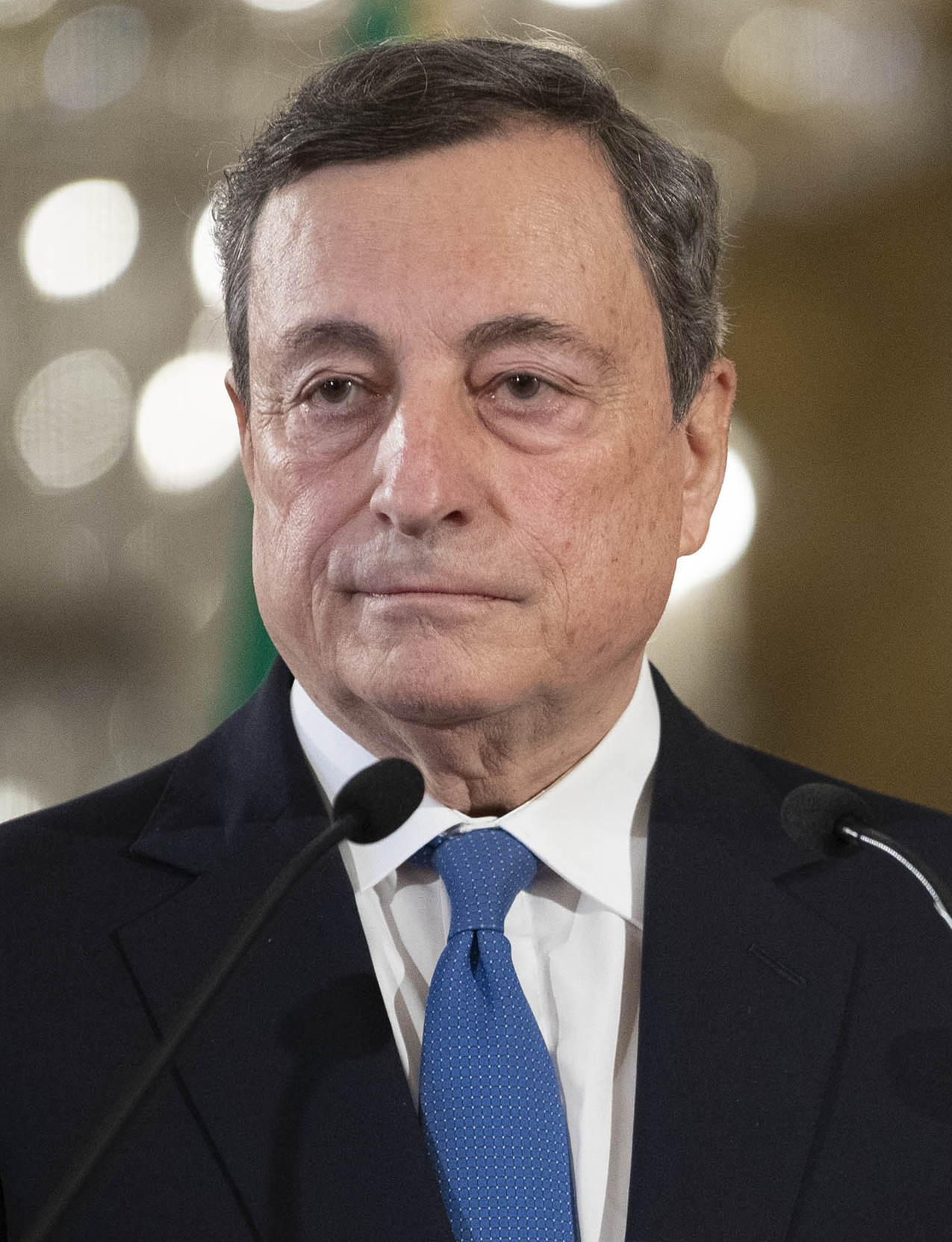
Mario Draghi, former president of the European Central Bank and Italian Prime Minister of a coalition government 2021-2022

In 2020, Italy was hit by the COVID-19 pandemic, along with several other countries. The Italian government implemented restrictive measures of social distancing and lockdown with the aim to slow down contagion. In January 2021, after some week of tension, the Conte II government lost the support of Italia Viva, the political party of former prime minister Renzi. Conte, after some attempts to remain at the head of government, was therefore forced to resign.

=== Draghi government (2021–2022) ===
President Mattarella, because of the severe nature of the economic and pandemic crises, appointed a new prime minister of a grand coalition government, former president of the European Central Bank, Mario Draghi, who led a cabinet with the support of all political parties in Parliament, except the right-wing party Brothers of Italy.

Thanks to a massive influx of vaccine doses, it was possible to accelerate the vaccination campaign against COVID-19 pandemic (with 85% of the population over-12 vaccinated at the end of December 2021). The National Recovery and Resilience Plan (PNRR) was also drawn up and started to apply, a document that established the intended use of the Next Generation EU funds and loans due to Italy.

In January 2022, Italian President Sergio Mattarella was re-elected to serve a second consecutive seven-year term. On 21 July 2022, following a government crisis which ended with FI, League and the M5S deciding to withdraw their support to the government, Prime Minister Draghi resigned. President Sergio Mattarella consequently dissolved the Parliament and called a snap election, which resulted in the centre-right coalition gaining an absolute majority of seats.

=== Meloni government (2022–present) ===
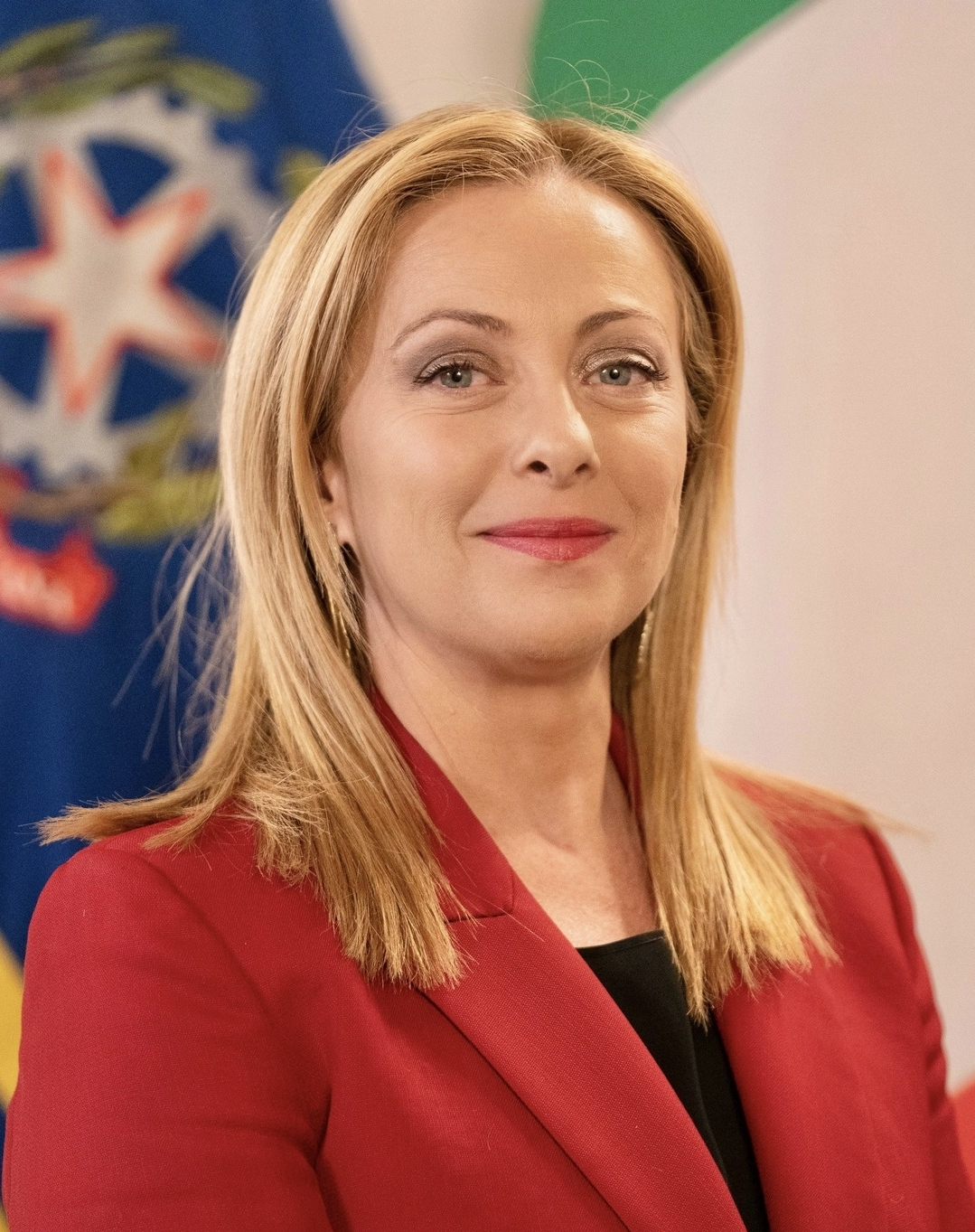
Giorgia Meloni, Prime Minister since 2022

On 22 October 2022, Giorgia Meloni was sworn in as Italy's first female prime minister. Her Brothers of Italy party formed a right-wing government with the far-right League and centre-right Forza Italia of ex-prime minister Silvio Berlusconi. The Meloni government is the 68th government of the Italian Republic. The government was announced on 21 October 2022 and was officially sworn in on the next day. It was one of the fastest government formations in the history of the Italian Republic. It was variously described as a shift to the political right, as well as the first far-right-led coalition in Italy since World War II.

== See also ==
- Autonomism
- History of Europe
- History of the European Union
- List of presidents of Italy
- List of prime ministers of Italy
- Operation Gladio

== Sources ==
- Baquiast, Paul; Dupuy, Emmanuel; Ridolfi, Maurizio (2007). L'idée républicaine en Europe (xviii^{e} – xxi^{e} siècle): histoire et pensée universelle, Europe - La République universelle (in French). Vol. 1. L'Harmattan. ISBN 978-2296027954.
- Bartolotta, Francesco (1971). Parlamenti e Governi d'Italia dal 1848 al 1970 (in Italian). Vol. I. Vito Bianco Editore. [ISBN unspecified]
- Dreyfus, Michel (2000). "Carlo Rosselli, les néo-socialistes et la crise du socialisme international". Matériaux pour l'histoire de notre temps (in French). 57 (57): 22–28. doi:10.3406/mat.2000.404234.
- Foro, Philippe (2006). L'Italie fasciste (in French). Éditions Armand Colin. ISBN 978-2200269944.
- Garrone, Alessandro Galante (1973). I radicali in Italia (1849-1925) (in Italian). Garzanti. [ISBN unspecified]
- Guichonnet, Paul (1975). Histoire de l'Italie (in French). Presses universitaires de France. [ISBN unspecified]
- Mack Smith, Denis (1990). I Savoia re d'Italia (in Italian). Bur. ISBN 978-8817115674.
- Nobécourt, Jacques (2 June 1986). "Il y a quarante ans, l'Italie devient République". Le Monde (in French).
- Ridolfi, Maurizio (2003). Almanacco della Repubblica. Storia d'Italia attraverso le tradizioni, le istituzioni e le simbologie repubblicane (in Italian). Mondadori Bruno. ISBN 978-8842494997.
- Romeo, Rosario (2011). Vita di Cavour (in Italian). Editori Laterzi. ISBN 978-8842074915.
- Spadolini, Giovanni (1989). L'opposizione laica nell'Italia moderna (1861-1922) (in Italian). Le Monnier. ISBN 978-8800856256.
