= Mitterrand doctrine =

French policy on extradition

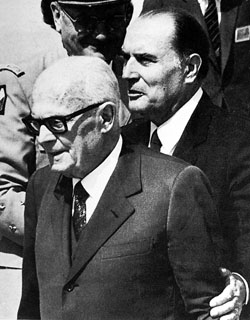
Mitterrand and Sandro Pertini in 1982

The Mitterrand doctrine (French: Doctrine Mitterrand) is a policy established in 1985 by French president François Mitterrand concerning Italian fugitives convicted in connection with left-wing terrorism in Italy during the Years of Lead. Mitterrand promised that fugitives resident in France would not be extradited to Italy, excluding those who committed "active, actual, bloody terrorism".

The Mitterrand Doctrine was softened in 2002, under the government of Jean-Pierre Raffarin during the presidency of Jacques Chirac, when Paolo Persichetti was extradited from France. However, it continued to remain in effect, with the extradition of 10 former militants to Italy blocked by the French Court of Cassation in 2023.

== Establishment ==
Mitterrand defined his doctrine during a speech at the Palais des sports in Rennes on February 1, 1985. Mitterrand excluded active terrorists from the protection. On 21 April 1985, at the 65th Congress of the Human Rights League (LDH), he declared that Italian criminals who had broken with their violent past and had fled to France would be protected from extradition to Italy:

"Italian refugees (...) who took part in terrorist action before 1981 (...) have broken links with the infernal machine in which they participated, have begun a second phase of their lives, have integrated into French society (...) I told the Italian government that they were safe from any sanction by the means of extradition".

The policy statement was followed by French justice when it came to the extradition of far-left Italian terrorists or activists. According to a 2007 article by the Corriere della Sera, Mitterrand was convinced by Abbé Pierre to protect those persons. According to Cesare Battisti's lawyers, Mitterrand had given his word in consultation with the Italian prime minister, the fellow socialist Bettino Craxi.

== In practice ==
The commitment was first broken with the 2002 extradition of Paolo Persichetti, a former member of the Red Brigades, which was approved by the Raffarin government.

Opponents of the doctrine point out that what a president can say during his tenure is not a source of law and so the doctrine has no legal value. Proponents point out that it was nevertheless consistently applied until 2002 and consider that the former president had committed the country by his words.

Its supporters (intellectuals like Fred Vargas or Bernard-Henri Lévy, organizations such as the Greens, the Human Rights League, France Libertés, Attac-France etc.), along with some personalities of the Socialist Party (PS), are opposed to noncompliance with the Mitterrand doctrine by the right in power.

The doctrine has been strongly criticized by the Italian Association of Victims of Terrorism (Associazione italiana vittime del terrorismo or AIVITER), which in 2008 expressed particular

pain for the consequences of the Mitterrand doctrine and the attitude of French leftist intellectuals.

French President Jacques Chirac said that he would not oppose the extradition of persons wanted by the Italian courts.

== Continuation ==
The Mitterrand doctrine was based on the supposed superiority of French law and its greater adherence to European standards and principles concerning the protection of human rights, especially with regard to in absentia trials. Italy at the time did not guarantee a second trial after an in absentia trial, which meant that convicted people extradited to Italy might never be able to defend themselves in person. By comparison, France allowed a second trial through the process of purgation in the absence.

In 2001 the European Court of Human Rights (EHCR) ruled that the French purgation in the absence process also violated Article 6 of the European Convention (the right to a fair trial), because the person had no lawyer defending them at the first in absentia trial. In response, in 2004 France amended its procedure for in absentia trials to allow for defence by a lawyer. The current in absentia procedure is defined as par défaut and allows for the defence by a lawyer.

In 2002, France extradited Paolo Persichetti, an ex-member of the Red Brigades (BR) who was lecturing in sociology, in breach of the Mitterrand doctrine. However, in 1998, Bordeaux's appeal court had judged that Sergio Tornaghi could not be extradited to Italy on the grounds that Italian procedure would not organise a second trial after the first trial in absentia. The extraditions in the 2000s involved not only BR members but also other leftist activists who had fled to France and were being sought by Italian justice.

In 2004, French judicial officials authorised the extradition of Cesare Battisti. In 2005 the Conseil d'État confirmed the extradition and softening the Mitterrand doctrine. Battisti had already fled to Mexico and subsequently to Brazil, where he lived as fugitive for the following 14 years. In 2018, when Brazil revoked his protection, he fled again to Bolivia and unsuccessfully sought asylum. He was arrested and extradited to Italy to expiate his sentence of life imprisonment for four murders.

In 2005, Gilles Martinet, an old socialist intellectual and former ambassador to Italy, wrote in the preface to a book that was dedicated to the Battisti case, "Not being able to make a revolution in our country, we continue to dream of it elsewhere. It continues to exist the need to prove ourselves that we are always on the left and that we have not departed from the ideal".

In 2021, 10 Italian fugitives in France were arrested, with plans made to extradite them to Italy. They had been convicted of acts including murders and kidnappings. French authorities stated that their extradition would fall in line with the Mitterrand doctrine, as it did not necessarily apply to violent criminals. However, France's Court of Cassation rejected the extradition attempt in 2023, allowing the 10 to remain in France.

As of 2021, Italy continued to seek the extradition of roughly 200 people residing in France.

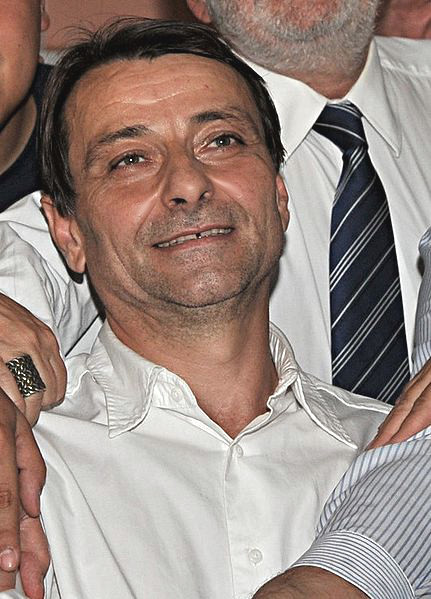
Cesare Battisti, pictured in 2009, was arrested in 2019 after 38 years of hiding.

The list of Italians who benefited from the Mitterrand doctrine include:

- Toni Negri;
- Cesare Battisti, sentenced to life imprisonment for four murders;
- Paolo Persichetti;
- Sergio Tornaghi;
- Oreste Scalzone;
- Marina Petrella;
- Franco Piperno;
- Lanfranco Pace;
- Enrico Villimburgo and Roberta Cappelli, sentenced to life imprisonment for murder;
- Giovanni Alimonti and Maurizio di Marzio, sentenced respectively to 22 and 15 years for a series of attacks;
- Enzo Calvitti, sentenced to 21 years for attempted murder;
- Vincenzo Spano, considered one of the leaders of the Organized Committees for the Liberation of the Proletariat;
- Massimo Carfora, who was sentenced to life imprisonment;
- Giovanni Vegliacasa, member of Prima Linea;
- Walter Grecchi, sentenced to 14 years for the murder of a police officer;
- Giorgio Pietrostefani, sentenced to 22 years in prison along with Sofri and Bompressi for the murder of prosecutor Calabresi;
- Simonetta Giorgieri and Carla Vendetti, suspected of contacts with the new Red Brigades, may also still be in France.

== Reasons ==
The Mitterrand doctrine was supported by French intellectuals on the alleged nonconformity of Italian legislation with European standards and, in the 21st century, the age of the fugitives.

The French President opposed aspects of the anti-terrorist laws passed in Italy during the 1970s and the 1980s that created the status of collaboratore di giustizia" ("collaborators with justice" known commonly as pentito), similar to the crown witness legislation in the United Kingdom and the Witness Protection Program in the United States in which people charged with crimes may become witnesses for the state and possibly receive reduced sentences and protection.

Italian legislation also provided that if a defendant can conduct his defence via his lawyers, trials held in absentia did not need to be repeated if he was eventually apprehended. The Italian in absentia procedure was upheld by the European Court of Human Rights (ECHR).

== Film ==
- After the War (2017)

== See also ==
- History of the Italian Republic
- Strategy of tension
