= Marina Petrella =

Italian assassin

- Born: Marina Petrella; 23 August 1954 (age 71); Rome (Italy)
- Organization: Red Brigades
- Height: 1.60 m (5 ft 3 in)

Marina Petrella (born in Roma, 23 August 1954) is a former member of the Italian militant group the Red Brigades. She was convicted to life sentence for murder.

A former school teacher in the mid 1970s she joined the Red Brigades. Together with her husband, Luigi Novelli, she was arrested twice, but was never sent to jail because a verdict was not reached in time.

In 1993, she left Italy to avoid being arrested following her conviction of killing a policeman, various attempted murders and other minor offenses. She moved to Paris where, thanks to the Mitterrand doctrine, she started a new life. She was arrested by the French, but the government of Nicolas Sarkozy announced that Petrella would not be extradited to Italy on medical grounds.

On April 28 2021, she was again arrested together with six other former Red Brigades members living in France. Her extradition was blocked by the French Court in 2022. in 2023 the French Court of Cassation denied her extradition as well.
