= Autonomia Operaia =

Italian political movement

Workers' Autonomy Autonomia Operaia
- Abbreviation: Aut. Op.
- Leader: Toni Negri; Oreste Scalzone; Franco Piperno; Bifo Berardi; Paolo Virno
- Founded: 3 March 1973
- Dissolved: 7 April 1979
- Preceded by: Potere Operaio
- Newspaper: Rosso (Milan); I Volsci (Rome); A/traverso (Bologna)
- Ideology: Autonomist Marxism; Operaismo; Anti-authoritarianism; Libertarian Marxism; Direct action Abolition of work
- Political position: Far-left

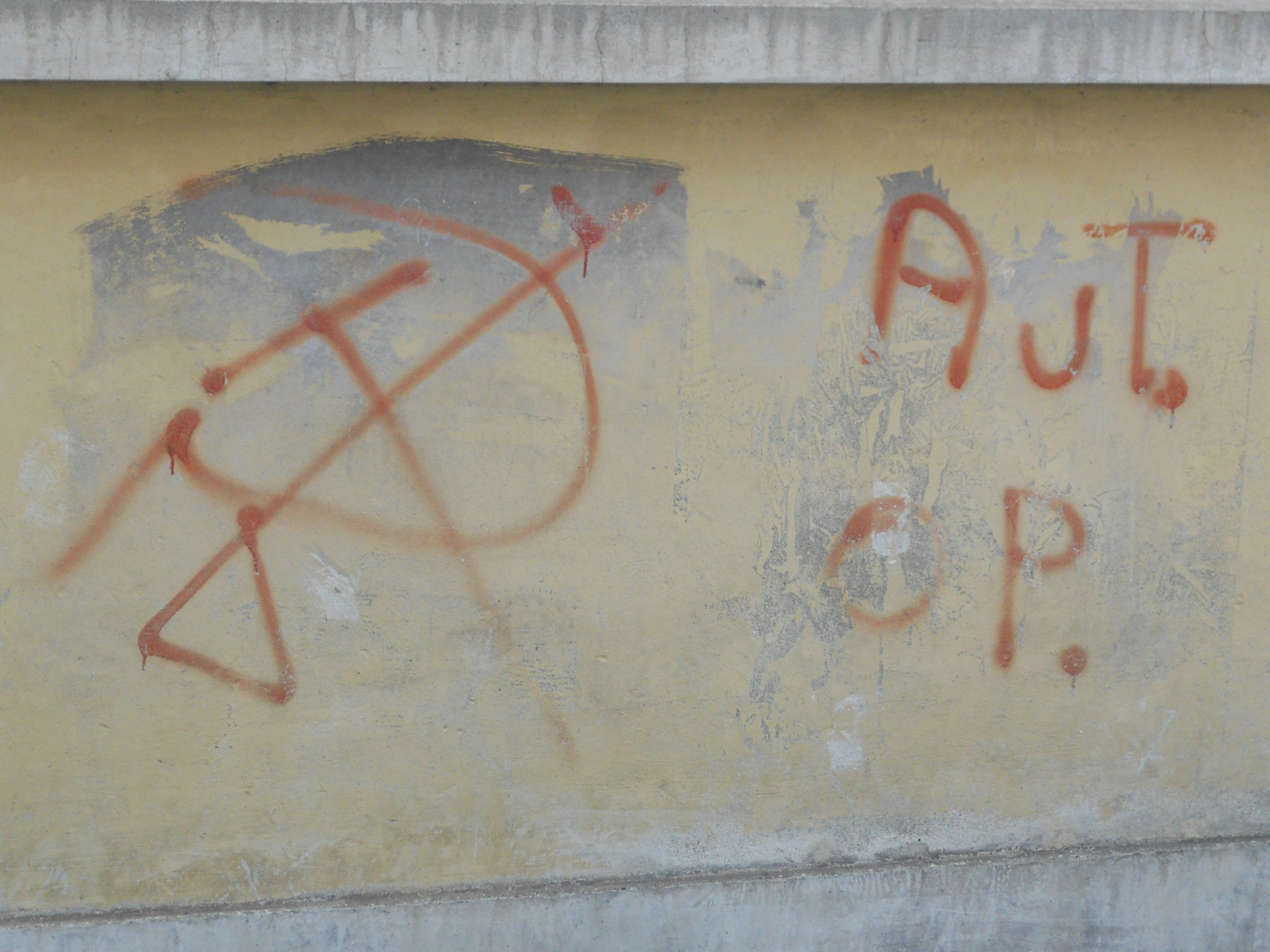
Autonomia Operaia graffiti in Turin, written in 1977

Autonomia Operaia (Italian for "Workers' Autonomy") was an Italian far-left movement particularly active from 1973 to 1979. It played an important role in the Italian autonomist movement in the 1970s, alongside earlier organisations such as Potere Operaio, which was created after May 1968, and Lotta Continua.

== History ==
=== Formation ===
The autonomist movement gathered itself around the free radio movement, such as Onda Rossa in Rome, Radio Alice in Bologna, Controradio in Firenze, Radio Sherwood in Padova, and other local radios, giving it a diffusion in the whole country. It also published several newspapers and magazines which were circulated nationally, including Rosso in Milan, I Volsci in Rome, Autonomia in Padua and A/traverso in Bologna. It was a decentralized, localist network or "area" of movements, particularly strong in Rome, Milan, Padua and Bologna, but at its height in 1977 was also often present in small towns and villages where not even the Italian Communist Party (PCI) was present.

There was also an armed tendency known as autonomia armata (armed autonomy).

People such as Oreste Scalzone, Franco Piperno, professor in Calabria University, Antonio Negri in Padova or Franco Berardi, a.k.a. Bifo, at Radio Alice were the movement's most well-known figures. The movement became particularly active in March 1977, after the police in Bologna killed Francesco Lo Russo, a member of Lotta Continua. This event sparked a series of demonstrations in various parts of Italy. Bologna University and the Sapienza University of Rome were occupied by students. On orders from Interior Minister Francesco Cossiga the carabinieri surrounded Bologna's university area. This repression met with some international protest, in particular from French philosophers Michel Foucault, Jean-Paul Sartre, Gilles Deleuze and Félix Guattari, who also denounced the Italian Communist Party's (PCI) opposition to the University occupation. The PCI was supporting at this time Eurocommunism and the historic compromise with the Christian Democrats.

=== Clash between the PCI and Autonomia ===
On 17 February 1977, Luciano Lama, secretary-general of the CGIL, the trade union closest to the PCI, gave a speech inside the occupied La Sapienza University. During the speech, the autonomi and the CGIL's security organization had a violent clash. This resulted in Lama being chased away. This confrontation prompted the expulsion of the students by the police.

The clash between the PCI and Autonomia reinforced the more radical current within Autonomia. The creative current, which included extravagant components, such as the Indiani Metropolitani movement, found itself in a minority. Some of the Autonomi decided that the time had come to alzare il livello dello scontro (escalate the conflict), in other words, to start using firearms.

== See also ==
- Movement of 1977
- Operaismo
- Years of lead (Italy)
