= Oreste Scalzone =

Italian Marxist intellectual and activist (born 1947)

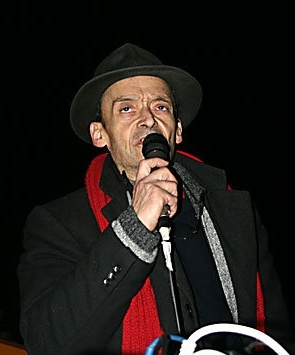
Oreste Scalzone

Oreste Scalzone (born 26 January 1947) is an Italian far-left activist and one of the founders of the communist organization Potere Operaio. During the years of lead period, he was one of the leaders of the autonomist movement.

== Life and activism ==
Scalzone was born in Terni, Umbria. In 1968, he came to know Franco Piperno, and on 1 March 1968, he took part in the clashes against Italian police at Valle Giulia. A few days later, his vertebral column was seriously injured by a desk thrown from a window by neo-fascist students, mostly belonging to the Italian Social Movement, that were occupying the faculty of Law of the Sapienza University of Rome. About the 1968 movement, he said: "What did we want? That everything changed ... that universities were to be collectively managed, that there was no selection, that the Vietcong won the war, that culture changed, but most importantly that this extraordinary movement, that changed our daily life, could stand up."

With Piperno and Toni Negri, Scalzone founded Potere Operaio in 1969. On 7 April 1979, he was arrested, along with Negri, Piperno, and other members of the autonomist movement, and accused of planning armed attacks and plotting to overthrow the government. In 1981, he managed to flee first to Denmark, then to Paris, where he remained protected from extradition thanks to the Mitterrand doctrine. Scalzone revealed that his escape was helped by actor and friend Gian Maria Volonté. In 1983, he was sentenced to 16 years' jail, reduced to nine in 1989. While in France, Scalzone worked for a political solution to the "Years of Lead" that could lead to an amnesty to political refugees and prisoners.

In 1998, Scalzone briefly and secretly came back to Italy, passing through Corsica; a photographic service by the newsmagazine L'Espresso later revealed the episode. In 2002, he went on hunger strike in protest against the extradition of Paolo Persichetti. A 17 January 2007 ruling of the Court of Milan declared his crimes ("subversive association and member of an armed organization") prescribed. He announced he had come back to Italy to "fight, under new conditions, an old battle".

== See also ==
- Autonomism
- Battle of Valle Giulia
- Primavalle Fire
