= Franco Piperno =

Italian physicist and communist militant (1943–2025)

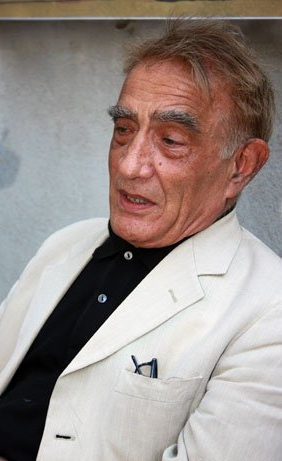
Piperno in 2008

Franco Piperno (5 January 1943 – 13 January 2025) was an Italian communist militant. He was an associate professor of Condensed Matter Physics in the University of Calabria.

== Life and career ==
Piperno was born in Catanzaro in a Jewish family. He graduated in physics at the University of Pisa and was member of the FGCI (Italy's communist youth organization). After his expulsion, in 1969 he was suspected of having sabotaged a Boston Chemical plant, which produced defoliant used in the Vietnam War, but he was immediately released. In Rome he was an activist in the 1968 movement and in the summer 1969 he took part in the demonstration against Fiat in Turin.

In the late 1969, with Oreste Scalzone and Toni Negri, he was one of the founders of the far-left organisation Potere Operaio, and later he was a member of Autonomia Operaia. He also led the wing of Potere Operaio called Lavoro Illegale ("Illegal Work").

With Negri, Scalzone, and others, he was charged with the publication of subversive magazines in 1979 but he escaped capture. In 1980 he was absolved, but one year later he was condemned to ten years of imprisonment in another trial for insurrectional activity and participation in the kidnapping and murder of Aldo Moro. In particular, he was accused of having acted as a negotiator (through one of the kidnappers, Valerio Morucci) between the Italian Socialist Party and the terrorists who were allegedly detaining Moro. Documents left by the journalist Mino Pecorelli after his murder also hinted at an involvement of Piperno in the kidnapping. Piperno then lived in exile for several years, first in France thanks to the Mitterrand doctrine and then in Canada, where he also obtained a position at the University of Montreal and then at the Faculte St. Jean at the University of Alberta in Edmonton. Most of the charges were later dropped, and the sentence was reduced to four years.

Piperno returned to Italy from Canada in 1990, and became active locally in his hometown, Cosenza, creating the cultural association Ciroma. In January 1996 his car was hit by four handgun bullets. In May 1996, Piperno became a member of the local council of the city of Cosenza.

Piperno died on 13 January 2025 in Cosenza, at the age of 82.

== See also ==
- Autonomism
- Primavalle Fire
- Kidnapping of Aldo Moro
