= Telekom Center Athens =

Sports facility in Athens, Greece

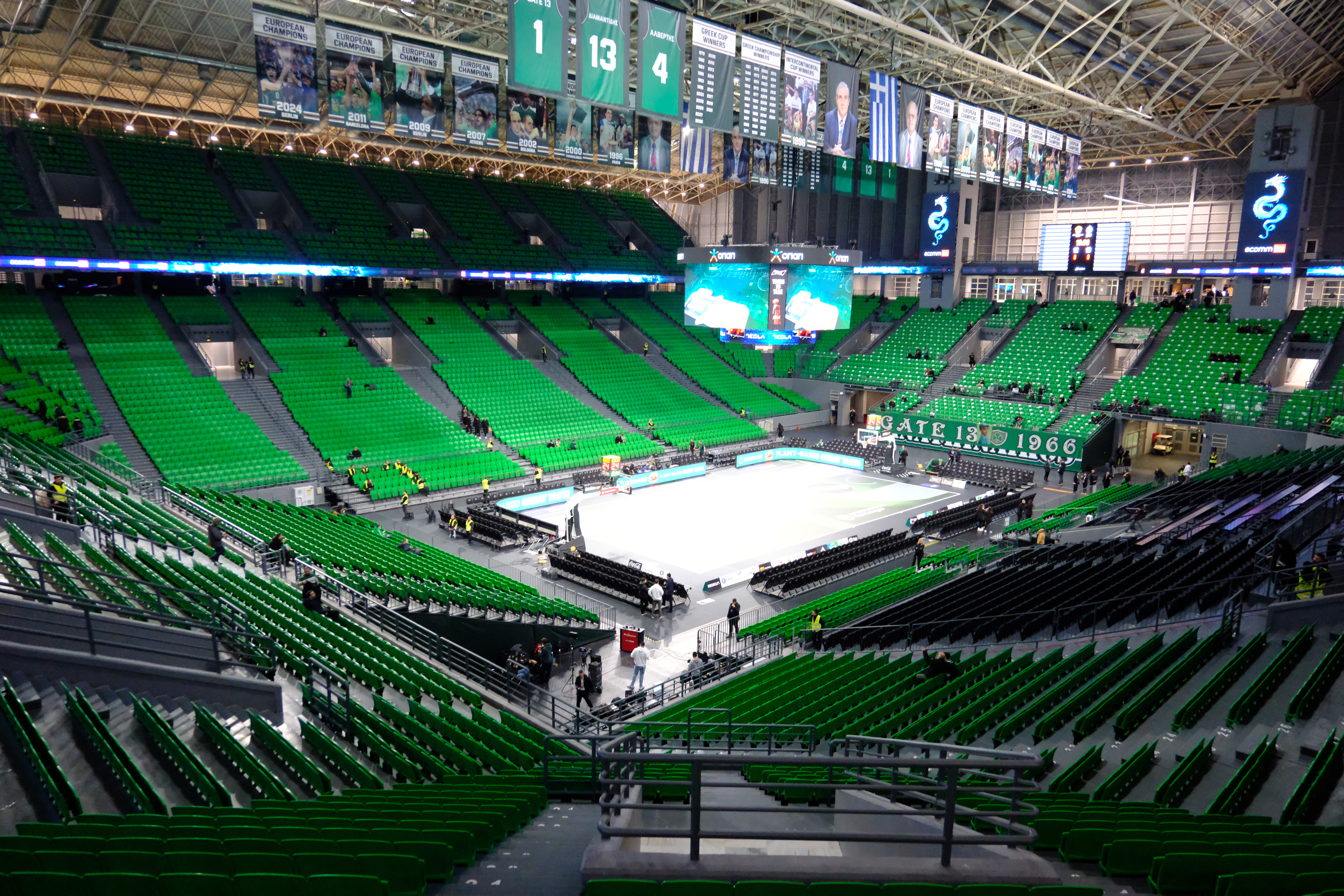
- Interactive map of Telekom Center Athens
- Location: Athens Olympic Sports Complex, Marousi, Athens, Greece
- Coordinates: 38.037862°N 23.784676°E
- Owner: Greek state
- Operator: Panathinaikos B.C.
- Capacity: 19,250
- Surface: Glass floor
- Record attendance: 19,443 (Greece vs Belgium, 28 August 2022)
- Public transit: Eirini

Construction
- Opened: 1995
- Renovated: 2002–2004 (Olympic Games); 2023–2026
- Cost: 15-18 million € for the current renovation
- Architects: Populous (2024 design feasibility study); Decathlon S.A. (current renovation lead architect)
- General contractor: Aktor Group S.A.

Tenants
- Greece men's national basketball team (1995–present); Panathinaikos B.C. (1995–present)

Website
- https://telekomcenterathens.gr

Telekom Center Athens, also dubbed T-Center Athens and previously known as OAKA Basketball Arena, is part of the Spyros Louis Olympic Athletic Center of Athens (Greek: O.A.K.A. «Σπύρος Λούης»). It was completed in 1994 and is the largest indoor venue in Greece. It was used for sporting events at the 2004 Summer Olympics. The venue is located in Marousi, a northern suburb of Athens. During its construction, it was considered to be one of the biggest and most modern indoor sports arenas in all of Europe.

The 19,250-capacity arena is accompanied by an adjacent training facility, and a parking lot.

In 2023, Panathinaikos B.C. signed an agreement with the Greek state for a 49-year concession of the asset, making the club the sole tenant and binding it to invest in the renovation of the asset's infrastructure. The club has since transferred the responsibility of managing the venue to White Veil S.A., a company which specializes in venue and facilities management, and is also owned by Dimitris Giannakopoulos.

In August 2025, a 5-year deal between White Veil S.A. and Telekom Greece (the greek subsidiary of Deutsche Telekom A.G.) was officially announced, for the rebranding of the entire venue as Telekom Center Athens.

== Construction ==
Exterior of building

The A-frame designed roof (2011)

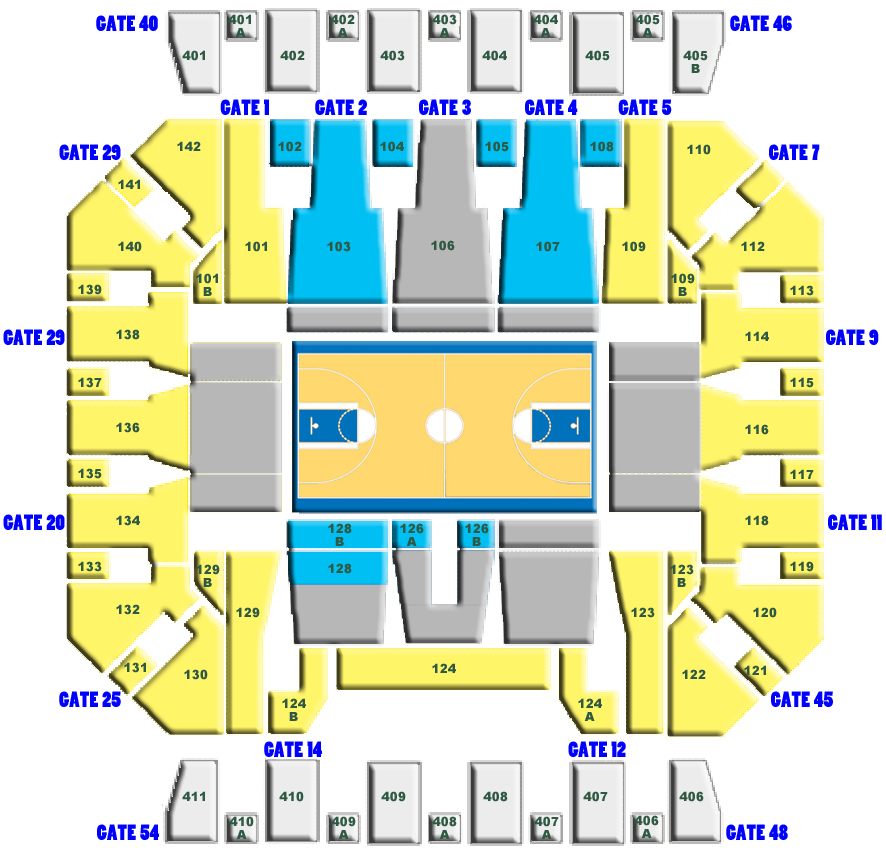
Indoor Hall plan

The Olympic Indoor Hall is notable for its distinctive A-frame roof that features four huge pillars, each of which is 35 meters tall, that stand 108 meters apart from each other. According to the Greek Ministry of Sports, it is the largest indoor sporting arena of its kind in the world. The arena is also constructed in a unique way so that an abundant amount of natural light comes into the arena during the day.

The arena seats up to 17,600 for gymnastics events, although only 12,500 seats were made publicly available for the gymnastics competition at the 2004 Olympics. It seats up to 19,443 for basketball games, which includes 300 seats for media members, and 189 seats for VIPs.

A large scale arena renovation was completed in 2004, for the 2004 Summer Olympics.

== 2004 Summer Olympics ==
The arena during the 2004 Summer Olympics.

The arena was used for artistic gymnastics and trampolining, and also hosted the finals of the basketball matches at the 2004 Summer Olympics. Renovation of the building for the Olympics was completed on 30 June 2004, and it was officially reopened on 10 August 2004, shortly before the beginning of the games.

== Basketball use ==
The Indoor Hall is the regular home court for the Greek Basket League professional basketball club Panathinaikos. It is also the primary home court of the senior Greek National Basketball Team.

The arena was used to host the quarterfinals, semifinals, and finals stages of the 1998 FIBA World Championship. It will host the group phase matches for the EuroBasket 2029.

=== EuroLeague Final Four ===
On 4 and 6 May 2007, the Indoor Hall hosted the EuroLeague 2006–07 season's Final Four, the semifinals and finals rounds of Europe's principal pro club competition in basketball, which saw hometown favourite Panathinaikos win the title.

The "OAKA" or newer name, Telecom Center Athens again hosted the EuroLeague 2025–26 season's Final Four on 22 and 24 May 2026, which saw Olympiacos, Panathinaikos's great rivals, who took the crown back winning against Real Madrid.

=== Olympic Qualifying Tournament ===
On 9 December 2007, FIBA announced that the Olympic Indoor Hall was selected as the host of the 2008 FIBA Olympic Qualifying Tournament for the 2008 Summer Olympic Games. At the qualifying tournament, hosts and favourites Greece, along with the German and Croatian national basketball teams, qualified for the final 2008 Olympic Basketball Tournament.

=== Basketball Champions League ===
The 2018 Basketball Champions League Final Four was held at OAKA Arena in Athens from May 4–6. Host team AEK Athens emerged victorious, defeating AS Monaco 100–94 in the final. This triumph secured AEK’s first BCL title and their third European trophy. Notably, exactly 50 years earlier, in 1968, AEK won the first-ever European title for any Greek team by defeating Slavia Prague in the same city, Athens, in front of 80,000 spectators at Panathenaic Stadium. The 2018 victory was a historic moment, celebrating half a century since that groundbreaking achievement in Greek basketball history.

The 2020 Basketball Champions League Final Four was held at OAKA Arena in Athens from September 30 to October 4, following a postponement due to the COVID-19 pandemic. San Pablo Burgos claimed their first BCL title, defeating AEK Athens 85–74 in the final. The event was played without fans due to health restrictions.

=== Panathinaikos B.C. ===
In 2023, Panathinaikos B.C. and the Greek government reached agreement for the exclusive use of the Athens gym for the next 49 years.

== Musical events ==
On 18 and 20 May 2006, the Hall hosted the 51st Eurovision Song Contest, that was held in Athens, after Greece's victory at the Song Contest in 2005. There were 15,000 seats available for spectators, both for the semifinal and the grand final.

Some of the entertainers who have performed at the arena include Bryan Adams, Maluma, Rotting Christ, Pearl Jam, Enrique Iglesias, Depeche Mode, Jennifer Lopez, Björk, Beyoncé, Slayer, Roger Waters, Aloha from Hell, Tokio Hotel, Helena Paparizou, Sakis Rouvas, Anna Vissi, Cigarettes After Sex and Florence and The Machine.

Since Panathinaikos became the sole tenant of the arena, musical events taking place increased significantly both inside and outside the stadium. Ejekt Festival is taking place in P5 Parking area of the arena.

=== List of concerts after the arena's concession to Panathinaikos ===
Date	Artist	Event	Attendance
5 December 2023	Bryan Adams	So Happy It Hurts Tour	7,000
16 February 2024	Toquel	360 Live Show	16,000
12 March 2024	André Rieu and his Johann Strauss Orchestra	—	30,000
13 March 2024	André Rieu and his Johann Strauss Orchestra	—	30,000
25 October 2024	Cigarettes After Sex	X's World Tour	30,000
26 October 2024	Cigarettes After Sex	X's World Tour	30,000
14 March 2025	André Rieu and his Johann Strauss Orchestra	—	30,000
15 March 2025	André Rieu and his Johann Strauss Orchestra	—	30,000
10 October 2025	Saske	Saskepticism Festival	15,000
13 December 2025	Rod Stewart	One Last Time Tour	14,000
14 December 2025	Big Time Rush	In Real Life Worldwide Tour	16,000
27 December 2025	Tyga	Tyga Live In Athens	15,000
17 January 2026	BetaPeis	23 years of BetaPeis	15,000
20 June 2026	Lex, Bloody Hawk, Rack, Dani Gambino, Snik, Light, Trannos, Sadam, Hatemost, Vlospa, Fly Lo, Strat, Ricta, Ivan Greko, Above The Hood, Moose, Mikros Kleftis, Hgemonas, Tsaki, Arab, Sidarta, Kidd, Hermes, XRS, Daima, Bres, Trouf, Mente Fuerte, Bossikan, Thug Slime, Diff, Donn, Dirty Harry, Yolte, LikeBoss, Ghetto Queen and Benzy	Flame Music Festival	32,000
21 June 2026	Lex, Bloody Hawk, Rack, Dani Gambino, Snik, Light, Trannos, Sadam, Hatemost, Vlospa, Fly Lo, Strat, Ricta, Ivan Greko, Above The Hood, Moose, Mikros Kleftis, Hgemonas, Tsaki, Arab, Sidarta, Kidd, Hermes, XRS, Daima, Bres, Trouf, Mente Fuerte, Bossikan, Thug Slime, Diff, Donn, Dirty Harry, Yolte, LikeBoss, Ghetto Queen and Benzy	Flame Music Festival	32,000
11 October 2026	ASAP Rocky	Don't Be Dumb Tour	—
13 October 2026	Deep Purple	Deep Purple Live	—
19 December 2026	Bryan Adams	Roll With the Punches Tour	—
12 March 2027	André Rieu and his Johann Strauss Orchestra	—	—

== Gallery ==
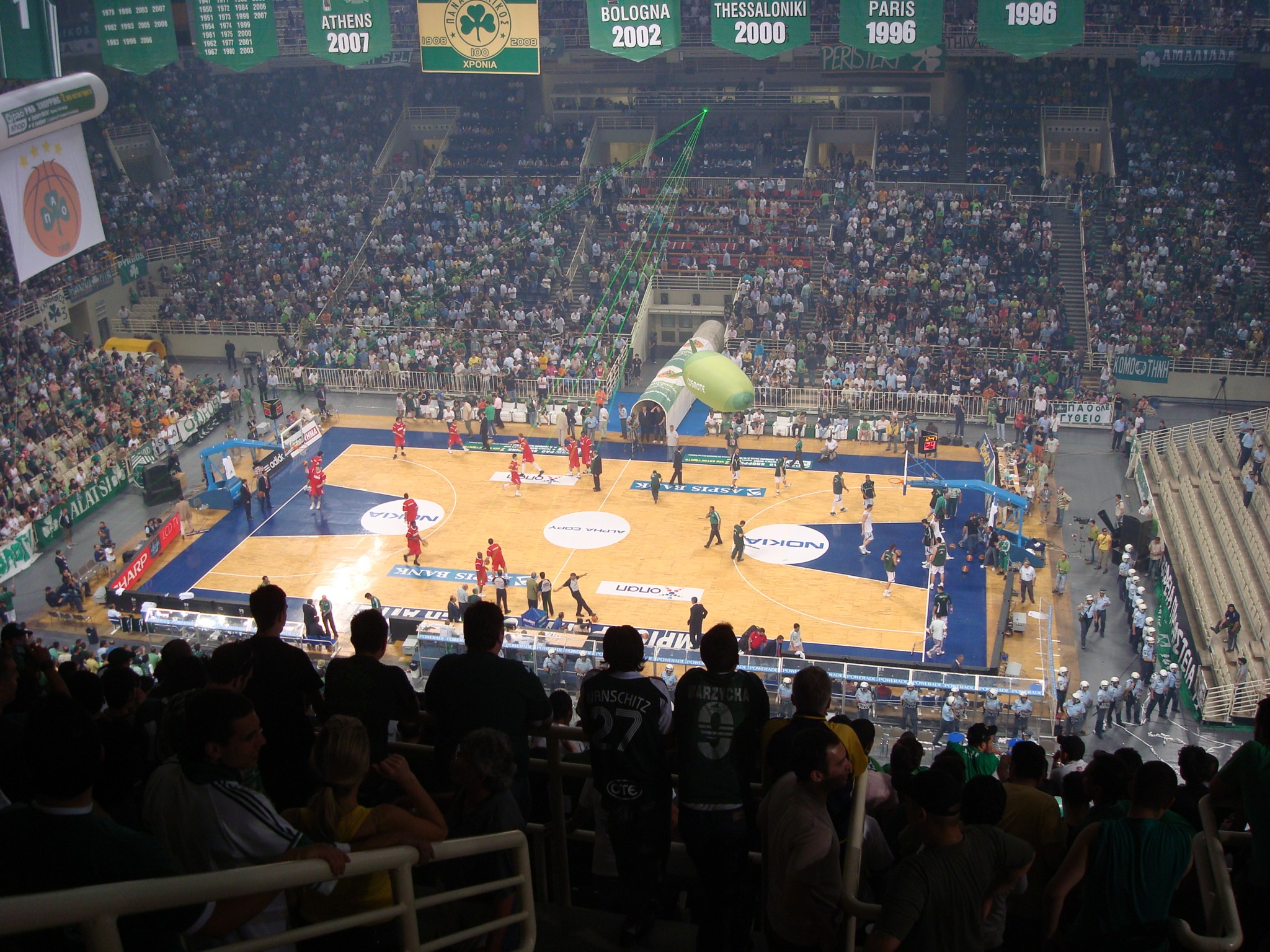

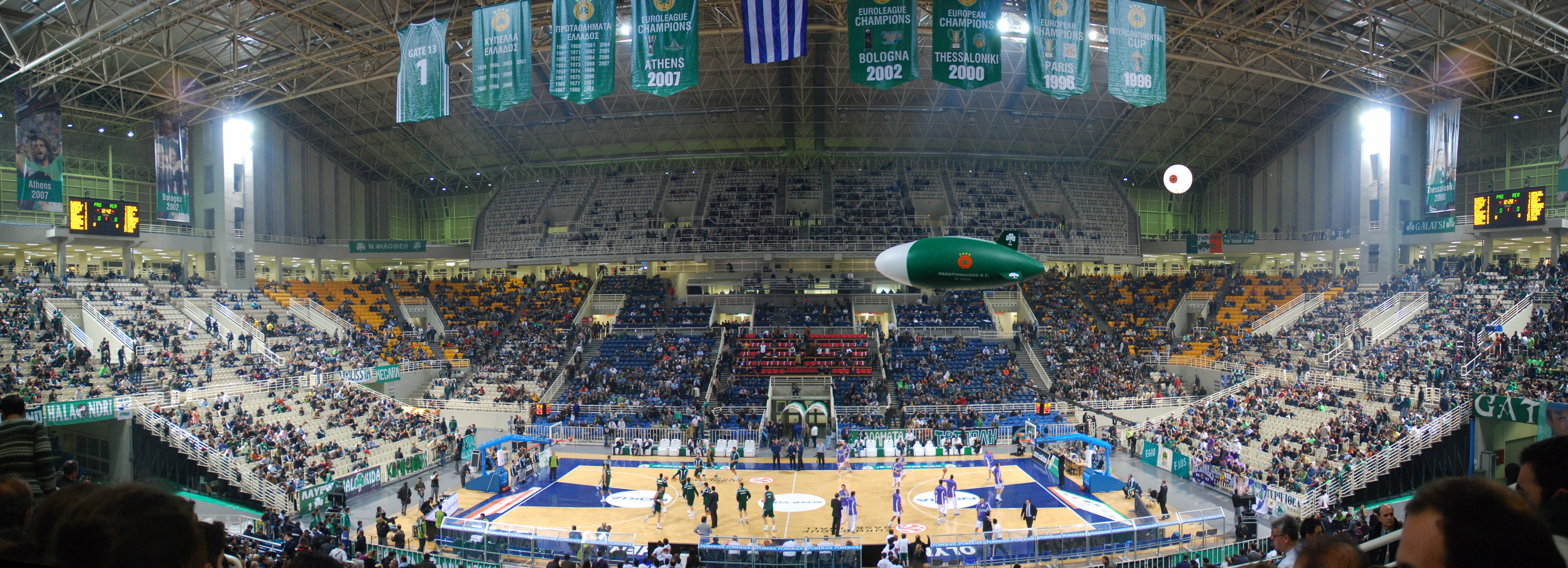

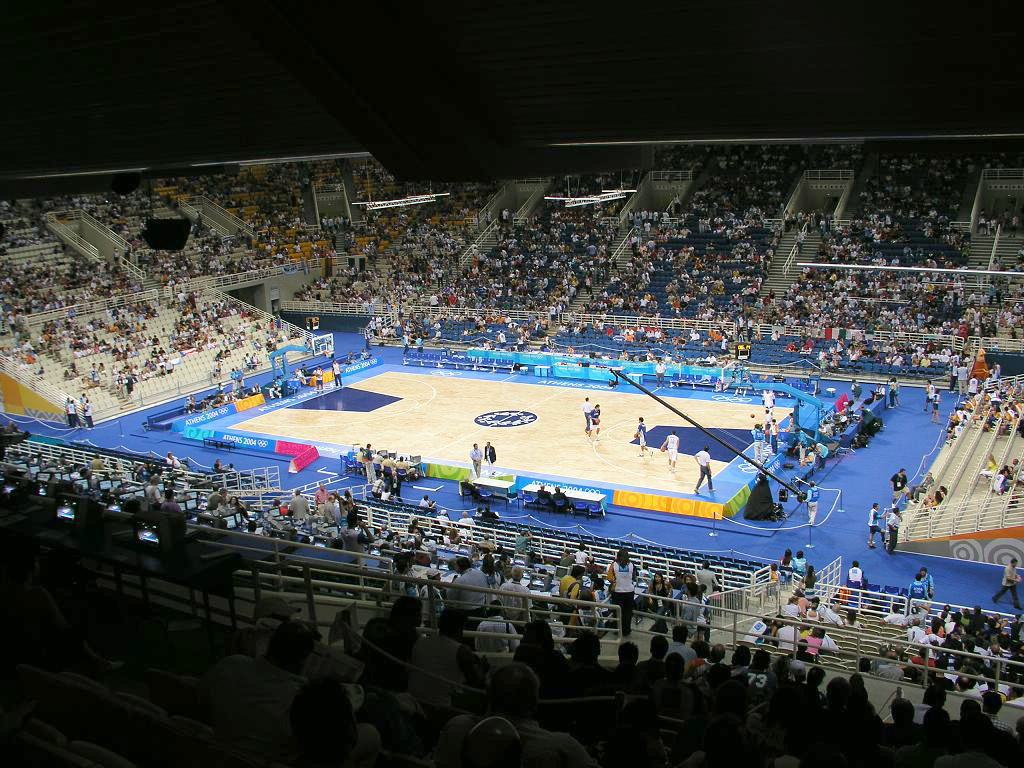

== See also ==
- List of basketball arenas by capacity
- List of indoor arenas in Greece
- List of indoor arenas in Europe

Events and tenants
Preceded by Olympiahalle; Munich	FIBA EuroBasket; Final Venue; 1995	Succeeded by Palau Sant Jordi; Barcelona
Preceded by Palatrussardi; Milan	FIBA Intercontinental Cup; Final Venue; 1996	Succeeded by Ginásio José Corrêa; Barueri, São Paulo
Preceded by SkyDome; Toronto	FIBA World Cup; Final Venue; 1998	Succeeded by Conseco Fieldhouse; Indianapolis
Preceded by Palace of Sports; Kyiv	Eurovision Song Contest; Venue; 2006	Succeeded by Hartwall Areena; Helsinki
Preceded by Sazka Arena; Prague	EuroLeague; Final Four; Venue; 2007	Succeeded by Palacio de Deportes; Madrid
Preceded by Santiago Martín; La Laguna	FIBA Champions League; Final Four; Venue; 2018	Succeeded by Sportpaleis; Antwerp
Preceded by Fernando Buesa Arena; Vitoria-Gasteiz	EuroLeague; Final Four; Venue; 2020	Succeeded by TBD
