= Social Waste =

Greek hip-hop and low bap band

- Born: Heraklion
- Genres: Low bap
- Years active: 1999-today
- Members: Leonidas (Lyrics/MC); Giannis (production/MC); Christos (Lyrics/MC/production); Aniatos (Lyrics/MC/production); Parias (Lyrics/MC/production); Polytropos (MC)
- Website: https://socialwaste.org/

Social Waste is a Greek hip-hop/low bap band formed in 1999 in Heraklion, Crete. The band covers broad subject with, political lyrics referring to historical people such as Aris Velouchiotis, Chronis Missios and other, commenting on many other societal and political subjects . Members of the band have themselves stated that they identify with anti-authoritarianism. Saying that their music stems support from activism themselves encouraging such actions and/or protests. An example of this may be their participating in a concert about the Case of Irianna V.L. or another example of this may have been the song they wrote about the protests in Chalkidiki.

== History ==
Taking their first steps in collaboration with Active Member, along with that band they are a part of B.D. Foxmoor, the «Freestyle Productions», where they also collaborated with late Pavlos Fyssas. Leaving Freestyle Productions in 2004, being absent until rejoining in 2013.

== Discography ==
- Rebelde, 2025.
- Synora, 2020.
- Το Hip Hop tis Mesogeiou, 2017.
- Me mia Piratiki Galera, 2015.
- Sti Giorti tis Outopias, 2013.

== Relation to literature ==
Their opinions on football were mentioned in a book about the left-wing, politics and football along with the ones of Alexis Tsipras.

The creation of their song "Megara" was turned into a comic.
