= Sadahzinia =

- Born: Yolanda Tsiampokalou; 1977 (age 48–49)
- Genres: Hip hop, low bap
- Occupations: Musician, Hip Hop/Low Bap Singer, Writer
- Instrument: Vocals
- Years active: 1994–present
- Labels: Warner, 8ctagon, Imantas
- Formerly of: Active Member

Yolanda Tsiambokalou (born 1977), better known as Sadahzinia, is a Greek rapper and a former member of the hip hop/low bap group Active Member. She is widely considered the first woman to enter the Greek hip-hop scene. In addition to her musical career, she also writes children's fairy tales.

== Early years ==
Sadahzinia was born and raised in Byron, Athens. Since 1999, she has held a degree in English Literature from the Philosophical School of Athens. The nickname Sadahzinia is derived from the words "sad" (in English), "(j)ah" (create in Jamaican), and "zinia", referring to the zinnia flower. The combination of these words creates a pun based on a Caribbean legend, which suggests that the zinnia is initially a sad flower, but when it hears music, it blooms, and life changes forever.

== Career ==
=== As a musician ===
Since 1994, Sadahzinia has been a member of the Freestyle Productions production group of Active Member, marking the beginning of her active engagement with hip-hop music. Her first recording participation occurred shortly thereafter, contributing to a song ("Like Tears") on Active Member's album "The Big Trick." In the subsequent years, she continued to participate in other Freestyle Productions releases, including Active Member's next album "From the Place of Flight" and Babylon's debut album, "Beginning to End." In 1998, she released her first personal album, "Another One."

Two more personal works, "Silver Edge" and "In the Color of Ash" from Warner, followed. In April 2003, she co-founded the independent label 8ctagon with B.D. Foxmoor. The label also released her fourth personal album, "The Noise and the Noises." In 2004, alongside DJ Booker, she officially became a member of Active Member, having previously participated in all the records and live performances. Their first release as a band was the album "Fiera." Subsequent releases included "Blah-Blasphemy" in 2005, and in April 2006, her fifth studio album, "Petranasa," was released.

On December 4, Active Member unveiled their new release, "Skieratsa," a collector's boxset containing three new albums: "Blah-Blasphemy 2," "Vathyskiota," and "Apnoia." Notably, DJ Booker was absent from the band lineup on this release, and the band now consists of B.D. Foxmoor and Sadahzinia.

=== As a writer ===
Since 2000, she has been writing articles for the magazines Onirologio and Praxia. She edited B.D. Foxmoor's book of verses from 1993 to 2000, along with anecdotal photos titled "Charge 'em on Fire." In November 2001, Kastaniotis publications released her fairy tale "The Beautiful Queen - A Cinderella from Russia," followed by her fairy tale "Mr. Alfalfa" a year later. For the latter, she organized a series of events in various venues, including bookstores and schools, where she presented an original play she had written.

She has also translated several works from English, including Crockett Johnson's award-winning series of children's books ("Harry and the Purple Marker," "Harry's Circus," "Harry's Journey to Heaven"), Nicola Baxter's "Around the World in 80 Fairy Tales," Geraldine McCaughrean's "Not the End of the World" (which won the Whitbread Award for children's fiction in 2004), and Joe Sacco's comic book "Palestine" (published by KΨM, Athens 2006).

In the summer of 2003, she presented her play "O Magos tis Fotias" (Fire's wizzard) at the Petras Theatre, accompanied by a live symphony orchestra and a DJ (with Gerasimos Gennatas as the narrator). The same year, this work was published in a book with illustrations by Stathis.

Among her other fairy tales are "Dirigou - Diribai" (which has also been translated into Albanian), "If You Paint the Hare as Red as an Egg," "If You Treat a Fluffy Cat to Ice Cream," and "If You Give Santa a Red Shell."
