= Greek hip-hop =

Music genre

Greek hip hop (Greek: Ελληνικό χιπ χοπ, pronounced [eliniˈko hip hop]), is a music genre, also known as the music of the streets derived from the American hip hop culture. There are many sub-genres many times interacting with other types of greek music such as Éntekhno, with many artists of either genres collaborating.

Just as in the US, hip hop is divided into four basic characteristics: DJing (disc jockey), which has advanced greatly recently due to the development of technology. The second one is MCing (master of ceremony), where the people involved in it are called MCs or rappers. The third one is Graffiti, also recently, considering it being an art, graffiti has become a sort of a grey area legally with police many times turning a blind eye to it with events being organised frequently with graffiti at their focus. The fourth and last one is breakdancing.

== History ==
=== The late 80s toward the 90s: the first generation – the beginnings ===
The first time Rap and/or Hip Hop was heard in Greece was in the 70s by the broadcasts of the US military base. In the early 80s concepts such as Graffiti and Break Dance came to Greece, setting up the base of Greek hip hop.

The earliest indications of the localized genre date back to 1987 the Maxi-single Deejays's with the group FF.C, though native language albums did not appear until the mid-1990s. The first hip hop album was Diamartiria (protest) in 1993 of Active Member along with "Σκληροί καιροί" (Hard Times) by FF.C. Both albums released under the independent label "Freestyle Productions". Though many can argue that the album Modern Fears "Η Αναμέτρηση" (circa 1992) by Aris Thomas was the first hip hop influenced record in Greece. Then Razastarr followed with their unreleased demo on Freestyle Productions, and TXC with their single Terror X Crew in 1995. Also, in 1987 rapper Aris Tomas came to the scene, although he became more aligned with the dance and disco scene. The first Greek hip-hop album was released in 1990 called En+Taxei (from the Greek "Εντάξει" meaning Okay) the album was released by O.P.A. (Oppressive People Group). One of the first hip-hop groups was also Stereo Nova, their first album the same name came out in 1992.

The same year in a Public Enemy concert in Nikaia, the low-bap group Active Member was created. A few years later they founded Freestyle Productions in which participated both the late Pavlos Fyssas (Killah P) and Social Waste, with the hopes of differentiating themselves from the rest of Greek hip-hop who started to look a lot alike with its American counterpart. This led to a split between the two scenes, which led to a lot of criticism towards Active Member by many groups even later on such as RNS in 2018.

n 1993 the album R.E.A.L (Rap Elevate Above Law) was released by many of the bands participating in freestyle productions (Active Member, Drama N' Vinyl, Real D, Loyal T, Maffic)

In 1994 ΝΕΒΜΑ were created, a hip hop band with social problems. The same time Goin' Through who became a fundamental part of the scene. In the end of the same year begun circulation of the magazine "radicalistic" by freestyle productions. At the same time Active Member released their second album "Stin ora ton Skion" (στην ώρα των σκιών). In 1996Imiskoumpria made their debut in the scene them being the first clearly satirical band in the hip-hop scene.

=== Late 90s – The new Millennium: The Second Generation – The Golden Era ===
Gangsta rap came to Greece in 1997 with the group Zontanoi Nekroi (Ζωντανοί Νεκροί; Living Dead). In 1999 the group Paremvoles (Παρεμβολές) released the first hardcore CD named En Opsi (Εν όψει; In consideration of).

Their first album named "ΖΝ: Εντολές / Στη Χώρα των Καλύτερων MC’s" (ZN: Entoles / Sti Hora on Kalyteron MC's") (1997) then O Protos Tomos (Ο Πρώτος Τόμος) (1998) These have been characterised as the greatest hits of Greek hip-hop being founding parts of battle rap. Almost all rap in Greece today traces itself to ZN.

In 2000 the group Alfa Gama (Άλφα Γάμα [Α.Γ.]) continued with the CD named Agnostofovia (Αγνωστοφοβία; Fear of the unknown). Imiskoumbria and Goin' Through made Greek hip-hop famous in the mainstream Greek audience. Goin' Through changed their way of music from hip hop to a kind of R&B or Pop music.

The lyrics then were largely political but there were still some satirical bands: Vavilona, La Klikaria, Dr. Dreez, Deaky Dee.

==== New bands and dissolution of old ones ====
In the early 2000s many old bands of the '90s dissolved or changed form: Terror X Crew dissolved in 2002 after DJ ALX left. FF.C dissolved in 2005. While Active Member splintered after X-Ray left and created Ρόδες. Razastarr dissolved in 2017 with their album "Afou Skotoso ti Dipsa Mou" (Αφού Σκοτώσω Τη Δίψα Μου).

From 2001 onwards new bands were established. which's releases were largely digital, free and without corporate interference, leading to a plethora of new releases. Many bands were created but they largely didn't lead long lasting careers. Some bands of the Second Generation adapted and continued for some time, like VitaPeis, τα Voreia Asteria, G.I.ANT.S, Bong Da City, Flowjob, United Crew, RNS (RolleNStoned squad) Yonka Mayonka.

Many of the artists participating in the aforementioned bands came to lead Solo careers even after the bands' dissolutions. Many Voreia Asteria members such as Tzamal and Mikros Kleftis continued their careers beyond the 2010s and into the later eras of rap. Most famously Lex came to lead a much more famous career. Also, other rappers such as Tsaki who participated in both Bong Da City and still participates in Yonka Mayonka.

==== Mainstream scene ====
In the 2000s hip-hop became so well known that it began to develop a commercial character. With Imiskoubria singer saying himself: "We were never marginalised musicians[...]".

This commercialization had started already by the 90's with Imiskoubria's humorous attitude which can be shown in the 2001 single "Pame oli mazi se mia paralia" (Πάμε όλοι μαζί σε μια παραλία) which became a massive success. The singles "Greek Lover" and "Sex" had similar success released in 2004. The same year Goin' Through saw great success with the single "Poso malakas eisai" (Πόσο μαλάκας είσαι). Until 2007 Goin' Through and Family the Label were the most successful and well-recognised hip-hop label in Greece.

In 2007 more artists came up in the Hip-Hop scene with more successes such as Stavento who became famous through the radio hit "Mesa sou" (Μέσα σου), Ypo or Ypohthonios (ZN member) with the success "Kane ntou" (Κάνε ντου).

==== Underground scene ====
The difference between underground and commercial Hip-Hop was visible. Consdidering underground hip-hop has much more hardcore lyrics and was promoted through HipHop.Gr, and radio station Atlantis FM while commercial hip-hop was promoted through large music vendors. In the duration of the 2000s came up many new artists and also many older artists came back to the surface such as: 12os Pithikos, Αnser, Iratus,Tiny jackal, Lex and Tzamal (Former members of Voreia Asteria), Logos Apeili, Sadomas, Rapsodos Filologos, Vevilos(Member of Vavilona), Social Waste, Fi Vita Sigma (FVS) among others.

=== Early 2010s: third generation – the crisis ===
During the new decade and onwards the internet gave a further rise in popularity to rap. At the same time, a large part of the audience, it being mostly teens or pre-teens, abandoned other forms of Greek music dedicating themselves to rap. Considering rappers were now expressing emotions through rap and their everyday life, this way being more relatable but also more political.

New crews who came to the new greek Hip Hop scene are Logos Timis, Joker/Two-Face and Fi Vita Sigma. The latter two bands were made by members of Bong Da City, who after the "Purple n' Blue" mixtape of 2011, their last album, went either solo, or with other bands.

The new generation of rap has contributed to the Boom bap genre, with new groups forming regularly such as Bloody Hawk, Mr.YO, Hawk, Logos Timis, Skiahtro, Katholou Crew, Rammenos Assos, Novel 729, Ethismos, Zafko, Los Hermano, Expend Flow, Zoro&Buzz, Lobo, Fer De Lance, Obnoxious Kas, Poetic, Tropeau Roman, among others.
