= Rockwave Festival =

Rock music festival in Malakasa, Greece

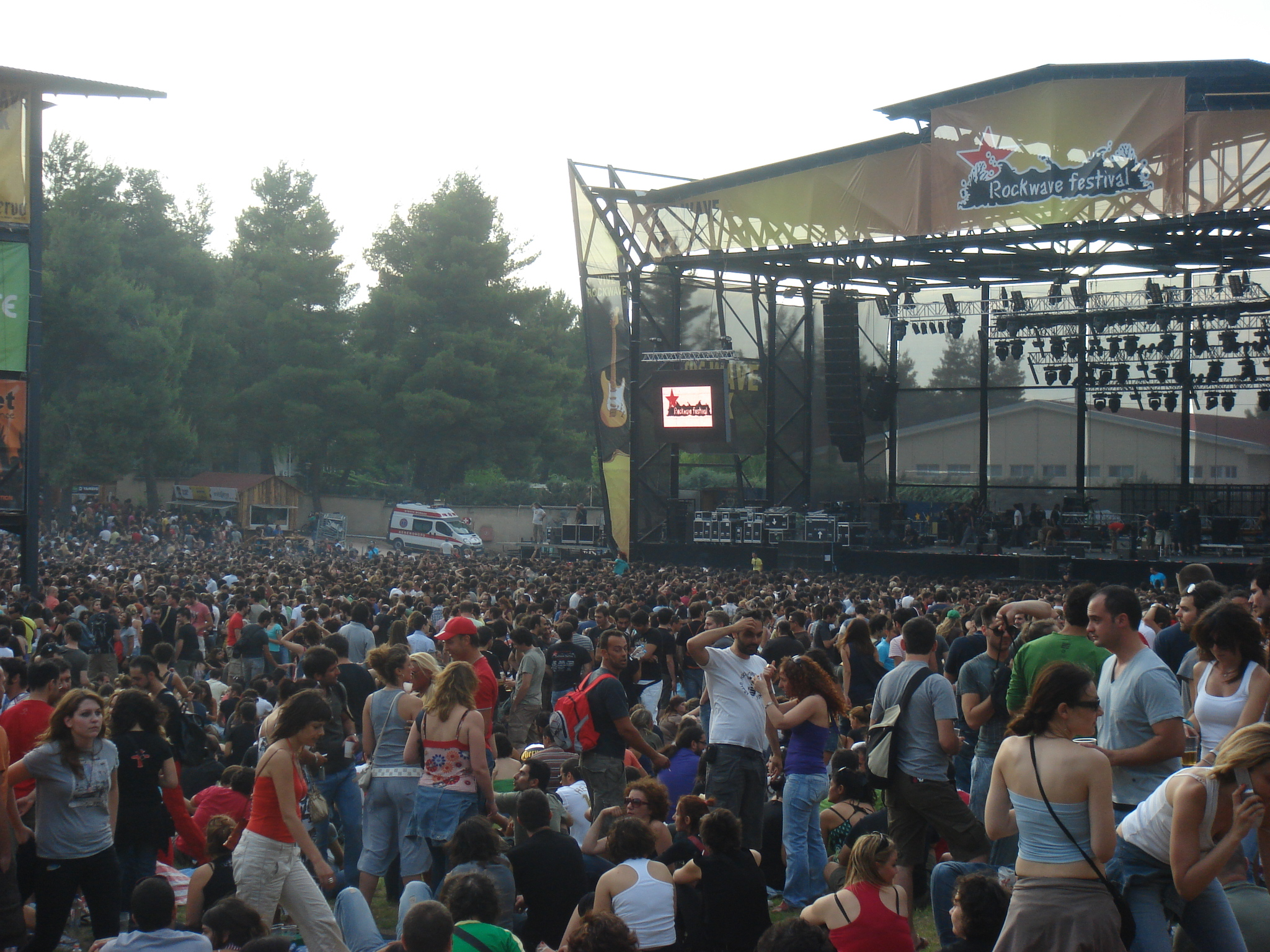
- Terra Stage, Rockwave Festival, 2009
- Genre: Alternative rock, rock, metal, pop
- Dates: June–July
- Locations: TerraVibe Park, Malakasa, Greece
- Years active: 1996–2001, 2004-2018, 2022-
- Website: www.rockwavefestival.gr

Rockwave Festival is a rock festival that takes place in Malakasa, Greece, near Athens. It is one of the most famous music festivals in Greece. The festival's history begins in 1996, but its popularity has spread since 2004. The festival's location was constantly being changed until 2004, when event park TerraVibe Park, located in Attica, became the permanent venue of the festival.

== 2026 lineup ==
Terra Stage
Saturday 20 June

Kneecap
Fundracar
Twinsanity

== 2025 lineup ==
This year marked the addition of a sister festival in Pieria, at Terra Republic.

Terra Vibe
| Saturday 14 June | Thurday 10 July | Friday 11 July | Sunday 13 July | Monday 14 July |
| Dionysis Savvopoulos | King Diamond; Paradise Lost; Null O' Zero; Typhus; Corrupted Symmetry | Alice Cooper; Floor Jansen; Zeal & Ardor; Sebia; Foivos | Cypress Hill; Kneecap; Jaul x Stolen Mic; Lobo; Fighting Flies | W.A.S.P. Skyclad; Anorimoi; Achelous; Korona Grammata |

Terra Republic
| Saturday 21 June | Thursday 26 June | Friday 27 June | Saturday 28 June |
| Dionysis Savvopoulos | Opeth; The Halo Effect; Iotunn; Longshots; Venus Effect | Rotting Christ; Sacred Reich; Primordial; Hail Spirit Noir; Neperia | Savatage; Michael Schenker; Need; Leatherhead; Sirius |

== 2023 lineup ==
Asking Alexandria were to play on the second day but did not perform due to health issues of their drummer.

Terra Stage
| Saturday 1 July | Friday 7 July | Saturday 8 July | Sunday 9 July |
| Robbie Williams; James Bay; Mika; Jonathan Jeremiah; Leon of Athens | Deep Purple; Saxon; As I Lay Dying; Bokassa; Rock n' Roll Children; Lazy Man's Load | The Black Keys; Puscifer; Ville Valo; Kishi Bashi; Spektrvm; Frenzee | Villagers of Ioannina City; 1000mods Mother of Millions; Sadhus; Project Renegade; Soundtruck; Ganzi Gun |

== 2022 lineup ==
Terra Stage
Friday 22 July

Social Distortion
Amenra
Allochiria
Krotalias
Half Gramme of Soma

== 2018 lineup ==
Terra Stage
| Friday 6 July | Thursday 19 July | Friday 20 July |
| Arctic Monkeys alt-J; Miles Kane; Get Well Soon; Coretheband | Judas Priest; Saxon; Accept | Iron Maiden; Tremonti; Monument |

Vibe Stage
| Friday 6 July | Thursday 19 July | Friday 20 July |
| | Sabaton; Foray Between Ocean; Null'O'Zero; Jacks Full | Volbeat; The Raven Age; W.E.B. Rollin' Dice |

== 2017 lineup ==
Terra Stage
| Friday 30 June | Saturday 1 July | Sunday 2 July |
| Rotting Christ; Nightstalker; InnerWish | Placebo; Sivert Hoyem; Fat White Family; The Last International Playboys | Evanescence; Paradise Lost; Anathema; Epica |

Vibe Stage
| Friday 30 June | Saturday 1 July | Sunday 2 July |
| 1000mods Bazooka; Godsleep | Cigarettes After Sex; Tango with Lions; She Tames Chaos; Amnesia Pills | Gojira; Flogging Molly; Poem; Tardive Dyskinesia |

== 2016 lineup ==
Terra Stage
| Sunday 5 June | Tuesday 19 July |
| The Last Shadow Puppets; Suede; The Subways; The Callas; Whereswilder | Lana Del Rey; Allah-Las; Iratus; Daphne and the Fuzz; The Cave Children |

Vibe Stage
| Sunday 5 June | Tuesday 19 July |
| Dropkick Murphys; Turbonegro; Despite Everything; Wish Upon a Star | |

== 2015 lineup ==
Terra Stage
| Saturday 30 May | Saturday 20 June | Saturday 4 July | Tuesday 21 July |
| The Black Keys; The Black Angels; 1000mods The Big Nose Attack; Puta Volcano | Robbie Williams; Kovacs; Ex-Girlfriend's Perfume; Inconsistencies | The Prodigy; Black Rebel Motorcycle Club; John Garcia; Electric Litany | Manu Chao; Baildsa; Fundracar; Les Skartoi; DJ Spery |

Vibe Stage
| Saturday 30 May | Saturday 20 June | Saturday 4 July | Tuesday 21 July |
| | | Judas Priest; Rotting Christ; Maplerun; Exarsis | |

== 2014 lineup ==
Terra Stage
| Friday 11 July | Saturday 12 July |
| Active Member; Razastarr; Rodney P & DJ Skitz; Nikitas Klint & Fleck; Vavylona; Taf Lathos; Noova Groova; Ground Zero; Stixoplokes; Normatraxx Sound System | Giannis Haroulis; Natassa Bofiliou; Greeklish Babylon; Chinese Basement |

Vibe Stage
| Friday 11 July | Saturday 12 July |
| Timo Maas; Roni Size & Youngman MC; Eric Burdon; The Godfathers; Villagers of Ioannina City; Beggars Blues Diary | Booka Shade; Woodkid; Calexico; Little Barrie |

== 2013 lineup ==
Terra Stage
| Saturday 6 July | Sunday 7 July | Monday 8 July | Tuesday 9 July |
| Sokratis Malamas; Thanasis Papakonstantinou; Leonidas Mpalafas | Ska-P; Marky Ramone; Alborosie; 1000mods | Lana Del Rey; Echo & the Bunnymen; The Subways; Gautier | Dead Can Dance; Monophonics; Craig Walker; Opera Chaotique |

Vibe Stage
| Saturday 6 July | Sunday 7 July | Monday 8 July | Tuesday 9 July |
| Giannis Aggelakas; Ypogeia Revmata & Thanos Anestopoulos; Eirini Skulakaki | Saxon; Kreator; Carcass; Descending; Endsight | Iced Earth; Suicidal Tendencies; At the Gates; Psycho Choke; Black Hat Bones | Septic Flesh; Chaostar; Acid Death; Tardive Dyskinesia; Mahakala |

== 2012 lineup ==
| Saturday 30 June | Sunday 1 July | Monday 2 July |
|---|---|---|
| The Locos; The Last Drive; Nashville Pussy; Nightstalker; Mamma Kin | Ozzy Osbourne; Machine Head; Paradise Lost; Unisonic; Planet of Zeus; Lucky Funeral | The Prodigy; Iggy and the Stooges; Everlast; GAD. Monovine |

== 2011 lineup ==
Terra Stage
| Friday 1 July | Saturday 2 July | Sunday 3 July |
| Editors; Cake; The Stranglers; The Inspector Cluzo | Giannis Aggelakas; Psarantonis; Lykoi Live; Psarogiorgis; Ntinos Sadikis; Lozios & Anakatosia; Lost Bodies; Vlastur; Polifoniko Schima Dioni | The Prodigy; Gogol Bordello; Kyuss Lives! Monster Magnet; Marky Ramone's Blitzkrieg |

Vibe Stage
| Friday 1 July | Saturday 2 July | Sunday 3 July |
| Sivert Hoyem; Pavlos Pavlidis & B-Movies; Vassilikos; Stavros Dadoush & Los Tigainos; Iosif Vagger dj set Go Over | | Flogging Molly; Therapy? Viza; Dept. 63High |

== 2010 lineup ==
Terra Stage
| Wednesday 7 July | Saturday 10 July | Sunday 11 July |
| The Black Eyed Peas; Faithless; Aviv Geffen; Konstantinos Vita; Transistor | Fatboy Slim; The Ting Tings; White Lies; Melisses | Ska-P; Massive Attack; Peyoti for President |

Vibe Stage
| Friday 1 July | Saturday 2 July | Sunday 3 July |
| | DJ Shadow; Garcia plays Kyuss; Dear Darkstar | Gogol Bordello; Giannis Aggelakas; Ska Bangies |

== 2009 lineup ==
Terra Stage
| Saturday 27 June | Sunday 28 June | Monday 29 June | Tuesday 30 June |
| Placebo; Moby; Gogol Bordello; Aviv Geffen; Cabaret Balcan | The Killers; Duffy; Dinosaur Jr; K. BETTA; GAD | Mötley Crüe; Monster Magnet; Arch Enemy; Lauren Harris | Slipknot; Mastodon; Down; Kylesa; Torche |

Vibe Stage
| Saturday 27 June | Sunday 28 June | Monday 29 June | Tuesday 30 June |
| Foals; Expatriate; Sunny Side of the Razor; Raintear | Tricky; Eden James; De Niro; Jamerllada | W.A.S.P. Voivod; Inactive Messiah; Scar Of The Sun | Saxon; Lita Ford; Eden Demise; God.Fear.None |

== 2008 lineup ==
Monday 31 March was the day when Didi Music-Big Star Promotion Ltd (music concert organizer), announced the names of the artists that would perform at Rockwave Festival 2008. Along with the names they introduced the changes in the festival's whole structure. The festival is now divided in two stages, "Terra" stage and "Vibe" stage (that comes by the name of the event park "TerraVibe"). They also abolished the division of the "Terra" concert area into gates PL1 and PL2, lowered the high price of the tickets and retained the special area that is on the side of the field, where there is more comfort, as there are places to sit.

Terra Stage
| Tuesday 8 July | Wednesday 9 July | Thursday 10 July |
| The Offspring; Siouxsie Sioux; Deus; The Gossip; Abbie Gale | Judas Priest; Within Temptation; Cavalera Conspiracy; Opeth; Morbid Angel | Manu Chao & the Radio Bemba Sound System; Patti Smith; Locomondo |

Vibe Stage
| Tuesday 8 July | Wednesday 9 July | Thursday 10 July |
| Marky Ramone; Flogging Molly; Personality Crisis; Viper Vikings; Pshychograndmamas | Carcass; Innerwish; Insidead; Universe217 | Los Mujeros; Rosebleed; No Profile; Looming Titties; Ska Bangies; Sober; Musica Ficta |

== 2007 lineup ==
When the band names were first announced, Stone Sour were included in the third day of the festival. Although the band cancelled a few of their dates in their European tour, My Dying Bride filled up their spot in the third day.

| Friday 29 June | Sunday 1 July | Tuesday 3 July |
|---|---|---|
| Robert Plant & The Strange Sensation; Chris Cornell; Europe; Redrum | Heaven and Hell; Dream Theater; Iced Earth; Anathema; Kinetic | Metallica; Mastodon; My Dying Bride; Dirt Spawn Disease |

== 2006 lineup ==
W.A.S.P. were to play on the third day but did not perform due to health issues of Blackie Lawless.

| Monday 10 July | Tuesday 11 July | Wednesday 12 July |
|---|---|---|
| Guns N' Roses; Star Star | Franz Ferdinand; The Dandy Warhols; Editors; Green on Red; Mecano; The Sunday Drivers | Twisted Sister; Celtic Frost; Crimson Glory; Moonspell |

== 2005 lineup ==
| Friday 24 June | Saturday 25 June | Sunday 26 June | Friday 8 July | Saturday 9 July |
|---|---|---|---|---|
| Marilyn Manson; Garbage; Matisse | Black Sabbath; Velvet Revolver; Black Label Society; Wastefall | Moby; Sonic Youth; Secret Machines; British Sea Power; Sigmatropic | Slayer; Accept; Candlemass; Dismember; Order of the Ebon Hand | Twisted Sister; Dio; Anthrax; Katatonia; Olethrio Rigma |

== 2004 lineup ==
Running Wild did not perform and were replaced by Gamma Ray. Muse were also to perform on the fourth day of the festival but cancelled and were replaced by Mogwai.

| Friday 18 June | Saturday 19 June | Sunday 20 June | Monday 21 June | Tuesday 22 June |
|---|---|---|---|---|
| Peter Gabriel; Estoudiantina Neas Ionias | W.A.S.P. Gamma Ray; Soulfly; Dark Tranquility; Firewind | Judas Priest; Nightwish; Queensrÿche; Nightfall | Pixies; Mogwai; Black Rebel Motorcycle Club; Ill Niño; Raining Pleasure | Placebo; HIM; Starsailor; The Soundtrack of Our Lives; Film |

== 2001 lineup ==
The festival took place in the Athens Olympic Velodrome (Athens Olympic Sports Complex) from 1 to 3 July.
The second day of the festival was cancelled by the Greek authorities, due to reasons of safety.

| Sunday 1 July | Tuesday 3 July |
|---|---|
| Judas Priest; Megadeth; Cradle of Filth; Savatage; Rotting Christ; Less Than Human | Placebo; PJ Harvey; Grandaddy; JJ72; Ash |

== 2000 lineup ==
The festival took place in Antonis Tritsis Metropolitan Park in Ilion, Athens.
Iron Maiden cancelled their show at the third day, due to Janick Gers' accident at a previous show.
The Flaming Lips also cancelled their show on the first day.

| Wednesday 12 July | Thursday 13 July | Friday 14 July |
|---|---|---|
| Oasis; Moby; Muse; Closer | Trypes; Supergrass; Apollo 440; Gomez; Gallon Drunk | Dream Theater; In Flames; Septic Flesh; On Thorns I Lay |

== 1999 lineup ==
The festival took place in Agios Kosmas, Athens.

| Monday 12 July | Tuesday 13 July | Wednesday 14 July | Thursday 15 July |
|---|---|---|---|
| Manowar; Mercyful Fate; Sodom; Immortal; Nightfall; Exhumation; Horrified | Blur; Placebo; Deus; Mercury Rev; Purple Overdose; Oneiropagida; Michalis Delta | Garbage; Patti Smith; Fun Lovin' Criminals; Terrorvision; Bokomolech; Make Believe; Closer | The Prodigy + Terror X Crew; The Afghan Whigs; Bloodhound Gang; Queens of the Stone Age; The Earthbound; Sigmatropic |

== 1998 lineup ==
The festival took place in Freattyda, Piraeus.

| Monday 13 July | Tuesday 14 July | Wednesday 15 July | Thursday 16 July |
|---|---|---|---|
| Pyx Lax; Natacha Atlas; Ypogeia Revmata; Theodosia Tsatsou; George Dimitriadis & Oi Mikroi Iroes; Petros Theotokatos; Valia Kalda | Nick Cave and the Bad Seeds; Trypes; Moby; Cornershop; Endelechia; Ellinistan | Portishead; Spiritualized; Asian Dub Foundation; Konstantinos Vita; Active Member; Psofioi Korioi | Pulp; Sonic Youth; Xylina Spathia; Puressence; Bokomolech; Closer |

== 1997 lineup ==
The festival took place in Rizoupoli Stadium, now called Georgios Kamaras Stadium.

| Wednesday 9 July | Thursday 10 July | Friday 11 July |
|---|---|---|
| Xaris & Panos Katsimichas; Pyx Lax; Sotiria Leonardou; Ypogeia Revmata; Manolis Famelos kai oi Podilates; Τsopana Rave | The Sisters of Mercy; New Model Army; Diafana Krina; The Flowers of Romance; Love in Sadness | Megadeth; Bruce Dickinson feat. Adrian Smith; Grip Inc. Rotting Christ; Dark Nova |

== 1996 lineup ==
The first festival was called "Rock of Gods" and took place in the Dock 3 of the Piraeus harbour.
Motörhead was included in the first day of the festival, but cancelled and Saxon filled up their spot. Foo Fighters were to play on the third day of the festival, but Dave Grohl broke his arm at a previous show and Violent Femmes took their place.

| Friday 12 July | Saturday 13 July | Sunday 14 July |
|---|---|---|
| Slayer; Saxon; Blind Guardian; Rage; Nightfall; Fatal Morgana | Violent Femmes; The Jesus and Mary Chain; Bad Religion; Paradise Lost; Dead Moon; Bokomolech | Iggy Pop; Violent Femmes; Moby; Stereo Nova; In Trance '95; Oh! My Garden |
