= Assassination of Sergio Ramelli =

1975 murder in Milan, Italy

- Date: 29 April 1975
- Location: Milan, Italy
- Type: Assassination
- Motive: Political and ideological opposition
- Organised by: Militants of the extra-parliamentary communist organization Avanguardia Operaia
- Participants: Antonio Belpiede; Franco Castelli; Brunella Colombelli; Claudio Colosio; Marco Costa; Giuseppe Ferrari Bravo; Luigi Montinari; Claudio Scazza

The assassination of Sergio Ramelli was a crime that took place in Milan, Italy, in 1975, perpetuated by members of the extreme-left organisation names Avanguardia Operaia.

== Social and political context ==
Following the 1969–70 large-scale series of industrial action in Northern Italy, the acts of civil disobedience and mass demonstrations often turned to violent confrontations between leftist militants and the law enforcement authorities of the Italian state. In November 1969, policeman Antonio Annarumma, while on duty during a demonstration organized by the Maoist organization Unione dei Comunisti Italiani (Marxisti-Leninisti), was killed after being struck by an iron tube hurled by demonstrators and losing control of the police car he was driving. On 12 December of that year right-wing terrorists allegedly exploded a bomb at the headquarters of Banca Nazionale dell'Agricoltura in Piazza Fontana, near the Duomo, killing 17 people and wounding 88. On 15 December 1969, Giuseppe "Pino" Pinelli, member of the Milan-based anarchist association Ponte della Ghisolfa and secretary of the Italian branch of the Anarchist Black Cross, died while being detained by the Italian police. Similar events introduced a period of unprecedented social conflict in the urban centers of Italy, with acts of violence carried out almost daily by both right- and left-wing organizations.

On 16 April 1975, two organizations of the extra-parliamentary left, Lotta Continua and Avanguardia Operaia organized a demonstration in the city of Milan, along with unions of house tenants, in protest against high rents and in support of the right to housing. A group of demonstrators broke off from the procession to head to the University of Milan and in piazza Cavour they crossed paths with three militants from the Fronte universitario d'azione nazionale or FUAN, the student branch of the neofascist MSI. In the ensuing clash, as was subsequently reported in L'Unità, two of the neofascists managed to get away while the third, Antonio Braggion, due to a physical impediment in his leg, was forced to take refuge in his Mini Minor car. The left-wing militants surrounded the car and began to hit it with blunt objects, shattering the glass. Braggion was armed with a revolver and from inside his car let off three shots, (Note: Braggion managed initially to escape but was caught and put to trial three years later. He was sentenced to 5 years imprisonment for "negligent excess in self-defense" and another 5 years for "illegal possession of a weapon." The sentences were reduced to 3 and 3 respectively, on appeal. Braggion died in Milan in 2018. See Dazzi (2018).) one of which fatally wounded student Claudio Varalli.

On 17 April, again in Milan, demonstrators from the left, protesting the killing of Varalli, clashed with a carabinieri riot unit. Reinforcements were called in by the unit and a truck speeding in from the via Lamarmora barracks went over the sidewalk, and fell on 28-year-old Giannino Zibecchi, a militant of the Comitati di vigilanza antifascista, the Committees of antifascist vigilance. The police stated that the truck "skidded;" the organizers of the demonstration stated that the truck fell deliberately on the protesters who were on the sidewalk. (Note: The truck's driver, 18-year old carabiniere Sergio Chiarieri, second lieutenant Alberto Gambardella who was head of the truck's crew, and captain Alberto Gonella who was in charge of the carabinieri contingent were put on trial. On 28 November 1980, the Criminal Court of Milan acquitted them on all charges. The relatives of the victim appealed to the Supreme Court, which ruled in affirmation of the Criminal Court's decision. See Telese (2015).) Zibecchi died from his wounds.

== Background ==
Sergio Ramelli was born in Milan on 8 July 1956 to parents Mario Ramelli and Anita Pozzoli. He had an older brother, Luigi, and a younger sister, Simona.

Initially, he entered the Technical Institute Ettore Molinari to study Chemistry. Having enlisted from early on in the Youth Front (Fronte della Gioventù) of the MSI, he was a target of various incidents at the Institute for being a fascist. On 13 January 1975, according to testimony at the trial, Ramelli was ambushed by a group of young boys while leaving school and was forced to erase with a brush and white paint some fascist writings from the institute's wall. On 3 February 1975, Mario Ramelli, accompanied by Sergio, entered the institute to complete the necessary paperwork for a petition to transfer his son to a private school. In the corridor, they were both physically attacked by a group of students, while the headmaster and the professors who were accompanying them were also beaten up. Outside the building where the Ramelli family was living, the words Ramelli, fascista, sei il primo della lista ("Ramelli, fascist, you are the first on the list") were painted on a wall shortly before the attack.

== The homicide ==
Among the many tactics used by militants from both sides was the so-called practice "dei cucchini" ("of the spoons"): A prominent member of the opposite camp would be ambushed outside their place of work or residence, and then "severely" beaten up, i.e. they were to be cuccarlo ("cooked"), as a means of intimidation. According to the subsequent testimony of Avanguardia Operaia member Luigi Montinari, some young persons at the university, led by Roberto “Riccio” Grassi, decided in a meeting to "give Ramelli a lesson," while according to Giuseppe Ferrari Bravo's testimony "the order came from above [from the Avanguardia Operaia hierarchy]."

On 13 March 1975, around noon, a group of eight went to wait for Ramelli near his home. Six individuals acted as lookouts while Marco Costa and Giuseppe Ferrari Bravo were assigned the task of the physical assault.

Ramelli was attacked, at approximately 13:00 hrs, as he was taking out his parked scooter. The beatings with Hazet wrenches and iron bars to the head stopped, according to the defendants' testimony at the subsequent trial, when a woman from a nearby balcony started shouting at them. The group of attackers left the scene as Ramelli remained unconscious on the pavement. He was taken by ambulance to the Policlinico of Milan where he remained in a coma for forty-seven days before succumbing to his wounds and dying on 29 April 1975.

== Funeral and reactions ==
Ramelli's funeral took place at the Basilica dei Santi Nereo e Achilleo. The President of the Republic Giovanni Leone sent a wreath of flowers. MSI secretary Giorgio Almirante attended the religious ceremony. The coffin was interred in the family tomb at the cemetery of Lodi in Lombardy, the funeral procession having been banned by the local authorities out of fear of clashes between right- and left-wing "extremists."

Pier Paolo Pasolini, in a letter he wrote to Italo Calvino after the death of Ramelli, wrote:

When I speak of the conformity [omologazione] of all young people, therefore, from [Ramelli's] body, his behavior and his subconscious and real ideology (the consumerist hedonism), a young fascist cannot be distinguished from all the other young people. I am enunciating a general phenomenon.

In L'Unità, Claudio Petruccioli, journalist and co-founder of Movimento Lavoratori per il Socialismo ("Workers' Movement for Socialism"), wrote:

In the iron bars that left Ramelli dying on the sidewalk of Via Amedeo there was neither a desire for redemption nor love for freedom. In those blows there was only blind and smug violence, entirely individualistic, aimed at nothing else but at reproducing itself in an endless spiral: such as to arouse horror and repulsion in every sincere democrat, in every honest man.

== Trials ==
Following a series of research and interrogations undertaken by magistrates Maurizio Grigo and Guido Salvini, (Note: In 2021, magistrates Guido Salvini and Maurizio Grigo said that they did not consider the homicide to be "terrorism" but "an act of political violence." They added: "During the investigation we felt a sense of isolation, as if certain circles of the Milanese bourgeoisie did not look kindly on the reopening of that chapter. We were, as it were, accused of trying '1968'." See Veltroni (2021).) ten suspects were identified and indicted with various criminal violations. Their trial began some twelve years after the crime, on 16 March 1987. The defendants were: Claudio Colosio, Franco Castell, Giuseppe Ferrari Bravo, Luigi Montinari, Walter Cavallari, Claudio Scazza, Brunella Colombelli, Giovanni Di Domenico, Antonio Belpiede, and Marco Costa. Roberto "Ricchio" Grassi had committed suicide. Most defendants were members of Avanguardia Operaia's security detachment in the Medicine faculty of the University of Milan.

During the trial, the organization Democrazia Proletaria ("Proletarian Democracy") established a presence of vigilance in Piazza Fontana. The trial ended on 2 March 1989 with the following verdicts: Marco Costa was sentenced to 15 years and 6 months in prison; Giuseppe Ferrari Bravo and Claudio Colosio to 15 years; Antonio Belpiede, at the time capogruppo of the PCI in Cerignola, to 13 years; Brunella Colombelli to 12 years for having guided the attackers to Ramelli's place and indicating the time to strike; Franco Castelli, Claudio Scazza, and Luigi Montinari were sentenced to 11 years in prison. Giovanni Di Domenico, member of Democrazia Proletaria in Gorgonzola, and Walter Cavallari were acquitted.

On appeal, "mitigating circumstances" were accepted by the court and the sentences were reduced: Marco Costa's sentence went from 15 years to 11 years and 4 months; Ferrari Bravo's from 15 to 10 years and 10 months; Colosio's from 15 years to 7 years and 9 months; Belpiede's from 13 to 7 years; the sentences of Castelli, Collombelli, and Montinari were all reduced to 6 years and 3 months.

The role of lawyer for the victim's family was supported by Ignazio La Russa.

In January 1990, the Supreme Court of Cassation reclassified the crime as voluntary manslaughter and not, as in the first trial, premeditated murder. The sentences were further reduced: Marco Costa and Giuseppe Ferrari Bravo were sentenced by the Supreme Court to respectively 10 years and 9 years and 9 months imprisonment; Antonio Belpiede and Claudio Colosio were sentenced to 7 years imprisonment; Brunella Colombelli, Franco Castelli, Claudio Scazza, and Luigi Montinari to 6 years and three months.

Marco Costa and Giuseppe Ferrari Bravo did a reduced time in prison, benefitting, along with the other convicted defendants, most of whom served "alternative penalties," from a pardon decided on account of their "social condition" and the "reduced danger" they posed.

== Aftermath ==
In demonstrations of the Italian Left in the early 1970s, the cry "Hazet trentasei / fascista dove sei?" ("Hazet 36 / Fascist, where are you?") (Note: The term refers to the Hazet wrench, also called chiave Inglese ("English wrench"), of specifically 36-inch size, manufactured by Hazet.) was often heard, because the Hazet wrench, "almost as long as a forearm," was typically used by leftist militants in street fighting, ostensibly "as a response to the knives, pistols, and hand grenades" employed by the Milanese far-right. The cry, after Ramelli's death, fell gradually into disuse, while, within the extra-parliamentary left in Italy, a period of internal discourse and "harsh" self-criticism began on the use of violence in the ideological struggle.

Two years after Ramelli's death, in 1977, the leaders of Avanguardia Operaia dissolved the organization, concerned about the law enforcement's increased activities directed against it but mainly to discourage members from being attracted to the armed struggle.

== Repentance and reflections on the past ==
Some ten years after the crime, a letter was sent to Ramelli's mother, signed by Franco Castelli, Luigi Montanari, Claudio Colosio, Claudio Scazza, and Walter Cavallari, which began with the following passage:

Dear Mrs. Ramelli

This letter reaches you with much, too much delay: we realize that the simple fact of receiving it and perhaps reading it will make you suffer. Those who write today are very different men from the boys of that tragic day. We would have liked to write to you many years ago: instead we were alone; each tried to take refuge in his own home, not forgetting, indeed assailed by the profound remorse of that unfortunate moment.

We had nothing personal against your son, we had never known nor seen him before; but, as was too often the case at that time, the fact of thinking in different ways automatically became the cause of gratuitous and unjustifiable violence. But none of us had the intention or even the simple suspicion that everything would end up so terribly.

Today, we consider it profoundly wrong, indeed inconceivable, to settle the differences between different ways of thinking with the practice of violence.

Claudio Colosio, by 2020, was teaching Occupational Medicine at the University of Milan, heading a San Paolo Hospital unit, and working for the World Health Organization on the containment of hospital-acquired infections. In mid-April 2020, the Lombardy authorities expelled Colosio from the region's scientific committee in charge of the COVID-19 emergency. Colosio stated: "I find myself dealing with a sad story that happened 45 years ago. I struggle to talk about a story that has caused so much pain. I believe it is time to think about a true national reconciliation, even in the face of the [covid] emergency we are experiencing. I hope that young people will no longer repeat the mistakes of the past."

Stefano Boeri, an architect and urban planner running in 2010 as a candidate in the centre-left Democratic Party's primaries for mayor of Milan, (Note: In November 2010, Boeri, having also the support of Left Ecology Freedom, despite not being himself a member of the party, won the Democratic Party primaries and ran as mayoral candidate. In the May 2011 elections, independent Giuliano Pisapia won. See Monestiroli (2010).) and a participant in the 1975 attack on Antonio Braggion, stated that "these were years of passion [and] turbulence, tragic, dramatic. Basically it is true, there was a cold-blooded assault on our part against [Ramelli], things went like that. Those who led us were not always thinking in a balanced manner." He concluded: "The truth is that there was an abyss between our illusions and the reality around us."

Giuseppe Ferrari Bravo worked for a time as a journalist at Liberazione, the newspaper of the Partito della Rifondazione Comunista (Communist Refoundation Party) and has never publicly referred to the Ramelli case. Antonio Belpiede and Brunella Colombelli have never admitted to having participated in the attack.

In 2020, Walter Veltroni, prominent member in the Italian Communist Party and historical first leader of the Democratic Party, wrote in Corriere della Sera: "Conflict in a democracy is vital. Even the hardest conflict. Without conflict there is no freedom. But hate is a pathology. And those years were an epidemic of this evil. There have been no just and unjust deaths. Only innocent deaths." Author and journalist Christian Raimo criticized Veltroni's position, writing in Italy's Jacobin: "Veltroni equates fascists with anti-fascists and rewrites a story into one that appeals to the extreme right." Giorgia Meloni, then a member of Brothers of Italy, (Note: Meloni and her party won the 2022 Italian general election, and she was appointed prime minister of Italy.) congratulated Veltroni, tweeting: "We must all work hard so that those dark years, in which so many innocent people of the left and the right lost their lives, never return."

== Commemorations ==
In 2011, the Monza municipal council decided to name "Sergio Ramelli" the gardens of via Calatafimi, as did in 2020 the city of Milan for the gardens of via Bronzino. In 2021, the city of Lodi named a street after Ramelli.

On the anniversary date of Ramelli's death, neofascist groups have often organized commemorative gatherings in Milan and elsewhere, some featuring attendees performing the roman salute, in which the memory of other "fascist comrades" was also "honored", such as Carlo Borsani's, a fascist executed by the Italian partisans in 1945, gatherings which have drawn media criticism and the objection of the public prosecutor.

== See also ==
- Primavalle fire
- Mikis Mantakas
- Acca Larentia killings
- Piazza della Loggia bombing
- Italicus Express bombing
- Terrorism in Italy
