= Acca Larentia killings =

Political killings in Italy

Franco Bigonzetti
- Born: 5 March 1958; Rome, Italy
- Died: 7 January 1978 (aged 19); Rome, Italy
- Cause of death: Ballistic trauma
- Occupation: Italian Social Movement (MSI) member
- Known for: Victim of unsolved murder

Francesco Ciavatta
- Born: 11 September 1959; Montagano, Italy
- Died: 7 January 1978 (aged 18); Rome, Italy
- Cause of death: Ballistic trauma
- Occupation: MSI member
- Known for: Victim of unsolved murder

The Acca Larentia killings, also known in Italy as the Acca Larentia massacre (Italian: strage di Acca Larenzia), were a double homicide that occurred in Rome on 7 January 1978. The attack was claimed by the self-described Nuclei Armati per il Contropotere Territoriale (Armed Nuclei for Territorial Counterpower). Members of militant far-left groups were charged but acquitted, and the culprits were never identified.

Five teenagers of the Youth Front, the youth wing of the Italian Social Movement, a neo-fascist party, were ambushed while leaving the local party headquarters, and two of the teens (aged 18 and 19) were killed. The killings led to riots that same day, in which another MSI sympathiser was killed in clashes with police. Commemorations for the Acca Larentia killings take place each year and are controversial. In 2024 opposition parties claimed that such displays of pro-fascist sentiment were outlawed and demanded an investigation. The Italian judiciary has exonerated the individuals who take part in this initiative, as it has been deemed purely commemorative of the murdered individuals.

== Events ==
Five members of the MSI were fired upon with automatic weapons by a group of five or six assailants while they were leaving the local party headquarters in via Acca Larenzia to distribute pamphlets. Franco Bigonzetti and Francesco Ciavatta were killed, while Vincenzo Segneri, although wounded, managed to return to the party headquarters with Maurizio Lupini and Giuseppe D'Audino, both of whom were unharmed.

Riots broke out later on the same day between the police and a crowd of MSI activists that had gathered at the site. Nineteen-year-old Stefano Recchioni was fatally injured by a stray bullet and several others, including Youth Front national secretary Gianfranco Fini, were wounded by tear gas canisters. Carabinieri officer Edoardo Sivori was suspected of killing Recchioni but was never charged.

== Aftermath ==
The killings further polarised Italian politics during the Years of Lead and led to a fracture within the neo-fascist movement, with more radical militants blaming the party leadership for its failure to denounce the police for Recchioni's death and choosing to join emerging extremist groups like the far-right Armed Revolutionary Nuclei. The attack was claimed by the self-described Armed Nuclei for Territorial Counterpower. Five members of far-left group Lotta Continua were charged with the murders in 1987 but subsequently acquitted of all charges. A Škorpion submachine gun, proven by ballistics to have been used in the attack, was found in 1988 in a Red Brigades safehouse in Milan.

Singer and songwriter Fabrizio Marzi dedicated the song Giovinezza (Youth) to Recchioni in 1979. Riots broke out during commemorations of the victims on 10 January 1979, with seventeen-year-old Alberto Giaquinto being fatally injured by police officer Alessio Speranza, who was convicted after four trials and ten years of negligent excess of self-defence. In 2013, then-mayor of Rome and former MSI member Gianni Alemanno named a street of the city after the three victims. In 2014, he further commemorated the victims and criticised Ignazio Marino, the-then mayor of the city, for not doing the same.

In January 2024, hundreds of neo-fascists gathered at the MSI's former headquarters to commemorate the Acca Larentia killings. They did fascist salutes and shouted: "Camerati, present!" They also did a typical rallying cry at neo-fascist events: "For all fallen comrades!" This prompted criticism from the opposition and outrage. Marco Vizzardelli, a theatre-goer who was quickly identified by DIGOS for shouting "Long live anti-fascist Italy!" at La Scala, said that he was "outraged", adding: "Nobody stopped them, double standards." Fabio Rampelli of Brothers of Italy (FdI), an MSI-heir party that also commemorates the victims, said that these were loose cannons and that FdI had nothing to do with it. Opposition leaders, such as Elly Schlein, asked Giorgia Meloni, the prime minister of Italy and FdI member, to apply the ban of neo-fascist groups that is part of the Italian Penal code which far-right groups are able to circumvent by using a different name and proclaiming themselves to be new political forces. Others also urged Meloni and Lazio regional government president Francesco Rocca to distance themselves.

== See also ==
- 2013 Neo Irakleio Golden Dawn office shooting
- Assassination of Sergio Ramelli
- Francesca Mambro
- List of unsolved murders (1900–1979)
- Mikis Mantakas
- Primavalle fire
- Sergio Ramelli
- Strategy of tension
- Valerio Fioravanti

== Bibliography ==
- Colombo, Andrea (2007). Storia nera. Bologna. La verità di Francesca Mambro e Valerio Fioravanti (in Italian). Milan: Cairo editore. ISBN 978-88-6052-091-3.
- Morelli, Massimiliano (2008). Acca Larentia. Asfalto nero sangue (in Italian). Turin: Bradipolibri editore. ISBN 978-88-88329-84-0.
- Telese, Luca (2006). Cuori neri. Dal rogo di Primavalle alla morte di Ramelli (in Italian). Milan: Solferino. ISBN 88-200-3615-0.
