= Primavalle fire =

1973 arson attack in Rome, Italy

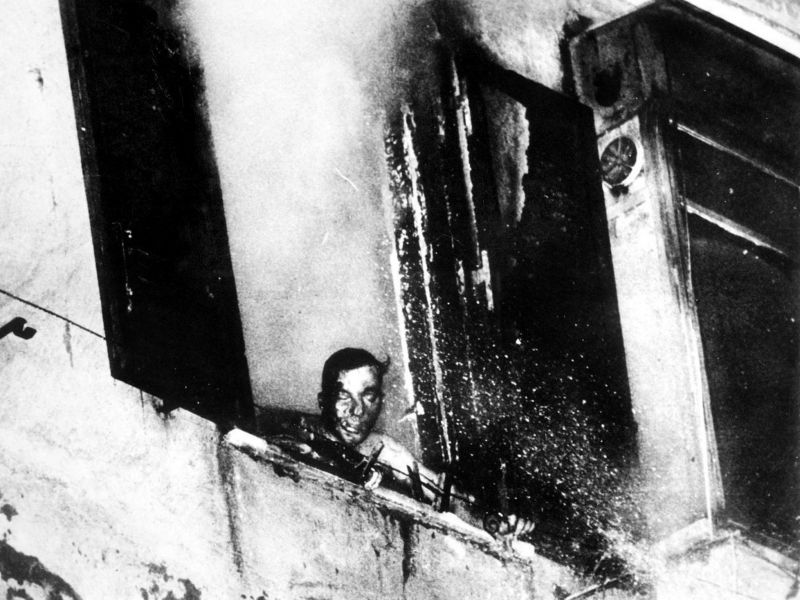
- Corpse of Virgilio Mattei, who was killed in the attack
- Location: Primavalle, Rome, Italy
- Date: 16 April 1973 approx. 3 am
- Target: Home of a local MSI leader
- Attack type: Arson
- Deaths: 2
- Injuries: 2
- Perpetrators: Convicted: Achille Lollo, Marino Clavo, and Manlio Grillo, members of Potere Operaio

The Primavalle fire (Italian: Rogo di Primavalle) was a political arson-attack that occurred in Rome in 1973. It resulted in the death of two people.

== Background ==
On 12 April 1973, in Milan, policeman Antonio Marino of the Reparto Mobile, was on active duty during a demonstration held by MSI (the Italian neofascist Movimento Sociale Italiano, Italian Social Movement) in protest against "red violence." There were clashes between the police and demonstrators, a group of which engaged in vandalism and also attacked police stations by throwing hand grenades. One of the grenades exploded on Marino, killing him instantly. The perpetrators were subsequently identified as members of the neofascist Milanese group La Fenice ("The Phoenix"), (Note: The group took its name from the nationalist magazine of the same title whose first issue appeared in 1971. Their objective, as it was stated in the magazine, was "to impose a new order, an order of militants and fighters...aimed at only one purpose: the conquest of power." See Associazione Italiana Vittime del Terrorismo (2021).) and brought to trial.

== Arson attack ==
In the 1970s, garbage collector and MSI activist Mario Mattei was living in a 3rd floor apartment in the Primavalle quarter of Rome with his wife Annamaria and their six children: Virgilio, 22 years old, a member of Volontari Nazionali, the militant branch of the MSI; Silvia, 19 years old; Lucia, 15; Antonella, 9; Stefano, 8; and Giampaolo, 3.

During the night of 16 April 1973, flammable and explosive materials, including gasoline, were thrown under the door and inside the family's apartment and ignited, starting a fire. Mario Mattei threw himself and Lucia off a balcony to a lower floor. His wife Anna escaped, along with the two youngest children, Antonella and Giampaolo, through the burning apartment entrance. Silvia threw herself from the kitchen balcony, but clotheslines cushioned the fall and she ended up on the ground with only two rib fractures. Virgilio and Stefano were unable to jump out of the window, so Virgilio looked out asking for help. Eventually, Virgilio and Stefano burned to death. The two dead bodies were found charred, near each other.

== Attribution ==
Near the Mattei home, pamphlets were found that read:

"Tanas Brigade (Note: Giuseppe Tanas was a Sardinian former partisan living after the war in Primavalle, and a member of the workers’ union Confederazione Generale Italiana del Lavoro ("Italian General Confederation of Labour"). On 5 December 1947, he took part along with other protesters in a strike "against hunger." A demonstration by the strikers resulted in clashes with the police in which the police fired gunshots. Tanas was killed in the firing, with no one ever being indicted for the shooting. See King (2018).) - class war - Death to the fascists - the MSI headquarters - Mattei and Schiavoncino (Note: An erroneous writing (see Solinas, 2021) of the name of Marcello Schiaoncin, a small-truck driver and neofascist who, along with his wife Anna, known as "Anna the fascist," were politically active in the Primavalle area at the time of the arson attack. See Pottere Operaio (1973).) hit by proletarian justice."

In the aftermath of the fire, there was speculation that the attack was carried out by "rival" neofascists. Anna Schiaoncin explicitly accused "ultras" from the MSI section named "Giarabub." (Note: "Giarabub" was an MSI section named in honour of the Italians who fought in the siege of Giarabub during the WW2 African campaign.)

In December 1973, a "collective" from Potere Operaio published a booklet about the arson attack, written, as its authors stated, "by militants for militants," and titled Primavalle: arson with closed doors. The text's conclusion, summarized in the introduction, was as follows:

The hype about the Primavalle fire does not look like the result of a long and premeditated provocation. 'Primavalle' is rather a plot constructed frantically, feverishly, by the police and the judiciary...to transform a trivial accident or a dark episode, created and grown in the wormhole of the fascist section of the district, into an occasion to revive neofascist extremism when its credibility had been severely undermined after the events of Black Thursday (Note: The term "Black Thursday" was used by Italian journalists and politicians to denote the events of 12 April 1973 when policeman Marino was killed. See Ferrari (2016).) and the assassination of policeman Marino.

The work attributed the arson attack to a struggle among neofascists between "Ordinovists and Almirantians," i.e. between supporters of the Ordine Nuovo armed militancy and "moderates" who supported Giorgio Almirante's "parliamentarism". The booklet's January 1974 publication included an open letter by Italian Socialist Party member of parliament Riccardo Lombardi addressed in "solidarity and support" to Potere Operario member Achille Lollo, accused at the time for the arson.

The organization Lotta Continua ("Continuous Struggle") issued a statement claiming that "the fascist provocation has gone beyond all limits and has reached the point of fascism murdering its own children." The newspaper Il manifesto declared that it was "a Nazi crime." The published photographs of the burning apartment and a victim of the fire drew "universal condemnation" of the act.

== Arrests and trial ==
Immediately after the fire, in late April 1973, the investigation of the crime began by deputy prosecutor Domenico Sica. The investigation was mainly directed towards the "hard core" of Potere Operaio and, on 7 May, the prosecutor identified Achille Lollo, Marino Clavo, and Manlio Grillo, all Potere Operaio members, as the perpetrators. Arrest warrants were issued against the three suspects who, the prosecution stated, had already made themselves known within the organization as il gruppo Tanas.

After the arrest warrants were issued, numerous demonstrations by the left in Italy were held protesting the indictments and supporting the innocence of the accused, demonstrations that after the trial itself began, on 24 February 1975, turned violent. The most serious episode took place on 28 February 1975, when young people from the right and left clashed outside the Court, with the violence spreading over to Via Ottaviano, where a Greek student and far-right militant, Mikis Mantakas, was shot dead. (Note: Alvaro Lojacono, a member at the time of Potere Operaio and future Red Brigades militant, was indicted for the assassination of Mantakas and, after being declared not guilty in the 1977 trial, was retried in 1980 on appeal and sentenced in absentia to 16 years imprisonment. See La Repubblica (2019).)

Only Achille Lollo was present when the trial began; the other two defendants, Marino Clavo and Manlio Grillo, had absconded abroad. Anna Schiaoncin, testifying as a witness, repeated her claims about neofascist complicity in the arson. Various prominent leftists, such as Alberto Moravia, Dario Bellezza, Elio Pecora, Ruggero Guarini, and others, publicly supported the innocence of the accused and expressed their solidarity with them.

The prosecutor proposed life sentences for all three defendants. On 15 June 1975, the jury acquitted the defendants, citing "lack of sufficient evidence." On 30 June 1981, the court of appeals declared the previous trial null and void, but, on 28 May 1984, the Supreme Court ordered a new trial, which began after more than two years, in December 1986. The retrial ended with a guilty verdict for the three defendants. They were sentenced, once again in absentia, to terms of imprisonment ranging from 3 to 18 years for manslaughter and arson. The sentence became final on 13 October 1987.

== Ideological and political repercussions ==
In 1973, at the organization's national conference, held in Rosolina from 31 May until 3 June, two sides in Potere Operaio clashed, on account of the Primavalle arson: The Rome grouping of Franco Piperno and Oreste Scalzone and the Venetian one whose main ideological reference had been the work of Toni Negri. The latter grouping accused the former of "adventurism". Piperno responded by arguing that the organization needed to remain active in the fields of both political and armed combat.

Militant Mario Dalmaviva, elected general secretary at the conclusion of that conference, wrote later that Rosolina "ratified the defeat of the platform that emerged from the 1971 conference in Rome," where Potere Operaio had been defined as "the party of insurrection." Various intellectuals, who had long been critical of what they viewed as the neo-Leninist direction, left. Many from the Rome grouping left as well to follow the path of the armed struggle through other formations, such as Prima Linea. Some Venice members left to join forces with the communist party's Gramsci group. Potere Operaio was "effectively dissolved" on that day in 1973. Dalmaviva wrote, "I was elected general secretary to turn off the light."

== Revelations ==
After the first trial ended, Achille Lollo fled to Sweden, then to Nicaragua, where he got married and had four children. He then moved to Brazil where he continued to serve in leftist causes. Manlio Grillo had left for Sweden and then moved on to Nicaragua, helped by Potere Operaio co-founder Oreste Scalzone, who also assisted Lollo. (Note: Grillo's stated the following: "Yes, Oreste [Scalzone] has always been a great friend. It was simpler than you can imagine. He gave me the name and address of a Swedish friend of his, [saying] 'Let her help you.' I took a plane and went to Stockholm, and she helped me so much that after a short time we got married." See Oppes (2005).) He never returned to Italy. Marino Clavo has remained incommunicado, believed to be somewhere in South America.

While still in Brazil, Lollo, in a February 2005 interview, revealed that the arson, which, he claimed, was intended as an "act of intimidation" against Mattei, was a Potere Operaio act and implicated in it not only his two co-defendants but a total of six persons including himself: Diana Perrone, daughter of Ferdinando Perrone and niece of Sandro Perrone, then owners of Il Messaggero; Elisabetta Lecco, Marino Clavo's girlfriend at the time; and Paolo Gaeta. All three reacted with "indignation" to the statements by Lollo, with Paolo Gaeta citing, as cause for the "lies," his comrades' refusal to provide Lollo with the "false alibi" he'd asked.

A few days after the Lollo interview appeared, on 16 February 2005, Manlio Grillo told Italian journalists Lollo was "lying" in that "there were only three of us." He revealed also that he had secretly travelled back to Italy "many times," always leaving before a new trial was coming up, before eventually settling in Nicaragua.

On 13 February 2005, Franco Piperno, who, along with Oreste Scalzone and Toni Negri, had co-founded Potere Operaio in 1969, stated that the arson attack was "a most serious episode" that he considered as "one of the main causes of the dissolution of Potere Operaio." He added that he "will carry forever the moral weight of what happened thirty years ago [in Primavalle]." Piperno stated that the organization's leadership "believed in the innocence [of the accused]" but, nonetheless, "questioned all of Primavalle's comrades...also Gaeta, Perrone and Lecco" who "covered Lollo and the others."

When "doubts multiplied" at the top of Potere Operaio, an internal investigation was assigned to Valerio Morucci, (Note: Valerio Morucci, after the 1973 dissolution of Potere Operaio, continued to be active in armed militancy, eventually joining in 1976 the Red Brigades.) at the time in charge of the organization's "illegal work." As Piperno claimed, Morucci reported to the leadership that Marino Clavo, whom he'd interrogated in a Florence hiding place, confessed the culpability of Lollo, Grillo, and himself. Piperno, in the 2005 interview, concluded that "in those days of hatred on both sides" the prevalent moral stance was that "the end justifies the means." And, in view also of the fact that the whole of the Italian Left was supporting at the time the innocence of Potere Operaio, Piperno insisted that "telling [the truth] would not have been possible at all."

In 2005, all the sentences were declared "written off" by the Court of Appeal of Rome and, in January 2011, Lollo returned to Italy. He died on 3 August 2021, aged 70, at the hospital of Bracciano.

In 2021, Luciano Randazzo, a lawyer for the Mattei family, claimed that Giampaolo Mattei was contacted by Walter Veltroni, formerly a member of the Italian Communist Party and the first leader of the Democratic party, who proposed "closure" with "the events of the 1970s." Randazzo added that he personally agreed with this proposal of peace but told Giampaolo that "someone had to apologize" for the Primavalle arson attack, though "no one had yet done so."

== See also ==
- Years of Lead (Italy)
- Acca Larentia killings
