= 2013 Neo Irakleio Golden Dawn office shooting =

Political murder of two Golden Dawn members in Athens, Greece

- Location: 38°03′14″N 23°46′06″E; 420 Heraklion Avenue, Neo Irakleio, Athens, Greece
- Date: 1 November 2013 (CET)
- Target: Golden Dawn
- Attack type: Drive-by shooting, assassination
- Weapon: 9 mm Tokarev-type semi-automatic pistol
- Deaths: 2
- Injuries: 1
- Perpetrator: Militant People's Revolutionary Forces
- No. of participants: 2
- Motive: Retaliation for the murder of Pavlos Fyssas

On 1 November 2013, two members of the Golden Dawn political party were killed, and a third injured in a drive-by shooting attack outside the offices of the Golden Dawn in Neo Irakleio, Athens. The attack was claimed by anti-fascists in retaliation for the murder of Pavlos Fyssas, comments made by the investigating authorities coincide with this claim.

== Murders ==
On 1 November 2013, two men approached the headquarters of the Golden Dawn party in Neo Irakleio, a northern suburb of Athens, by motorcycle and fired at three Golden Dawn members located outside of the party building. Golden Dawn members Giorgos Fountoulis and Manos Kapelonis were struck and killed, and a third man, Alexandros Gerontas, was seriously injured. At least 12 bullets were fired in the attack which reportedly lasted ten seconds. A witness reported that a man got off a motorcycle, wearing a helmet, and fired at 'close range'. The attack, which was described by police as a "terrorist attack" was caught on CCTV which has been released publicly. Two weeks later, a previously unknown anarchist militant group, the "Militant People's Revolutionary Forces" claimed responsibility for the attacks in a communication to a local news outlet, and said that the attacks were in retaliation for the two months earlier murder of anti-fascist activist and rapper Pavlos Fyssas. Police were unable to verify the authenticity of this claim of responsibility.

== Victims ==
=== Manolis Kapelonis ===
Manolis or Manos Kapelonis (Greek: Μανώλης or Μάνος Καπελώνης) was 22 years old, lived in Galatsi and had studied at the Athens Hellenic College. His father had served as president of the Association of Civil Government before 2010 and is now president in Public Construction Medical Institutions. The offices of the Local Organisation Northern Suburbs opened every Monday and Friday afternoon. He was among the most active part of the ideological faction. Their deputies and officers often made speeches, and their chief texts and the parliamentary candidate in Boeotia often appeared on the official website of the Golden Dawn. His funeral took place on 4 November 2013, at the Church of Ipapanti in Artemida, with the discreet presence of police, and without media coverage, upon his family's request.

=== Giorgos Fountoulis ===
Giorgos or Yiorgos Fountoulis (Greek: Γιώργος Φουντούλης) was 27 years old, lived in Neo Irakleio, and had studied physiotherapy. He had friends in Golden Dawn and took part in its events and activities, distributing leaflets with Kapelonis. He helped out as a security guard at the offices of Golden Dawn of the Local Organisation Northern Suburbs, and also with Golden Dawn's on-call safeguarding service for elderly pensioners who asked for protection when shopping or collecting their pensions. He had been a Golden Dawn member for at least one year, and was one of the keenest members in the Local Organisation Northern suburbs, though was not at a high level of Golden Dawn in security matters. His father worked at the post office. His funeral took place on 4 November 2013, at the Church of St. Georgios in Irakleio. At the funeral, hundreds shouted "He Lives Forever", also singing the Greek national anthem while holding Greek flags.

== Reactions ==
=== Political reactions ===
The government, through its spokesman Simos Kedikoglou, made the following statement for the double murder: "The killers, whoever they may be, will be dealt with ruthlessly by democracy, justice and the united Greek society. Let everyone know".

All political parties in Greece united in unanimously condemning the attack. The murder of the two members hit the headlines and became the first topic on the global networks in Greece and around the world. The party of Golden Dawn issued an announcement after the assassination blaming the government and the media for the murders, further accusing the government of Antonis Samaras for failing to deal effectively with terrorism while the anti-terrorist branch of the Greek police was investigating Golden Dawn for criminal offenses instead.

The Municipal Council of Thessaloniki condemned, by resolution, the murders of the two men in Neo Irakleio.

In December 2013, the government of Greece offered a reward of one million euros to anyone who would provide information that would lead to the capture of the murderers of Manolis Kapelonis and Giorgos Fountoulis.

=== Other ===
Golden Dawn commemorated thrice in memory of Kapelonis and Fountoulis of the Golden Dawn attended by MP Members and Greek citizens. Commemorations and marches by various far-right organisations and football fans holding candles and torches, also took place in countries like Italy, Serbia and Spain; assorted fascists in London held a demonstration which characterized the victims as "martyrs", and in cities like Rome, Milan and Madrid. Supporters of football teams Radnički Niš, Hellas Verona and Lazio hung banners during a group match with slogans in support of the two victims. The action drew some criticism, with the Union of Italian Jewish Communities releasing a statement which read "Any excuse, even the barbaric murder of the two young men, becomes a legal excuse to support movements that have racism, anti-Semitism and xenophobia in their DNA. Stadium racism is an unacceptable phenomenon and should be treated as such. That is why we hope for immediate action and strict measures by the competent authorities".

The mother of one of the killed Golden Dawn members was praised in the media for her 'dignified and outspoken response', saying "I want to send a message especially to our youth, who are going through such difficult times, not to create such extremism ... Bloodshed is not the right way. Where do we live? In a jungle?"

== Claim of responsibility ==
Two weeks later on 16 November, a journal called Zougla announced that an unknown person contacted the station informing them the area where an envelope which contained a USB stick was placed; and that the communique was stored on it. Zougla uploaded the 18-page communique, in which a previously unknown organization, the "Militant People's Revolutionary Forces", claimed the responsibility for the "political executions of the fascist members of the Neo-Nazi Golden Dawn party". The proclamation stated that the murders were seen by the group at least in part as retaliation for the fatal stabbing of Pavlos Fyssas by a Golden Dawn member, the communique claimed "The brazen murder of Pavlos Fissas was the drop of blood that made the glass overflow,".

Following the publication of the communique Golden Dawn stated that "the miserable and stupid manifesto of the cowardly murderers proves that they belong to the criminal ideological womb of the far left".

The anti-terrorist branch of the Greek police announced in 2013 that is considered the digital proclamation as authentic that it was investigating the case. Shortly after the attacks, it was reported that police suspected urban guerrillas groups such as Conspiracy of Fire Nuclei or Sect of Revolutionaries as well as Nikos Maziotis, a member of Revolutionary Struggle who was at the time on the run from the police.

== See also ==
- Acca Larentia killings
- Anarchism in Greece
- List of unsolved murders (2000–present)
- Mikis Mantakas
