= Mikis Mantakas =

Greek murder victim

Mikis Mandakas (Greek: Μίκης Μάντακας; June 13, 1952 – February 28, 1975) was a Greek nationalist student who was murdered by far-left terrorists in Italy during the Years of Lead.

== Biography ==
Mikis Mandakas was born in Athens, Greece. He was the son of army officer Nikos Mandakas and mother Kalliopi Mandaka. In his adulthood he studied medicine in Italy, first in Bologna and later in Rome. He was known for his active involvement in political movements and was particularly opposed to leftist extremism. During his studies in Rome he joined the youth of Italian far-right party the Italian Social Movement (MSI), FUAN.

== The murder ==
On 16 April 1973, the home of Mario Mattei and secretary to the local right-wing party MSI was set ablaze in an incident that would later come to be known as The Primavalle fire. His two children, Stefano and Virgilio (8 and 22 years old) were burned alive.

On 7 May, 1973, the prosecutor identified three members of Potere Operaio as perpetrators, Achille Lollo, Marino Clavo, and Manlio Grillo. As a result, numerous demonstrations by left-wing groups in Italy were held protesting the indictments and further escalating tensions and eventuating in violence after the trial began on February 24, 1975.

The most serious demonstration occurred on February 28, 1975 when demonstrators from the left and right clashed outside the court after the arrival of Achille Lollo accompanied by two carabinieri at approximately 9:15AM. At noon the court interrupts the meeting, at which point the fascists organize to leave. The situation escalates when police in riot gear surrounded the courthouse and began removing protestors from the area surrounding Ottaviano Street.

At 13:15 a large group of leftists gathered outside the court and attempt to storm the building through the main entrance. Michallis, Lollo and the few still present in the building attempted to escape through the side door but were quickly spotted by right-wing demonstrators as they attempted to flee. During the foray, Mantakas was assassinated by Alvaro Lojacono who had attended the protests as a member of Potere Operaio.

Mantakas, unconscious but still alive was carried by his partners into the office where they waited for aid. He would later be transferred to Spiritus Santos hospital where he underwent several blood transfusions. The newspaper Makedonia reported the doctor in charge of Mantakas' surgery as stating "The projectile entered the left area of the parietal bone and crossed the entire skull..". Despite being rushed to hospital, the severity of Mantakas' injuries were eventually too much and at approximately 6:30 PM Mantakas was pronounced dead.

As a result of the fighting, 22 people were wounded by gunfire.

== Reactions ==
Alvaro Lojacono, a member of the Italian Communists (and later the Red Brigades) was identified as the killer and sentenced in absentia to 16 years jail time. As of 2014 he had not served any of his sentence.

Political unrest in Italy followed the murder of Mandakas, resulting in the creation of an armed branch Nuclei Armati Rivoluzionari (NAR) of former members of the MSI. The NAR would eventually incite an attack on 28 February 1978 which resulted in the assassination of a man and three of his comrades. The attackers claimed responsibility for the attack, stating that it was in memory of Mikis Mandakas at the three year anniversary of his murder.

His death become a significant point of contention in Greece and Italy. Many viewed Mantakas' death as a result of the rising political extremism of the time. His desert was mourned by many and he soon became a symbol against violence and extremism. His death was considered tragic and a reflection of the turbulent political climate of Europe in the 1970s. Terrorist attacks, political violence and left and right wing extremism were becoming more common and Mantakas' death shed light on the risks associated with political activism at a time of volatility.

== See also ==
- 2013 Neo Irakleio Golden Dawn office shooting
- Acca Larentia killings
- Primavalle fire
- Sergio Ramelli
