= FF.C =

Greek hip hop band

- Also known as: Fortified Concept; Funky Fresh Concept; Fight Fashion Captivity
- Origin: Athens, Greece
- Genres: Political hip hop, rap rock
- Years active: 1987–2005
- Labels: Polydor; Ichotron
- Past members: Kostas Kourmentalas (MC); Dimitris Petsoukis (producer, MC); Thomas Putikakis, Everlast (DJ); DJ Mix Mad (DJ); Thodoris Maggos (MC); Thodoris Sartetzakis (DJ)

FF.C (Fortified Concept) were a Greek hip hop group that was active from 1987 to 2005. FF.C fused hip hop with rock.

== History ==
The group was formed in 1987. Dimitris Petsoukis was experimenting with his synthesizer when in 1987 he met Kostas Kourmentalas via breakdancing and their mutual love for hip hop. FF.C was formed with DJ Mix Mad. Influenced by American hip hop, FF.C initially stood for "Funky Fresh Concept". They adopted the stage names of High Cool (Petsoukis) and Fresh Cool G (Kourmentalas) while the majority of their raps were in Greek. Thodoris Maggos (Free Jah Present) and Thomas Putikakis (DJ Everlast) soon joined the group.

Horizon Studio was used for their recordings. In 1993 they released their debut album using their own funds because at that time the Greek music industry didn't recognize the hip hop sound as commercially viable. The album was named Skliri Keri (Hard Times) and was pressed on 200 vinyl copies. By that time the FF.C acronym got a new meaning, "Fight Fashion Captivity". On this album Dimitris Petsoukis rapped while most of the lyrics were provided by Kostas Kourmentalas. Thodoris Maggos and DJ Mix Mad left the group after its release, while Thodoris Sartetzakis (Sparky T) joined in.

FF.C continued recording but soon realized that they had to drop their American influences and start to rap only in Greek. Petsoukis and Kourmentalas chose new stage names of Skinothetis and Rythmodamastis respectively, and the group was renamed to "FortiFied Concept". They got the industry's recognition thanks to major labels starting to approach hip hop artists. Thodoris Sartetzakis sent a 20-track demo to Polydor Records, and they managed to get a record deal with the label, in which they released four albums: S'alli diastasi (1997; Thodoris Sartetzakis left the group after its release), I Apili (1998), Ohiromeni Antilipsi (2000) and Ip' Opsin (2002).

Because of their track "Paramythi" being censored by the label, and not being included in the record Ip' Opsin, they left the label soon after its release. They then decided to release their material independently, which led them to Hxotron Productions, where they released their final two albums, Klassika Ixografimena (2004) and Antilipsies Suneidhshs (2005). After that, the group disbanded due to Kostas Kourmentalas' retirement from the music scene.

They have cited Public Enemy as their main influence.

== Discography ==
- Σκληροί Καιροί - Skliroi Kairoi, Hard Times (Independent Production, 1993)
- Σ'άλλη Διάσταση - S'alli Diastasi, In Another Dimension (Polydor, 1997)
- Η Απειλή - I Apeili, The Threat (Polydor, 1998)
- Οχυρωμένη Αντίληψη - Ohiromeni Antilipsi, Fortified Concept (Polydor, 2000)
- Υπ'όψιν - Ip' Opsin, Keep in Mind (Polydor, 2002)
- Κλασσικά Ηχογραφημένα - Klassika Ihografimena, Classic Recorded (Ήχοτρον, 2004)
- Αντιληψίες Συνείδησης - Antilipsies Syneidisis, Concepts of Consciousness (Ήχοτρον, 2005)
