= Terra Vibe Park =

Coordinates: 38.230570°N 23.807266°E

Terra Vibe is a park in Attica, Greece, covering 40 acres (160,000 m^{2}), which opened in 2004. It is used as a venue for concerts and other large-scale outdoor events. The Rockwave Festival and the Terra Vibe Festival are among the gatherings that have taken place there.

Mötley Crüe were due to play Rockwave in 2009 as part of the Crüe Fest tour, but due to heavy rain in the Malakasa area, the venue was ruled unsafe and the event cancelled. Lauren Harris was support. The rain eventually stopped in time for the final day of the festival when Slipknot headlined. The following year, the park hosted the Sonisphere Festival and the Big Four of thrash metal performed with headliners Metallica.

== Artists who have performed at Terra Vibe ==
2004

- W.A.S.P.
- Soulfly
- Dark Tranquillity
- Firewind
- Judas Priest
- Nightwish
- Queensrÿche
- Placebo
- HIM

2005

- Duran Duran
- Iron Maiden
- Black Sabbath
- Velvet Revolver
- Black Label Society
- DragonForce
- Marilyn Manson
- Moby
- Slayer
- Accept
- Candlemass
- Twisted Sister
- Dio
- Anthrax
- The Cure
- Korn

2006:

- Sting
- Roger Waters
- Guns N' Roses
- Depeche Mode
- Placebo
- Twisted Sister
- Crimson Glory
- Moonspell

W.A.S.P. did not perform, due to health problems of lead singer/guitarist Blackie Lawless.

2007:

- Robert Plant & The Strange Sensation
- Chris Cornell
- Europe
- Heaven And Hell
- Dream Theater
- Iced Earth
- Metallica
- Mastodon
- My Dying Bride
- Tool
- Muse
- Manic Street Preachers

2008:

- Iron Maiden
- Judas Priest
- KISS
- Kylie Minogue
- Opeth
- Within Temptation
- Morbid Angel
- Cavalera Conspiracy
- The Offspring
- Patti Smith
- Linkin Park
- Siouxsie
- DEUS
- Marky Ramone
- The Gossip
- Carcass
- Innerwish
- Manu Chao
- Leonard Cohen
- Lenny Kravitz

2009:

- Deep Purple
- The Killers
- Slipknot
- Duffy
- Moby
- Mastodon
- Gogol Bordello
- Linkin Park
- Tokio Hotel

Depeche Mode did not perform, due to health problems of lead singer Dave Gahan.

2010:

- Bob Dylan
- Metallica
- Slayer
- Megadeth
- Anthrax
- Bullet For My Valentine
- Stone Sour
- Suicidal Angels
- Rammstein
- Combichrist
- The Black Eyed Peas
- Massive Attack
- Fatboy Slim
- Faithless
- Gogol Bordello
- Ska-P
- Jethro Tull
- Diana Krall
- Serj Tankian
- Placebo
- Ozzy Osbourne

2011

- Roxette
- Iron Maiden
- Slipknot
- Mastodon
- Gojira
- The Prodigy
- Gogol Bordello
- Kyuss
- Monster Magnet
- Therapy?
- Editors
- Sivert Hoyem
- The Stranglers
- flogging molly
- Dream Theater

2013

- Depeche Mode
- Lana Del Rey (as part of the Rockwave Festival)
- The Subways (as part of the Rockwave Festival)
- Echo & the Bunnymen (as part of the Rockwave Festival)

2015

- The Black Keys
- The Black Angels
- Robbie Williams
- The Prodigy
- Judas Priest
- Rotting Christ
- Black Rebel Motorcycle Club
- Manu Chao
- Black Label Society
- Thirty Seconds to Mars

2016

- The Last Shadow Puppets
- Dropkick Murphys
- Suede
- Lana Del Rey
- Turbonegro
- Allah-alas

2017

- Depeche Mode
- Placebo
- Evanescence
- Gojira
- flogging molly
- Sivert Høyem

2018

- Arctic Monkeys
