= Pavlos Fyssas =

Greek rapper (1979–2013)

Pavlos Fyssas Παύλος Φύσσας
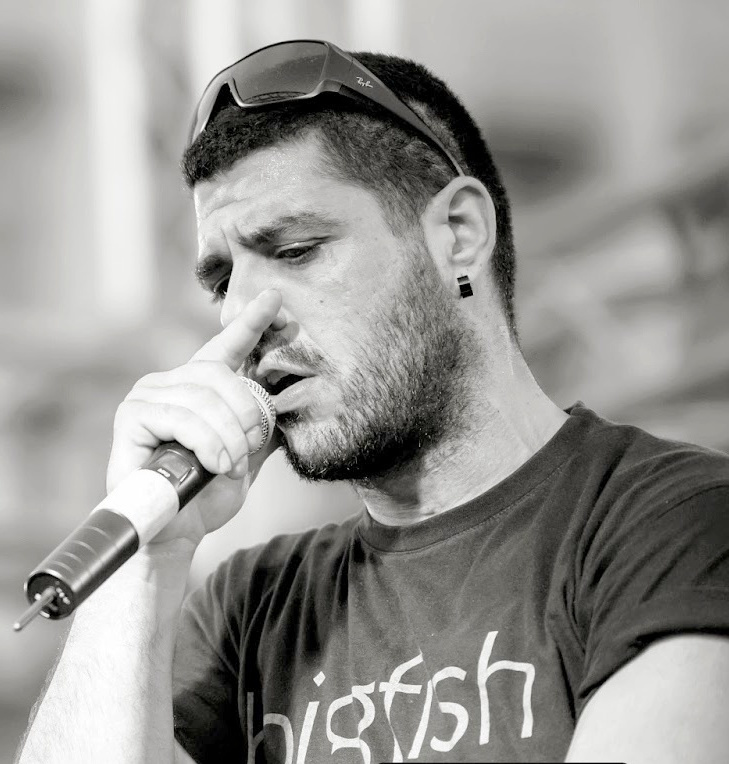
- Pavlos Fyssas giving a performance in 2011.

Background information
- Also known as: Killah P
- Born: Pavlos Fyssas; 10 April 1979; Perama, Piraeus, Greece
- Died: 18 September 2013 (aged 34) Keratsini, Piraeus, Greece
- Genre: Hip-hop
- Occupations: Singer, songwriter, rapper
- Years active: 1997–2013

Pavlos Fyssas (Greek: Παύλος Φύσσας; 10 April 1979 – 18 September 2013), also known by his stage name Killah P, (meaning "Killer of the Past") was a Greek rapper, notable for his participation and performance in musical projects, as well as for his anti-fascist activism. He toured well-known venues in Athens and throughout Greece. He was murdered on 18 September 2013 by a member of the neo-fascist group Golden Dawn.

== Artistic and political activity ==
Fyssas was, along with his father, a member of the Syndicate of Metalworkers of Piraeus (SMP). He had also been an active member of the Greek hip-hop scene since 1997, starting his music career in the Low Bap movement, and later performing alongside big names of the scene.

== Murder ==
On 17 September 2013, Fyssas went out with his partner and 8–10 people to a cafe to watch a football match between Olympiacos and Paris Saint-Germain.

The Hellenic Police received a call at 23:57 the same night, in which the caller stated that a group of 50 people had assembled and were armed with bats, at the intersection of Kefallinias Street and Panagi Tsaldari Avenue in Keratsini. They were reportedly heading towards a cafe called Korali (Coral). At 23:59, a DIAS motorcycle police unit of eight was instructed to enter the area. The police officers reached the cafe, where 30 people were assembled outside, a number of whom started to run towards Tsaldari Avenue, where another group of 60 people had already assembled. There the police officers found Fyssas injured with stab wounds. While still conscious, Fyssas indicated Giorgios Roupakias, who was still on site, as the perpetrator of the attack. Roupakias was then arrested. Fyssas was transported to the General Hospital of Nikea, where his death was confirmed.

Roupakias called the central office of Golden Dawn and spoke with Nikolaos Michaloliakos while the latter was at his residence at the time; this was later confirmed by police.

=== Suspect ===
Giorgios Roupakias worked in the cafeteria of the offices of the neo-fascist political party Golden Dawn. Roupakias was released from pre-trial custody in March 2016 despite having admitted to the murder to a judge after spending the legal maximum time in custody before trial proceedings. He was subsequently required to stay under house arrest except for court appearances, with armed guards keeping him both restricted and protected.

=== Reactions ===
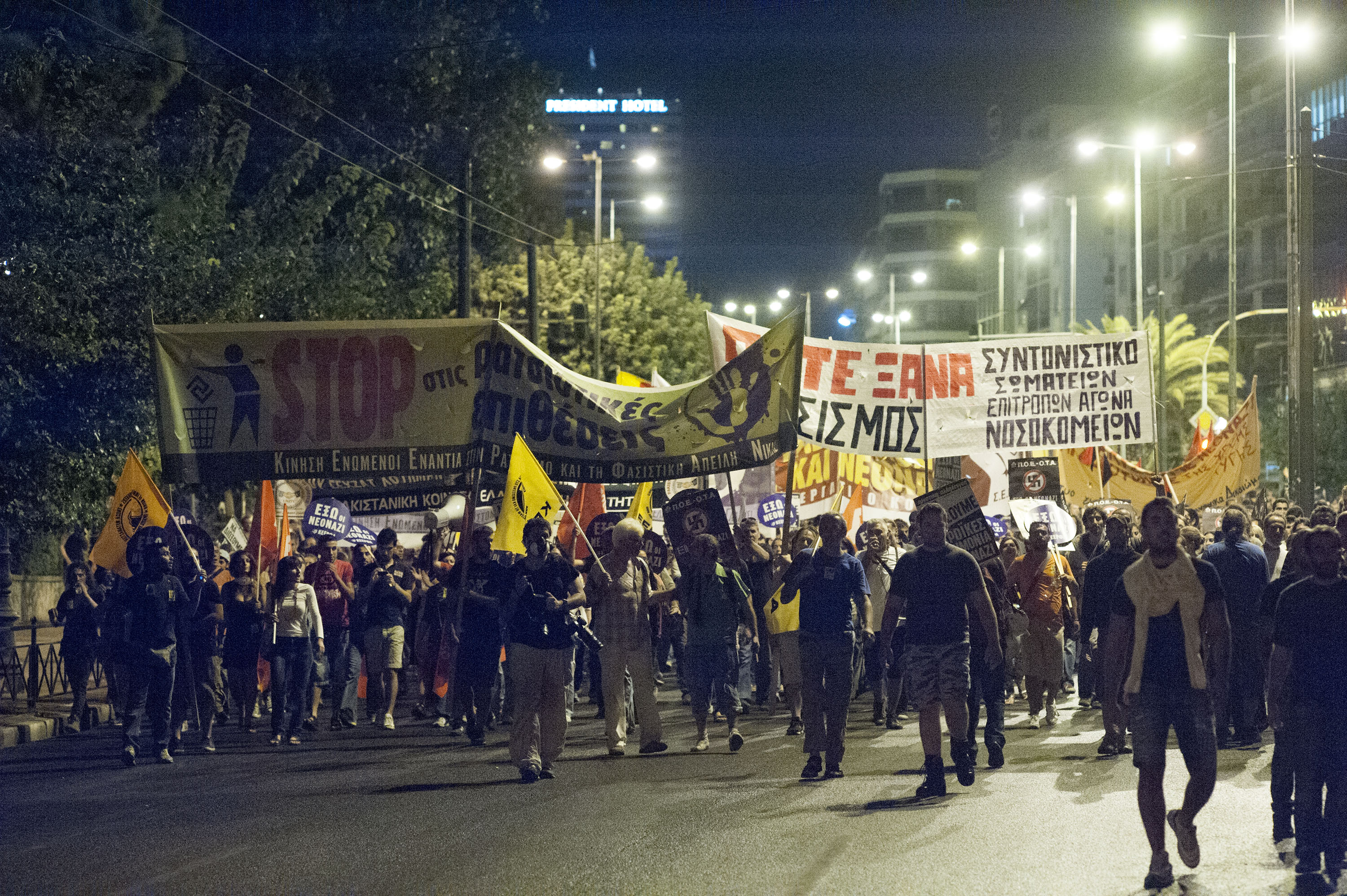
25 September 2013: Demonstration in Athens against Golden Dawn for the murder of Pavlos Fyssas.

The murder was condemned by all parties represented in parliament, including Golden Dawn, which claimed through its MP, Ilias Kasidiaris, that it had no connection to the incident. Fyssas' father stated angrily through a phone call on a television station that his son did not belong to any political faction: "My child did not belong anywhere, they have wrongly politicized him. From the first day we have stated this. They exploit him politically. My child did not belong anywhere."

In a television statement, Prime Minister Antonis Samaras asked for public calm and stated that he will stop "the descendants of the Nazis from poisoning our social life, to act criminally, to terrorize and to undermine the foundations of the country which gave birth to democracy".

Following the incident, protests against Golden Dawn and the associated rise of the far right took place throughout Greece. This included a protest in Athens, attended by 2,500–10,000 people, which marched towards Golden Dawn's central offices a week after the death. The police response to this protest included 34 arrests and reports of one female protester being shot in the face at close range with a tear gas canister. Protests also took place in cities outside Greece, including Barcelona, Brussels, Paris, Amsterdam, London and Nicosia.

Anti-fascist protests staged in Greece turned violent, with police and protesters clashing in Thessaloniki and Athens. Golden Dawn MPs Ilias Kasidiaris, Ilias Panayiotaros and Nikos Michos, who had been accused of acting as intermediaries in the case, were freed after they were not indicted.

On 1 November 2013, a shooting took place at the Golden Dawn's Neo Irakleio offices in Athens. The attack resulted in two members of Golden Dawn, Manolis Kapelonis and Giorgos Fountoulis, being killed with a third injured.

=== Convictions and dismantling of Golden Dawn ===
On 7 October 2020, after five-and-a-half years of investigations, Golden Dawn was declared a criminal organization, with sixty-eight of its members being named as members of a criminal organization and fifteen out of the seventeen party members accused of Pavlos's murder ultimately convicted. The court found Anastasios-Marios Anadiotis, Giorgios Dimou, Elpidoforos Kalaritis, Yoannis Vasilios Komianos, Konstantinos Korkovilis, Anastasios Michalaros, Giorgios Patelis (the secretary of the Nikaia Battalion), Giorgios Skalos, Giorgios Stambelos, Leon Tsalikis, Athanasios Tsorvas, Nikolaos Tsorvas, and Aristotelis Chrisafitis guilty of the murder of Pavlos Fyssas. The court had earlier acknowledged the guilt of Giorgios Roupakias.

== Legacy ==
In 2021, a scientific researcher of the Aristotle University of Thessaloniki, named two newly discovered genres of cyanobacteria, Speos fyssasii and Iphianassa zackieohae, after the murdered activists Pavlos Fyssas and Zak Kostopoulos respectively.

In 2025, a vessel of the Global Sumud Flotilla, an international initiative challenging the blockade of the Gaza Strip, was named Pavlos Fyssas in his memory. The ship was later among those intercepted by Israeli naval forces during the flotilla’s voyage.

== Discography ==
=== As featured performer ===
"Έχω" – Ανδρείκελος – Οι Παλίρροιες Των Χρόνων (The Tides Of Time) (2007)

== Songs ==
"Σιγά μην κλάψω, σιγά μη φοβηθώ" (Won't cry, won't be scared)

"Για το καλό μου" (For my wellbeing)

"Ζόρια" (Stress)

"Εκτός Ελέγχου" (Out of Control/Anthem)

== See also ==
- List of murdered hip hop musicians
- Zak Kostopoulos
- Crime in Greece
