= Toquel =

Albanian-born Greek rapper (born 1994)

- Born: Klaudjo Dhespo; 6 December 1994 (age 31); Tepelenë, Albania
- Occupation: Rapper
- Years active: 2011–present
- Musical career
- Label: Minos EMI

Klaudjo Dhespo (born 6 December 1994), known professionally as Toquel (stylised in all caps), is an Albanian-born Greek rapper.

== Life and career ==
Toquel was born as Klaudjo Dhespo on 6 December 1994 into an Albanian family in the city of Tepelenë, Albania. His family moved to Heraklion, Greece when he was 11 months old.

== Artistry and influences ==
Dhespo's stage name, Toquel, was inspired by a therapist from Chania, Greece, who helped him to manage his panic attacks. He grew up listening to artists such as 50 Cent, Audio Two, Big L, Bone Thugs-n-Harmony, Dr. Dre, Eminem, Mobb Deep, Rakim, Snoop Dogg, The Notorious B.I.G., Tupac and Xzibit.

== Discography ==
=== Studio albums ===
List of studio albums, with selected chart positions
Title	Details	Peak chart positions
Title	Details	GRE
Ligo Parapano	Released: 22 July 2015; Label: Minos EMI, Universal; Formats: Digital download, streaming	—
777	Released: 27 May 2019; Label: Minos EMI, Universal; Formats: Digital download, streaming, LP	1
Beverly Hills	Released: 27 May 2022; Label: Minos EMI, Universal; Formats: Digital download, streaming, LP	19
1111	Released: 9 November 2023; Label: Minos EMI, Universal; Formats: Digital download, streaming, LP	23
Ilegal (with Fly Lo and Beyond)	Released: 28 November 2024; Label: Minos EMI, Universal; Formats: Digital download, streaming	—
10	Released: 12 March 2026; Label: Minos EMI, Universal; Formats: Digital download, streaming	—
"—" denotes a recording that did not chart or was not released in that territory.

=== Singles ===
==== As lead artist ====
List of singles as lead artist, with selected chart positions and certifications
Title	Year	Peak chart positions		Certifications	Album
Title	Year	GRE	ALB	Certifications	Album
"Karolina"	2018	—	100	—N/a	Non-album singles
"Playboy"	2018	—	70	—N/a	Non-album singles
"THL" (featuring Mad Clip)	2019	—	—	—N/a	Non-album singles
"777"	2019	—	—	IFPI GRE: 4× Platinum	777
"Stars" (featuring Light)	2019	1	—	IFPI GRE: Diamond	777
"Pistoli" (with Sin Laurent)	2020	1	—	—N/a	Non-album singles
"Fendi" (with Dirty Harry and Ortiz)	2020	—	—	—N/a	Non-album singles
"Diamantia" (with Sin Laurent)	2021	—	—	—N/a	Non-album singles
"Kokaina"	2021	1	—	IFPI GRE: Diamond	Non-album singles
"Rollie"	2021	10	—	IFPI GRE: Gold	Non-album singles
"Wet" (with Snik, MG and GameBoy)	2021	1	—	IFPI GRE: 4× Platinum	Non-album singles
"Aftoktonia" (with Rack)	2021	2	—	IFPI GRE: 4× Platinum	Non-album singles
"Beverly Hills"	2022	2	—	IFPI GRE: Diamond	Beverly Hills
"Forema" (with Roi 6/12)	2022	2	—	IFPI GRE: Platinum	Non-album single
"Prosopika Freestyle" (with Beyond)	2023	8	—	IFPI GRE: 2× Platinum	1111
"Mina Ögon/Ta matia moy" (with Nineb Youk and Jo Lids)	2023	8	—	IFPI GRE: 2× Platinum	Två världar
"Monroe" (with Hawk and Baghdad)	2023	1	—	IFPI GRE: 4× Platinum	Metal Slang
"G63" (with Bloody Hawk)	2023	1	—	IFPI GRE: Diamond	1111
"OAED" (with Snik and Voyage, featuring Ivan Greko and BeTaf Beats)	2024	1	—	IFPI GRE: 3× Platinum	Non-album singles
"Success Freestyle" (with Ioannis)	2024	1	—	IFPI GRE: Platinum	Non-album singles
"Carvajal" (with Ioannis)	2024	3	—	IFPI GRE: 3× Platinum	Non-album singles
"Trap" (with Fly Lo and Baghdad)	2024	5	—	IFPI GRE: 3× Platinum	Non-album singles
"MCMG" (with Fly Lo)	2025	1	—	IFPI GRE: 2× Platinum	Non-album singles
"Kako" (with ObieDaz)	2025	1	—	IFPI GRE: 4× Platinum	Non-album singles
"Prezi" (with Fly Lo and Mike G)	2025	1	—	IFPI GRE: 2× Platinum	Non-album singles
"—" denotes a recording that did not chart or was not released in that territory.

==== As featured artist ====
List of singles as featured artist, with selected chart positions
Title	Year	Peak chart positions		Certifications	Album
Title	Year	GRE	ALB	Certifications	Album
"Poppa Bottle" (Adriano featuring Toquel)	2017	—	2	—N/a	Non-album single
"Mf" (Snik featuring Toquel)	2024	4	—	IFPI GRE: Gold	Topboy 2
"Pano" (Bloody Hawk featuring Toquel)	2024	2	—	IFPI GRE: Diamond	Fthina Tricks 2
"Ma Bella" (Rack featuring Toquel and Beyond)	2024	1	—	IFPI GRE: Diamond	Ego Therapy
"Mob" (Strat featuring Toquel)	2025	9	—	IFPI GRE: Gold	Guarantee
"Aeroplana" (Bloody Hawk featuring Toquel)	2025	1	—	IFPI GRE: Diamond	Fthina Tricks 3
"Kalo koritsi" (Fy featuring Toquel and BLVD)	2025	10	—	IFPI GRE: Gold	O xoros tou Fy
"YG" (Fly Lo and BLVD featuring Toquel)	2026	4	—	IFPI GRE: Platinum	Veganze
"—" denotes a recording that did not chart or was not released in that territory.

=== Other charted songs ===
List of other charted songs, with selected chart positions and certifications
Title	Year	Peak chart positions	Certifications	Album
Title	Year	GRE	Certifications	Album
"Sandra"	2019	5	IFPI GRE: Diamond	777
"Kolasi"	2019	9	IFPI GRE: 4× Platinum	777
"Skoni"	2022	10	IFPI GRE: Diamond	Beverly Hills
"Kokkina Matia" (with For3al and Beyond)	2022	3	IFPI GRE: 2× Platinum	Beverly Hills
"Platina" (with Sin Laurent)	2022	6	IFPI GRE: Diamond	Beverly Hills
"Panorama" (with Sin Laurent)	2022	2	IFPI GRE: 4× Platinum	Beverly Hills
"Moneydance" (with Sin Laurent and Beyond)	2022	9	IFPI GRE: Platinum	Beverly Hills
"Palmous" (with Sidarta and Beyond)	2022	15	IFPI GRE: Diamond	Beverly Hills
"Allou" (with Lila and Beyond)	2023	1	IFPI GRE: Diamond	1111
"3:15"	2023	1	IFPI GRE: Diamond	1111
"Zurbaran"	2023	4	IFPI GRE: Diamond	1111
"Ghetto" (with Fly Lo and Beyond)	2023	3	IFPI GRE: 2× Platinum	1111
"Fake Love" (with Rack and Beyond)	2023	6	IFPI GRE: 2× Platinum	1111
"Asfaltos" (with Beyond)	2023	8	IFPI GRE: Platinum	1111
"Drive By" (with Beyond)	2023	13	IFPI GRE: Platinum	1111
"Ferma" (with Roran and Beyond)	2023	12	IFPI GRE: Gold	1111
"Ilegal" (with Fly Lo and Beyond)	2024	2	IFPI GRE: Diamond	Ilegal
"Dolce Gabbana" (with Fly Lo and Beyond)	2024	1	IFPI GRE: Diamond	Ilegal
"Glock 26" (with Fly Lo and Beyond)	2024	6	IFPI GRE: 2× Platinum	Ilegal
"Peligrosa" (with Fly Lo and Beyond)	2024	8	IFPI GRE: 4× Platinum	Ilegal
"Odigao stin vroxi" (with Fly Lo and Beyond)	2024	10	IFPI GRE: 3× Platinum	Ilegal
"Mou zitas" (with Fly Lo and Beyond)	2024	6	IFPI GRE: Diamond	Ilegal
"Mia wraia mera stin athina" (with Fly Lo and Beyond)	2024	11	IFPI GRE: Platinum	Ilegal
"Vroxi"	2026	6	IFPI GRE: Platinum	10
"Eilikrina" (with Beyond)	2026	8	IFPI GRE: Platinum	10
"Poios na sou to pei" (with Lila and Beyond)	2026	1	IFPI GRE: Diamond	10
"ChatGPT"	2026	2	IFPI GRE: 2× Platinum	10
"Feggaraki" (with Beyond)	2026	5	IFPI GRE: Platinum	10
"Geitonia"	2026	9	IFPI GRE: Platinum	10
"€€€" (with Fly Lo and Beyond)	2026	2	IFPI GRE: 4× Platinum	10
"Kakos gia sena" (with Beyond)	2026	3	IFPI GRE: 3× Platinum	10
"Xapia" (with Beyond)	2026	10	IFPI GRE: Platinum	10
"10"	2026	7	IFPI GRE: Platinum	10
"Showtime"	2026	21	IFPI GRE: Gold	10 (Part 2)
"Xeria kathara" (with Beyond)	2026	16	IFPI GRE: Gold	10 (Part 2)
"More puta" (with Rack and Beyond)	2026	13	IFPI GRE: Platinum	10 (Part 2)
"A$$ap" (with ObieDaz)	2026	8	IFPI GRE: Platinum	10 (Part 2)
"Anasa" (with BoyPanda)	2026	17	IFPI GRE: Platinum	10 (Part 2)
"Ximeroma" (with Saske and Beyond)	2026	2	IFPI GRE: 2× Platinum	10 (Part 2)
"Kamia" (with Beyond)	2026	10	IFPI GRE: Platinum	10 (Part 2)
"Geitonia kai tilefono" (with Bloody Hawk and Beyond)	2026	2	IFPI GRE: 2× Platinum	10 (Part 2)
"Gia mena" (with BoyPanda)	2026	19	—N/a	10 (Part 2)
"Vace Zela"	2026	7	IFPI GRE: 2× Platinum	10 (Part 2)
"—" denotes a recording that did not chart or was not released in that territory.
