= Lex (rapper) =

Greek rapper (born 1984)

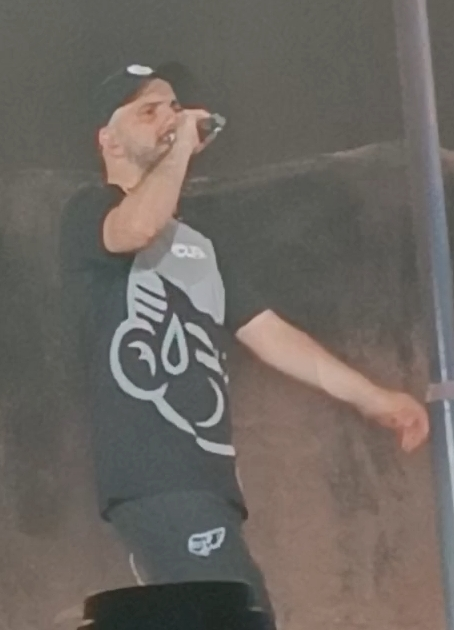
- Lex in his concert in the Athens Olympic Sports Complex (June 2025)

Background information
- Born: Alexis Lanaras; September 25, 1984 (age 42); Thessaloniki, Greece
- Genres: Greek hip-hop; rap
- Instrument: Voice
- Works: Discography
- Years active: 1999–present
- Label: Stay Independent
- Formerly of: Voreia Asteria; Anapoda Kapela

Alexis Lanaras (Greek: Αλέξης Λαναράς; born September 25, 1984), known professionally as Lex, is a Greek rapper from Thessaloniki and ex-member of the Greek hip-hop bands Voreia Asteria and Anapoda Kapela.

== Biography ==
Lex has kept a lot of information about his personal life private. He was born in Faliro, Thessaloniki, on September 25, 1984, and comes from Galatista, Chalkidiki. He started off as a graffiti artist with his crew, 2G (Golden Globes or Good Guys), consisting of Mikros Kleftis, Jamal, Zenon, and Mondi, with whom he formed the hip-hop band Voreia Asteria in 1999. In 2003, they released their first album, Xalara. The next year, they released their second album, titled Xalarotera. While still a member of Voreia Asteria, he co-founded the rap duo Anapoda Kapela with fellow Voreia Asteria member Mikros Kleftis in 2007. They went on to release 2 albums: Den Mas Kses Kala (2007) and Film Noir (2012).

In 2010, Lex started his solo rap career. His first studio album, Tapeinoi kai Peinasmenoi (Humble and Hungry), was released in 2014. With little promotion, the album was very successful and its lyrics were described as "raw and unfiltered". Its main themes are the depressing life in urban areas, as well as economic problems during the Greek Crisis.

Lex received widespread attention with the release of his second album, 2XXX, in 2018. The album was produced by his producing partner Dof Twogee. 2XXX was certified Diamond. In 2019, after several sold-out live events, he performed a concert in Athens that counted 10,000 attendees.

His third album, Metro, was released in 2022. Metro, produced by Dof Twogee, Beats Pliz, Night Grind, Ortiz, and Solid, is about the rapper's view on everyday life. The album was a critical and commercial success and was certified 2x Platinum, leading to a concert in Athens with 30,000 attendees.

In 2024, G.T.K. (acronym for Gia tin Koultoura, For the Culture), was released. The album was produced by Dof Twogee and Ortiz, and features the Italian rapper Guè. In the track "Xeiroteri Genia" (Worst Generation), he samples journalist Aris Portosalte's controversial reaction to Lex's concert in Nea Smyrni with 20.000 attendees in 2022. The album was positively reviewed. In 2025, the rapper performed two back-to-back concerts in the Athens Olympic Sports Complex (OACA). The first show was sold-out in less than 24 hours, gathering 60,000 people. A second concert was later announced, set to take place in OACA the day after the first concert. The second concert brought in 40,000 people, with both concerts combined surpassing 100.000 attendees. The first concert set the record for the biggest rap concert of all time in Greece, surpassing Bloody Hawk's concert in OACA just a week earlier with 45,000 attendees.

== Discography ==
=== Albums ===
| Year | Title | Notes |
|---|---|---|
| 2002 | Xalara | with Voreia Asteria |
| 2004 | Xalarotera | with Voreia Asteria |
| 2007 | De Mas Kses Kala | with Anapoda Kapela |
| 2010 | Ta Afthentika Tis Polis | with Voreia Asteria |
| 2010 | 5 Asteron | with Voreia Asteria |
| 2012 | Film Noir | with Anapoda Kapela |
| 2014 | Tapeinoi kai Peinasmenoi | Solo |
| 2018 | 2XXX | Solo |
| 2022 | Metro | Solo |
| 2024 | G.T.K. | Solo |
| 2026 | MPASTARD0S | Solo |

=== Singles ===
| Year | Title | Notes |
|---|---|---|
| 2015 | "Matomeni Triti (Freestyle)" | |
| 2016 | "Paidia tou Pagetou" | with Asto Pasam |
| 2019 | "Tipota ston Kosmo" | |
| 2019 | "Oxi Simera" | with Ortiz |
| 2020 | "Varane" | with Dof Twogee |
| 2022 | "Epiloges (Prod. by Skive) | with Hgemonas, Skive |
