= Bloody Hawk =

- Born: Nikolaos Kitsos; November 4, 1995 (age 31); Xanthi, Greece
- Genres: Rap, Greek hip-hop
- Occupations: Rapper, singer, songwriter

Nikolaos Kitsos (Greek: Νικόλαος Κίτσος; born 4 November 1995), known professionally as Bloody Hawk, is a Greek rapper, singer and songwriter from Xanthi. He gained early recognition through his independent releases, including the EP Nistikos (2015) and the albums Vals (2014) and Signore Falco (2015), which established him as a prominent figure in the Greek hip-hop scene.

== Life and career ==
Kitsos was born in Xanthi on November 4, 1995. He began uploading videos to YouTube in 2013. At 16, he formed the rap group Ftheromai with Spave, Epel, and Nimbus D. He began releasing solo albums in 2012.

Bloody Hawk released his first studio album, Komplexiko, on May 14, 2017. The album, produced by Trouf and consisting of ten songs, received millions of listens. "Anagki Na Se Do", "Komplexiko", and "Dachtylidi" were the album's most successful tracks.

On September 11, 2019, he released his second studio album, 1 Evro. It consists of ten tracks and was produced by Chico Beatz, Trouf, Beef95, and Mateos Nps.

After signing a contract with the record label Minos EMI, Bloody Hawk released his third studio album, Timima, on November 19, 2021. The album consists of ten tracks and was produced by Mateos Nps and Beats Pliz.

On May 18, 2023, he released his fourth studio album, Fthina Tricks, the first of a trilogy. The album includes 12 songs and features other Greek rappers and trappers, including Dani Gambino, Immune, Vlospa, and Wang.

After their collaborations in previous songs, Bloody Hawk, Dani Gambino, and Wang released an EP titled The Deal on March 7, 2024. It consists of five tracks and was produced by Mateos Nps.

The second album of the Fthina Tricks trilogy, Fthina Tricks 2, was released on May 30, 2024, with 12 tracks. It featured Toquel, Wang, Dani Gambino, Ethismos, and Fann. It was produced by Mateos Nps, Ortiz, Beats Pliz, NightGrind, RigasBeats, and Docent.

On May 29, 2025, Bloody released Fthina Tricks 3, the final installment in the trilogy. The album has 12 songs and features Toquel, Lex, Dani Gambino, Wang, Marina Satti, and Trouf. It was produced by Beats Pliz, Mateos Nps, Aggelina, Ortiz, Marvin Zidane, Oge, Nikos Kodonas, Docent, Kemakid, and Pikie Cans.

== Documentary film ==
Emeis: Mia Tainia gia ton Bloody Hawk (Greek: Εμείς: Μια Ταινία για τον Bloody Hawk) is a 2025 Greek music documentary film about Bloody Hawk. The film was directed by Orestis Plakias and Stelios Kotionis and written by Fedra Vokali and Kostis Theodosopoulos. It was released in Greek theatres on April 10, 2025.

== Discography ==
=== Studio albums ===
- Komplexiko (2017)
- 1 Evro (2019)
- Timima (2021)
- Fthina Tricks (2023)
- Fthina Tricks 2 (2024)
- Fthina Tricks 3 (2025)

=== Singles ===
- "Tha Ta Katafero" (2018)
- "Ftanoume" (2018)
- "Diko Sas" (2018)
- "Miami" (2019)
- "Toronto" (2020)
- "Iroes" (2020)
- "2010 Freestyle" (2021)
- "Al Dente" (2021)
- "Daewoo 3" (2021)
- "Daimones" (2022)
- "Nyxta" (2022)
- "Standby" (2022)
- "Miami 2" (2022)
- "90 BPM PACK" (2022)
- "Hater" (2022)
- "Louloudi" (2022)
- "Ton Kosmo Girizo" (2023)
- "G63" (2023)
- "GIA TI FANELA" (2024)
