= Alvaro Lojacono =

Italian terrorist (born 1955)

- Born: 7 May 1955; Milan, Italy
- Other names: Otello; Varo
- Organization(s): Autonomia Operaia; Red Brigades
- Known for: Murders; Acts of terrorism
- Movement: Communism
- Opponent: Neofascists; Italian state
- Criminal charges: Assassination of student Mikis Mantakas; Armed attack on Aldo Moro's escort numerous murders, kidnappings, and counts of armed robbery
- Criminal penalty: Life imprisonment in Italy; Seventeen years imprisonment in Switzerland

Alvaro Lojacono (born 7 May 1955) is an Italian former communist militant and terrorist.

== Early life ==
Lojacono was born in Milan, Italy on 7 May 1955 to parents doctor Giuseppe Lojacono, a Communist Party member, and Ornella Baragiola, a Swiss citizen.

When he was three years old, Lojacono's family moved to Rome, where he entered the Swiss elementary school of the city. In 1960, his parents separated without a divorce. He followed, along with his sister Silvana, their mother first to Ticino, then to Savosa, and eventually to Rimini, where Ornella Baragiola worked as the manager of the Italian-Swiss cultural center. After being ejected from Florence's Castelnuovo scientific high school, Lojacono returned to his father in Rome and enrolled in an arts school, where he became engaged in left-wing activism.

== Armed militancy ==
Lojacono soon gravitated towards the radical-left, autonomist organization Autonomia Operaia ("Workers' Autonomy") that, besides engaging in violent political activism, maintained a clandestine, armed wing, unofficially denoted as Autonomia Armata ("Armed Autonomy").

On 28 February 1975, the trial began in Rome of members of the extreme-left organization Potere Operaio, accused for the arson attack against the home of MSI undersecretary Mario Mattei and his family on Primavalle street, which resulted in the death of two of his children and the serious injury of two other persons.

Throughout the trial, there were continuous, severe, and violent clashes around the court area and elsewhere in the streets of Rome between right-wing and left-wing radicals. In a riot outside the MSI headquarters in Ottaviano street, shots were fired killing the Greek medical student and neofascist sympathizer Mikis Mantakas. The police investigation of the crime resulted in the indictment of two left-wing militants known to the police, one of whom was Alvaro Lojacono. (Note: The other defendant was Potere Operaio militant Fabrizio Panzieri. He was also sentenced to sixteen years imprisonment but was set free pending his appeal and vanished. He remains a fugitive with unknown whereabouts. See Paoletti (2019).) In the first trial, Lojacono was acquitted for lack of evidence, but, on appeal in 1980, he was found guilty and sentenced to 16 years in prison. He appealed the sentence to Italy's Supreme Court, and was released from jail while the appeal was pending.

In 1981, he went underground and became a wanted man. While Lojacono was in hiding, the judiciary investigation uncovered additional aspects of his past. Lojacono had become, since 1977, a member of the "Roman column" of the Brigate Rosse through the recommendation of his friend and Brigades gunman Valerio Morucci.

He was identified as a participant in the murder of 14 persons, in two kidnappings and in one armed robbery.

== Trials in Italy ==
An official indictment was issued in 1981 against him, and fifty-six other defendants, for the kidnapping of the Christian Democrat councilor Ciro Cirillo. He was also indicted in 1982 for the murder of the Campania regional councilor Raffaele Delcogliano. The same year, the Ministry of the Interior named Lojacono among the nine most wanted members of the Red Brigades.

He was tried in absentia for the 1978 murder of magistrate Girolamo Tartaglione; for the 1979 murder of two public security officers during the Red Brigades' armed assault on the Rome offices of the Christian Democratic Party; the murder of colonel Antonio Varisco and Marshal Mariano Romiti, both of the Carabinieri; and for the 1980 armed robbery at the Ministry of Communications. He was sentenced to life imprisonment.

He was finally accused of participating in the 1978 kidnapping and assassination of Aldo Moro, Christian Democrat leader and supporter of the "historic compromise" between his party and the Communists.

The indictment described Lojacono as being present on 16 March 1978 in Fani street, at the site of the Red Brigades attack against the Moro column of cars, firing at Moro's guards and taking the politician in a Brigades hiding place.

== Fugitive ==
Lojacono fled to Algeria in 1981, following, as he claimed many years later, the advice of his father who had been a supporter and friend of Algerian independence movement militants, while also asserting that he was indirectly helped by the Italian Communist Party. The latter assertion was firmly rejected by the Communist leadership and by political columnists.

After sporadic sightings in France and Brazil, his traces are lost until 1986, when he moves into his maternal residence, Villa Orizzonte, in Castelrotto, Switzerland, nested on the Alto Malcantone hills with a large private park along with three thousand square meters of vineyard. Under the threat of an international arrest warrant issued by the Italian authorities, he immediately applies for Swiss citizenship, an application based on his mother's nationality. A 1985 legislation that grants citizenship automatically to applicants who were born after 1953 and have at least one Swiss parent allows Lojacono to become in 1986 a Swiss citizen.

In December of the same year, he applies for a name change, and, with the authorities' approval, he becomes Alvaro Baragiola.

After a few years away from the public eye, he resurfaces as a games & quizzes host on the Italian-Swiss Radio, under the moniker Capitan Zarro.

== Trials in Switzerland ==
In 1989, the Lugano criminal court sentenced Locajono to life imprisonment for the 1978 murder of the Italian judge Girolamo Tartaglione, a sentence subsequently reduced to 17 years of imprisonment. A legal process against him for his participation in the assassination of Aldo Moro was closed due to "lack of evidence," since there were no Italian witnesses coming forth to testify in Switzerland.

After nine years of detention, in 1997, Baragiola was granted work release, which he used to follow a journalism course. In October 1999, he was released unconditionally.

On the basis of the international arrest warrant issued by Italy, he was arrested by the French authorities in 2000 while vacationing in Corsica. France refused to extradite him to Italy, since his conviction in absentia was not recognized under French law, and Lojacono was allowed to return freely to Switzerland.

== Swiss extradition law change attempt ==
In 2019, the Ticino League party submitted a proposal to change the law under which Lojacono cannot be extradited to Italy, although, according to the Federal Office of Justice, Italy never submitted an extradition request to the Swiss authorities. The proposal came amidst the news that Bolivia extradited to Italy Proletari Armati per il Comunismo terrorist Cesare Battisti and that Italian Interior Minister Matteo Salvini declared that all terrorists living abroad would be put behind bars in Italy.

In interviews given to Swiss and Italian media, Lojacono indicated that he would "not oppose" his extradition to Italy.

== See also ==
- Years of lead
