= Low bap =

Music genre

- Stylistic origins: Hip hop music
- Cultural origins: 1990s, Greece

Low bap is a subgenre of the Greek hip hop music scene that emerged in the mid-1990s as the sound of the prominent Greek hip hop group Active Member. It is characterized by slower tempo and rapping than usual, often combined with lyrics with sociopolitical content. The words "low bap" is derived from the boom bap hip hop subgenre from the East Coast of the United States. Cinematic attempts, concerts, and festivals have also taken place in an effort to broaden the scope of the movement, and introduce new bands to the genre's range of followers.

Low bap has its beginnings in Perama, an industrial suburb of Piraeus in Athens Urban Area.

== Origin ==
In June 1992, during a live performance of Public Enemy in Nikaia, B. D. Foxmoor and MCD met each other and created one of the first Greek hip hop groups, Active Member. In 1995, hip hop music was not well known in Greece. Active Member attracted big discographic companies and signed up with the consortium Warner (Warner Music Group). A few months later, the third album of Active Member was produced, under the name To Megalo Kolpo (The Great Wangle), and became widely known. On that album, Active Member decided to rename hip hop as they had taken it in, thus naming it "low bap."
