= Active Member =

Greek hip hop group

- Origin: Perama, Greater Athens, Greece
- Genres: Low bap
- Years active: 1992–present
- Labels: Warner, 8ctagon, Imantas
- Members: B.D. Foxmoor; Λόγος Έργου Σκιά aka Ramon leskaramon
- Past members: DJ Booker; DJ MCD; Real D Xray; DJ Smartie Al; Sadahzinia

Active Member is a Greek hip-hop/low bap group, founded in 1992 by Michalis Mitakidis (a.k.a. B.D. Foxmoor) and Dimitris Kritikos (a.k.a. DJ MCD).

== History ==
=== History ===
In June 1992, B.D. Foxmoor (Michael Mytakidis) met DJ MCD (Dimitris Kritikos) at a Public Enemy concert, and then founded Active Member, and released their first album in 1993; a second album followed in 1994.

== Freestyle productions ==
In 1996 they released their fourth, and in 1998 their fifth album. From 1996 until the end of 1999, Freestyle Productions had released three album collections, two personal albums of members of the Active Member, a tray for DJs and five other low bap works. Some of them were independent productions, and some were released in conjunction with Warner Music and EMI. At the same time, the company maintained a radio broadcast to a large Athenian station.

== Members ==
Current members

- B.D. Foxmoor (1992–present)
- lesakaramon (2022–present)

Past members

- DJ MCD (1992–1996)
- X-Ray (1993–2002)
- Real-D (1993–1997)
- DJ Booker (2002–2006)
- Sadahzinia (2004–2022)

== Discography ==
LPs

1. Diamartyria (Protest) (Freestyle Productions, LP 1993)
2. Stin Ora Ton Skion (In the Hour of the Shadows) (Freestyle Productions, LP, 1994)
3. To Megalo Kolpo (The Big Game) (Warner, CD/LP, 1995)
4. Apo Ton Topo Tis Fygis (From Run Away Land) (Warner, CD/2LP, 1996
5. Mythoi Tou Valtou (Myths from the Moor) (Warner, CD/2LP, 1998)
6. Meres Paraxenes, Thavmasies Meres (Weird Days, Beautiful Days) (Warner, CD, 2000)
7. Live/Remix (Warner, 2CD, 2000)
8. Ston Kairo tou Allokotou Fovou (In Times of Weird Fear) (Warner, CD/2LP, 2001)
9. Perasma sto akroneiro (Passage to the Edge of a Dream) (Warner, CD, 2002)
10. Fiera (Warner, CD, 2004)
11. Ap' to Megalo Kolpo sti Fiera (From Big Game to Fiera) (Warner, CD, 2005)
12. Blah-Blasphemy (8ctagon, CD+DVD, 2005)
13. Klassika ki agapimena (live hxografisi apo no sponsors jam) (CD, 2007)
14. Skieratsa (Shadow-race) [including: Blah-Blasphemy 2, Bathiskiota (Deep Shadowed), Apnoia (Calm) (8ctagon, 3CD, 2006)
15. Ap'tis ftiaxis mas ta lathia ( Ep1, Ep2, Ep3, diplo CD kai DVD, apli kai syllektiki ekdosi) (8ctagon, 2009)
16. Ston vouvon tin eschatia (At the extreme end of the mutes) (Imantas, CD, 2011)
17. Arsenali (simple edition) (Imantas, 2CD, 2012)
18. Cosmos Alivas (Self-released, 2LP, 2014)
19. Zaliki (Talkback, 2CD, 2017)
20. Friktoria (Talkback, 2020)

CD singles

1. Akou Mana (Listen Up, Mother) (Warner, promo maxi 12",1995)
2. Prosfigas (Refugee) (Warner, promo maxi 12",1996)
3. Gia Ta Aderfia Pou Hathikane Noris (Dedicated to the Lost Brothers) (Warner, CD single, 1997)
4. 2/12/2002 (Warner, CD single, 2002)
5. Hreose ta sti fotia/Hreose ta ki afta sti fotia (7" vinyl, 2007)
6. Fysaei kontra (7" vinyl, 2008)
