= La notte della Repubblica =

- Also known as: The Night of the Republic
- Presented by: Sergio Zavoli
- Composer: Gianni Marchetti
- Country of origin: Italy
- Original language: Italian
- No. of series: 1
- No. of episodes: 18

Production
- Production locations: RAI production centre, Rome, Italy
- Running time: 120 minutes

Original release
- Network: Rai 2
- Release: December 12, 1989 – April 11, 1990

La notte della Repubblica (The Night of the Republic) is a television programme presented by Sergio Zavoli, broadcast by the Italian public television channel Rai 2. The programme ran from 12 December 1989 (20th anniversary of Piazza Fontana bombing) to 11 April 1990; the first episode was broadcast on Tuesday, second on Monday, while other episodes were aired every Wednesday evening.

The programme told of Italy during the Years of Lead, with movies, interviews with some protagonists of the period and final discussion.

In 1992, the material broadcast on television was transcribed in the book La notte della Repubblica.

== Episodes ==
Date	Number	Theme	Interviewees	Guests
December 12, 1989	1	Piazza Fontana bombing	Corrado Stajano (journalist), Pietro Valpreda (anarchist)	Salvo Andò (PSI parliamentary representative in 1989), Aldo Aniasi (Mayor of Milan from 1967 to 1976), Guido Calvi (criminal lawyer), Mario Capanna (leader of Movimento Studentesco in 1969), Pietro Calogero (Judge of Treviso in 1969), Giuseppe Gargani (DC parliamentary representative in 1989), Libero Gualtieri (PRI parliamentary representative in 1989), Franco Servello (MSI parliamentary representative in 1989), Luciano Violante (PCI parliamentary representative in 1989)
December 18, 1989	2	1960s in Italy	Stefano Delle Chiaie (founder of National Vanguard)	Tina Anselmi (politician), Umberto Cappuzzo (former policeman and politician), Federico Umberto D'Amato (former Italian secret agent), Luciano Lama (syndicalist in the 1960s), Giacomo Mancini (politician), Pino Rauti (founder of Ordine Nuovo), Massimo Teodori (Italian author and politician)
December 27, 1989	3	1968 movement in Italy and the Hot Autumn	Mario Capanna (political leader during the protests), Giampiero Mughini (journalist)	Giorgio Benvenuto (politician and syndicalist), Marco Boato (Lotta Continua militant in 1969–73), Margherita Boniver (PSI parliamentary representative in 1989), Guido Carli (banker, economist and politician), Bartolo Ciccardini (DC parliamentary representative in 1989), Carlo Donat-Cattin (politician), Giuseppe Glisenti (President of Finmeccanica in 1989), Claudio Petruccioli (journalist and politician), Giorgio Pisanò (MSI parliamentary representative in 1989)
January 3, 1990	4	Birth of the Red Brigades (Brigate Rosse; BR)	Alfredo Bonavita (member of BR)	Sabino Acquaviva (sociologist), Piero Bassetti (politician), Gian Carlo Caselli (Judge of Turin), Lucio Colletti (philosopher), Giorgio Galli (political expert), Sergio Garavini (politician), Ugo Intini (journalist and politician), Giuseppe Leoni (manager of Sit-Siemens in 1970), Libero Mazza (Prefect of Milan from 1966 to 1974), Aldo Natoli (politician), Mario Segni (politician), Ersilio Tonini (Archbishop of Ravenna-Cervia in 1990), Guido Viola (Judge of Milan in the 1970s)
January 10, 1990	5	Armed propaganda	some members of BR	
January 17, 1990	6	Golpe Borghese and neo-fascist subversion	Antonio Labruna (former Italian secret agent), Amos Spiazzi (Italian Army General)	Salvo Andò (PSI parliamentary representative in 1990), Michele Coiro (Judge of Rome), Massimo De Carolis (member of DC in the 1970s), Franco Ferraresi (sociologist), Alfredo Pazzaglia (MSI parliamentary representative in 1990), Mariano Rumor (Italian Prime Minister in 1970), Luciano Violante (Judge of Turin in the 1970s), Claudio Vitalone (Judge of Rome in the 1970s)
January 24, 1990	7	Attack against Judiciary	Alberto Franceschini (member of BR), Mario Sossi (Judge kidnapped by BR)	Paolo Barile (jurist and lawyer), Adolfo Beria di Argentine (jurist), Alfredo Biondi (politician and lawyer), Gian Carlo Caselli (Judge of Turin), Fulvio Cerofolini (politician and syndicalist), Fernanda Contri (lawyer), Giovanni Leone (President of Italy from 1971 to 1978), Francesco Meloni (Judge of Genoa), Claudio Vitalone (Judge of Rome in the 1970s)
January 31, 1990	8	Piazza della Loggia and Italicus bombing	Vincenzo Vinciguerra (neo-fascist activist)	Pier Ferdinando Casini (DC parliamentary representative in 1990), Franco Castrezzati (syndicalist), Ottaviano Del Turco (syndicalist), Franco Ferraresi (sociologist), Libero Gualtieri (PRI parliamentary representative in 1990), Umberto Improta (Police officer), Ignazio La Russa (member of MSI in 1990), Rosario Minna (Judge of Milan in the 1970s), Pierluigi Onorato (politician), Aldo Tortorella (PCI parliamentary representative in 1990), Ambrogio Viviani (former Head of counterintelligence)
February 7, 1990	9	1974–77 in Italy	Enrico Fenzi (member of BR)	Nicolò Amato (Judge of Rome in the 1970s), Luigi Covatta (politician), Mario Gozzini (politician), Sergio Lenci (architect), Stefano Rodotà (jurist and politician), Oscar Luigi Scalfaro (politician), Egidio Sterpa (PLI parliamentary representative in 1990), Raffaele Valensise (politician and lawyer)
February 14, 1990	10	Movement of 1977	Antonio Negri (sociologist and political philosopher)	Sabino Acquaviva (sociologist), Roberto Formigoni (founder of the Popular Movement), Tommaso Mancini (criminal lawyer), Aldo Natoli (politician), Luciano Lama (politician and syndicalist), Nicolò Lipari (politician), Franco Piro (politician), Alberto Ronchey (journalist), Nicola Tranfaglia (historian), Angelo Ventura (sociologist), Emilio Vesce (politician)
February 21, 1990	11	Kidnapping of Aldo Moro – Part 1	Franco Bonisoli (member of BR)	First part of discussion: Guido Bodrato (DC parliamentary representative in 1978), Mario Capanna (member of Proletarian Democracy in 1978), Ugo Intini (journalist and politician), Oscar Mammì (PRI parliamentary representative in 1978), Ugo Pecchioli (PCI parliamentary representative in 1978), Dante Schietroma (PSDI parliamentary representative in 1978), Valerio Zanone (PLI parliamentary representative in 1978); Second part of discussion: Giovanni De Matteo (Judge of Rome in 1978), Umberto Improta (Police officer), Luciano Infelisi (Judge of Rome in 1978), Roberto Martinelli (journalist), Antonio Padellaro (journalist), Severino Santiapichi (Judge of Aldo Moro trial), Ivo Sassi (General of Carabinieri)
February 28, 1990	12	Kidnapping of Aldo Moro – Part 2	Mario Moretti (member of BR from 1970 to 1981)	Gennaro Acquaviva (politician), Tina Anselmi (DC parliamentary representative in 1978), Manfredi Bosco (DC parliamentary representative in 1978), Gerardo Chiaromonte (PCI parliamentary representative in 1978), Giovanni Ferrara (PRI parliamentary representative in 1978), Franco Franchi (MSI parliamentary representative in 1978), Giovanni Galloni (DC parliamentary representative in 1978), Ferdinando Imposimato (Judge of Rome in 1978), Claudio Signorile (PSI parliamentary representative in 1978), Gianfranco Spadaccia (journalist and politician)
March 7, 1990	13	Kidnapping of Aldo Moro – Part 3	Mario Ferrandi (member of Prima Linea (PL)), some members of BR, interview with Benigno Zaccagnini	Piero Alberto Capotosti (jurist), Lucio Colletti (philosopher), Adolfo Gatti (criminal lawyer), Bianca Guidetti Serra (criminal lawyer), Antonio Marini (magistrate), Gianfranco Miglio (jurist and political scientist), Franco Russo (member of Proletarian Democracy in 1978), Severino Santiapichi (Judge of Aldo Moro trial), Oscar Luigi Scalfaro (DC parliamentary representative in 1978), Pietro Scoppola (historian, academic and politician), Lucio Villari (historian)
March 14, 1990	14	Prima Linea	some members of PL	
March 21, 1990	15	1979–81 in Italy	Roberto Rosso (PL ideologue), some members of BR, Gianni Letta (journalist), Giuliano Zincone (journalist)	Gaspare Barbiellini Amidei (journalist), Mario Cervi (journalist), Vittorio Emiliani (journalist), Miriam Mafai (journalist), Valentino Parlato (journalist), Emilio Rossi (journalist), Marco Taradash (journalist and politician), Livio Zanetti (journalist), Guglielmo Zucconi (journalist)
March 28, 1990	16	Bologna massacre and Train 904 bombing	Valerio Fioravanti and Francesca Mambro (Italian neo-fascists and members of NAR)	Tina Anselmi (DC parliamentary representative in 1990), Odoardo Ascari (lawyer), Guido Calvi (criminal lawyer), Pier Ferdinando Casini (DC parliamentary representative in 1990), Adriano Cerquetti (lawyer), Fabio Dean (criminal lawyer), Franco Ferraresi (sociologist), Giulio Maceratini (MSI parliamentary representative in 1990), Franco Piro (PSI parliamentary representative in 1990), Renato Zangheri (Mayor of Bologna from 1970 to 1983), Roberto Villetti (journalist and politician), Ambrogio Viviani (former Head of counterintelligence), Torquato Secci (activist and president of Associazione tra i familiari delle vittime della strage di Bologna del 2 agosto 1980 from 1981 to 1996)
April 4, 1990	17	Decline and defeat of terrorism	Patrizio Peci (first Pentito of BR), other members of BR	Sabino Acquaviva (sociologist), Adriano Bausola (philosopher and academic), Antonio Glauco Casanova (journalist and politician), Gabriele De Rosa (historian and politician), Franco Ferrarotti (sociologist), Piero Ottone (journalist), Giuseppe Tamburrano (historian and journalist), Giuseppe Tricoli (historian and politician), Antonello Trombadori (art critic, journalist and politician), Saverio Tutino (journalist)
April 11, 1990	18	Epilogue: after terrorism	Giulio Andreotti (Italian Prime Minister in 1990), some terrorists, Carlo Maria Martini (Archbishop of Milan in 1990)	Giuliano Amato (PSI parliamentary representative in 1990), Nicolò Amato (Judge of Rome in the 1970s), Ernesto Balducci (Roman Catholic priest), Alfredo Biondi (PLI parliamentary representative in 1990), Marco Boato (Rainbow Greens parliamentary representative in 1990), Giovanni Ferrara (PRI parliamentary representative in 1990), Pino Rauti (national secretary of MSI in 1990), Rossana Rossanda (journalist), Gianfranco Spadaccia (PR parliamentary representative in 1990), Aldo Tortorella (PCI parliamentary representative in 1990), Claudio Vitalone (DC parliamentary representative in 1990)
