= Marco Boato =

Italian politician (born 1944)

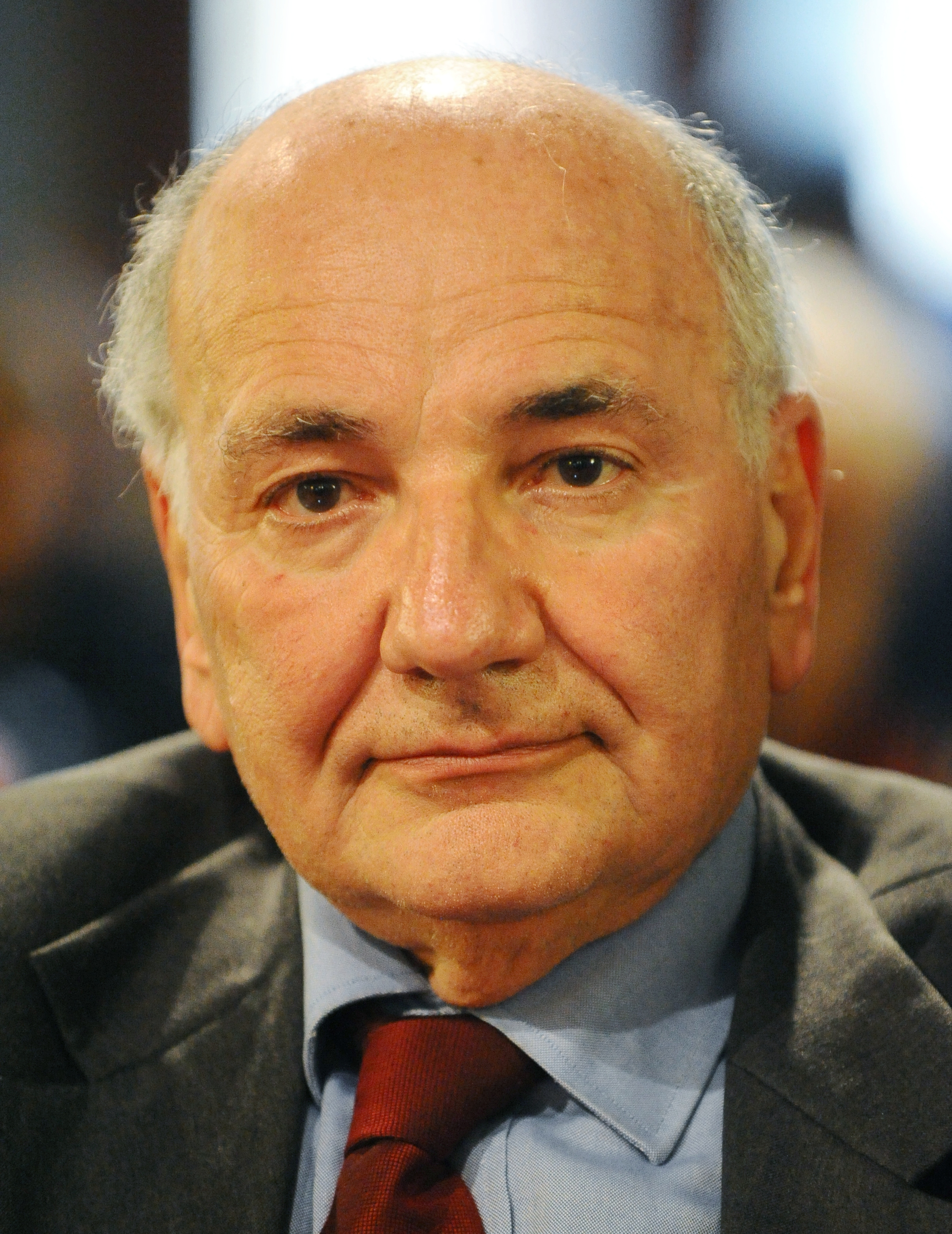

Member of the Chamber of Deputies
- In office 1979–1983
- In office 1992–1994
- In office 1996–2008

Member of the Senate
- In office 1987–1992

Personal details
- Born: 27 July 1944 (age 81) Venice, Veneto, Italy
- Party: DP (1975–1979); PR (1979–1989); VA (1989–1990); FdV (1990–present)
- Profession: Politician, University professor

Marco Boato (born 27 July 1944 in Venice) is an Italian politician.

== Biography ==
In 1969 Boato was one of the founders, together with Adriano Sofri, Paolo Sorbi, Mauro Rostagno, Guido Viale, Paolo Brogi and Giorgio Pietrostefani, of the communist political movement Lotta Continua.

A progressive Christian, in 1973 he was among the promoters of the Christians for Socialism movement. Subsequently, he joined Proletarian Democracy and the Radical Party. He has served as Deputy and Senator several times between 1979 and 2008.

He holds the record for the longest speech held in the history of the Italian Chamber of Deputies, for the speech he delivered in 1981 lasting over 18 hours and 5 minutes against the extension of one year of police detention established by a decree law of Francesco Cossiga.
