= The Front Line (2009 film) =

- Directed by: Renato De Maria
- Written by: Sandro Petraglia; Ivan Cotroneo; Fidel Signorile
- Starring: Riccardo Scamarcio; Giovanna Mezzogiorno
- Cinematography: Gianfilippo Corticelli
- Edited by: Marco Spoletini
- Music by: Max Richter
- Release date: 2009
- Language: Italian

The Front Line (Italian: La prima linea) is a 2009 Italian crime-drama film written and directed by Renato De Maria. It is based on the memoirs of the Prima Linea terrorist Sergio Segio.

== Cast ==
- Riccardo Scamarcio as Sergio Segio
- Giovanna Mezzogiorno as Susanna Ronconi
- Fabrizio Rongione as Claudio
- Duccio Camerini as Sergio Segio's Father
- Lino Guanciale as Piero
- Dario Aita as Massimo
- Michele Alhaique as Rosario
- Jacopo Maria Bicocchi as Marco Donat-Cattin
- Anita Kravos as Marina Premoli, the Countess
- Lucia Mascino as Loredana Biancamano
