= Inge Feltrinelli =

German-born Italian photographer (1930–2018)

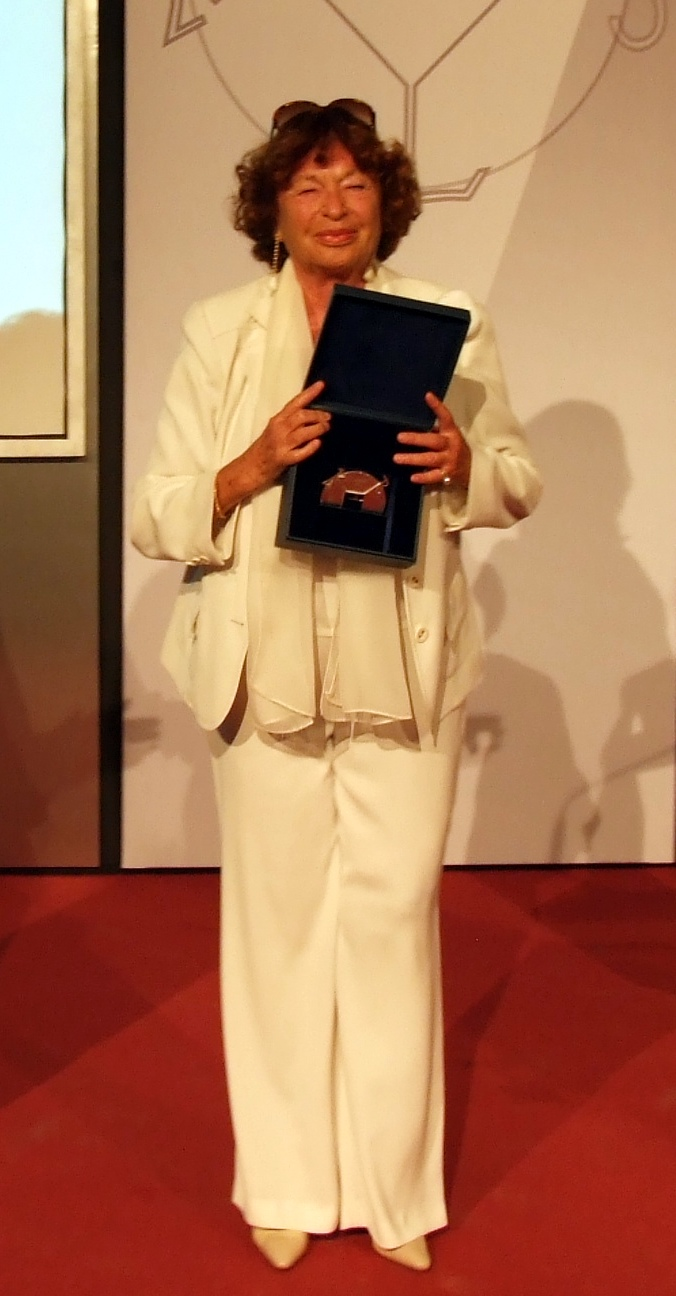
- Inge Schönthal–Feltrinelli receiving the 2011 Charlemagne Medal for European Media
- Born: Inge Schönthal; 24 November 1930; Göttingen, Germany
- Died: 20 September 2018 (aged 87); Milan, Italy
- Occupations: Photographer, publisher

Inge Feltrinelli (née Schönthal; 24 November 1930 – 20 September 2018) was a German-born Italian photographer, journalist, editor and publisher; she was the third wife of Giangiacomo Feltrinelli. After his death, she ran his publishing house Giangiacomo Feltrinelli Editore with their son Carlo.

== Biography ==
=== Early years and journalism ===
Inge Schönthal was born on 24 November 1930 in Göttingen. Her father, textile manufacturer Siegfried Schönthal was of Jewish descent; when Hitler rose to power, Inge's mother Trudl helped him escape to the Netherlands and then to the USA in 1938. Trudl remarried soon after; her new husband Otto was a German officer who helped to save Inge from the Nazis. However, Inge's Jewish background led to her expulsion from a Gymnasium (secondary school) in Göttingen. She recalled post-war years as full of terror, when the Nazis' atrocities became known, and hunger and poverty.

After World War II, Inge moved to Hamburg where she met Rosmarie Pierer. Pierer taught her the basics of photography and inspired her to pursue a career in journalism. In Hamburg she met an arms dealer who offered her a free passage to the USA on a cargo ship. She agreed immediately. Unfortunately, her real father rejected her and the reconciliation never happened. In 1952, during a long stay in New York City, Inge Schönthal made a street photo of Greta Garbo and sold it to Life magazine for $50. That shot made her famous and led to her working with Elia Kazan, John Fitzgerald Kennedy, and Winston Churchill. She also made friends with Erwin Blumenfeld. Among her most celebrated photos are those of writers Ernest Hemingway, Edoardo Sanguineti, Allen Ginsberg, Günter Grass, Nadine Gordimer and artists Pablo Picasso and Marc Chagall.

=== Marriage to Feltrinelli and editorial career ===
She met Italian left-wing publisher Giangiacomo Feltrinelli in 1958, whom she later married in Mexico and followed to Milan. There, she took charge of international relations for the publishing house and eventually became the de facto head of the publishing house. In 1962, when Henry Miller Tropic of Cancer was published and caused a major scandal, they pretended it had been printed in France, solely for the foreign market, and for five years they sold it in Italy in defiance of the law.

In 1969, she was named vice-president in a company restructure decided by Feltrinelli (who remained president in name only) as Feltrinelli embraced the "struggle for the revolution against imperialism" and shifted to clandestine activities. She confessed that Feltrinelli was her only true love and that they had separated after 14 years because of political disagreements. When Giangiacomo Feltrinelli died in 1972, she became president of the company, which she led together with her son Carlo.

An active and passionate editor, Inge Feltrinelli became the ‘queen of Italian publishing’. She was sometimes compared to Giulio Einaudi because they both shared a talent to identify a future bestseller after only ‘sniffing’ the manuscript. She also established close relationships with many of her authors, some of whom she nurtured like a mother. Journalist and writer Mario Baudino recalled how Feltrinelli was kicked out of a luxury hotel in Frankfurt, where she was staying for the Buchmesse, an international book fair, because she had hidden in her room Daniel Cohn-Bendit, who was wanted by the police. In 1979, she was elected to the board of directors of the Italian Publishers Association. Since 1987, she played a leading role in organization of the Turin Book Fair, she also sponsored Bari Book Fair and helped with Frankfurter Buchmesse.

Inge saved the publishing house during its difficult period and, despite considerable opposition, worked tirelessly to ensure that its standards remained as close as possible to the traditions of the company’s early years. She was also the one to push the bookshop chain to grow, she designed them to be somewhat as an extension of her own home which she always wanted to be full of guests and joy.

Feltrinelli was fond of bright clothes and accessories, unusual among milanese black, blue, and beige. Even at Armani’s most formal fashion shows, she was often the only one dressed in red or orange. Her house in Milan on via Andegari was a centre of attraction where writers and guests from all over the world met. She was described as a complete opposite of Proust's Madame Verdurin.

=== Political stance ===
Inge Feltrinelli was also very active in politics, taking part in the activities of the Italian Communist Party and its rallies. She was at the centre of numerous political events; she supported journalist Camilla Cederna during the trial over the murder of Luigi Calabresi and the investigation into the Pinelli case. In 1978, Feltrinelli published an investigative book by Cederna, Giovanni Leone. La carriera di un presidente (Giovanni Leone. The career of a president), that led to Lockheed bribery scandals, one of the most serious government crises to have engulfed the Italian Republic, and eventually cost Leone his post. The president’s sons sued Cederna for defamation and won the case; the journalist was fined one million Italian lire, and the publishing house 400,000 lire.

Back in 1964, she accompanied her husband to Cuba, where he interviewed Fidel Castro. She described Castro's words on communism as superficial and unrealistic. Though she didn’t share many views of Feltrinelli regarding politics and Castro personally, she admitted that the island had changed for the better since 1953 when she first visited Cuba.

=== Late years and death ===
For more than 40 years, she had a relationship with the famous Argentine designer and artist Tomas Maldonado.

Inge Feltrinelli passed away on 20 September 2018, in Milan. Maldonado survived her only for two months and died in November 2018, aged 96.

== Heritage ==
Premio Inge Feltrinelli (Inge Feltrinelli Award) was inaugurated in 2022. Sponsored by Gruppo Feltrinelli, it is awarded to female writers from around the world who are campaigning for human rights. The award is presented in four categories: literature, children’s literature, reportageб and investigative journalism.

== Awards and recognition ==
- 1986 – Order of Merit of the Italian Republic;
- 1991 – Laurea honoris causa, University of Ferrara;
- 1996 – honorary member of the Accademia di Brera, Milan;
- 1999 – the Knight's Cross of the Federal Republic of Germany;
- 2002 – Commander of the Ordre des Arts et des Lettres, France;
- 2004 – Laurea honoris causa in Languages and Foreign Literature, IULM University of Milan;
- 2006 – Publishing Merit Award at the XX International Bookfair in Guadalajara;
- 2008 – member of the European and Ibero-American Academy of Yuste, Spain;
- 2011 – Charlemagne Prize, Aachen;
- 2011 – Laurea honoris causa, Heidelberg University;
- 2013 – Grand Officer of the Order of Merit of the Italian Republic;
- 2015 – Order of Merit for Labour, Italy.

== Publications ==
- Feltrinelli, Inge (2013). Mit Fotos die Welt erobern [Conquer the World with Photos] (1st ed.). Göttingen: Steidl. ISBN 9783869305295.
- Feltrinelli, Inge (2013). Photographs. Steidl. ISBN 9783869305837.

== Literature ==
- Giocondi, Michele (2018). Breve storia dell’editoria italiana (1861-2018) con 110 schede monografiche delle case editrici di ieri e di oggi. Dai fratelli Treves a Jeff Bezos. ISBN 9788833631196.
- Lorenzini, Niva (2005). Il Gruppo 63 quarant'anni dopo. Pendragon. p. 346. ISBN 9788883423277.
- Cesana, Roberta (2024). The Edinburgh Companion to Women in Publishing, 1900-2020. Edinburgh University Press. p. 200.
