= Lotta Continua =

Italian far-left militant movement (1969–1976)

- Formation: 1 November 1969
- Dissolved: 6 November 1976; 50 years ago
- Type: Far-left movement
- Headquarters: Rome
- Location: Italy
- Founder: Adriano Sofri; Giorgio Pietrostefani
- Principal ideologists: Toni Negri; Mario Tronti; Raniero Panzieri
- Key people: Adriano Sofri, Giorgio Pietrostefani, Enrico Deaglio, Marco Donat-Cattin, Gad Lerner, Gianfranco Bettin, Erri De Luca, Giovanni Lindo Ferretti, Alexander Langer, Marino Sinibaldi, Marco Rizzo, Costanzo Preve
- Main organ: Lotta Continua

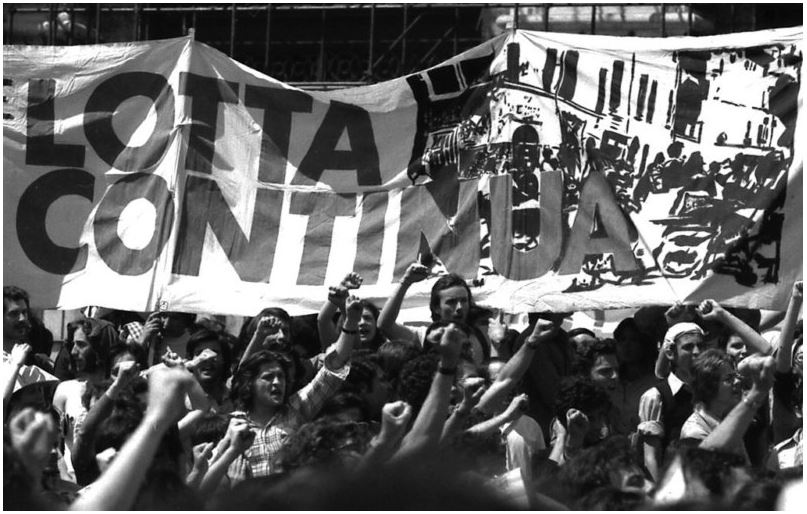
Lotta Continua

Lotta Continua (LC; English: Continuous Struggle) was a far-left organization in Italy, during the historical period of social turmoil and political violence in the country known as the "Years of Lead". Its leaders Adriano Sofri and Giorgio Pietrostefani were convicted for complicity in the assassination of police officer Luigi Calabresi in 1972. Militant Cesare Battisti later joined other organisations and fled to France after being convicted for four homicides. Some other militants later joined the more famous Red Brigades. After the disbandment of the organisation, various former militants became influential Italian politicians, journalists or writers.

Lotta Continua was founded in autumn 1969 by a split in the student-worker movement of Turin, which had started militant activity at the universities and factories such as Fiat. The first issue of Lotta Continua (LC's eponymous newspaper) was published in November 1969, and publication continued until 1982 after the organisation disbanded in 1976.

== Ideology ==
Lotta Continua focused on spreading radicalisation from students and youth to workers, and played a large role in setting up social centres. Its influence was greatest among recently immigrated, young, unskilled workers in large factories, while the "traditional" working class kept its allegiance to the Italian Communist Party and the trade union movement.

Among the newspaper's enduring features was Roberto Zamarin's comic strip "Gasparazzo", which poignantly and humorously related the struggles of a worker at a Fiat plant.

The group's leadership included Adriano Sofri, Mauro Rostagno, Guido Viale, Giorgio Pietrostefani, Erri De Luca, Paolo Brogi and Marco Boato. Other notable contributors included Gad Lerner and Alexander Langer. Since Italian law required that every newspaper needed a professional journalist to act as its managing editor, for some time, Pier Paolo Pasolini lent his name in order to allow Lotta Continua's publication.

At first, a loose grouping with a focus on spontaneous action, it was centralised between 1972 and 1974, with its paper becoming a daily. As opportunities became more limited, it disbanded in 1976 after a national congress characterised by a severe ideological clash between male and female militants. At that time, Sofri and others embraced electoral politics, while some militants joined armed organisations, including Prima Linea and the Red Brigades. The newspaper was published until 1982.

During the 1980s, most of Lotta Continua's representatives abandoned their original ideology. Marco Boato and Mimmo Pinto went to the Radical Party, others worked on TV (RAI or Fininvest) or in various newspapers. Many joined the Italian Socialist Party (PSI), supporting in particular Bettino Craxi's positions. Erri De Luca became a famous writer after joining various humanitarian organisations. Only a few of them, such as Marco Revelli and Fulvio Grimaldi, joined Rifondazione Comunista.

== Deaths ==
On 17 May 1972, the Milan police commissioner, Luigi Calabresi, thought to be responsible for Giuseppe Pinelli's death, was killed. Adriano Sofri and Giorgio Pietrostefani, former leaders of Lotta Continua, were condemned to long prison sentences for complicity in the murder (concorso morale in omicidio), and Ovidio Bompressi and Leonardo Marino for carrying it out. Ovidio Bompressi is one of the few political activists who has been pardoned (in May 2006) by Italian president Giorgio Napolitano (Democrats of the Left, DS) because of health reasons.

On 11 March 1977, Francesco Lorusso, a militant of Lotta Continua, was killed in Bologna by the police.

On 1 October 1977, during a protest march in Turin, following the murder of LC militant Walter Rossi in Rome by neo-fascists, a bar was attacked by means of Molotov cocktails. Roberto Crescenzio, a 23-year-old student, died of burns sustained in this attack. Far-left militants and LC organisers of the march were accused of committing this attack and later condemned; the trial clarified that the attacker warned the attendants before throwing the Molotovs, but Crescenzio could not hear because he was in the toilet at that moment.

== See also ==
- A luta continua
- Autonomia Operaia
- Big Flame (political group)
- Potere Operaio
- Prima Linea
