= Sergio Zavoli =

Italian journalist and politician (1923–2020)

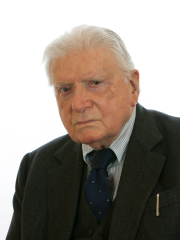
- Zavoli in 2013

Member of the Senate of the Republic
- In office 30 May 2001 – 22 March 2018
- Constituency: Emilia-Romagna (2001–2013); Campania (2013–2018)

Personal details
- Born: 21 September 1923 Ravenna, Emilia-Romagna, Kingdom of Italy
- Died: 4 August 2020 (aged 96) Rome, Lazio, Italy
- Resting place: Monumental Cemetery of Rimini
- Party: DS (2004–2007); PD (2007–2018)
- Spouses: Rosalba (died 2014); Alessandra Chello (m. 2017)
- Children: 1
- Profession: Politician, journalist

Sergio Wolmar Zavoli (21 September 1923 – 4 August 2020) was an Italian sports and documentary journalist and politician.

Born in Ravenna and raised in Rimini, Zavoli joined RAI, Italy's state broadcaster, as a sports radio journalist in 1947. He won two Prix Italia awards for his travel documentary Notturno a Cnosso (1953) and Clausura (1957), which included interviews with enclosed nuns. In 1962, he inaugurated the first transmission of Il processo alla tappa, a popular series of sports programmes dedicated to the Giro d'Italia. Zavoli's notable historical documentaries included Nascita di una dittatura (1972), which won the Saint-Vincent Prize, and La notte della Repubblica (1989–90), which documented the Years of Lead. Zavoli served as RAI's president between 1980 and 1986.

In the 2001 general election, Zavoli was elected senator for the Democrats of the Left, and was reelected for the Olive Tree and Democratic Party in subsequent elections until his retirement at the 2018 general election. Between 2009 and 2013, he served as Chairman of the RAI Supervisory Commission. Zavoli died in Rome on 4 August 2020, aged 96, and was laid to rest near Riminese filmmaker Federico Fellini, a close friend, in the Monumental Cemetery of Rimini.

Alongside his journalism and political career, Zavoli published several fictional and non-fictional books. His documentaries were notable for platforming voices directly, and their respectful portrayal of political opponents.

== Early life and career ==
Zavoli was born in Ravenna on 21 September 1923. He attended the classical lyceum in Rimini, graduating in 1943.

Zavoli's journalistic career began as a football radio commentator in 1945. He collaborated in the production of a twice-daily news bulletin broadcast to Rimini's Piazza Cavour; in particular, Zavoli reported on Rimini FC's matches. The broadcast was the predecessor of the daily summer radio programme broadcast along Rimini's beaches; Zavoli is credited with the broadcast's name, Publiphono. In the late 1940s, Zavoli directed Città Nuova, a weekly newspaper dedicated to discussing Rimini's post-war reconstruction, to which Renato Zangheri, future mayor of Bologna, also contributed.

== Journalism ==
=== Sports journalism and early documentaries ===
In 1947, Zavoli was scouted for RAI, the Italian state broadcasting company, by Vittorio Veltroni, who led RAI's radio commentary editorial team. He made his first debut on national radio on 15 February 1948 at a Roma–Fiorentina match, substituting an indisposed commentator.

Zavoli's early documentaries included Scartamento ridotto (1952), exploring local views about the replacement of the steam engine on the Rimini–Novafeltria railway with oil-powered railcars. His Notturno a Cnosso (1953), produced with Giovanni Battista Angioletti, documented a nocturnal tourist itinerary in Crete, including the island's mythology and history; the documentary won the 1953 Prix Italia. Zavoli won a second Prix Italia in 1958 for Clausura (1957), exploring support and criticism for enclosed nuns, which included interviews through the grates of their enclosures. The documentary was translated into six languages, and its footage reused in a 2001 television series.

=== Move to television ===
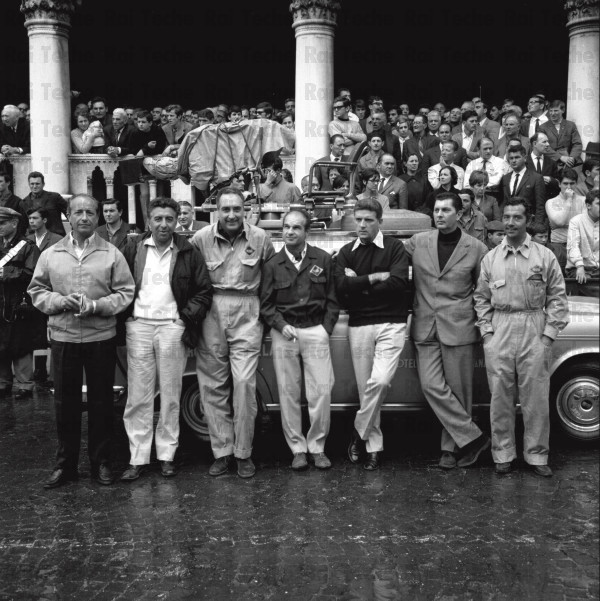
Sergio is third from the right in this photograph of RAI sports journalists, taken in June 1967.

In the 1960s, Zavoli moved more definitively to television. In 1962, he inaugurated the first transmission of Il processo alla tappa, a popular series of sports programmes dedicated to the Giro d'Italia; Zavoli had created a similar programme on radio in 1958. His documentary I giardini di Abele (1969) reported from inside a psychiatric hospital in Gorizia. While making documentaries on current affairs, he also produced notable historical investigative documentaries, including Nascita di una dittatura (1972), a six-part series documenting the birth of Fascist Italy which won the Saint-Vincent Prize, and La notte della Repubblica (1989–90), documenting the Years of Lead in eighteen episodes. Panzini ha cent’anni (1963), a centenary documentary of Alfredo Panzini's bicycle journey to Bellaria, was celebrated locally.

Alongside those of Cesare Zavattini, Zavoli's documentaries were considered part of a new movement in Italian documentaries which were broadcast from the field rather than reshot in studios. Zavoli paid particular attention to platforming voices directly. Writing for La Stampa in 1977, Furio Colombo said that Zavoli's success was attributable to his respectful portrayal of political opponents, a quality that was rare in the Italian press at the time. He disliked intellectual sloppiness, which he called talking dialect (parlare dialetto), leading him to encourage doubt and critical inquiry against assumed certainties.

=== RAI leadership and later career ===
From 1976 to 1980, Zavoli was director of news programming on RAI's Radio 1, after which he became RAI's president until 1986. Zavoli navigated RAI through the advent of private broadcasters.

In 1993, Zavoli became the founding president of San Marino's state broadcaster, San Marino RTV. He directed Il Mattino, a daily newspaper in Naples, between 1993 and 1994. In 2001, Zavoli's series Diario di un cronista retold the story of his most significant investigative documentaries in fifty-five episodes.

In 1986, he was awarded an honorary degree in literature by the University of Urbino. Zavoli returned to the university in later years, organising and attending commemorative ceremonies. On 26 March 2007, for the "extraordinary contribution made to the cause of Italian journalism", the Faculty of Letters and Philosophy of the University of Rome Tor Vergata awarded him an honorary degree in specialist publishing, multimedia communication and journalism. In 2007, he became President of the Journalism School of the University of Salerno.

== Political career ==
In the 2001 general election, Zavoli was elected senator for the Democrats of the Left. On 22 June 2001, he joined the commission on the environment and environmental heritage, moving to the foreign affairs and emigration commission on 23 March 2004, and finally to the public education and cultural heritage commission on 29 September 2005. The first bill he introduced, on 17 October 2001, called for annual contributions to the Centro Nazionale di Studi Leopardiani and an institute in Rome dedicated to Eugenio Montale.

In the 2006 general election, Zavoli and was reelected for the Olive Tree, moving to the library and historical archive commission on 7 July 2006 and becoming its president from 18 October 2006 until the 2008 general election, in which he was reelected for the Democratic Party. While his first presidency of the library and historical archive commission ended, he remained a member for the rest of his political career, and rejoined the public education and cultural heritage commission from 22 May 2008 to 15 December 2009, after which he returned to the public education and cultural heritage commission until 24 February 2011, when he returned to the environment and environmental heritage commission.

Zavoli served as Chairman of the RAI Supervisory Commission from 4 February 2009 until 14 March 2013, succeeded by Roberto Fico. Zavoli's appointment was widely reported in the Italian press as a compromised solution by Italy's political establishment following the controversy of Riccardo Villari's appointment.

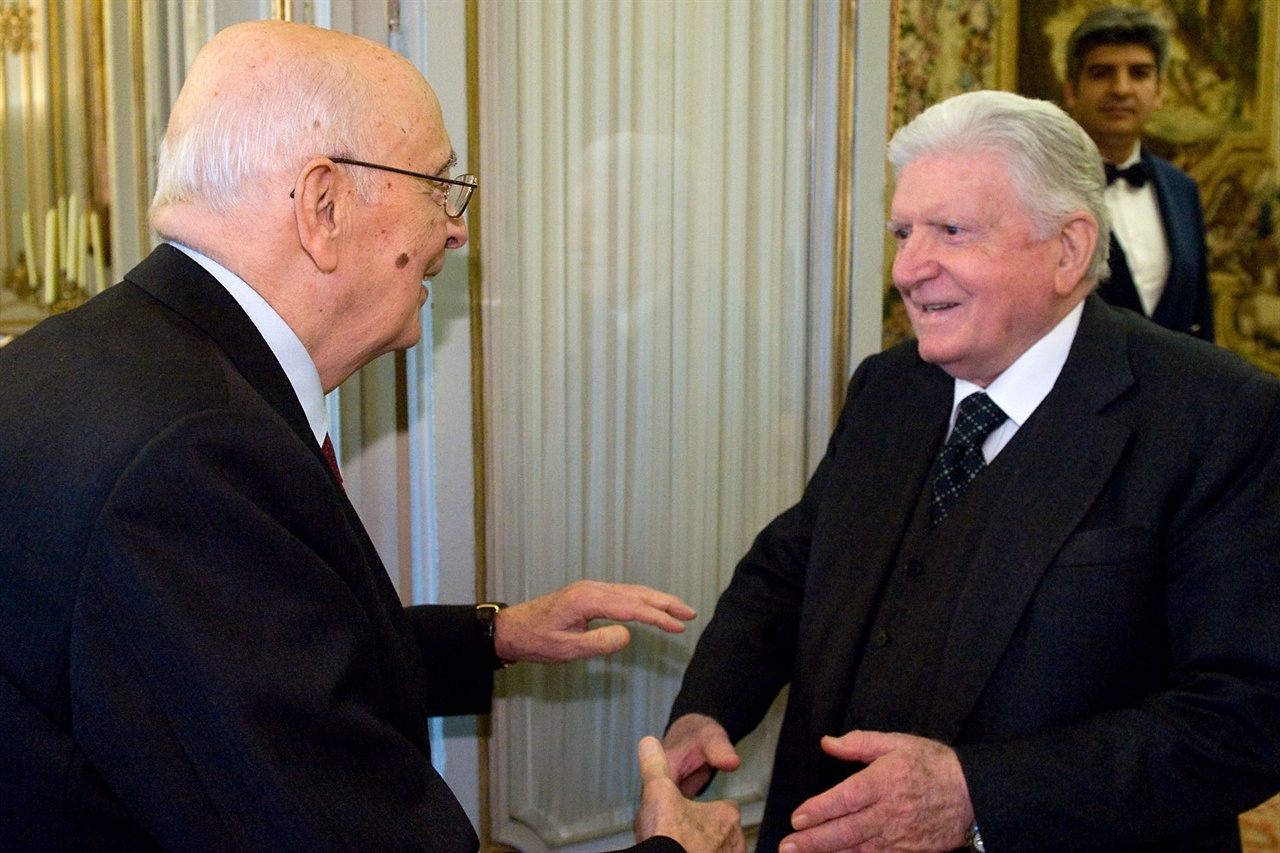
Zavoli (left) with Giorgio Napolitano (right), President of Italy, February 2010

Zavoli was reelected for the Democratic Party in the 2013 general election; aged 89, he was the oldest elected candidate. He had a second term as president of the library and historical archive commission from 18 September 2013 to 22 March 2018, and rejoined the public education and cultural heritage commission on 7 May 2013. Zavoli retired at the 2018 general election. Contrary to a TG2 report on his death, Zavoli was never a senator for life.

Among the legislative bills Zavoli cosigned as senator were a bill for a bank holiday on 17 March commemorating the proclamation of the Kingdom of Italy, a bill for a trade conference in Parma on food safety, and a bill for new tax regulations on the sale of truffles. On 12 October 2006, following Pope Benedict XVI's Regensburg lecture, Zavoli spoke in the senate on "the treasures of harmony and wisdom that [Islam] continues to reserve also to the civic and cultural dimensions of tradition". On 29 April 2008, he supported a bill by Ignazio Marino that would have facilitated assisted suicide.

== Writings ==
In his childhood, Zavoli dreamed of becoming a poet or writer. Among Zavoli's earlier writings are a collection of anecdotes and characters from Romagna, published in 1959. In 1981, he published Socialista di Dio, which won the Bancarella Award. Several writings on the nature of God, history, and secularism followed in the early 2000s.

Zavoli published books on Rimini's local history, including its post-liberation years and an autobiographical work on his memories of the Italian resistance. He prefaced several books on sports journalism. After turning towards publishing poems in his later life, in 2011, Zavoli published the autobiography Il ragazzo che io fui.

== Personal life ==
Zavoli was made an honorary citizen of Rimini on 30 September 1972, which the mayor felt necessary to remedy "an injustice towards Zavoli himself and those who had believed him to be from Rimini". On several occasions, he expressed concerns on the city's development towards mass tourism, finding it "unnatural". In 2014, Zavoli became honorary president of Rimini's Prize for Young Poetry.

Zavoli was a close friend of Riminese film director Federico Fellini, with whom he would communicate frequently by telephone. Against the outcry from the film industry, Fellini supported Zavoli's short-lived appointment to the directing board of the Venice Film Festival, calling him "an independent man in his judgments" who "is from Rimini and has always been my friend". For Fellini's funeral on 4 November 1993, Zavoli edited footage he shot into a historical archive, and delivered a funeral oration in Rimini's Piazza Cavour. Ten years later, he wrote the preface and afterword to a book in tribute to Fellini. As well as Fellini, Zavoli was also a close friend of Tonino Guerra.

Zavoli's first wife, Rosalba, died in 2014; he had one daughter with her, Valentina. In 2017, Zavoli married Alessandra Chello, a journalist whom he met on the editorial staff of Il Mattino. The marriage was conducted in secret in Monte Porzio Catone; Zavoli was aged 93 while Chello was 51.

In his later years, Zavoli lived in a villa in Monte Porzio Catone. In December 2012, aged 89, he was attacked by four burglars.

== Death ==
Zavoli died in Rome on 4 August 2020, aged 96. Among those expressing public condolences were Sergio Mattarella, President of Italy, Nicola Zingaeretti, secretary of the Democratic Party, Stefano Bonaccini, President of Emilia-Romagna, the Diocese of Rimini, and municipal and provincial mayors. Zavoli's death was widely reported on Italian news programmes. A minute's silence was held in the Italian Senate at the opening of its session on 6 August 2020.

Zavoli's funeral was held at San Salvatore in Lauro in Rome on 7 August 2020. Its celebrants included Nunzio Galantino and Giulio Albanese, and senior figures in Italian politics and telecommunications were present, including journalists Gianni Letta, presenter Renzo Arbore, and politicians Walter Veltroni, Franco Carraro, Silvia Costa, Maria Elena Boschi, Anna Finocchiaro, Valeria Fedeli, and Luigi Zanda. After the funeral, Zavoli was transported to Rimini, where a funeral chapel had been installed for public mourning in the Amintore Galli Theatre. In accordance with his wishes, on 8 August 2020, Zavoli was buried a few steps from Fellini and his wife, Giulietta Masina, in the Monumental Cemetery of Rimini, in a ceremony presided by the diocesan bishop.

== Legacy ==
Il ragazzo e la città (2023), a concert-show written and directed by Massimo Roccaforte, was performed at the Amintore Galli Theatre on the occasion of the centenary of Zavoli's birth. Il sole tramonta alle spalle (2023), a film by Mauro Bartoli featuring two unpublished interviews with Zavoli, was also screened at Rimini's Fulgor Cinema for the centenary.
