= Luigi Calabresi =

Italian police officer assassinated by terrorists (1937–1972)

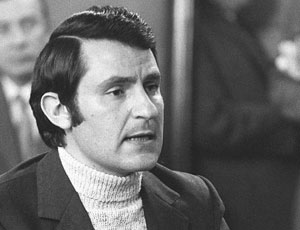
- Calabresi testifying in court, 1970
- Born: 14 November 1937; Rome, Italy
- Died: 17 May 1972 (aged 34); Milan, Italy
- Resting place: Cimitero Maggiore, Milan, Italy
- Education: Sapienza University of Rome
- Known for: Assassinated by far-left terrorists
- Spouse: Gemma Capra
- Relatives: (sons) Mario; Paolo; Luigi
- Police career
- Allegiance: State Police
- Department: Political Office for terrorism and subversion of Milan
- Rank: Chief Commissioner
- Awards: Medaglia d'Oro al Valor Civile in memoriam as a victim of terrorism, 14 may 2004

Luigi Calabresi (14 November 1937 – 17 May 1972) was an Italian Polizia di Stato officer in Milan. Responsible for investigating far-left political movements, Calabresi was assassinated in 1972 by members of Lotta Continua, who blamed him for the death of anarchist activist Giuseppe Pinelli in police custody in 1969. The deaths of Pinelli and Calabresi were significant events during the Years of Lead, a period of major political violence and unrest in Italy from the 1960s to the 1980s.

== Early life and education ==
Calabresi was born on 14 November 1937 into a middle-class Roman family. His father was a wine and cooking oil merchant. He attended the classical secondary school San Leone Magno and then the Sapienza University of Rome to study Law. In 1964, he successfully defended his Ph.D. thesis on the Sicilian Mafia. Having been part of Catholic associations during his years in school, he enrolled, while studying at the Sapienza, in the Oasis movement, founded in 1950 by Jesuits.

== Police career ==
After finishing his studies, Calabresi, feeling himself, as he'd confided to friends, unsuited for the forensic work of jurisprudence, chose to try to enlist in the police. In 1965, he won the competition to enter L'istituto superiore di polizia and, after completing his studies there, he was assigned to the position of deputy commissioner in Milan. During his time in the police force, he occasionally wrote articles that were published under a pseudonym in the newspaper Momento-sera.

Calabresi, in the course of his work in the political section of the police, cultivated contacts with various persons of the Italian left. Journalist Giampaolo Pansa, who knew him, described Calabresi as having a "cordial and easygoing air," someone who "reads a lot and tries to understand the ideas and the men of the extra-parliamentary left," ideas that had become "his job".

In 1967, after a series of contacts with the organisers of an event in Colico, Calabresi supported their request for a camping license, subsequently provided by the Como Police. During these contacts, Calabresi, according to his son Mario, met railway worker Giuseppe Pinelli, an anarchist activist and organiser. At next year's Christmas, Calabresi gave Pinelli as a gift Enrico Emanuelli's book 1000 Millions of People, a gift reciprocated by Pinelli the following August with Edgar Lee Masters' poetry collection Spoon River Anthology, ostensibly Pinelli's favorite book.

On 19 November 1969, the funeral of murdered policeman Antonio Annarumma in Milan was attended by large crowds and a number of prominent politicians. (Note: 22-year old policeman Annarumma had been killed during the violent clashes between demonstrators and the police during a large rally held by Italy's three major trade unions. The death, according to the subsequent official investigation, was caused by blows to the head with a metal tube. See Brambilla (1994). See Montanelli et al (2018).) Mario Capanna, of the Marxist group Movimento Studentesco joined the funeral procession in a public gesture of denunciation of political violence, but was physically attacked by a number of attendees. Calabresi was present and escorted Capanna away from the attacks. He'd previously met Capanna on 16 November 1967 while in charge of the police force that had evacuated Università Cattolica del Sacro Cuore, occupied for a few hours by students led by Capanna.

== Family ==
In 1968, Luigi Calabresi married Gemma Capra, whom he'd met at a celebratory party hosted by a friend in Milan. Genna had found him "witty, like Alberto Sordi." They had three sons: Mario, who grew up to become a journalist and author, and also an editor of La Repubblica; Paolo; and Luigi, born a few months after his father's death.

== Piazza Fontana bombing ==
The late 1960s and early 1970s were a period of intense political agitation in Italy, characterised also by frequent acts of violence, including assassinations. On 12 December 1969, at 16:37 hours local time, (Note: UTC 17:37 hrs) a bomb exploded at the headquarters of Banca Nazionale dell'Agricoltura (the National Agricultural Bank) in Piazza Fontana, near the Duomo cathedral, in Milan, Italy, killing seventeen people and wounding eighty-eight. The same day, three more bombs were detonated while a fourth was found unexploded, in Rome and Milan. No organisation declared itself responsible for the attacks. (Note: Neo-fascist militants, among whom most prominently were Franco Freda, Guido Giannettini, and Giovanni Ventura, were eventually indicted for the Piazza Fontana massacre and tried in 1977 in Catanzaro, where they received prison sentences of up to life imprisonment. See Patrimonio. The verdicts were appealed many times over until all defendants were acquitted in 1985 on account of "insufficient evidence" against them. See Bale (2018).) Calabresi, having already undertaken investigations into other bombing attacks, was assigned the inquest for Piazza Fontana. MP Francesco Cossiga of the Christian Democrats believed the terrorist attack had been undertaken by the "extreme right," as he testified in the Parliament decades later. There has not yet been a final judicial verdict as to the culprits of the massacre.

== Arrest, interrogation, and death of Giuseppe Pinelli ==
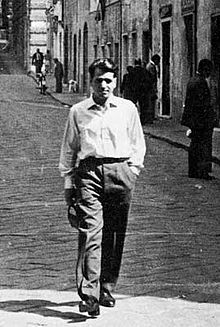
Pinelli in a photo taken by his wife in Venice during their honeymoon (1955)

Despite the July 2000 denial expressed at the Italian Parliament's commission of inquiry on terrorism in Italy and the causes of the failure to identify those responsible for the massacres by Antonio Allegra, Calabresi's superior officer at the time of the massacre, the investigation on the Milan bombing focused initially on militant anarchists. Directed by his superiors in Rome to investigate the anarchists that were part of the so-called Ghisolfa Bridge group, Calabresi ordered the round up of approximately eighty suspects. Twenty-seven of the anarchists were taken to the San Vittore Prison while the rest were kept at Milan police headquarters on Via Fatebenefratelli. Among those held there for interrogation were a number of Anarchist Black Cross members, including Giuseppe Pinelli.

Pinelli was allowed to come to the station on his Vespa; he was then illegally held in custody for more than 48 hours before being brought for questioning in Calabresi's office, at the 4th floor of police headquarters. In commissioner Calabresi's office were present Antonio Allegra and four policemen from the political section, Vito Panessa, Giuseppe Caracuta, Carlo Mainardi, and Pietro Mucilli, as well as Carabinieri lieutenant Savino Lograno, subsequently identified as a SISDE agent. The interrogation began the same day that a group of Milan anarchists gave a public press conference at the Circolo Ponte della Ghisolfa where the Piazza Fontana massacre was described as a "State massacre". On the night of the 15th of December 1969, and a little before midnight, the body of Pinelli was seen by l'Unità journalist Aldo Palumbo falling from the 4th floor window and crashing on the pavement below. Pinelli was taken to the hospital Azienda Ospedaliera Fatebenefratelli e Oftalmico where he was pronounced dead on arrival. According to the Fatebenefratelli hospital's duty doctor Nazzareno Fiorenzano, Pinelli had suffered "abdominal injuries and a series of gashes on the head." The autopsy ostensibly showed that Pinelli had been "either dead or unconscious" as he hit the ground, with a bruise like one, Fiorenzano claimed, caused by a kick, "possibly a karate blow," found on his neck.

On 30 December 1969, thousands of mourners and sympathisers followed Pinelli's funeral procession to the Cimitero Maggiore di Milano.

== Accusations and recriminations after Pinelli's death ==
=== Police press conference ===
On 16 December 1969, the day after Pinelli's death, Milan's chief of police Marcello Guida called a press conference that was also attended by Antonino Allegra and commissioner Calabresi. Guida stated that Pinelli had committed suicide:

Suddenly, Pinelli made a feline leap towards the window that had been left ajar due to the heat and threw himself into the void.

Guida speculated that the suicide could have been the result of Pinelli's frustration when his alibi about the day of the Piazza Fontana bombings was shown to be false. This speculative interpretation was subsequently retracted by Guida when Pinelli's alibi turned out to have been, in fact, true. Allegra spoke of Pinelli as having "changed" from the person he once knew among the anarchists and added that "some reports" showed Pinelli was "possibly" implicated in the Piazza Fontana bombing.

L'Unità reporter Renata Bottarelli noted Calabresi's contribution to the press conference: "First, [Calabresi] said that at the time of [Pinelli's] fall he was elsewhere; he had momentarily gone to Allegra's office to brief him on the crucial progress that, he reckoned, had been made. He had cited [to Pinelli] his dealings with a third person whom [Calabresi] obviously was not in a position to name, leaving [Pinelli] with the impression that he knew a lot more than in fact he did. [Calabresi] observed that Pinelli seemed startled and, disturbed by this [change], so he ordered the interview suspended while he went up to brief Allegra on this turn of events. In any case, Calabresi observed, this was not a proper interrogation." Nearly a month later, on 8 January 1970, Calabresi told reporters: "We were caught off guard by his action, not least because we did not think that [Pinelli's] position was serious. As far as we were concerned, Pinelli was still a decent guy and would probably have been going home the next day. I can say that we did not regard him as some key witness, but merely as someone to be heard."

=== Lawsuit by Pinelli's family ===
On 27 December 1969, Pinelli's widow Licia and his mother sued and filed a complaint against Milan police chief Marcello Guida in relation to actions that, as they asserted, constituted "ongoing and aggravated defamation" as well as "breaches of professional confidentiality and conduct". Deputy prosecutor Giuseppe Caizzi closed the investigation into Pinelli's death on 21 May 1970 with the verdict that the death was the result of "a wholly accidental circumstance." The file was forwarded to the chief examining magistrate Antonio Amati who closed the file on 3 July 1970. A few days later, on 17 July 1970, Caizzi had the case of Pinelli's wife and mother against police chief Marcello Guida also closed without reaching the courts, as having "no merit."

=== Indictments ===
In 1971, and following a June lawsuit by Pinelli's widow in which she formally accused the policemen ostensibly present in Calabresi's office of murder, kidnapping, assault, and abuse of authority, the inquest into the death of Pinelli was re-opened by magistrate Gerardo D'Ambrosio, who had previously been assigned also the criminal investigation of the Piazza Fontana bombing itself. On 4 October 1971, D'Ambrosio brought charges of manslaughter against Calabresi, Lo Grano, Panessa, Giuseppe Caracuta, Carlo Mainardi, and Pietro Mucilli. D'Ambrosio ordered Pinelli's body exhumed on 21 October for a second autopsy, which failed to discover anything new, such as signs of the supposed "karate blow" to the neck. It was remarked that the "advanced state of [the body's] decomposition" had rendered the second autopsy futile but also that the "bruising" that some considered suspect was a frequent consequence in corpses housed in morgues because of the compression of the head on the marble table. In October 1971, D'Ambrosio changed the indictment from murder to homicide and set a trial date for 1972.

In 1975, D'Ambrosio closed the investigation by establishing that Calabresi had not been present in the room at the time of Pinelli's fall and that the "suicide thesis" was unlikely due to the lack of any plausible motivation. D'Ambrosio considered instead as most probable a death causata da un malore, "caused by an active illness," thus ruling out defenestration homicide; consequently, all those accused or present in the room were exonerated.

=== Protests and denunciations ===
Organisations and parties of the Italian left commenced protests against what they perceived as the State's cover-up of the "true" circumstances of Pinelli's death. The Socialist Party's newspaper Avanti!, the PCI's daily l'Unità and its weekly companion Vie Nuove took up a campaign of denunciation against Italian law enforcement and Calabresi specifically. The communist extra-parliamentary organization Lotta Continua was prominent among those disputing the official version of events, denouncing Calabresi as directly implicated in Pinelli's death, an accusation repeated in shouted slogans of "Calabresi assassin!" in street demonstrations, and calling him "commissioner window." In a Lotta editorial, it was stated that "the elimination of a policeman will not free the exploited masses. But this is certainly a fundamental stage in the assault of the proletariat against the murderous State." In 1969, the anarchist musical group named after Gaetano Bresci recorded "The Ballad of Pinelli" which was subsequently interpreted by many other artists, with lyrics denouncing the "fascist Calabresi" and promising the "harshest revenge" for Pinelli's "murder."

In 1970, the film Indagine su un cittadino al di sopra di ogni sospetto (Investigation of a citizen above suspicion), directed by Elio Petri and starring Gian Maria Volonté, was released in Italy, depicting the chief of the police homicide squad committing a murder and getting away with it due to the "corrupt system of justice and law enforcement." Despite the film's disclaimer about "any relation to real-life events," practically "everyone" among the critics, the media and the audience "thought of Luigi Calabresi", "recognised Calabresi in the odious character of the police chief" in the film or, at the very least, "watched a Calabresi-style policeman."

On 5 December 1970, Dario Fo's theatrical play Morte accidentale di un anarchico (Accidental Death of an Anarchist) premiered in Milan. Its main character, the Maniac, is a fraudster who is arrested by the police but manages to impersonate a judge investigating an anarchist's "accidental death." It was produced in 1983 for British television's Channel Four, starring Gavin Richards. The play went on to be performed in almost forty countries.

On 13 June 1971, the weekly magazine L'Espresso published an open letter containing accusations that was written by Camilla Cederna, editor in the magazine and investigative journalist, and signed initially by ten persons and eventually by a total of 757 politicians, activists, intellectuals, artists, journalists, and others. The letter, also denoted as a "manifesto," directly and explicitly accused Calabresi of being "responsible" for the death of Pinelli and denounced the actions in that affair of judge Carlo Biotti, Calabresi's lawyer Michele Lener, commissioner Marcello Guida, and magistrates Giovanni Caizzi and Carlo Amati.

=== Lawsuit by Calabresi ===
On 15 April 1970, Calabresi brought charges against Pio Baldelli, editor-in-chief of the Lotta Continua magazine, for "ongoing and aggravated defamation through attribution of a specific act", to wit, the responsibility for Pinelli's death. The trial commenced on 9 October 1970. The previous month, in September 1970, L'Espresso weekly magazine had carried the public appeal made and signed by various Italian intellectuals, university lecturers, and politicians, such as Elvio Fachinelli, Lucio Gambi, Giulio Maccacaro, Cesare Musatti, Enzo Paci, Carlo Salinari and Mario Spinelli. Their open letter issued a challenge: "Railway man Pino Pinelli died on the night of 15–16 December 1969 as a result of a fall from a window at Milan police headquarters. How, we do not know. All we know is that he was innocent." The appeal also criticised, "respectfully but sternly," the "hasty" closure of the investigation by deputy prosecutor Giuseppe Caizzi. In the course of his testimony, Calabresi spoke of Pinelli as having been "a decent fellow" with whom "he had swapped views."

The testimony of other witnesses often contradicted their initial statements during the Caizzi investigation, such as the time the Pinelli interrogation ended or was interrupted. Savino Lo Grano, newly promoted carabinieri captain, after originally testifying he had watched Pinelli throughout the interrogation and saw him throw himself from the window, in court, he claimed he had been looking at the open window while two police officers, "trapped behind the shutters," had been unable to stop the anarchist from jumping. Brigadier Vito Panessa ended his testimony at the trial with the following statement: I've said I'm not in a position to provide details, but, broadly speaking, bear in mind that there was no agreed story and it was, therefore, a matter for investigation. Each of us went before Judge Caizzi and gave out a story."

In October 1971, the newspaper of Lotta Continua published a "letter of support" to the organisation and its newspaper, in view of the trial that followed Calabresi's lawsuit, addressed to the Turin Attorney General. It was signed by "numerous well-known intellectuals," such as Umberto Eco, Natalia Ginzburg, Cesare Zavattini, Nelo Risi, Lucio Colletti, and others. The letter proclaimed:

We testify that when the citizens you have accused declare that in this society the army is an instrument of capitalism, a means of repression of the class struggle, we declare it with them. When they say, 'if it is true that the masters are thieves, it is right to go and take back what they have stolen', we say it with them. When they shout 'we arm the masses', we shout it with them. When they pledge to fight one day with arms against the state until liberation from bosses and from exploitation, we pledge with them.

The trial was interrupted after a judge was challenged by Calabresi's lawyer on grounds of "prejudice" and a long recess followed, which lasted well into May 1972.

== Assassination of Calabresi ==
On 17 May 1972, at 09:15, after Luigi Calabresi had exited from his home at Via Cherubini No. 6 and started to walk towards his office, a man approached him from behind and fired two gunshots, one hitting Calabresi in the back and the other in the neck. The gunman then entered a "blue Fiat 125" whose driver sped away into the traffic. Calabresi died almost immediately.

Lotta Continua, the day after Calabresi's killing, released a statement: "Political murder is certainly not the decisive weapon for the emancipation of the masses from capitalist domination, just as clandestine armed action is certainly not the decisive form of the class struggle in the phase we are going through. But these considerations cannot in any way induce us to deplore Calabresi's killing." The newspaper's main title read, "Calabresi is dead, the main culprit of the assassination of Pinelli."

=== Investigation ===
The investigative authorities initially turned to members of the extraparliamentary organisations of the left. Following the arrest of neofascist Gianni Nardi in September 1972, a parallel inquest was launched into possible involvement of persons from the Italian extreme-right, though it made no progress.

In early 1974, neofascist journalist and SID operative Guido Giannettini told a reporter from L'Espresso that the Bundesnachrichtendienst or BND had "arranged" for Calabresi's assassination when they learned that the commissioner discovered that the West German intelligence service was furnishing "concrete" assistance to certain extreme-right groups in Italy, possibly to be used in terrorist acts or even a coup d'état. In mid-1974, right-wing militant Marcello Bergamaschi testified to the Italian police that Carlo Fumagalli, his chief in the armed, far-right group Movimento di Azione Rivoluzionaria, "knew many things" about the assassination. However, this line of inquiry also ended up nowhere. In 1979, a document was discovered at a safe house of the armed, extreme-left group Prima Linea that termed Calabresi's death "an act of proletarian justice," a finding that reactivated the investigation towards the extreme left. Within a year after the discovery of the document, various pentiti, including Roberto Sandalo, confirmed to the authorities that this was the correct trail.

In 1988, a former Lotta Continua militant, Leonardo Marino, turned himself in to the carabinieri and testified that he was the driver of the blue Fiat-125 used in the assassination and Ovidio Bompressi the person who shot and killed Calabresi, both acting "on the orders of [leading Lotta members] Adriano Sofri and Giorgio Pietrostefani." Marino detailed how, on 13 May 1972, four days before the attack on Calabresi, he'd met Sofri in Pisa, during a gathering organised by Lotta in commemoration of the death of the anarchist Franco Serantini. At the end of the gathering, and after a brief stop at a bar, according to Marino's statement, the two men went to a "more private place" where Sofri gave the "confirmation" to "go ahead with Calabresi."

Following Marino's testimony, all four were arrested and charged with murder in the first degree.

=== Trials ===
The resulting judicial process was complex, protracted, and controversial. On 2 May 1990, Adriano Sofri, Ovidio Bompressi and Giorgio Pietrostefani were each found guilty of Calabresi's murder and sentenced by the Milan criminal court to 22 years in prison. Leonardo Marino was also found guilty, with a reduced sentence of 11 years on account of his "repentance" and "assistance to law enforcement". Marino served no jail time. The defendants' appeal was dismissed on 12 July 1991 but the Court of Cassation annulled on 23 October 1992 the dismissal and ordered a re-trial. In the December 1993 retrial of the defendants' appeal, they were all acquitted. The prosecution protested the decision to the Court of Cassation, which annulled the appeal re-trial on account of "inconsistencies" in the decision's "reasoning." On 11 November 1995, the new re-trial of the defendant's appeals, reconfirmed the original prison sentences for Sofri, Bompressi, and Pietrostefani, and considered Marino's crime to be "extinct" on the basis of the new pentiti legislation, so Marino was freed.

On 22 January 1997, the Court of Cassation confirmed the decision of the appeals court and the sentences imposed therein, so Sofri and Bompressi commenced serving their sentences in the Pisa prison while Pietrostefani had absconded to France to avoid prison.

On 20 April 1998, Bompressi was temporarily released from prison for "health reasons", and, on 18 August 1998, his sentence was irrevocably reduced to house arrest.

On 6 October 1998, the Court of Cassation cancelled the decision of the Milan Court of Appeals and reopened the Sofri case. On 24 January 2000, the Court of Appeal of Venice confirmed the original sentence of 22 years. The historian Paul Ginsborg casts doubt on the final verdict, noting the sixteen-year gap between the crime and Marino's confession and the lack of other corroborating evidence.

In November 2005, Sofri, who had refused offers of political supporters to appeal for a pardon, suffered a ruptured oesophagus and, after convalescing in a hospital, the court allowed him to serve the remainder of his sentence under house arrest, at his Impruneta home. On 16 January 2012, Sofri was freed, having served his sentence. He started writing as guest columnist for Il Foglio, La Repubblica, and Panorama, and authored books on Italy's recent political past, such as L'ombra di Moro (The shadow of Moro).

On 17 May 2022, coincidentally, fifty years exactly after Calabresi's assassination, the Paris Court of Appeal heard the public prosecutor's proposal for Pietrostefani to be extradited to Italy to serve his prison sentence and decided to postpone its decision until the 29th of June. On 29 June 2022, the Court rejected Italy's request to extradite the former leftist militants whom the French authorities had arrested, including Giorgio Pietrostefani. The Court released a statement about its decision, citing "the right to respect for private and family life", "the right to a fair trial as laid out by articles 8 and 6 of the European Convention on Human Rights", and the fact that the extradition requests were for "acts committed before 1993".

== Aftermath ==
In 1984, Gemma married Milanese poet and designer Tonino Milite (Note: Tonino Milite was born in Albania, in 1942, to a father who was serving as a policeman in Tirana. Having fled to Italy, he became a poet and a designer, with his design of the rainbow-colored peace flag being the most famous of his creations. See Craziano Flore (2022).) and she took the name Gemma Calabresi Milite. They had one child, son Uber. When Milite died in 2015, journalist Mario Calabresi tweeted that Milite had raised them and "taken [them] out of the night", citing a line from Milite's poems. He also used that reference in the title of the book that he wrote about his father's history in 2007: "Spingendo la notte più in là" ("Pushing the night further").

=== Ideological repercussions ===
In 1976, Lotta Continua held its 2nd Congress at Rimini during the period from 31 October up to 4 November. It was held approximately four months after the 1976 general election in Italy, when Democrazia Proletaria ("Proletarian Democracy"), a cartello unitario or "unity cartel", which Lotta had joined, (Note: In 1975, Democrazia Proletaria was created by the organizations and collectives of the "revolutionary", extraparliamentary left Partito di Unità Proletaria per il Comunismo, Movimento Studentesco, and Avanguardia Operaia, in order to contest seats in the upcoming general election, with Lotta Continua joining in 1976. Other, smaller groupings subsequently supported PL, particularly at the local level. See Proletarian Democracy.) suffered what Lotta considered a "heavy defeat," taking in a total of about 557 thousand or 1.5% of the votes, though it still elected six deputies to the Italian Parliament. (Note: Three from PdUP, two from AO, and one from Lotta.) During the Congress, speakers pointed out the "fragmentation" of militancy into struggles for feminism, workers' rights, issues of youth, and so on, as well as the "distance" between the leadership and the "new needs " of the movement towards "unity," a path that ran contrary to the concept of "workers' autonomy." At the conclusion of the Congress, Adriano Sofri gave a summing up speech in which he "pointed the finger" at the leadership for being "irresponsible in the face of [internal] contradictions," and asserted the existence of "an ambiguity that has accompanied the entire life of the organisation." After this, the national committee of the organization resigned and Lotta was effectively disbanded.

=== Repentance ===
In 1998, Adriano Sofri wrote a letter to Calabresi's widow condemning both the execution of her husband and the media campaign instigated against him after the death of Pinelli by Lotta Continua, and, "in particular," the campaign's "completely degenerate part that turned into a real lynching."

After the open letter accusing Calabresi of the death of Pinelli was published in L'Espresso in June 1971, some signatories expressed their regret for having signed it. Carlo Ripa di Meana, formerly a PCI member and European Commissioner for the Environment, proclaimed in 2007 that he asks forgiveness from Signora Calabresi and her sons. In 2017, Eugenio Scalfari, formerly L'Espresso editor and co-founder of La Repubblica, expressed publicly to Calabresi's widow his "deep regret" for having signed. In 2021, journalist Paolo Mieli, appearing on television, said he feels "ashamed" for his signature. (Note: Mieli stated: "In those years, we really thought that the hand of the State was everywhere, even if that viewpoint in some cases did not add up. We thought that Pinelli was thrown out of the window. There was a climate of an impending coup d'état. I've done more than self-criticism; I'm ashamed. We made a mistake. Those were the years of 'I know who did it, I don't have proof but I know'." See Affari Italiani (2021).) Film director Folco Quilici and photographer Oliviero Toscani denied having affixed their signature to the document, in the first place, while Giampaolo Pansa explained in an editorial why he'd refused to sign it when it was presented to him. Journalist Domenico Porzio did not apologize but spoke of a time period when "we were young and wild."

=== Commemorations and reconciliations ===
On 14 May 2004, Carlo Azeglio Ciampi, President of the Italian Republic, presented Gemma Capra with the Medaglia d'Oro al Valor Civile in memoriam of Luigi Calabresi as a victim of terrorism.

In 2007, priest Ennio Innocenti commenced a public petition for the beatification of Calabresi. Cardinal Camillo Ruini found merit in the petition and it was forwarded to Milan Cardinal Dionigi Tettamanzi who asserted that such an action would be "premature" given that the figure of Calabresi still had a "divisive effect" on the city of Milan. In 2017, Cardinals Angelo Scola and Gaetano Vallini, respectively archbishops emeritus of Rome and Milan, commenced a new campaign to gather support for the beatification of Calabresi, whose death, they asserted, was in odium fidei, "in hatred of the faith." Pope Paul VI and then Pope John Paul II had spoken of Calabresi, after his assassination, as a "servant of God", the latter calling Calabresi "a witness of the Gospel and a heroic defender of the common good."

On 9 May 2009, during the Day of Commemoration of the Victims of Terrorism, Licia Rognini, Giuseppe Pinelli's widow, and Gemma Capra, the widow of Luigi Calabresi, met for the first time at the Quirinal Palace, invited by Giorgio Napolitano, President of the Italian Republic. In Napolitano's presence and before the gathered media, the two women shook hands. Pinelli's daughter was also invited. President Napolitano stated in his eulogy that "the democratic state must always and constantly remain close to [the] wounded families," adding that Giuseppe Pinelli is to be "respected and honoured," having been "victim twice: first of very heavy, unfounded suspicions and then of a sudden, absurd end." Pinelli and Capra were heard saying to each other, "We should've done this sooner." The rapprochement of the two familites was, said Napolitano, "a political and institutional gesture" over "a wound that cannot be separated from that of the seventeen who lost their lives in Piazza Fontana."

The story of the Piazza Fontana massacre and the deaths of Pinelli and Calabresi were the inspiration for Marco Tullio Giordana's 2012 film Romanzo di una strage (Novel of a massacre; released outside Italy as Piazza Fontana: The Italian Conspiracy), in which Calabresi was portrayed by Valerio Mastandrea, and also of the 2014 television miniseries Gli anni spezzati - Il commissario (The broken years - The commissioner), with Emilio Solfrizzi as protagonist.

On 17 May 2022, fifty years after Calabresi's killing, the day also when the case of Giorgio Pietrostefani's extradition request was heard in a Paris court, Calabresi's widow Gemma and their three children attended a series of commemorative events, from a morning ceremony at the police station where Calabresi had served to a gathering at the Gerolamo theater in Milan. In the evening event, the family members spoke of the past, with Gemma declaring that she holds no hatred for the culprits, having decided "a long time ago" to "make peace with life." Son Paolo spoke of his meeting with Leonardo Marino, the getaway driver: "It was a two-hour meeting. What are two hours in 50 years? [They could be] Anything. But [father] gave us an impulse not to stand still, without forgetting where we started from." Minister of Justice Marta Cartabia was present and spoke of "the lessons taught to everyone" by the Calabresi family.

== See also ==
- Years of Lead
- Strategy of tension
- Terrorism in Italy
- Red Brigades
- Armed, far-right organizations in Italy
