= Rosmarie Pierer =

German multimedia artist (born 1918)

- Born: 14 May 1918; Bernburg, Germany
- Died: 20 February 2012 (aged 93); Hamburg, Germany
- Occupations: Photographer, multimedia artist

Rosmarie Pierer was a German photographer and multimedia artist.

== Biography ==
Rosmarie Pierer was born in Bernburg in 1918. She studied arts and advertising and did an internship at a newspaper in Leipzig and in Neuweiler. In the late 1940s, she had a small photography studio in Göttingen. After World War II, Inge Feltrinelli was her friend and student, Pierer taught her the basics of photography and inspired to pursue a career in journalism.

In late 1949, Pierer moved to Hamburg where she became the photographer at the Thalia theatre. In 1952, Pierer was commissioned to produce a product demonstration for the Ministry of Agriculture – a multivision show using twelve projectors, controlled by light-reading devices via perforated strips. The show became a sensation; something like this had only been seen once before in Germany in a Kodak presentation. Her career was thriving; she had signed contracts with Beiersdorf, Deutsche Airbus, Philips, the Hamburg Chamber of Commerce, and others.

In 1976, she started working on video and cinema productions. She directed video films on topics of environmental protection and drug and AIDS prevention.

In the late 1990s, she opened a multimedia studio and began to be active on the Internet. In her 70s, she continued to offer her clients the most cutting-edge technological solutions – from interactive CD-ROMs to web design and content creation.
