= Giangiacomo Feltrinelli =

Italian publisher and businessman (1926–1972)

Marquis Giangiacomo Feltrinelli
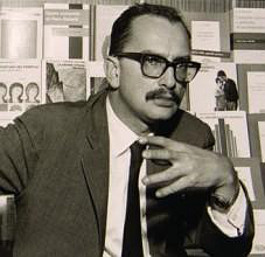
- Feltrinelli in the late 1960s
- Born: 19 June 1926; Milan, Lombardy, Italy
- Died: 14 March 1972 (aged 45); Segrate, Lombardy, Italy
- Other name: "Osvaldo"
- Occupations: Businessman, political activist
- Years active: 1945–1972
- Known for: European translations of Doctor Zhivago; publishing Lampedusa's The Leopard; founding Italy's biggest chain of bookstores; articles anticipating a fascist coup in Italy; patronage of left wing terrorist groups
- Political party: PSI (until 1947); PCI (1947–1958, lapsed)
- Other political affiliations: Gruppi di Azione Partigiana (Partisan Action Groups, 1970–1972)
- Spouses: Bianca dalle Nogare (m. 1947; div. 1956) Alessandra de Stefani (m. 1957; div. 1964) Inge Schönthal (m. 1964; div. 1967) Sibilla Melega (m. 1967)
- Children: Carlo Fitzgerald Feltrinelli (1962–)
- Military career
- Allegiance: Kingdom of Italy
- Branch: Italian Co-belligerent Army
- Service years: 1944–1945
- Rank: Soldier
- Unit: "Legnano" Combatant Group
- Conflicts: Italian Civil War

Giangiacomo Feltrinelli (Italian: [dʒanˈdʒaːkomo feltriˈnɛlli]; 19 June 1926 – 14 March 1972) was an influential Italian publisher, businessman, and political activist who was active in the period between the Second World War and Italy's Years of Lead. He founded a vast library of documents mainly in the history of international labour and socialist movements.

Feltrinelli is perhaps most famous for his decision to translate and publish Boris Pasternak's novel Doctor Zhivago in the West after the manuscript was smuggled out of the Soviet Union in the late 1950s. He died violently under mysterious circumstances in 1972.

== Early life ==
Giangiacomo Feltrinelli was born in 1926 into one of Italy's wealthiest families, perhaps originating in Feltre. His father, Carlo Feltrinelli, controlled numerous companies including Credito Italiano, Edison S.p.A. and Legnami Feltrinelli, which managed vast lumber holdings in central Europe, some having provided sleepers for the enormous extension of Italian railway tracks in the nineteenth century. Carlo died in 1935. At the instigation of Giangiacomo's monarchist mother, Giannalisa, Italian dictator Benito Mussolini had him created Marchese di Gargnano at the age of 12 by King Vittorio Emmanuele III. In 1940, Feltrinelli's mother married Luigi Barzini, editor of the Italian newspaper Corriere della Sera. During the Second World War, the family left the Villa Feltrinelli in Gargnano, north of Salò, to be occupied by Mussolini, and moved to Monte Argentario.

== World War II ==
The young Feltrinelli first took an interest in the living conditions of the poor and working class during discussions with the staff who ran his family's estate. He came to believe that under capitalism most people could never attain his privileges and were compelled to sell their labour for a pittance to industrialists and landowners. During the latter stages of the war, Feltrinelli joined the Italian Co-Belligerent Army's Combat Group "Legnano" and enrolled in the Italian Communist Party (PCI), fighting the invading German Wehrmacht and the remnants of Mussolini's Fascist regime.

In the post-war period, the PCI had a great deal of popular support and political influence; after 1948 it became the main opposition. Italy was in economic ruins and the party's previous opposition to Mussolini had gained it great popularity. The PCI was in coalition until 1947.

== Inheritance ==
Carlo Feltrinelli's will made Giangiacomo heir to three-quarters of his assets, which came fully under his control when he reached the age of 21 in 1947. Banca Unione (formerly Banca Feltrinelli) was controlled by Giangiacomo until 1968, when it was acquired by Michele Sindona. According to some interpretations, Sindona was pushed to buy out Feltrinelli by the Vatican Bank, a minority shareholder embarrassed by cohabitation with a communist partner.

== Library ==
From 1949 Feltrinelli collected documents for the Giangiacomo Feltrinelli Library in Milan, documenting the history of ideas, in particular those related to the development of the international labour and socialist movements. The Library later became an Institute; later still the Giangiacomo Feltrinelli Foundation, possessing some 200,000 rare and modern books, extensive collections of newspapers and periodicals (both historical and current), and over a million primary source materials.

== Publishing ==
Near the end of 1954, Feltrinelli established a publishing company in Milan, Giangiacomo Feltrinelli Editore. Its first published book was the autobiography of Jawaharlal Nehru, the first prime minister of India.

=== Dr. Zhivago ===
In late 1956, an Italian journalist showed Feltrinelli the manuscript of Doctor Zhivago by the Russian writer Boris Pasternak. Feltrinelli's Slavist advisor told him to publish the novel, stating that to not do so would "constitute a crime against culture". His son Carlo's biography of Feltrinelli records a correspondence between him and Pasternak as they successfully resisted clumsy attempts by the Soviet regime to halt publication of the novel. Doctor Zhivago immediately became an international bestseller.

Feltrinelli sold the film rights to Metro-Goldwyn-Mayer for $450,000. Produced in 1965, the resulting adaptation became one of the highest-grossing and critically acclaimed films of all time. The communist leadership in Moscow, which had not wanted the book published, criticised Feltrinelli, who in turn decided not to renew his PCI membership in 1957. While Feltrinelli remained on good terms with the PCI, party leaders were reluctant to be seen to condone criticism of the Soviet Union.

=== The Leopard ===
Feltrinelli Editore scored another coup in 1958 when it published a book rejected by every other significant Italian publisher: The Leopard by Giuseppe Tomasi di Lampedusa. Described by some as the greatest novel of the twentieth century, The Leopard centres on the Sicilian nobility during the Risorgimento of the mid-19th century, when the Italian middle class rose violently and formed a united Italy under Giuseppe Garibaldi and the House of Savoy.

Despite these successes, Feltrinelli Editore lost about 400 million lire a year on a turnover of 1.207 billion lire, as Feltrinelli believed in keeping his prices low for maximum readership access. Still, the Feltrinelli Libra bookstore chain had a nominal capital of 120 million lire in 1956. The following year, Feltrinelli built up a chain of retail outlets, which after his death became the largest in Italy; it had over a hundred bookshops. Feltrinelli Masonite, which he chaired, had a turnover of 1.421 billion lire in 1965. Another firm, which he advised on real estate development, had a capital of 400 million lire in 1970.

Whatever his own reading tastes, Feltrinelli was always keen to promote the avant-garde, including the works of the influential literary circle Group 63. He also took the risk of publishing and distributing novels banned under Italian obscenity laws, such as Henry Miller's Tropic of Cancer.

In 1960, Feltrinelli married German photographer Inge Schönthal, who gave birth to a son named Carlo. Inge eventually became the de facto head of Feltrinelli Editore as Feltrinelli came to devote himself to clandestine political activity, of which she disapproved. Mother and son still run the publishing house together today.

== Activism ==
In the post-war period, Feltrinelli had joined the Italian Socialist Party (PSI). However, in 1947 the PSI was engulfed in crisis following the departure of sections of its moderate wing, prompting Feltrinelli (alongside his new wife, Bianca) to rejoin the PCI instead. He remained a member of the party until 1958, when he left in solidarity with 'revisionist' criticism of the Hungarian Uprising and also because of certain conflicts that had emerged within the PCI regarding his publishing house's editorial policy, although he continued to maintain friendly relations with several of the party's leaders.

=== Third world activism ===
Feltrinelli spent the 1960s travelling the world and making links with various radical Third World leaders and guerrilla movements. In the Cuban house of the photographer Alberto Korda, Feltrinelli saw and was given Korda's iconic photo of Che Guevara. Within six months of Che's assassination, Feltrinelli sold over two million posters bearing the image. In 1964, Feltrinelli met Cuban prime minister Fidel Castro. In 1967, he went to Bolivia and met with Régis Debray.

Feltrinelli published the writings of figures such as Castro, Che and Ho Chi Minh, and a series of pamphlets on the unfolding insurgencies and wars in Southeast Asia and the Middle East. He was a close friend of the student leader Rudi Dutschke, whom he invited to convalesce in Italy after Dutschke was seriously wounded by an assassination attempt. Feltrinelli gave financial support to the Popular Front for the Liberation of Palestine, among other causes.

=== Guerrilla activity ===
In 1968, Feltrinelli went to Sardinia to make contact with left-wing and separatist groups on the island, intending to make Sardinia a socialist republic similar to Cuba and "liberate it from colonialism". His attempt to strengthen Graziano Mesina's rebel forces was eventually nullified by Italian military intelligence.

Feltrinelli increasingly advocated guerrilla activity in Italy. In 1970, fearing a right-wing coup d'etat, he founded the militant Gruppi di Azione Partigiana (Partisan Action Groups, or GAP). GAP would become Italy's second-largest militant organization to be formed during the Years of Lead, after the Red Brigades. Anticipating assassination attempts by the CIA or Mossad, Feltrinelli assumed a nom de guerre ("Osvaldo") and went underground.

== Death ==
On 15 March 1972, Feltrinelli was found dead at the foot of an electricity pylon at Segrate, near Milan, apparently killed by an explosive device he and other GAP members were planting the day before. Some 8,000 people attended Feltrinelli's funeral. His death, like his father's 37 years before, was viewed as suspicious by several intellectuals, including investigative journalist Camilla Cederna, but Barzini rejected the hypothesis of a state-sponsored assassination:

Yet is it very likely that a conspirator with the gifts of a great novelist or a great film-director was to be found among the secret agents? a plotter capable of staging a death so faithful to the victim—his past, his nature and his character?

In 1974, an audio recording found in a shelter of the Red Brigades described Feltrinelli as

sitting astride the pylon preparing the dynamite. At that time the first accomplice, half-way up the pylon, felt a strong and dry explosion but clung tightly to the pillar … He fell to the ground, looked upward and saw nothing, looked down and saw Osvaldo [Feltrinelli] rolling on the ground. His immediate impression was that Osvaldo had lost both his legs.

In 1979, during an anti-terrorist trial, the Red Brigades defendants read into the court record a signed statement that Feltrinelli

was engaged in an operation to sabotage electricity pylons intended to cause a blackout in a wide area of Milan … It was a technical error committed by him … which led to the fatal accident and the subsequent failure of the whole operation.

The defendants denied the thesis of the murder, claiming it was a commemoration of the publisher and his political ideas, and a critique addressed to the circles of the extra-parliamentary left who had tried to deny them. They also admitted that Feltrinelli was not obsessed with a neo-fascist coup, because he wanted to establish in Italy the armed struggle and was one of the first to have had contacts with the German Red Army Faction: finally they affirmed that the relationships between GAP and RB were characterized by the maximum correctness, without competitive spirit.

The trial ended with eleven convictions, seven acquittals, two prescriptions and nine amnesties (this legal sentence was largely confirmed in 1981).

== In cultural memory ==
- Senior Service, by Carlo Feltrinelli, 2001. This lengthy biography, written by Giangiacomo's son Carlo, was first published in Italian, and then translated into English.
- Feltrinelli, an 80-minute documentary by Alessandro Rossetto, was released in 2006.
- Feltrinelli, played by Fabrizio Parenti, appears in the 2012 film Piazza Fontana: The Italian Conspiracy (Romanzo di una strage) by Marco Tullio Giordana. The film is about the 1969 bomb explosion in Milan's Piazza Fontana, the subsequent fall to his death from a police window of an anarchist suspect, and the putative murder of Luigi Calabresi, the investigating police commissioner. In the film, he takes part personally in the discovery of Feltrinelli's body: Calabresi, in reality, directed the investigation from Milan.
- Feltrinelli's life story was the subject of the 2013 concept album and theatrical performance Praxis Makes Perfect by the group Neon Neon.
- Feltrinelli, his publishing, and his suspicious death are mentioned several times in The Flamethrowers, a novel by Rachel Kushner which is set during the Years of Lead.

== See also ==
- List of unsolved deaths
