= Erri De Luca =

Italian novelist, translator and poet

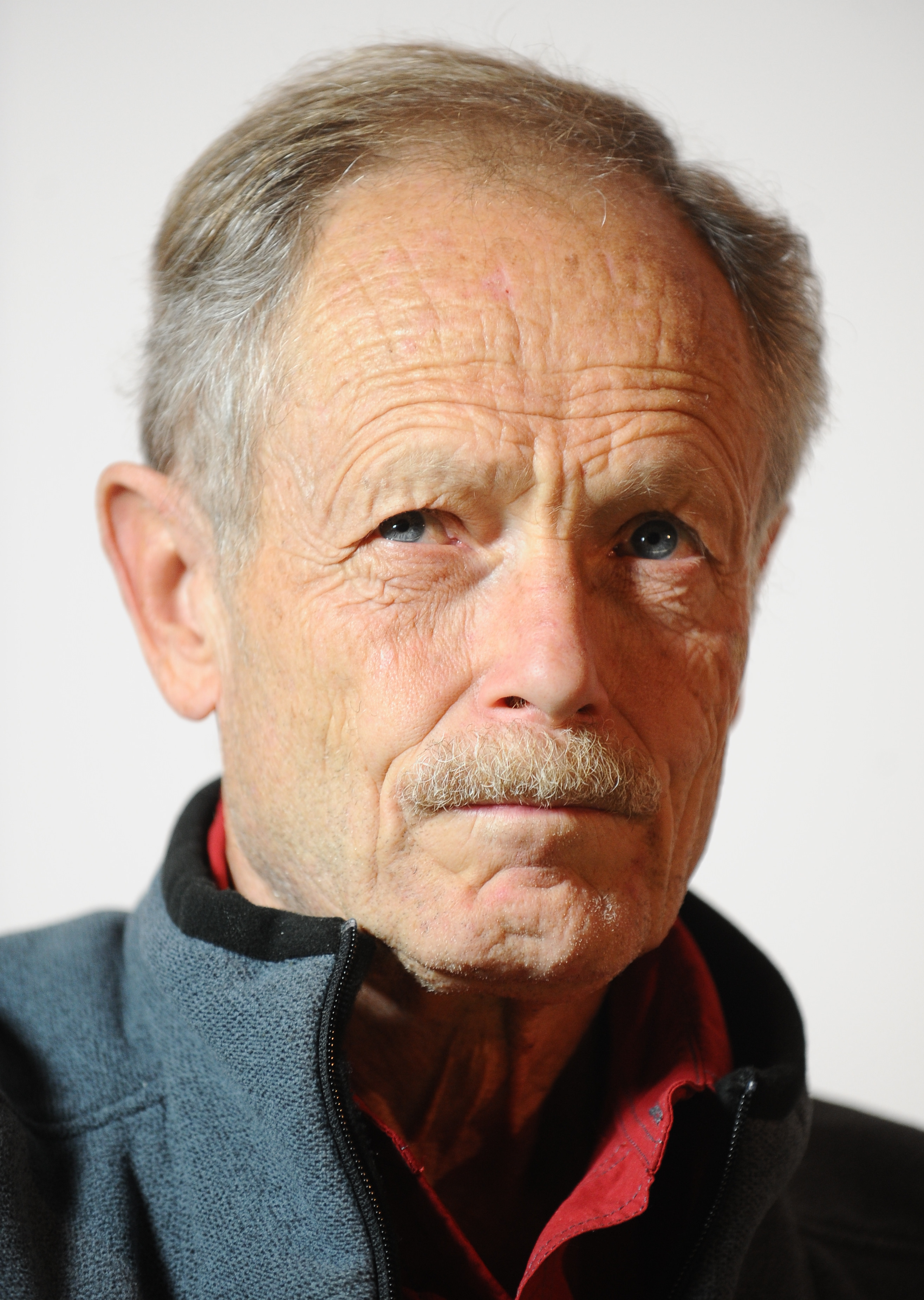
Erri De Luca

Enrico "Erri" De Luca (born 20 May 1950, Naples) is an Italian novelist, translator and poet. He has been recognized by critic Giorgio De Rienzo of Corriere della Sera as "the writer of the decade". He is also known for his opposition to the Lyon-Turin high speed train line, and is being sued for having called for its sabotage. On 19 October 2015, De Luca was cleared of inciting criminal damage. He reacted to the not-guilty verdict declaring that "An injustice has been avoided."

== Biography ==
Erri De Luca's original first name was Enrico ("Henry"). Erri is an Italian version of his uncle's name, "Harry".

Upon completing high school in 1968, Erri De Luca joined the radical left-wing movement Lotta Continua. After the organization's disbanding, he left his political involvement. He worked as a blue-collar worker at the Fiat factory in Turin and the Catania airport. He was also a truck driver and a mason, working at job sites in Italy, France, and Africa. He rode relief convoys in Yugoslavia during the war between 1993 and 1999.

Erri De Luca is self-taught in several languages, including Ancient Hebrew, Swahili, Russian and Yiddish. He has translated books of the Old Testament from Old Hebrew and written commentaries on the Sacred Texts as a "non-believer". De Luca embarked on an independent study of Ancient Hebrew in 1983, driven by a desire to delve into the original language of the Bible. This endeavor allowed him to engage deeply with the texts, leading to personal translations of several biblical books into Italian, including Exodus, Jonah, Ecclesiastes, and Ruth. His approach to these translations is characterized by focusing on the literary and historical aspects rather than theological interpretations. He has published over 100 books and numerous short stories and poem collections. His work has been translated into more than 30 languages.

He appeared in a cameo role (of a mechanic) in the film L'isola, by Costanza Quadriglio. Erri De Luca's debut as a screenwriter and leading actor was in the short film Di là del Vetro (Beyond the Glass), presented at the Venice Film Festival 2011 in Italy, with Its World Premiere. "A night-time conversation between a man and his mother and a trip down memory lane through the phantoms of life. Erri De Luca opens the door to his house, transporting us into the universe of the past."

Again, with "The Nightshift Belongs to the Stars," he was a screenwriter and actor directed by Edoardo Ponti and produced by OH!PEN. The short film was on the shortlist for the 2013 Academy Awards and won the 2013 Tribeca Film Festival award. In the same year, Erri De Luca began writing the story for the documentary film, "Trees that Walk." In 2014, he wrote and interpreted "A Musical Imprinting," a musical biography about his life. OH!PEN produced both documentaries.

In 2018, he co-produced the movie "Happy Times", directed by Michael Mayer.

In 2024, he wrote and interpreted the short movie "The Experimental Age," produced by Soul Film Production and OH!PEN. “What does this age resemble?” De Luca wonders. “It resembles climbing up a mountain forest. In the dense conifers, little light enters; I only see what is close around me, but higher up, they thin out, clearings open, there is more light. In this age, at the top of the forest, I see far, glimpses of the future, not mine, the one without me."

A significant portion of his writing has been adapted into theater plays.

De Luca is a mountain climber. A reclusive character, he currently lives in the countryside of Rome.

In 2011, he created the Fondazione Erri De Luca with Paola Porrini Bisson. The Foundation is a non-profit organization dedicated to cultural and social initiatives. Inspired by Erri De Luca's literary and humanitarian vision, it promotes literature, human rights, and solidarity through publications, events, and community engagement.

De Luca maintains a daily practice of reading passages from the Hebrew Bible each morning. Despite his non-religious stance, he finds personal and intellectual enrichment in this practice.

De Luca’s civic engagement is inseparable from his writing. Over the years, he has participated in volunteer missions and, more recently, personally delivered humanitarian aid to Ukraine, continuing his lifelong commitment to solidarity and social responsibility.

== Literature ==
Although he had never stopped writing since he was 20, his first book, "Non ora, non qui" ("Not now, not here"), was published in 1989. Many more books followed, best-sellers in Italy, France, and Israel, his work being translated and published in Spain, Portugal, Germany, Sweden, the Netherlands, the USA, Brazil, Poland, Norway, Denmark, Romania, Greece, Lithuania, and more. He has himself translated several books of the Bible into Italian, including Exodus, Jonah, Ecclesiastes, and Ruth, and explored various aspects of Judaism, as a non-believer.

In France, he received the France Culture Prize in 1994 for Aceto, arcobaleno, the Laure Bataillon Award in 2002 for Tre cavalli and, also in 2002, the Fémina Étranger for Montedidio, translated in English as God's Mountain. In 2010 he was given the German international literary Petrarca-Preis. He was a jury member at the Cannes Festival in 2003. In 2013, he received the European Prize for Literature. In 2016, he received European Book Prize for his novel "Le plus et le moins". In 2020, he received Le prix André Malraux.

Erri De Luca write for various newspapers (La Repubblica, Il Corriere della Sera Il Mattino, Avvenire), and other magazines.

His latest book, published in collaboration with Rabbi Haim Baharier, is "La Genesi" (Genesis).

== Works ==
- Non ora, non qui, Feltrinelli, 1989
- Una nuvola come tappeto, Feltrinelli, 1991
- Aceto, Arco baleno, Feltrinelli, 1992
- I colpi dei sensi, Fahrenheit 451, Milano, 1993
- Prove di risposta, Edizioni Nuova Cultura, Roma, 1994
- In alto a sinistra, Feltrinelli, 1994
- Pianoterra, articoli, Qiqajon, Bose, Magnano, 1995
- Il cronista scalzo e altri scritti, Legatoria del Sud
- Alzaia, Feltrinelli, 1997
- Ora prima, Qiqajon, Bose, Magnano, 1997
- Tu, mio, Feltrinelli, 1998 (Me, You, Other Press)
- Tufo, Dante & Descartes, 1999
- Tre cavalli, Feltrinelli, 1999 (Three Horses, Other Press)
- Un papavero rosso all'occhiello senza coglierne il fiore, Interattiva, 2000
- Montedidio, Feltrinelli, 2002 (God's Mountain, Other Press)
- Opera sull'acqua e altre poesie (poetry), Einaudi, 2002
- Lettere da una citta' bruciata, Dante & Descartes, 2002
- Nocciolo d'oliva, EMP, 2002
- Il contrario di uno, Feltrinelli, 2003
- Immanifestazione, Dante & Descartes, 2003
- Morso di luna nuova. Racconto per voci in tre stanze, Mondadori, 2004
- Precipitazioni, Dante & Descartes, 2004
- Chisciottimista, Dante & Descartes, 2005
- In nome della madre, Feltrinelli, 2006
- Sulla traccia di Nives, Mondadori, 2006
- Napolide, Dante & Descartes, 2006
- Sottosopra (with Gennaro Matino), Mondadori, 2007
- lettere fraterne (with Izet Sarajilic), Dante & Descartes, 2007
- L'isola è una conchiglia, La Conchiglia, 2008
- Almeno cinque (with Gennaro Matino), Feltrinelli, 2008
- L'ospite incallito (poetry), Einaudi, 2008
- Il cielo in una stalla, Infinito, 2008
- Tentativi di scoraggiamento (a darsi alla scrittura), Dante & Descartes, 2009 (Attempts at discouragement (when taking up writing))
- Penultime notizie circa Ieshu/Gesù, Messaggero, 2009
- Il giorno prima della felicità, Feltrinelli, 2009 (The Day Before Happiness, Other Press)
- Il peso della farfalla, Feltrinelli, 2009
- Tu non c'eri, Dante & Descartes, 2010
- Rivolte inestirpabili, Forum Edizioni, 2010
- E disse, Feltrinelli, 2011
- Le sante dello scandalo, La Giuntina, 2011
- I pesci non chiudono gli occhi, Feltrinelli, 2011
- Il Turno di Notte lo Fanno le Stelle, Feltrinelli, 2012 ("The Nightshift Belongs to the Stars")
- Il torto del soldato, Feltrinelli, 2012
- Il Turno di Notte lo fanno le Stelle, OH!PEN Feltrinelli, 2012
- La doppia Vita dei Numeri, Feltrinelli, 2012
- The Nightshift Belongs to the Stars, Feltrinelli, 2012
- Ti sembra il Caso?, Feltrinelli 2013
- Storia di Irene, Feltrinelli 2013
- The Crime of a Soldier, Feltrinelli
- La musica Provata (A Musical Imprinting), Feltrinelli 2014
- La parola contraria, Feltrinelli 2015
- Il più e il meno, Feltrinelli 2016
- La Faccia delle nuvole, Feltrinelli 2016
- La Natura Esposta, Feltrinelli 2016
- Diavoli Custodi, Feltrinelli 2017
- Il giro dell’oca, Feltrinelli 2018
- Impossibile, Feltrinelli 2019
- A Grandezza Naturale, Feltrinelli 2021
- Spizzichi e Bocconi, Feltrinelli 2022
- Cercatori d'acqua, Casa Editrice Giuntina 2023
- A Schiovere, Feltrinelli 2023
- Discorso per un amico, Feltrinelli 2024
- L'età sperimentale, Feltrinelli 2024
- La Genesi, Feltrinelli 2025
- Prime Persone, Feltrinelli 2025

== Translations by the author ==
- Esodo/Nomi, Feltrinelli, 1994
- Giona/Iona, Feltrinelli, 1995
- kohelet/Ecclesiaste, Feltrinelli, 1996
- Il libro di Ruth, Feltrinelli, 1999
- Salmo secondo ovvero Elogio del massimo timore, in Micromega, 2000
- Noah Ansheldell'altro mondo (of Dovid Katz), translation from Yiddish, Dante & Descartes, 2002
- Vita di Sansone dal libro Giudici/Shoftim, Feltrinelli, 2002
- Vita di Noè/Noa, Feltrinelli, 2004
- L'ospite di pietra. L'invito a morte di Don Giovanni. Piccola tragedia in versi, Feltrinelli, 2005
- Canto del popolo yiddish messo a morte (of Ytshak Katzenelson), Mondadori, 2009
