= Adriano Sofri =

Italian far-left former terrorist, journalist and writer

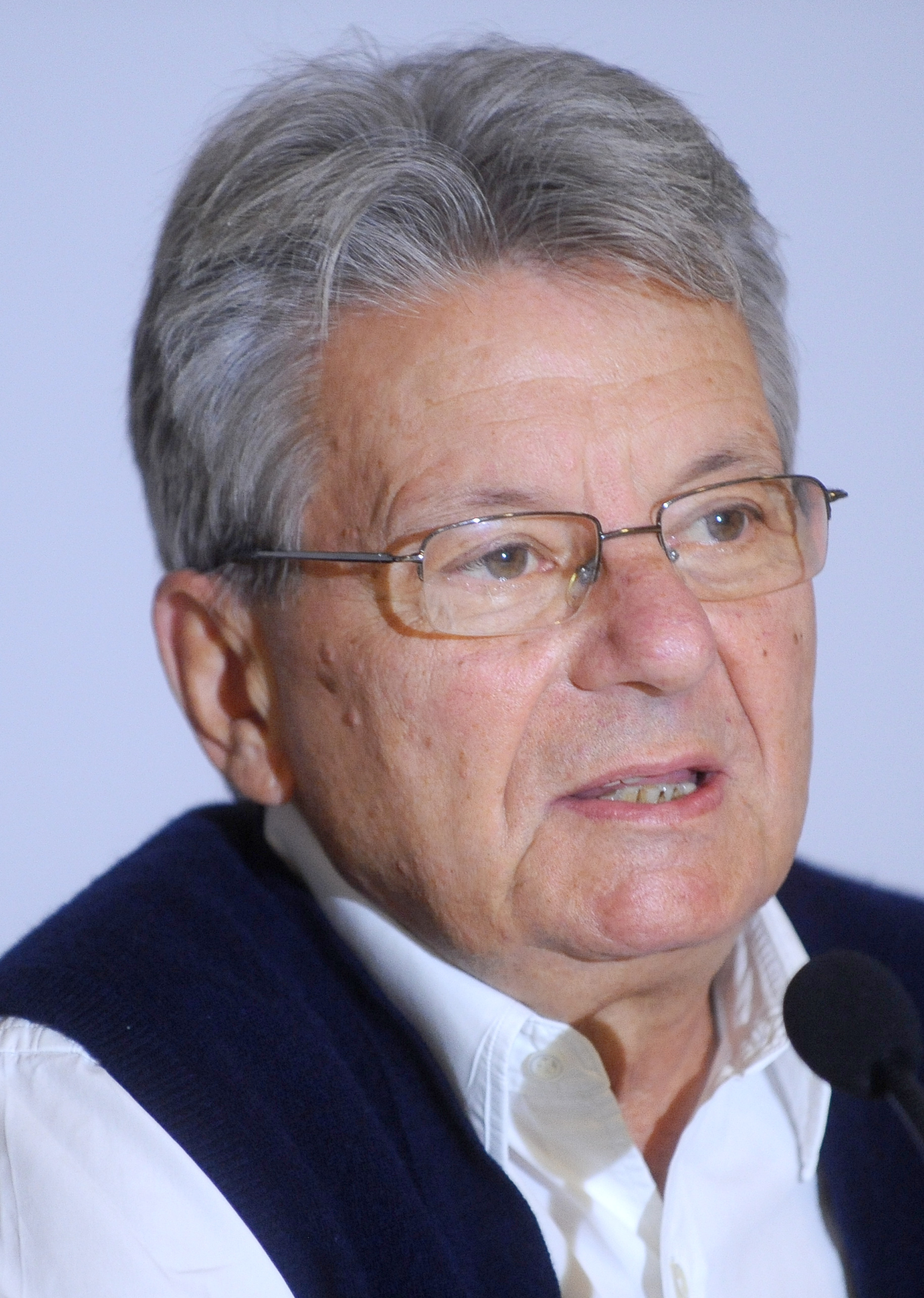
- Sofri in 2014
- Born: 1 August 1942 (age 84); Trieste, Italy
- Occupations: Politician; Journalist; Writer

Adriano Sofri (born 1 August 1942) is an Italian far-left former politician, journalist and writer. He was convicted for ordering the assassination of Milan Police officer Luigi Calabresi in 1972. This was one of the most prominent murders during the period of social turmoil and political violence in Italy known as the "Years of Lead". Spanning from the late 1960s until the late 1980s, they were marked by a wave of both far-left and far-right incidents of political terrorism.

During the 1960s and 1970s, Sofri was the leader of the far-left militant organization called Lotta Continua ("Continuous Struggle"), together with Giorgio Pietrostefani. Sofri spent his sentence between 1997 and 2012. In the meantime, he wrote for various Italian national newspapers, such as Il Foglio, La Repubblica, and Panorama. He is a daily columnist for Il Foglio still nowadays.

== Calabresi murder and background ==
On 12 December 1969, the Piazza Fontana bombing took place in Milan, killing 17 people and wounding 88. Among those arrested and investigated, there was the militant anarchist Giuseppe Pinelli. On 15 December 1969, while in police custody, Pinelli fell from a fourth-floor window of the police building in Milan. The policemen present in the interrogation room claimed that Pinelli committed suicide, but many leftist circles believed him to have been murdered.

Despite the established fact that Calabresi wasn't even in the room at the moment of Pinelli's death, he became the target of an extensive left-wing media campaign, which accused him of manslaughter and lasted years. It was led especially by the newspaper of Lotta Continua (directed by Sofri at the time) and by the left-wing mainstream weekly L'Espresso. Lotta Continua newspaper explicitly wrote that Calabresi had to be "shot dead". [Citations missing]

An initial investigation in 1970 ruled Pinelli's death as an accident.

On the morning of 17 May 1972, Luigi Calabresi was shot outside his home while going to work. [Citations missing]

== First trial, retrial and European Supreme Court – escape of Pietrostefani ==
On 2 May 1990 in Milan, Sofri was convicted and sentenced to serve 22 years in prison. Pietrostefani and Bompressi also received 22 years, while Marino was sentenced to 11 years due to his collaboration.

In July 1991, the Court of Appeal of Milan upheld the convictions, but these were cancelled the following year by the Supreme Court of Cassation asking for a new proceeding. (Note: The Italian Supreme Court of Cassation is separated from the Italian Constitutional Court, being the facto a third degree of judgment in the Italian system. It has the power to confirm or reject a judgment made by a local Court of Appeal. In order to reach a definitive sentence, basically in every trial the Court of Cassation must sentence a confirmation) With a new judgment by another section of the Court of Appeal of Milan, Sofri and the others were acquitted in 1993. Unusually, when the trial arrived for the second time at the Supreme Court, the sentence was cancelled again and a third proceeding was requested. It took place and Sofri was convicted with the partners by yet another section of the Court of Appeal of Milan in 1995. Finally, the Supreme Court in its third review confirmed this judgment, ending the trial with a conviction in 1997.

After 2 years of prison, in 1999 Sofri and Pietrostefani asked and obtained by the Supreme Court a temporary suspension of the sentence and a retrial. This is an exceptional measure, quite unusual in the Italian justice system, and it was granted because of the complicated legal path and the high political pressure on the first trial at the time. Meanwhile, they were released from prison and were waiting for the hearings; these were held by the Court of Appeal of Venice, the only one accepting to do the procedure at the time. In 2000 the Court celebrated a new trial and sentenced a confirmation of the convictions, later ratified by the Supreme Court. While Sofri accepted the sentence and returned to prison, Pietrostefani had already fled in France. He remained fugitive and never came back to serve its sentence, because French authorities refused to extradite him under the Mitterrand doctrine.

In 2003 the European Court of Human Rights refused yet another appeal made by Sofri and Pietrostefani for another retrial, calling it "inadmissible" and sentencing that their trial had been fair: "the trial inspected [by us] did not deteriorated the rights of the defense" and "did not deteriorated the equity of the proceeding".

== Opinion movement for presidential pardon ==
Throughout all the proceedings there was a large opinion movement in favour of Sofri, made by relevant politicians, intellectuals and artists such as Dario Fo, Erri De Luca, Carlo Ginzburg, Giuliano Ferrara, Gad Lerner, Luigi Ciotti, Walter Veltroni, Piero Fassino, judge Ferdinando Imposimato, Marco Pannella.

At the end of November 2005, Adriano Sofri suffered from Boerhaave syndrome while in prison. He was moved to the hospital and lots of national figures asked the President of the Republic to give him a pardon. However Justice Minister Roberto Castelli refused to make the request to the President. After the defeat of Silvio Berlusconi at the April 2006 election, the new government's Justice Minister Clemente Mastella announced that Sofri could be pardoned. However, Sofri refused to make a formal request, saying the request by himself would have been like an admission of guilt. The Justice Minister commented: "The truth is that 34 years after the events Sofri is a very sick person to whom one can offer a spontaneously humane gesture". In the end Sofri did not receive a pardon, but from 2007 he was allowed to serve his sentence under house arrest for medical reasons. The 22-year sentence ended in January 2012.

== See also ==
- Years of lead (Italy)
- Lotta Continua
- Red Brigades
