= Feltrinelli (publisher) =

Italian publishing company

Giangiacomo Feltrinelli Editore
- Founded: 1954
- Founder: Giangiacomo Feltrinelli
- Country of origin: Italy
- Headquarters location: Milan
- Publication types: Books
- Official website: www.feltrinellieditore.it

Giangiacomo Feltrinelli Editore is an Italian publishing company founded in 1954 by Giangiacomo Feltrinelli. As of 2026, it ranks fifth among Italy’s largest publishing houses.

== History ==
=== Foundation and early years ===
In 1949, Giangiacomo Feltrinelli worked at the Cooperativa del Libro Popolare, a publishing house founded by the Italian Communist Party. Its principal book series was Universale Economica, a collection of works by Isabel Allende, Alessandro Baricco, Stefano Benni, Jonathan Coe, Daniel Pennac, José Saramago, Antonio Tabucchi, and others. The publisher targeted a vast audience of readers and offered its books at a very moderate price of 100 lire. In five years, it released more than 200 titles, but had to cease operations in 1954 due to the financial crisis. The experience and the ideas accumulated in these years Giangiacomo Feltrinelli used to establish a publishing house of his own.

In 1955, Feltrinelli released two first titles: an Autobiography by Jawaharlal Nehru and the Scourge of the Swastika by Lord Russel. The success hit the new publisher very soon, when in 1957 it published Boris Pasternak's Doctor Zhivago, followed by The Leopard by Giuseppe Tomasi di Lampedusa in 1958. Both books immediately became international bestsellers.

The late 1950s marked a period of great success for Feltrinelli: it had earned a reputation as Italy’s most popular and fashionable publishing house, unafraid to publish books that its competitors would not even have dared to dream of.

In the 1960s, Feltrinelli published titles across a wide range of genres and disciplines: the 38-volume Encyclopaedia Feltrinelli Fischer, a 11-volume The Modern Art History by Giorgio Candeloro, a 10-volume translation of the New Oxford History of Music, along with Henry Miller Tropic of Cancer and Tropic of Capricorn.

Another great success for the publisher was the 1967 release of One Hundred Years of Solitude by Gabriel García Márquez. From the mid-1960s onwards, Gian Giacomo Feltrinelli became increasingly involved in political life and grew close to far-left radicals, the militant Gruppi di Azione Partigiana (Partisan Action Groups, or GAP). He was found dead on the 14th of March, 1972, at the foot of an electricity pylon at Segrate, near Milan, presumably killed by an explosive device he and other GAP members were planting the day before.

=== After the death of Feltrinelli ===
The publishing house remained operational even after the death of the founder, controlled and managed by the widow Inge Feltrinelli and, later, their son Carlo (born in 1962).

In 1989, the publisher launched Feltrinelli International, a bookshop chain presented in major touristic centers.

In 1995, Feltrinelli Group acquired Ricordi Media Stores, a chain of music and multimedia stores. In 2001, Feltrinelli purchased RCS Libri, an Italian bookstore chain. In the same year, the Group launched its web shop.

In 2023, Feltrinelli made a number of acquisitions: it purchased 100% of Scuola Holden, the SEM publishing house and a 10% stake in Adelphi.

In 2024, Feltrinelli launched Gramma, a new imprint dedicated to modern literature. In 2025, Feltrinelli Group acquired Codice Edizioni, a Torinese publisher founded back in 2003. In May of the same year, Feltrinelli Group announced launching Night&Day, a new publishing house dedicated solely to the genre of romance.

== Imprints ==
Feltrinelli imprints include:

- Feltrinelli
  - Universale Economica Feltrinelli
  - Feltrinelli Zoom
  - Feltrinelli KIDS
  - Fox Crime Feltrinelli
- Gribaudo
- Kowalski
- Marsilio
  - Sonzogno
- Urra
- Apogeo
  - Apogeo Sushi
- SEM
- Crocetti
- Editorial Anagrama

== Bookstores ==
Besides publishing, the company also owns a bookstore chain called LaFeltrinelli. The first store opened in 1957 in Pisa, followed by Milan (1957), Genoa (1959), Florence (1962), Rome (1964), and others.

As of 2018, the chain exceeded 130 stores in Italy.

Fondazione Feltrinelli, the biggest store of the chain that also hosts theatre shows, live music, open debates, lectures, and workshops, is located in Milan on viale Pasubio, 5.

In 2019, Feltrinelli opened the highest bookstore in Europe – located at 3466 m on Mont Blanc's Punta Helbronner, the shop offers a selection of more than 300 titles about mountains and mountaineering.

== Literature ==
- Giocondi, Michele (2018). Breve storia dell’editoria italiana (1861-2018) con 110 schede monografiche delle case editrici di ieri e di oggi. Dai fratelli Treves a Jeff Bezos. ISBN 9788833631196.
