= Pietro Calogero =

Italian magistrate (1939–2026)

- Born: 28 December 1939; Pace del Mela, Italy
- Died: 6 April 2026 (aged 86); Padua, Italy
- Education: University of Messina
- Occupation: Magistrate

Pietro Calogero (28 December 1939 – 6 April 2026) was an Italian magistrate.

== Life and career ==
A graduate of the University of Messina, he was responsible for the arrest of numerous militants of the Autonomia Operaia movement, such as Antonio Negri, Oreste Scalzone, and Franco Piperno. From 2009 to 2015, he was president of the Corte d'appello di Venezia.

Calogero died in Padua on 6 April 2026, at the age of 86.
