= Severino Santiapichi =

Italian magistrate and writer (1926–2016)

- Born: 26 May 1926; Scicli, Italy
- Died: 16 September 2016 (aged 90); Modica, Italy
- Occupations: Magistrate, writer

Severino Santiapichi (26 May 1926 – 16 September 2016) was an Italian magistrate and writer.

Born in Scicli, Ragusa, he was the president of the Courts of Assize in Rome for about 20 years, notably presiding over the Aldo Moro trial in 1978 and the Pope John Paul II assassination attempt trial in 1981. He was also, for several years, vice president of the Supreme Court in Somalia. After the retirement, he wrote several non-fiction novels and was professor at the Kore University of Enna.

He published several works (including The Reasons of Others, Milan, Sugarco, 1988; Romanzo di un paese, Milan, Rizzoli, 1995; The Jewel Serpent and the Hyena of the Savannah, Iuculano, 2007), in which he often recalls his experiences as a magistrate and judge.
