= Giorgio Pietrostefani =

Giorgio Pietrostefani (born 1943) was a leader of Lotta Continua. In 1988 the pentito Leonardo Marino accused him (along with Adriano Sofri) of ordering the 1972 murder of Luigi Calabresi. Pietrostafani was convicted in 1997, along with Sofri, Ovidio Bompressi, and Marino himself (who went free in exchange for his testimony). While free pending an appeal, Pietrostefani fled to France, which refused to extradite him under the Mitterrand doctrine. In 2021 the French government arrested him, along with six other left-wing activists convicted of crimes in Italy. However, in 2023 France's highest court refused to extradite him.
