= Sabino Acquaviva =

Italian sociologist and writer (1927–2015)

- Born: 29 April 1927; Padua, Italy
- Died: 29 December 2015 (aged 88); Padua, Italy

Sabino Acquaviva (29 April 1927 – 29 December 2015) was an Italian sociologist. He was chair of the Department of Sociology between 1985 and 1988 and president of the School of Political Science of University of Padua between 1977 and 1978. He was also visiting professor at All Souls College, Oxford and at the University of Nice, scriptwriter, and novelist. He is mostly well-known for his studies about secularization and the decline of religion in Western Europe.

Acquaviva died on 29 December 2015 in his hometown of Padua, Italy.
