= Marco Donat-Cattin =

Italian terrorist

- Born: 28 September 1953; Turin, Italy
- Died: 19 June 1988 (aged 34) near Verona, Italy
- Occupation: Terrorist
- Organization: Prima Linea

Marco Donat-Cattin (28 September 1953 – 19 June 1988) was an Italian terrorist. He was a founding member of Prima Linea, a far-left terrorist organization.

== Biography ==
Donat-Cattin was born in Turin, the son of trade unionist and future Christian Democracy minister Carlo Donat-Cattin.

After having had a son when he was just 17 and later separating from the mother, he frequented the faculty of jurisprudence. In 1974 he found a job as library carer at a secondary school in Turin, where he met future terrorist Claudio Sandalo.

Starting from 1976, he participated in the establishment of Prima Linea, becoming a member of its national council. On 29 January 1979, he took part in the operation that led to the assassination in Milan, together with Sergio Segio, of judge Emilio Alessandrini. He also participated in the shooting of bar owner Carmine Civitate in Turin on 18 July 1979.

Thanks to the revelations of Prima Linea's pentito Roberto Sandalo, he was identified as one of the organizations' main members by the Italian police. Donat-Cattin was however able to escape to France. This caused a national scandal after his father, then vice-secretary of Christian Democracy (the relative majority party in Italy at the time), was accused of having helped him to cross the frontier. Francesco Cossiga, another DC member who at the time was prime minister, was also suspected and underwent an official inquiry of the Italian Parliament, which however resulted with a majority vote to archive any possible probe Donat-Cattin was extradited from France in 1981.

Thanks to a special law which granted reduction of sentences for dissociates from terrorist organizations and for collaborators with justice, Marco Donat-Cattin obtained house arrest in October 1985 after having been acquitted (due to insufficient evidence) from the assassination of criminologist Alfredo Paolella, bearing in mind that a key element of dissociation from terrorism was the admission of guilt for acts committed by the individual who had freely decided to dissociate. He was freed in May 1987 after having served a community-service term as a re-educator for drug addicts.

He was struck and killed by a motorist on a highway near Verona in 1988 while he was trying to rescue a woman who had remained entrapped in another car crash. At his public funerals, Italian priest Don Mazzi highlighted the itinerary of Marco Donat-Cattin from the dark years of communist-driven terrorism to his ultimate "sacrifice" to save a life. In 2018, the daughter of Aldo Moro, the Italian political leader kidnapped and killed by the Red Brigades, Maria Fida Moro, reacted to a controversial statement made by a former terrorist on the 40th anniversary of his father's murder by indicating that the only former terrorist that she had respect for had been Marco Donat-Cattin, who would have wanted "to be cancelled from the world and who died trying to give back to others part of what he had taken away".
