= Prima Linea =

Italian Marxist–Leninist terrorist group

Front Line
- Prima Linea
- Leaders: Roberto Sandalo; Marco Donat-Cattin; Michele Viscardi; Enrico Galmozzi; Fabrizio Giai; Sergio Segio; Susanna Ronconi; Diego Forastieri; Roberto Rosso; Maurice Bignami; Bruno La Ronga; Giulia Borelli; Silviera Russo
- Dates active: 1976–1983
- Active regions: Italy
- Ideology: Communism; Marxism–Leninism
- Wars: Years of Lead

Prima Linea (Italian for 'Front Line') was a far-left Italian Marxist–Leninist terrorist group, active in the country from the late 1970s until the early 1980s.

== Context ==
Following the 1969–70 large-scale series of industrial action in Northern Italy, the acts of civil disobedience and mass demonstrations often turned to violent confrontations between leftist militants and the law enforcement authorities of the Italian state. A period of unprecedented social conflict began in the urban centers of Italy, with acts of violence carried out almost daily by both right- and left-wing organizations. Many militants from both extremes turned to urban guerrilla warfare, officially designated as terrorism.

== Background and creation ==
A movement of autonomist ideology was formulating among leftist youth in 1974, the same year that the organization Comitati comunisti per il potere operaio ("Communist Committees for Worker Power") moved to establish a "military network". During the period between the spring and autumn of 1974, there was intense internal discourse among the ranks of the extra-parliamentary left organization Lotta Continua ("Continuous Struggle") about its future course. Some militants, mostly members of the group's security service, and particularly those based in Milan, Turin, Naples, and Brianza, criticized the "too intellectual line" ostensibly followed by Lotta. They proposed instead a "more interventionist, insurrectionist initiative". The proposal was essentially equivalent to Lotta joining the "armed struggle" and, as such, was rejected by the leadership, a development that led to a split in the ranks. During approximately the same time, some former members of Potere Operaio ("Workers' Power"), which had dissolved itself the previous year, came together with two groups of Milanese militants who had left Lotta Continua. By 1975, some of those who'd left Lotta had established connection and co-operation with militants from other formations of the extra-parliamentary left, besides Potere Operaio. They'd also began contacts with the people publishing the magazine of political discourse Senza Tregua ("Hard Target"), which was promoting "militant anti-fascism". In the autumn of 1976, and after numerous meetings, three formations of organized "military and insurrectionist combat" emerged: Comitati comunisti rivoluzionari ("Revolutionary Communist Committees"), Unità comuniste combattenti ("Communist Combat Units"), and Prima Linea.

== Ideology and structure ==
According to analysis by the Italian state's internal security services, Prima Linea, instead of the "state-centric" approach, based on the "class-against-state" worldview of other militant groups, and particularly of the Red Brigades, supported a "social concept of the class war" shaped as a "historical conjunction between a fighting organization and the armed spontaneism of the masses". Therefore, rather than being the "vanguard of the working-class party", the Front Line aspired to "represent the vanguard component" of the masses, in "direct contact" with them.

Hence, the name itself of the organization, representing a "semi-militarized force", dedicated to fight against ideological opponents and "defend communist comrades". Defining itself as a "pluralist and flat formation", Linea aimed to be less sectarian than the "military verticalism" of the Red Brigades and, in fact, far from the "elitist logic" of Leninists. Linea co-founder Enrico "Chicco" Galmozzi, wrote in a 2019 book that they attached "importance" to have workers inside the organization and "roots" in the factories.

Linea's leaders were Roberto Sandalo, Marco Donat-Cattin, Sergio D'Elia, Michele Viscardi, Enrico Galmozzi, Fabrizio Giai, Sergio Segio, Susanna Ronconi, Diego Forastieri, Roberto Rosso, Maurice Bignami, Bruno La Ronga, Giulia Borelli, and Silviera Russo. The organization, depending on the operation, sometimes used other names, such as Comitati Comunisti Combattenti ("Communist Combatant Committees"), Brigate Comuniste Combattenti ("Communist Fighting Brigades"), and Ronde Proletarie ("Proletarian patrols"), the latter name denoting the organization Ronde armate proletarie that had temporarily disbanded after assassinating lawyer and MSI supporter Enrico Pedenovi.

== Major actions ==
The first time the organization acted militarily was in 1976, a year when other armed formations also appeared, such as Nuovi partigiani, Formazioni comuniste armate, and Potere comunista. On 29 November 1976, a group of five Linea members in Turin attacked the headquarters of the Fiat group. Three men and two women, all armed with pistols and assault rifles, stormed the Fiat offices, chained the employees present there, "expropriated" all the company money they found on the premises, and left, after writing with spray paint the name Prima Linea on the walls. The leaflet they left behind read in part as follows:

We are not an emanation of other armed organizations, such as the Red Brigades or the NAPs [the Armed Proletarian Nuclei], but a union of guerrilla groups that have until today operated under different acronyms, our aim being to create and organize armed proletarian power.

Previous to that attack, the Linea grouping had committed its first assassination. On 29 April 1976, Bruno La Ronga, Giovanni Stefan, Pietro Del Giudice, and Enrico Galmozzi, at the time militants in Lotta Continua who, as was subsequently revealed, had also moved on to the armed struggle, in Prima Linea, ambushed in a gas station and killed Enrico Pedenovi, lawyer and member of the Italian Social Movement party. The attack took place on the first anniversary of the assassination of neofascist student Sergio Ramelli by members of Avanguardia Operaia. Pedenovi's assassination was possibly in retaliation to the fatal stabbing of communist activist Gaetano Amoroso by neofascists two days before. The next year, on 12 March 1977, a Linea unit assassinated 29-year old policeman Giuseppe Ciotta, in Turin.

In the spring of 1977, Enrico Galmozzi and six workers in the Magneti Marelli and Falck factories were arrested in Val Grande, above Verbania, while training and exercising in the use of arms. The episode, according to Sergio Segio, demonstrated that "arming the workers was not some abstract political propaganda but a reality concretely in place." In April, a number of Linea members met at San Michele a Torri, near Florence, to debate the organization's statutes and its internal structure.

In July of the same year, a Milanese unit robbed an armory shop in Tradate, in the province of Varese, and took forty pistols and some rifles. When they were getting into a car, the shop owner, Luigi Speroni, having freed himself from his bonds, came out of the store and started firing at the car with a shotgun. One member of the unit, Romano "Valerio" Tognini (Note: Tognini had chosen "Valerio" as his nom de guerre in honor of Communist partisan Walter Audisio. See Tassinari (2016).) was killed instantly while another was seriously injured. The unit abandoned the lifeless body of Tognini in the woods. In a phone call to an Ansa journalist, the attackers identified themselves as "the communist fighting organization Prima Linea." They also gave the name of their fallen comrade, who was unrecognizable from the shooting. Tognini, the first member of Linea to be killed, was described in the media as a "quiet person," a Banco di Roma employee always "conservatively dressed" who did not seem to have any interest in politics.

On 20 January 1978, a group led by Sergio D'Elia, while attempting to liberate fellow members held at the Murate prison, faced a police patrol. In the firefight that followed, officer Dario Atzeni was hit by four bullets but subsequently survived after surgery. Another policeman managed to return fire at the terrorists, who then threw a grenade and ran away. The third member of the patrol, 23-year old policeman Fausto Dionisi, was killed. The Italian state honored Dionisi posthumously with the Award for Civil Valor. An elementary school in the city in which the policeman was killed and a street in Rome were given his name.

On 15 May 1978, in the Quarto Inferiore frazione of Bologna, Antonio Mazzotti, personnel director of the Menarini plant, a factory that had just come out of prolonged and "tough" dispute with the workers' union, was shot and injured by three armed individuals. Initially, the attack was attributed to the Red Brigades but eventually the signature name (Formazioni comuniste combattenti) left behind on flyers pointed to Linea. The episode marked the end of the media's characterization of Bologna as a city immune from terrorism.

On 11 October 1978, four assailants, three men and one woman, shot and killed University of Naples criminology professor Alfredo Paolella in the garage of his Naples home, an act for which Linea for the first time directly assumed the responsibility. In 2020, in a commemoration ceremony, the president of the Benevento province described Paolella as someone among "those who were dedicated to the implementation of a prison system in line with the fundamental principles of a democratic state". At the time of his assassination, Paolella, as reported at the time, was working, along with magistrate Girolamo Tartaglione, assassinated the previous day by the Red Brigades, on a project whose aim was "to improve the living conditions of the prisoners." The executioners were subsequently identified to have been Susanna Ronconi, Nicola Solimano, Sonia Benedetti, Bruno La Ronga, and Felice Maresca. On 1 December 1978, outside a Milanese bar, Linea members Maurizio Baldasseroni and Oscar Tagliaferri, after an "evening of heavy drinking," killed three people with whom they had been arguing inside the bar about the merits of armed struggle in Italy. The pair of killers were refused endorsement of their act by the Linea leadership and left the country to disappear in South America.

Deputy prosecutor Emilio Alessandrini had become known since 1972 for leading the state's case against terrorists of the extreme right, such as the perpetrators of the Piazza Fontana massacre, as well as the extreme left. During his investigative work, Alessandrini had claimed the discovery of various "anomalies" in the work of the Italian intelligence services. On 29 January 1979, while driving to his workplace, he was shot dead by Sergio Segio and Marco Donat Cattin, who fired at the prosecutor, while Michele Viscardi and Umberto Mazzola acted as protective cover; Bruno Russo Palombi was the getaway driver. Hours after the attack, a call was made to Milanese newspapers, claiming the assassination by the "fire unit Romano Tognini 'Valerio' of the communist organization Prima Linea." The callers, in justifying the act, stated the following:

Alessandrini was one of the central figures that the capitalist command uses to re-establish itself as an efficient military and judicial machine and as a controller of social and proletarian behavior, on which [the state] intervenes when the proletarian struggle becomes antagonistic and subversive to the state's authority.

Beginning from 1979, the organization initiated also a campaign of wounding targets with gun shots, in actions such as the wounding of prison guard Raffaela Napolitano on 5 February, the shooting of Stanislao Salemme, a retired employee of the Social Security authority, on 22 June, the October crippling of Piercarlo Andreoletti, Praxis managing director, in Turin, the November raid of a youth detention center during which guard Sulvatore Castaldo was shot in the knees, and many others.

On 13 March 1979, a group of two men and one woman stormed the offices of the Emilia-Romagna Journalists Association in Bologna, forced an employee and a reporter's widow who happened to be there in a room and set fire to the premises. The group then left the building without any further action. The two persons who had been locked up managed to call for help and were rescued by the fire brigade. In the apartment upstairs, an old woman who lived there and her daughter escaped through the roof from the fire that engulfed the building. Graziella Fava, care taker of the old lady, fell unconscious from the smoke and was later found dead in the stairwell. The attack was claimed by "The Wild Cats," a name used by Prima Linea in honor of their fallen comrades.

On 11 December 1979, a Linea unit of "certainly more than ten persons," raided a corporate management school in Turin. They kneecapped five instructors and ten students, and left, leaving behind a message honoring two organization members, Matteo Caggegi and Barbara Azzaroni, who had been killed in a firefight with the police in March. Most of the injured instructors were Fiat managers. Student Giuseppe Dall'Occhio, 28 years old, was asked by a terrorist if he aims to become a manager. When the student answered affirmatively, the terrorist shot him in the leg, telling him "It's a bad job." Another student exclaimed that he came from the south of Italy to study so he could find a job, to which one of the armed women responded, "Go and steal."

On 5 February 1980, a year that has been described as annus horribilis in Italy, Giulia Borelli, Michele Viscardi, and Diego Forastieri, commanded by Bruno La Ronga, assassinated in Meda, Lombardy, Paolo Paoletti, head of Industrie Chimiche Meda Società Azionaria S.A., owners of the plant that had caused the 1976 serious industrial accident in Seveso. On 7 February 1980, William Waccher, a 26-year old surveyor from Battipaglia who used to be part of Linea's support & logistics network, was executed in a Milan street by his former comrades for treason. Wachher, in July of the same year, had turned himself in after his cousin, Linea member Claudio, was arrested. During his interrogation, Waccher had revealed the involvement in the organization of his cousin Claudio and given the names of Marco Fagiano and Bruno Russo Palombi, "figures of the first rank." He'd also provided information about a certain "Alberto," without knowing that it was the nom de guerre of Marco Donat Cattin.

On 19 March 1980, magistrate and academic Guido Galli was assassinated by a group in which were Sergio Segio, Maurice Bignami, and Michele Viscardi, among others. He was shot in the back and then finished off with two bullets in the head. The reason proclaimed by the organization, in a phone call to Ansa, was that Galli had been the lead investigator on Linea starting from September 1978, after the arrest of Corrado Alunni and the discovery of a safe house's contents in via Negroli, in Milan. The other reason given for the "death sentence" was that the magistrate had "engaged in the effort to restructure the educational bureau of the Milan judiciary and make it efficient and suited to the needs of [the state]."

On 11 August 1980, Brigadiere Pietro Cuzzoli and Appuntato Ippolito Cortellessa of the Viterbo carabinieria, were killed in Ponte di Cetti, a few kilometers outside Rome. Their patrol had stopped a bus that was carrying among the other passengers six Linea members who had just robbed a bank in Viterbo and who engaged the officers in a firefight, during which terrorist Michele Viscardi was wounded and arrested. The two fallen officers were posthumously awarded the gold medal for Military Valor.

On 28 November 1980, two Linea members ambushed Giuseppe Filippo, chief of the Polizia di Stato, while he was returning home and shot him. Before leaving, they took his service pistol. The policeman died shortly after he was taken to the hospital.

Following the revelations of Sandalo to the investigators, several Linea militants were arrested, in October 1980, including Michele Viscardi, known as Miki dagli occhi di ghiaccio ("Miki with eyes of ice") who was captured in Sorrento, "immediately repented," and began to collaborate with the police. On the basis of Viscardi's testimony, the police, in their words, "decapitated" Linea, arresting Susanna Ronconi and Roberto Rosso, and raiding five "safe houses" in Florence, Taranto, and Naples inside which the group kept documents and weapons. The police subsequently became aware of internal appeals circulated at the time within the organization in which the first proposals to "abandon the armed struggle" were made.

On 18 September 1981, Francesco Rucci, Brigadiere of the Corpo degli agenti di custodia prison police, while driving to work was executed by a group that identified itself in the flyers they left behind as "Communist Nuclei," a name that had been used for various operations by Linea. The text stated that Rucci had been "executed" for his work "at the first wing of the San Vittore Prison," because, there, the executioners claimed, he was "torturing communist prisoners." The crime was notable for the plethora of shots fired on the face of the human target, in an apparent intent to disfigure the body. (Note: About the actual conditions in the San Vittore Prison, Linea member Paolo Margini, who had been held there, subsequently gave a personal, detailed account. See Tassinari (September 2021))

On 21 January 1982, at a carabinieri checkpoint on the Siena-Montalcino road, the carabinieri stopped for a "routine control" a bus on which seven terrorists were traveling, having just carried out a bank robbery on the outskirts of Siena. As two of them were deemed to act suspiciously and ordered out for a more detailed questioning, a third terrorist opened fire. In the ensuing firefight officers Giuseppe Savastano and Euro Tarsilli were killed while Maresciallo Augusto Barna was seriously injured. One of the terrorists, Lucio "Olmo" Di Giacomo, was killed. The other six, taking one woman from the bus as hostage, fled towards an uninhabited house in Civitella Paganico and then tried to reach Grosseto. On their way there, in Arlena di Castro, a group of carabinieri intercepted their car and opened fire. The terrorists again managed to escape, leaving behind the bank loot, the hostage, and some weapons. They were all subsequently captured, tried, and sentenced to prison terms. Among the group that took part in the checkpoint firefight were three fugitives from justice: Daniele Sacco-Lanzoni, Sonia Benedetti, and Susanna Ronconi.

In 1982, a group led by Segio, detonated a car bomb parked along the walls of the Rovigo prison, the explosion causing the death of Angelo Furlan, a 64-year old pensioner who happened to pass by, and allowing Ronconi to escape. She was recaptured a few months later and upon her return to prison she married Segio.

== Dissolution ==
Trial of Linea members in Turin, 1983. In the front row, leaning against the rails, from r. to l., Enrico Galmozzi speaking to a defense lawyer, and Susanna Ronconi. Behind them, Bruno La Ronga and Silveria Russo.

Beginning from the year 1980, which saw a peak of political violence at the same time as numerous urban guerillas repenting and collaborating with the state, there was intense debate inside Prima Linea as well as in other formations, about the merits of the armed struggle. Some Linea members left the organization to join the Red Brigades. In 1981, in a series of internal meetings held at Barzio, in the province of Como, it was decided to disband the organisation. Several members went on to form the Comunisti Organizzati per la Liberazione Proletaria or COLP ("Organized Communists for the Proletarian Liberation") whose aim was to free jailed terrorists and "political prisoners." It was under this title that the Rovigo operation was conducted.

== Post-militancy ==
Enrico Galmozzi was arrested on 13 May 1977. He was tried and found guilty for first-degree murder in the cases of Enrico Pedenovi and Giuseppe Ciotta. He served a total of 12 years prison time. In 2019, he published a book, Sons of the workshop, whose aim, he stated, was not to denounce the armed struggle of the time but to "contextualize" it. Asked by a victim's relative, during a presentation of the book, whether he repents for the killings, Galmozzi responded: "Policemen and carabinieri have killed hundreds of workers and peasants. Only I have to repent?"

On 13 September 1978, Corrado Alunni was captured when the police raided the apartment in via Negroli, in Milan, where he was hiding. Numerous firearms, explosives, and documents were found in the house. On 18 March 1987, he was sentenced to "more than fifty years" in prison. After publicly "dissociating" himself from the armed struggle, he was granted, in 1989, a conditional release.

Sergio D'Elia was arrested in Florence on 17 May 1979. He was tried and, in 1983, sentenced to 30 years imprisonment. In 1986, he denounced the armed struggle as well as all of Marxist ideology and moved on to libertarian positions, supporting human rights and non violence. While in prison, he joined the Radical Party. In 1993, he founded, with his then wife Mariateresa Di Lascia, the organization Nessuno tocchi Caino ("Hands off Cain"), which fights against capital punishment. After spending a total of almost 12 years in prison, and as a result of the state's clemency measures, he was set free. In 2006, he was elected to the Italian parliament, an election that was protested by the Turin's police leadership and the Northern League party.

Following the revelations of pentiti, Marco Donat-Cattin was identified by the police but managed to escape to France, in an episode that caused furore in both Italy and France. He was extradited back to his home country in 1981, repented and began collaborating with the authorities. Due to his denunciation of the armed struggle, he was convicted only to house arrest and then set completely free in 1987. He was killed by a car near Verona in June 1988 as he was trying to rescue a woman entrapped in an accident wreck.

On 29 April 1980, Roberto Sandalo, also known as "Roby the madman" and "Commander Franco", was arrested and immediately began to collaborate with the authorities. He admitted, among other crimes, his participation in the assassinations of Carlo Ghiglieno, Carmine Civitate, and Bartolomeo Mana. His testimony enabled the police to locate and arrest a reported number of 165 members of Linea, effectively neutralizing the organization. He was tried and sentenced to 11 years and 7 months imprisonment. His sentence, on account of his collaboration, was reduced and he was released from prison after serving approximately two and a half years, on 19 November 19, 1982. He was provided with a new identity as Roberto Severini, and in the mid-1980s he moved to Kenya. In the late 1990s, Sandalo, under his true identity, returned to Italy and joined the ranks of the Lega Nord ("Northern League") party, but, when his past became known, in 1999, he was expelled from it. On 10 April 2008, he was arrested in Milan for participating in attacks on mosques and Islamic cultural centers in the city, and of creating the "terrorist organization" called "Christian Fighting Front." He had started serving a 9-year sentence in the Parma prison when he died on 9 January 2014 from natural causes.

After his arrest in 1980, Michele Viscardi denounced the armed struggle and began collaborating with the authorities. He was tried and, though having confessed to the assassination of two carabinieri, was sentenced, in October 1981, to 13 years in prison, on account of his collaboration. He became known as a super-pentito. On the basis of information provided by Viscardi and others, Bruno La Ronga was arrested in Milan in May 1980. After being sentenced to life imprisonment, La Ronga "distanced" himself from the armed struggle and began collaborating with state authorities, marrying Linea militant Silveria Russo while they were both in prison. They obtained a conditional release in the late 1980s, on the basis of legislative acts of clemency.

In February 1981, Maurice Bignami was captured in Turin by the police during a Linea bank robbery, after he chose not to detonate the grenades he was carrying. After Bignani was approached in prison by Adolfo Bachelet, brother of Brigate victim Vittorio, and by monsignor Luigi Di Liegro, founder of Caritas di Roma, he became a "devout" Christian, renounced terrorism, and began working in a home for the elderly. In 2020, he published a book about his part in Linea, titled Goodbye, revolution.

In 1983, Sergio Segio, whose nom de guerre was "Commandante Sirio," was arrested in Milan, tried for murder and various other crimes, and sentenced to life imprisonment. His sentence was reduced on appeal to 30 years. In 1992, he was granted a conditional release from prison. He began to work for the Abele Group of Luigi Ciotti, a CGIL group engaged in the fight against drug addiction and on issues of prison inmates and conditions. Twenty-two years after his sentencing, Segio was completely free. In prison, Segio and Susanna Ronconi were married, though they later divorced. Ronconi was sentenced to 22 years in prison, and was released at approximately the same time as Segio. She remained unrepentant about her actions in Linea. In a 2006 interview to Il Giornale, Ronconi stated that she finds "today's society more unfair than that of the 1970s." In historian Andrea Tanturli's 2018 book Prima linea – The other armed struggle, Ronconi is quoted as stating that Linea was a sort of "delegation, a substitute for what should have been the strength of a social movement," a statement which the book's author found to be "an admission of defeat."

In 1997, sixty-three former terrorists living, conditionally or not, outside prison, who used to belong to the Brigate Rosse, Prima Linea, and other organizations, signed and published an open letter to the Italian state asking for clemency and pardons for those remaining in incarceration, pointing out that those still inside had served "an average of 15 years," which, they wrote, is "near the maximum of prison time in other European countries." Among the signatories were Lauro Azzolini, Corrado Alunni, Giulia Borelli, Susanna Ronconi, Roberto Rosso, and Sergio Segio who was asked by a journalist about how their victims should feel about this petition. Segio responded that this is a question that "is always rightly destined to re-emerge," "an unavoidable problem." He stated that "personal pain cannot in any manner find satisfaction or compensation," arguing that "at the same time, pain cannot be used within a political reasoning," and that "the function of the State and the legislature [should have] its own autonomy." The petition to end the "never-ending story" was also signed by Carole Beebe, former member of the Italian Parliament with the Sinistra indipendente party and widow of economist and academic Ezio Tarantelli who had been assassinated in 1985 by the Red Brigades. (Note: Following her husband's murder, Beebe engaged in anti-terrorism and anti-violence work, meeting with terrorists while they were in prison and engaging them in a dialogue about political violence and the impact such violence has had in Italy. Beebe, in 1988, founded Differenza Donna, an organization dedicated to combating violence against women. See Wellesley (2005).)

== In popular culture ==
In 2009, the film La prima linea, directed by Renato De Maria, was released, starring Riccardo Scamarcio and Giovanna Mezzogiorno. The plot was about Sergio Segio's participation in the group's activities, and the relationship between him and Susanna Ronconi, as well as her escape from prison. (Note: In a 2009 interview for mymovies, the director stated: "One of the reasons that prompted me to shoot this film is undoubtedly linked to the young age of Susanna and Sergio. When, in January 1982, Sergio decided to free Susanna from the Rovigo prison, where she was being held together with three other companions, she was only twenty-five years old. This means that when she joined the ranks of Lotta Continua she was just eighteen. And she committed her terrorist acts between the ages of twenty-one and twenty-five. Before asking myself the problem of Piety, I ask why all this happened; I want to understand how young people could choose the armed struggle, go underground and move away from life and reality, living in a paranoid dimension of confrontation between them and the state." See Archivio Film Rosebud (2009))

== See also ==
- Terrorism in Italy
