= United States and state-sponsored terrorism =

U.S. support given to terrorist and paramilitary organizations

The United States has provided support to terrorist organizations and has funded paramilitary organizations around the world. It has also provided assistance to authoritarian regimes that have used state terrorism as a tool of repression.

American support for terrorists has been prominent in Latin America and the Middle East. For example, from 1981 to 1991, the United States provided weapons, training, and extensive financial and logistical support to the Contra rebels in Nicaragua, who used terror tactics in their fight against the socialist Nicaraguan government. At various points the United States also provided training, arms, and funds to terrorists among Cuban exiles, such as Orlando Bosch and Luis Posada Carriles.

Various reasons have been given to justify this support, including the "threat of communism" necessitating the destabilization of political movements that might have aligned with the Soviet Union during the Cold War, including popular democratic and socialist movements. Such support has also been justified as part of the "war on terror" in the wake of 9/11. Some scholars have argued this support aims to ensure a conducive environment for American corporate interests abroad, often and especially in response to threats against these interests from democratic governments. Other counter-insurgency scholars have discredited such arguments.

== Cuba ==
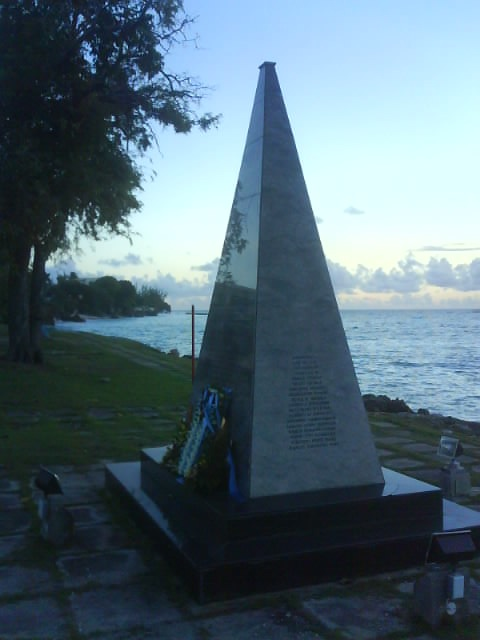
A memorial to Cubana Flight 455

Starting in 1959, under the Eisenhower administration, the U.S. government had the Central Intelligence Agency recruit operatives in Cuba to carry out terrorism and sabotage, kill civilians, and cause economic damage.

In 1961 the U.S. government, through the military and the CIA, engaged in a far more extensive campaign of state-sponsored terrorism against civilian and military targets in Cuba. The terrorist attacks killed significant numbers of civilians. The U.S. armed, trained, funded and directed the terrorists, most of whom were Cuban expatriates. Andrew Bacevich, Professor of International Relations and History at Boston University, wrote of the campaign:

In its determination to destroy the Cuban Revolution, the Kennedy administration heedlessly embarked upon what was, in effect, a program of state-sponsored terrorism... the actions of the United States toward Cuba during the early 1960s bear comparison with Iranian and Syrian support for proxies engaging in terrorist activities against Israel

Among the most prominent of these terrorists were Orlando Bosch and Luis Posada Carriles, who were implicated in the 1976 bombing of a Cuban plane. Bosch was also held to be responsible for 30 other terrorist acts, while Carriles was a former CIA agent convicted of numerous terrorist acts committed while he was linked to the agency. They and other Cuban exiles involved in terrorist acts, including Jose Dionisio Suarez and Virgilio Paz Romero, two exiles who murdered the Chilean diplomat Orlando Letelier in Washington in 1976, were released by the administration of George W. Bush.

=== Orlando Bosch ===
Bosch was a contemporary of Fidel Castro at the University of Havana, where he was involved with the student cells that eventually became a part of the Cuban revolution. However, Bosch became disillusioned with Castro's regime, and participated in a failed rebellion in 1960. He became the leader of the Insurrectional Movement of Revolutionary Recovery (MIRR), and also joined efforts to assassinate Castro along with Luis Posada Carriles. The CIA later confirmed that they had received support from Bosch in 1962, but ceased contact with him after he requested financial support to mount airstrikes against Cuba in 1963. He was the head of Coordination of United Revolutionary Organizations, which the FBI has described as "an anti-Castro terrorist umbrella organization". Former U.S. Attorney General Dick Thornburgh called Bosch an "unrepentant terrorist".

In 1968, he was convicted of firing a bazooka at a Polish cargo ship bound for Havana that had been docked in Miami. He was sentenced to 10 years in prison and released on parole in 1974. He immediately broke parole and traveled around Latin America. He was eventually arrested in Venezuela for planning to bomb the Cuban embassy there. The Venezuelan government offered to extradite him to the United States, but the offer was declined. He was released quickly and moved to Chile, and according to the US government, spent two years attempting postal bombings of Cuban embassies in four countries.

Bosch eventually ended up in the Dominican Republic, where he joined the effort to consolidate Cuban exile militants into the Coordination of United Revolutionary Organizations (CORU). The CORU's operations included the failed assassination of the Cuban ambassador to Argentina, and the bombing of the Mexican Embassy in Guatemala City. Along with Posada, he worked with the DINA agent Michael Townley to plan the assassination of Letelier, which was carried out in September 1976. Two other Cuban exiles involved in the assassination, Jose Dionisio Suarez and Virgilio Paz Romero, were later released by the administration of George H.W. Bush. Bosch was also implicated in the 1976 bombing of a Cuban plane flying to Havana from Venezuela in which all 73 civilians on board were killed, although Posada and he were acquitted after a lengthy trial. Documents released subsequently showed that the CIA had a source with advance knowledge of the bombing. The U.S. Justice Department recorded that Bosch was also responsible for 30 other attacks. He returned to Miami, where he was arrested for violating parole. The Justice department recommended that he be deported. However, Bush overturned this recommendation, and had him released from custody with the stipulation that he "renounce" violence.

=== Luis Posada Carriles ===
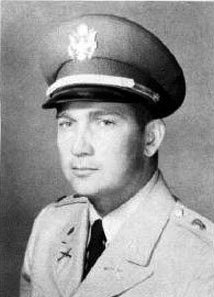
Luis Posada Carriles at Fort Benning, Georgia, 1962

Luis Posada Carriles, a former CIA agent who has been designated by scholars and journalists as a terrorist, (Note: Attributed to multiple references:) also came into contact with Castro during his student days, but fled Cuba after the 1959 revolution, and helped organize the failed Bay of Pigs invasion. Following the invasion, Carriles was trained for a time at the Fort Benning station of the U.S. Army. He then relocated to Venezuela and became the first head of the National Directorate of Intelligence and Prevention Services (DISIP), Venezuela's intelligence agency, and came into contact with Orlando Bosch. Along with Bosch and others, he founded the Coordination of United Revolutionary Organizations, which has been described as an umbrella of anti-Castro terrorist groups.

In 1976, Cubana Flight 455 was blown up in mid-air, killing all 73 people on board. Carriles was arrested for masterminding the operation, and later acquitted. He and several CIA-linked anti-Castro Cuban exiles and members of the Venezuelan intelligence agency DISIP were implicated by the evidence. Political complications quickly arose when Cuba accused the US government of being an accomplice to the attack. CIA documents released in 2005 indicate that the agency "had concrete advance intelligence, as early as June 1976, on plans by Cuban exile terrorist groups to bomb a Cubana airliner." Carriles denies involvement but provides many details of the incident in his book Los caminos del guerrero (The Warrior's Paths).

After a series of arrests and escapes, Carriles returned to the CIA fold in 1985 by joining their support operations to the Contra terrorists in Nicaragua, which were being run by Oliver North. His job included air dropping military supplies, for which he was paid a significant salary. He later admitted to playing a part in the Iran-Contra affair. In 1997, a series of terrorist bombings occurred in Cuba, and Carriles was implicated. The bombings were said to be targeted at the growing tourism there. Carriles admitted that the lone conviction in the case had been of a mercenary under his command, and also made a confession (later retracted) that he had planned the incident. Human Rights Watch stated that although Carriles might no longer receive active assistance, he benefited from the tolerant attitude of the U.S. government. In 2000, Carriles was arrested and convicted in Panama of attempting to assassinate Fidel Castro.

In 2005, Carriles was held by U.S. authorities in Texas on a charge of illegal presence on national territory, but the charges were dismissed on May 8, 2007. On September 28, 2005, a U.S. immigration judge ruled that Carriles could not be deported, finding that he faced the threat of torture in Venezuela. Likewise, the US government has refused to send Carriles to Cuba, saying he might face torture. His release on bail on April 19, 2007, elicited angry reactions from the Cuban and Venezuelan governments. The U.S. Justice Department had urged the court to keep him in jail because he was "an admitted mastermind of terrorist plots and attacks", a flight risk and a danger to the community. On September 9, 2008, the United States Court of Appeals for the Fifth Circuit reversed the District Court's order dismissing the indictment and remanded the case to the District Court. On April 8, 2009, the United States Attorney filed a superseding indictment in the case. Carriles' trial ended on April 8, 2011, with a jury acquitting him on all charges. Peter Kornbluh described him as "one of the most dangerous terrorists in recent history" and the "godfather of Cuban exile violence."

== Italy ==
The Years of Lead was a period of socio-political turmoil in Italy that lasted from the late 1960s into the early 1980s. This period was marked by a wave of terrorism carried out by both right-wing and left-wing paramilitary groups. It was concluded that the former were supported by the United States as a strategy of tension.

General Gianadelio Maletti, commander of the counter-intelligence section of the Italian military intelligence service from 1971 to 1975, stated that his men in the region of Venice discovered a right-wing terrorist cell that had been supplied with military explosives from Germany, and alleged that US intelligence services instigated and abetted right-wing terrorism in Italy during the 1970s.

According to the investigation of Italian judge Guido Salvini, the neo-fascist organizations involved in the strategy of tension, "La Fenice, Avanguardia nazionale, Ordine nuovo" were the "troops" of "clandestine armed forces", directed by components of the "state apparatus related to the CIA."

Any relationship of the CIA to the terrorist attacks perpetrated in Italy during the Years of Lead is the subject of debate. Switzerland and Belgium have had parliamentary inquiries into the matter.

=== Piazza Fontana bombing ===
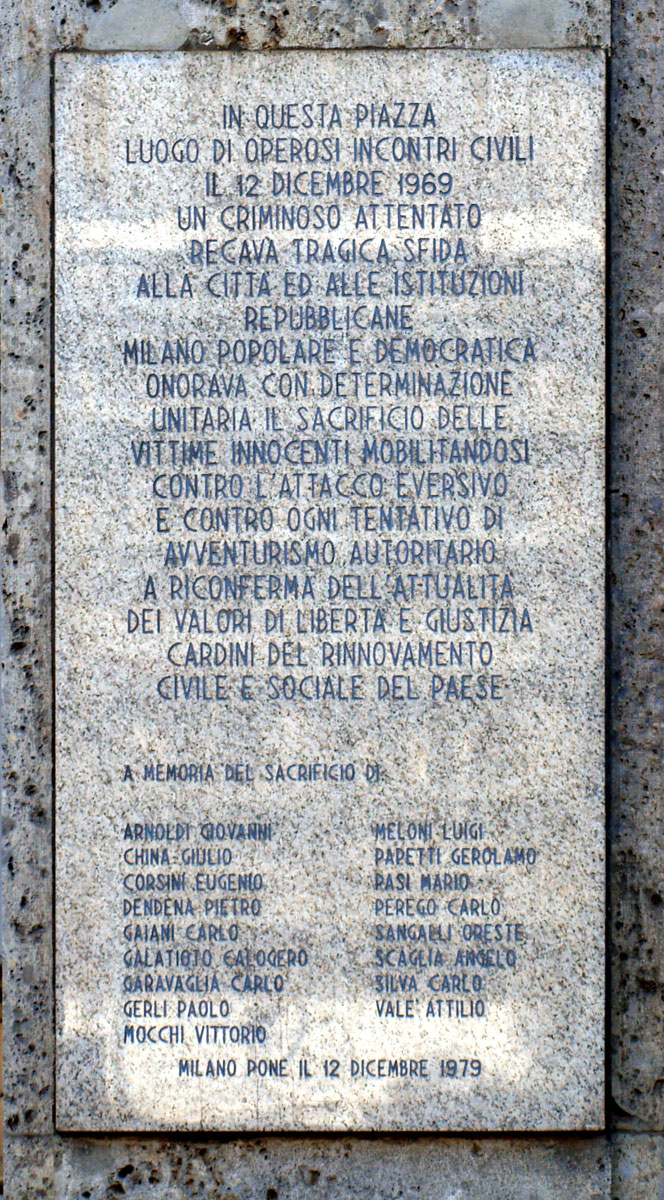
Plaque in memory of the 17 victims of the terrorist bombing in Piazza Fontana

The Piazza Fontana Bombing was a terrorist attack that occurred on December 12, 1969, at 16:37, when a bomb exploded at the headquarters of Banca Nazionale dell'Agricoltura (National Agrarian Bank) in Piazza Fontana in Milan, killing 17 people and wounding 88. The same afternoon, three more bombs were detonated in Rome and Milan, and another was found undetonated.

In 1998, Milan judge Guido Salvini indicted U.S. Navy officer David Carrett on charges of political and military espionage for his alleged participation in the Piazza Fontana bombing et al. Salvini also opened up a case against Sergio Minetto, an Italian official of the U.S.-NATO intelligence network, and "collaboratore di giustizia" Carlo Digilio (Uncle Otto), who served as the CIA coordinator in Northeastern Italy in the sixties and seventies. The newspaper la Repubblica reported that Carlo Rocchi, CIA's man in Milan, was discovered in 1995 searching for information concerning Operation Gladio.

A 2000 parliamentary report published by the center-left Olive Tree coalition claimed that "U.S. intelligence agents were informed in advance about several right-wing terrorist bombings, including the December 1969 Piazza Fontana bombing in Milan and the Piazza della Loggia bombing in Brescia five years later, but did nothing to alert the Italian authorities or to prevent the attacks from taking place." It also alleged that Pino Rauti (current leader of the MSI Fiamma-Tricolore party), a journalist and founder of the far-right Ordine Nuovo (New Order) subversive organization, received regular funding from a press officer at the U.S. embassy in Rome. "So even before the 'stabilising' plans that Atlantic circles had prepared for Italy became operational through the bombings, one of the leading members of the subversive right was literally in the pay of the American embassy in Rome", the report says.

Paolo Emilio Taviani, the Christian Democrat co-founder of Gladio (NATO's stay-behind anti-Communist organization in Italy), told investigators that the SID military intelligence service was about to send a senior officer from Rome to Milan to prevent the bombing, but decided to send a different officer from Padua in order to put the blame on left-wing anarchists. Taviani also alleged in an August 2000 interview to Il Secolo XIX newspaper: "It seems to me certain, however, that agents of the CIA were among those who supplied the materials and who muddied the waters of the investigation."

Guido Salvini said, "The role of the Americans was ambiguous, halfway between knowing and not preventing and actually inducing people to commit atrocities."

According to Vincenzo Vinciguerra, the terrorist attack was supposed to push then Interior Minister Mariano Rumor to declare a state of emergency.

== Nicaragua ==
From 1979 to 1990, the United States provided financial, logistical and military support to the Contra rebels in Nicaragua, who used terrorist tactics in their war against the Nicaraguan government and carried out more than 1300 terrorist attacks. This support persisted despite widespread knowledge of the human rights violations committed by the Contras.

=== Background ===
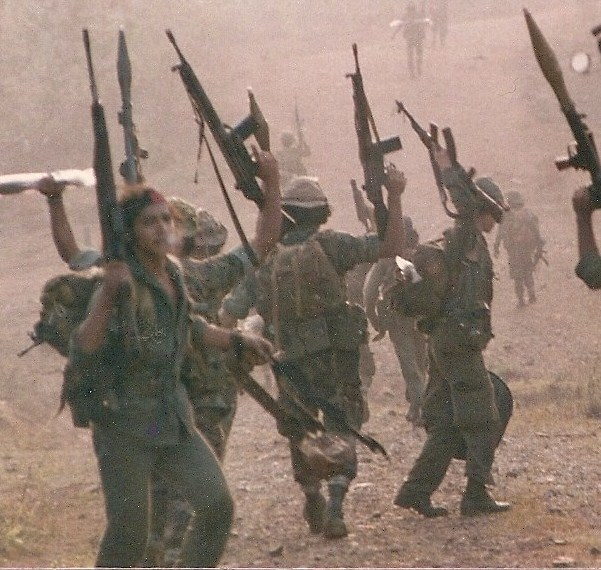
The U.S.-supported Nicaraguan Contras

In 1979, the Sandinista National Liberation Front (FSLN) overthrew the dictatorial regime of Anastasio Somoza Debayle, and established a revolutionary government in Nicaragua. The Somoza dynasty had been receiving military and financial assistance from the United States since 1936. Following their seizure of power, the Sandinistas ruled the country first as part of a Junta of National Reconstruction, and later as a democratic government following free and fair elections in 1984.

The Sandinistas did not attempt to create a communist society or communist economic system; instead, their policy advocated a social democracy and a mixed economy. The government sought the aid of Western Europe, who were opposed to the U.S. embargo against Nicaragua, to escape dependency on the Soviet Union. However, the U.S. administration viewed the leftist Sandinista government as undemocratic and totalitarian under the ties of the Soviet-Cuban model and tried to paint the Contras as freedom fighters.

The Sandinista government headed by Daniel Ortega won decisively in the 1984 Nicaraguan elections. The U.S. government explicitly planned to back the Contras, various rebel groups collectively that were formed in response to the rise of the Sandinistas, as a means to damage the Nicaraguan economy and force the Sandinista government to divert its scarce resources toward the army and away from social and economic programs.

=== Covert operations ===
The United States began to support Contra activities against the Sandinista government by December 1981, with the CIA at the forefront of operations. The CIA provided the Contras with planning and operational direction and assistance, weapons, food, and training, in what was described as the "most ambitious" covert operation in more than a decade.

One of the purposes the CIA hoped to achieve by these operations was an aggressive and violent response from the Sandinista government which in turn could be used as a pretext for further military actions.

The Contra campaign against the government included frequent and widespread acts of terror. The economic and social reforms enacted by the government enjoyed some popularity; as a result, the Contras attempted to disrupt these programs. This campaign included the destruction of health centers and hospitals that the Sandinista government had established, in order to diminish their influence upon the populace. Schools were also destroyed, as the literacy campaign conducted by the government was an important part of its policy. The Contras also committed widespread kidnappings, murder, and rape. The kidnappings and murder were a product of the "low-intensity warfare" that the Reagan Doctrine prescribed as a way to disrupt social structures and gain control over the population. Also known as "unconventional warfare", advocated for and defined by the World Anti-Communist League's (WACL) retired U.S. Army Major General John Singlaub as, "low intensity actions, such as sabotage, terrorism, assassination and guerrilla warfare". In some cases, more indiscriminate killing and destruction also took place. The Contras also carried out a campaign of economic sabotage, and disrupted shipping by planting underwater mines in Nicaragua's Port of Corinto. The Reagan administration supported this by imposing a full trade embargo.

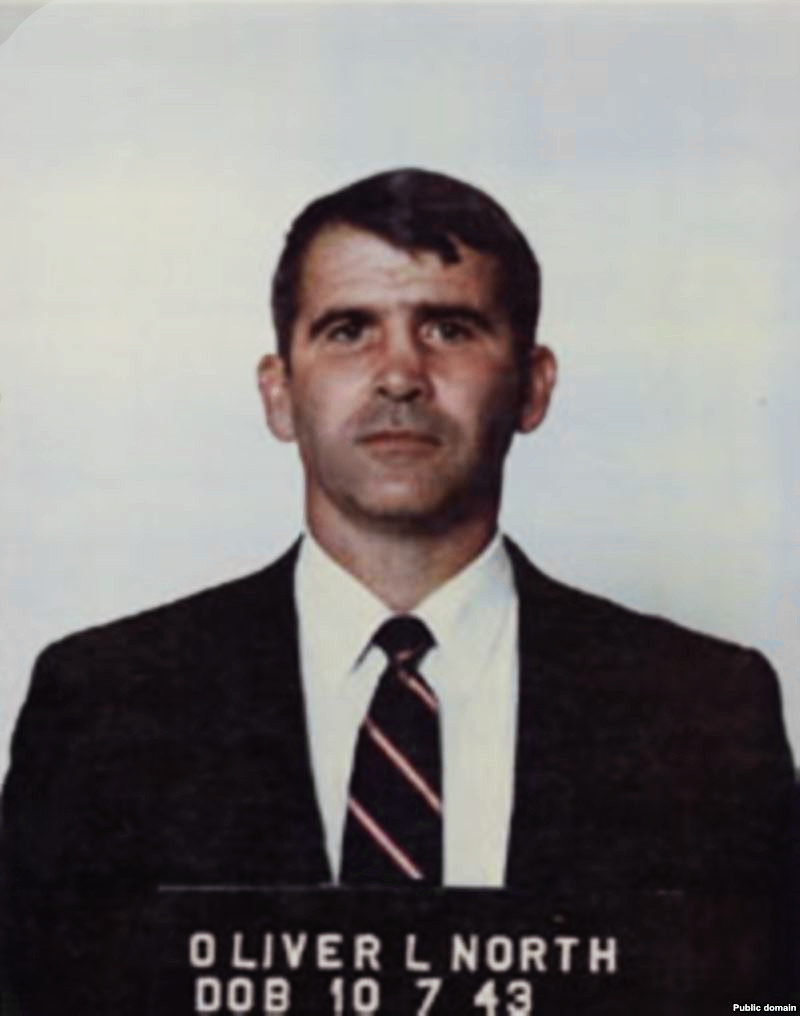
A mug shot of Oliver North, who conducted covert operations in support of the Contras

In fiscal year 1984, the U.S. Congress approved $24 million in aid to the contras. However, the Reagan administration lost a lot of support for its Contra policy after CIA involvement in the mining of Nicaraguan ports became public knowledge, and a report of the Bureau of Intelligence and Research commissioned by the State Department found that Reagan had exaggerated claims about Soviet interference in Nicaragua. Congress cut off all funds for the contras in 1985 with the third Boland Amendment.

As a result, the Reagan administration sought to provide funds from other sources. Between 1984 and 1986, $34 million was routed through third countries and $2.7 million through private sources. These funds were run through the National Security Council, by Lt. Col. Oliver North, who created an organization called "The Enterprise" which served as the secret arm of the NSC staff and had its own airplanes, pilots, airfield, ship, and operatives. It also received assistance from other government agencies, especially from CIA personnel in Central America. These efforts culminated in the Iran-Contra Affair of 1986–1987, which facilitated funding for the Contras using the proceeds of arms sales to Iran. Money was also raised for the Contras through drug trafficking, which the United States was aware of. U.S. Senator John Kerry's 1988 Committee on Foreign Relations report on Contra drug links concluded that "senior U.S. policy makers were not immune to the idea that drug money was a perfect solution to the Contras' funding problems".

=== Propaganda ===
Throughout the Nicaraguan Civil War, the Reagan government conducted a campaign to shift public opinion toward support for the Contras and to change the vote in Congress in favor of that support. For this purpose, the National Security Council authorized the production and distribution of publications that looked favorably at the Contras, also known as "white propaganda," written by paid consultants who did not disclose their connection to the administration. It also arranged for speeches and press conferences conveying the same message. The U.S. government continually discussed the Contras in highly favorable terms; Reagan called them the "moral equivalent of the founding fathers." Another common theme the administration played on was the idea of returning Nicaragua to democracy, which analysts characterized as "curious," because Nicaragua had been a U.S.-supported dictatorship prior to the Sandinista revolution, and had never had a democratic government before the Sandinistas. There were also continued efforts to label the Sandinistas as undemocratic, although the 1984 Nicaraguan elections were generally declared fair by historians.

Commentators stated that this was all a part of an attempt to return Nicaragua to the state of its Central American neighbors; that is, where traditional social structures remained and American imperialist ideas were not threatened. The investigation into the Iran-Contra affair led to the operation being called a massive exercise in psychological warfare.

The CIA wrote a manual for the Contras, entitled Psychological Operations in Guerrilla Warfare (Operaciones sicológicas en guerra de guerrillas), which focused mainly on how "Armed Propaganda Teams" could build political support in Nicaragua for the Contra cause through deceit, intimidation, and violence. The manual discussed assassinations. The CIA claimed that the purpose of the manual was to "moderate" the extreme violence already being used by the Contras.

Leslie Cockburn writes that the CIA, and therefore indirectly the U.S. government and President Reagan, encouraged Contra terrorism by issuing the manual to the contras, violating Reagan's own Presidential Directive. Cockburn wrote that "[t]he manual, Psychological Operations in Guerrilla Warfare, clearly advocated a strategy of terror as the means to victory over the hearts and minds of Nicaraguans. Chapter headings such as 'Selective Use of Violence for propagandistic Effects' and 'Implicit and Explicit Terror' made that fact clear enough. ... The little booklet thus violated President Reagan's own Presidential Directive 12333, signed in December 1981, which prohibited any U.S. government employee—including the CIA—from having anything to do with assassinations."

=== International Court of Justice ruling ===
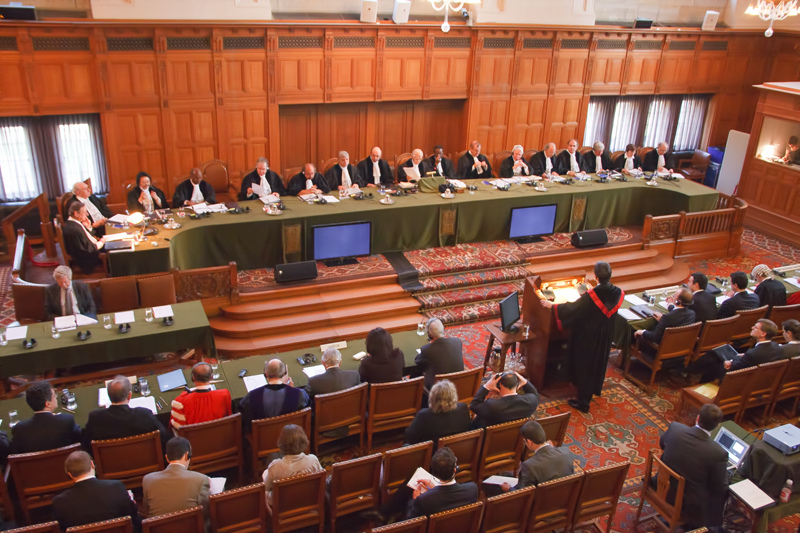
The International Court of Justice in session

In 1984, the Nicaraguan government filed a suit in the International Court of Justice (ICJ) against the United States. Nicaragua stated that the Contras were completely created and managed by the U.S. Although this claim was rejected, the court found overwhelming and undeniable evidence of a very close relationship between the Contras and the United States. The U.S. was found to have had a very large role in providing financial support, training, weapons, and other logistical support to the Contras over a lengthy period of time, and that this support was essential to the Contras.

In the same year, the ICJ ordered the United States to stop mining Nicaraguan harbors and respect Nicaraguan sovereignty. A few months later, the court ruled that it did have jurisdiction in the case, contrary to what the U.S. had argued. The ICJ found that the U.S. had encouraged violations of international humanitarian law by assisting paramilitary actions in Nicaragua. The court also criticized the production of a manual on psychological warfare by the U.S. and its dissemination of the Contras. The manual, amongst other things, provided advice on rationalizing the killing of civilians, and on targeted murder. The manual also included an explicit description of the use of "implicit terror."

Having initially argued that the ICJ lacked jurisdiction in the case, the United States withdrew from the proceedings in 1985. The court eventually ruled in favor of Nicaragua, and judged that the United States was required to pay reparations for its violation of International law. The U.S. used its veto on the United Nations Security Council to block the enforcement of the ICJ judgement, and thereby prevented Nicaragua from obtaining any compensation.

== Kosovo ==
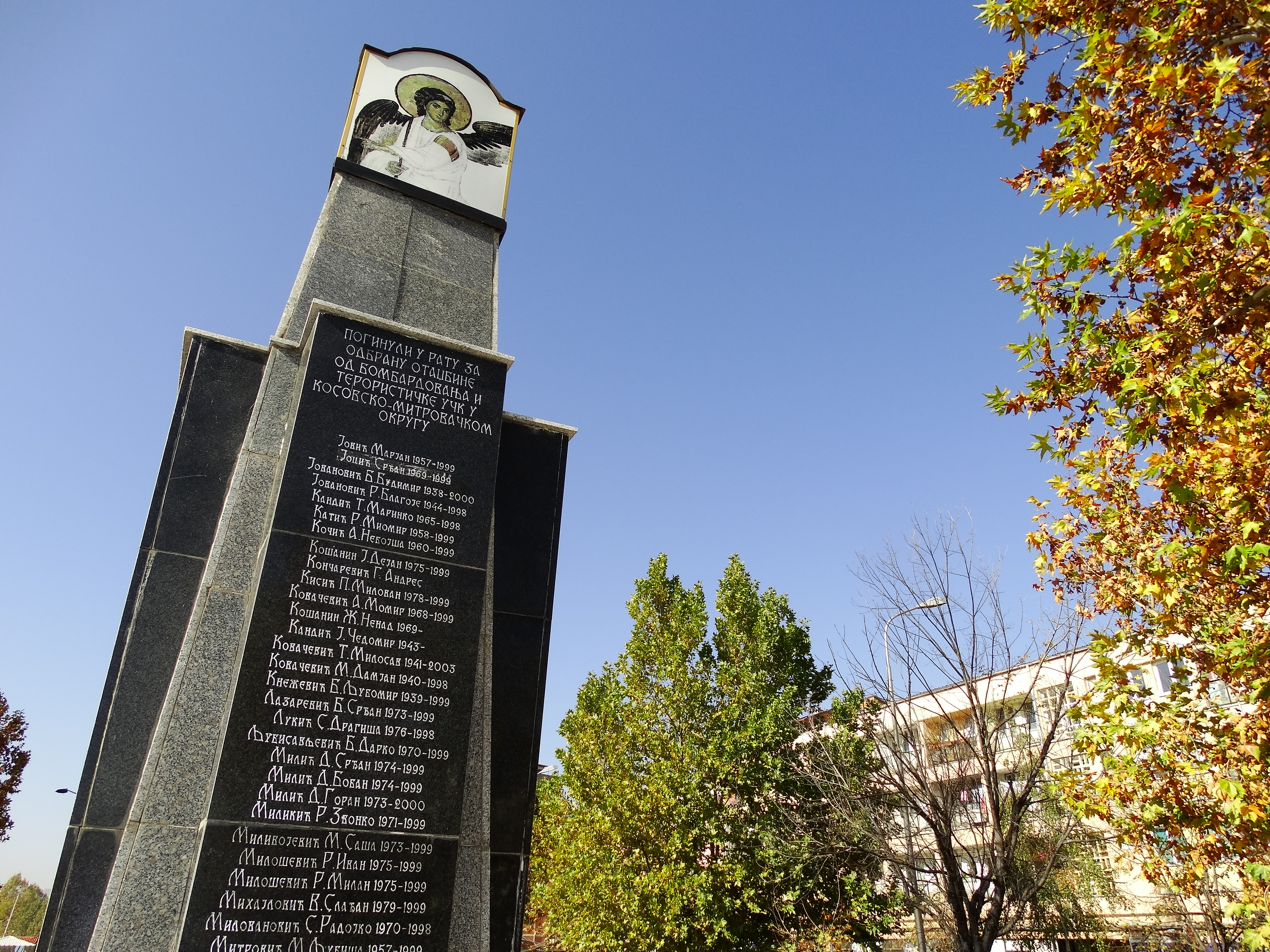
Monument to Serbs killed by Kosovo Liberation Army in Mitrovica

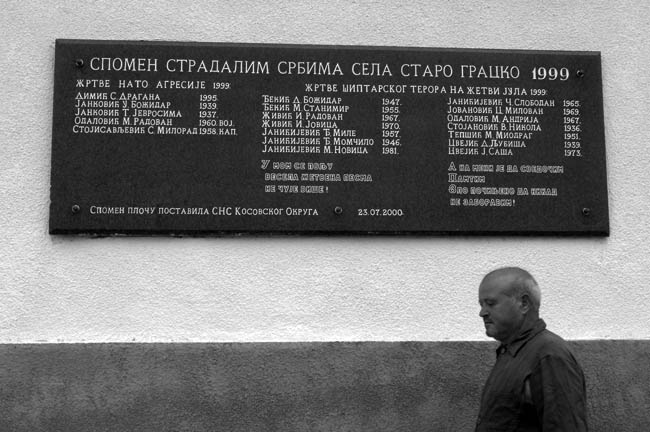
Staro Gracko massacre memorial

The FR Yugoslav authorities regarded the ethnic Albanian Kosovo Liberation Army (KLA) as a terrorist group, although many European governments did not. In February 1998, U.S. President Bill Clinton's special envoy to the Balkans, Robert Gelbard, condemned both the actions of the Yugoslav government and of the KLA, and described the KLA as "without any questions, a terrorist group". UN resolution 1160 took a similar stance. At first, NATO had stressed that KLA was "the main initiator of the violence" and that it had "launched what appears to be a deliberate campaign of provocation".

The United States (and NATO) directly supported the KLA. The CIA funded, trained and supplied the KLA. As disclosed to The Sunday Times by CIA sources, "American intelligence agents have admitted they helped to train the Kosovo Liberation Army before NATO's bombing of Yugoslavia". In 1999, a retired colonel said that KLA forces had been trained in Albania by former US military working for MPRI.

Former Canadian ambassador James Byron Bissett wrote in 2001 that media reports indicated that "as early as 1998, the Central Intelligence Agency assisted by the British Special Armed Services were arming and training Kosovo Liberation Army members in Albania to foment armed rebellion in Kosovo. ... The hope was that with Kosovo in flames NATO could intervene". According to Tim Judah, KLA representatives had already met with American, British, and Swiss intelligence agencies in 1996, and possibly "several years earlier".

After the war, the KLA was transformed into the Kosovo Protection Corps, which worked alongside NATO forces patrolling the province. In the following years, however, an ethnic Albanian insurgency emerged in southern Serbia (1999–2001) and in Macedonia (2001). The EU condemned what it described as the "extremism" and use of "illegal terrorist actions" by the group active in southern Serbia. Since the war, many of the KLA leaders have been active in the political leadership of the Republic of Kosovo.

== Syria ==
The United States has provided extensive lethal and non-lethal aid to many Syrian militant groups fighting against the Syrian government, an ally of Russia, during the Syrian Civil War. The Syrian government has directly accused the United States of sponsoring terrorism in Syria. The United States government was also criticized by Iran for its silence following the beheading of a child by the Islamist group Nour al-Din al-Zenki, a group that is a recipient of US military aid and is accused of many war crimes by Amnesty International.

Turkish president Recep Tayyip Erdoğan has also accused the United States of supporting ISIS in Syria, claiming Turkey has evidence of U.S. support for ISIS through pictures, photos, and videos.

An investigation by journalists Phil Sands and Suha Maayeh revealed that rebels supplied with weapons from the Military Operations Command in Amman sold a portion of them to local arms dealers, often to raise cash to pay additional fighters. Some MOC-supplied weapons were sold to Bedouin traders referred to locally as "The Birds" in Lajat, a volcanic plateau northeast of Daraa, Syria. According to rebel forces, the Bedouins would then trade the weapons to ISIL, who would place orders using the encrypted WhatsApp messaging service. Two rebel commanders and a United Kingdom weapons monitoring organization maintain that MOC–supplied weapons have made their way to ISIL forces.

Another study conducted by Conflict Armament Research, on behalf of the European Union and Deutsche Gesellschaft für Internationale Zusammenarbeit, found that external support for anti-Assad Syrian rebels "significantly augmented the quantity and quality of weapons available to [ISIL] forces", including, in the most rapid case of diversion they documented, "anti-tank weapons purchased by the United States that ended up in possession of the Islamic State within two months of leaving the factory."

Online, a photograph taken in Syria in 2013 was miscaptioned in order to claim that Senator John McCain posed with ISIS leader Abu Bakr al-Baghdadi. The photograph, however, actually depicted the commander of another Syrian rebel group allied with the Free Syrian Army, not al-Baghdadi.

On 11 August 2016, presidential nominee Donald Trump accused president Barack Obama, and Hillary Clinton of being the "founders of ISIS", although he later clarified that he was being "sarcastic". The White House did not comment on Trump's accusation. On 13 June 2024, Robert F. Kennedy Jr., the 2024 independent presidential candidate of the US presidential election, said "We created ISIS" during his foreign policy program speech.

== See also ==
=== United States ===
- 1985 Beirut car bombing
- Allegations of United States support for the Khmer Rouge
- Jundallah (Iran) § United States and Iran
- Operation Condor
- Operation Cyclone
- Operation Northwoods
- Saudi Arabia–United States relations § Allegations of funding terrorism
- State Sponsors of Terrorism (U.S. list)
- United States and state terrorism
- United States involvement in regime change
- United States war crimes

=== Other countries ===
- Hindu terrorism
- Hindutva
  - Violence against Christians in India
  - Violence against Muslims in independent India
- Iran and state-sponsored terrorism
- Israel and state-sponsored terrorism
- Pakistan and state-sponsored terrorism
- Qatar and state-sponsored terrorism
- Terrorism and the Soviet Union

== Works cited ==
- LaFeber, Walter (1993). Inevitable Revolutions: The United States in Central America. W. W. Norton & Company. ISBN 9780393309645.
- Latin American Studies Association (1984). The Electoral Process in Nicaragua: Domestic and International Influences. Latin American Studies Association.
- Grandin, Greg (2006). Empire's Workshop: Latin America, the United States, and the Rise of the New Imperialism. Macmillan. ISBN 9781429959155.
- Hamilton, Lee H.; Inouye, Daniel K. (1995). Report of the Congressional Committees Investigating the Iran/Contra Affair. DIANE Publishing. ISBN 9780788126024.
- Carothers, Thomas (1993). In the Name of Democracy: U.S. Policy Toward Latin America in the Reagan Years. University of California Press. ISBN 9780520082601.
