= Piazza Fontana: The Italian Conspiracy =

- Directed by: Marco Tullio Giordana
- Produced by: Fabio Massimo Cacciatori (executive producer)
- Starring: Valerio Mastandrea; Pierfrancesco Favino; Michela Cescon; Laura Chiatti; Fabrizio Gifuni; Luigi Lo Cascio; Giorgio Colangeli; Omero Antonutti; Thomas Trabacchi; Giorgio Tirabassi; Denis Fasolo; Giorgio Marchesi; Sergio Solli; Giulia Lazzarini; Luca Zingaretti
- Cinematography: Roberto Forza
- Music by: Franco Piersanti
- Release date: 30 March 2012
- Running time: 129 minutes
- Country: Italy
- Language: Italian

Romanzo di una strage (internationally released as Piazza Fontana: The Italian Conspiracy) is a 2012 Italian historical drama film directed by Marco Tullio Giordana. It is loosely based on the book Il segreto di Piazza Fontana by Paolo Cucchiarelli. The film deals with the reconstruction of the Piazza Fontana bombing that took place in Milan December 12, 1969, and of the tragic events that ensued, from the death of Giuseppe Pinelli, which occurred in mysterious circumstances during an interrogation, to the death of the Commissioner Luigi Calabresi, who had led the investigation.

In July 2012, Romanzo di una strage entered the 47th Karlovy Vary International Film Festival, where it won the Special Jury Prize. It was nominated to 16 David di Donatello awards, and won three (for best supporting actor, best supporting actress and best visual effects). It also won three Nastro d'Argento awards (for best script, best actor and best supporting actress) and two Ciak d'oro (for best supporting actor and best score).

== Plot ==
Milan, December 1969. Giuseppe Pinelli is a Milanese railway worker. A husband, father, and anarchist, he animates and inspires the Ponte della Ghisolfa Anarchist Circle. Luigi Calabresi is deputy head of the Political Police at Milan's Police Headquarters. Husband, father, and commissioner, he follows and monitors the political opinions of the extra-parliamentary left. Engaged with intelligence and rigor on opposing fronts, they meet and clash between marches and summonses. The explosion at the Banca Nazionale dell'Agricoltura in Piazza Fontana, which killed 17 people and injured 88, causes a national collapse and tensions in that "cordial correspondence". Summoned on the evening of the attack and questioned for three days, Pinelli dies under mysterious circumstances, falling from the window of Calabresi's office. Absent at the time of the tragic event, the commissioner ends up becoming both responsible and a victim. Relentlessly pursued by Lotta Continua members, implicated by the police and abandoned by the "leaders," he will continue to investigate the massacre, uncovering the involvement of the neo-fascist right wing in the Veneto region and the responsibility of state apparatuses. A rejected promotion and transfer will confirm his integrity, determining his fate.

== Cast ==
- Valerio Mastandrea: Luigi Calabresi
- Pierfrancesco Favino: Giuseppe Pinelli
- Bob Marchese: the President Judge Carlo Biotti
- Fabrizio Gifuni: Aldo Moro
- Omero Antonutti: Giuseppe Saragat
- Laura Chiatti: Gemma Calabresi
- Stefano Scandaletti: Pietro Valpreda
- Michela Cescon: Licia Pinelli
- Giorgio Colangeli: Federico Umberto D'Amato
- Luigi Lo Cascio: Judge Paolillo
- Giorgio Tirabassi: the professor
- Giorgio Marchesi: Franco Freda
- Denis Fasolo: Giovanni Ventura
- Gianni Musy: confessor of Moro
- Luca Zingaretti: the doctor
- Francesco Salvi: Cornelio Rolandi
- Corrado Invernizzi: Judge Pietro Calogero
