= Digilio =

Digilio or DiGilio is a surname of Italian origin. Notable people with the surname include:

- Carlo Digilio (1937–2005), Italian terrorist, soldier and secret agent
- John DiGilio (1932–1988), American mobster
- Nick Digilio (born 1965), American film critic and radio personality
