= Carlo Digilio =

Italian terrorist

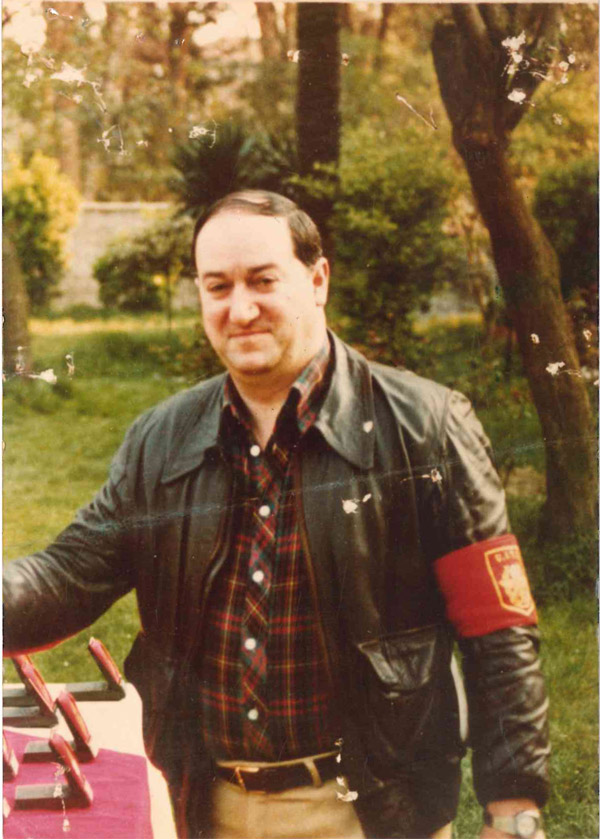
- Carlo Digilio in the 1970s
- Born: 7 May 1937; Rome, Italy
- Died: 12 December 2005 (aged 68)
- Occupation(s): terrorist, soldier
- Height: 1.79 m (5 ft 10 in)

Carlo Digilio, also known as Zio Otto (7 May 1937 – 12 December 2005), was an Italian terrorist, soldier, and self-styled secret agent. He belonged to the neo-fascist group Ordine Nuovo and later became a collaborator. At the end of the first-degree process, he was convicted for the Piazza Fontana bombing, but the reliefs of law extinguished his guilt. He was also involved in the Piazza della Loggia bombing.

== Life ==
Born in Rome in 1937, Digilio's family moved to Venice, and at the beginning of the 1960s, he enrolled at the Faculty of Economics and Commerce, but did not complete his studies. He declared that the military service and the death of his father Michelangelo during a car accident in 1967, forced him to become an informer of the NATO military bases in Veneto under the nickname of Erodoto, a nickname that his father had used before him. He also claimed, without any proof, that the CIA and the Italian intelligence agencies recruited Digllio in their military force of anti-communists and fascists.

Subsequently, he joined the Neo-Fascist and Neo-Nazi Venetian group Ordine Nuovo. Digilio was an artillery artificer and explosives expert within the Paduan cell of Franco Freda and Giovanni Ventura. He admitted to having participated in the failed golpe, before taking part in the Piazza Fontana bombing. Digilio declared he had inspected the devices used in Milan and the Piazza della Loggia bombing, a possible backstage of the Milan police headquarters bombing. Additionally, he claimed Gianfranco Bertoli (1933-2000) was an infiltrator, and not an anarchist.

Digilio, Martino Siciliano and Delfo Zorzi were charged with having materially executed the Piazza Fontana's massacre on 12 December 1969. In the following years, Zorzi escaped to Japan.

When Ordine Nuovo was banned in compliance with the law against the reconstitution of the Fascist Party, Digilio built up contacts with the Nuclei Armati Rivoluzionari. In July 1982 he was jailed for a short time in Venice, after the Bologna massacre, while he was working as a secretary in the Lido di Venezia's shooting range. He migrated to Santo Domingo, where he married and the couple had a daughter. Digillio claimed, again without any proof, that during this period he continued to collaborate with the American secret services, while recruiting Cuban exiles to be used against Fidel Castro.

In fall 1992, he was arrested under an international warrant and returned to Italy, where he was sentenced to 10 years. Digilio became the first collaborator of so-called black extremism. He testified to have worked with Franco Freda, Delfo Zorzi (who was absolved), and Carlo Maria Maggi (a member of the Venetian section). In 1994, Digilio and Martino Siciliano asserted that Delfo Zorzi -and not the anarchist Pietro Valpreda- had been the material executor who had placed a bomb in front of the Banca Nazionale dell'Agricoltura, in Milan. They also declared that, in doing so, Zorzi had been helped by the son of a banking director. Subsequently, Valpreda was processed and absolved of these charges. In 1995, his deposition against Zorzi was declared to be unreliable due to a stroke that had caused memory loss.

Zorzi was acquitted from the charges related to the Piazza Fontana and Piazza della Loggia bombing. He was exclusively condemned for the assassination attempt to the Slovenian school of Trieste (without victims) and to the boundary stone.

Thanks to the reliefs of law, Digilio's actions around the Piazza Fontana bombing were not chargeable, and his lawyers didn't appeal. The judges also ascertained his involvement in the Piazza Della Loggia bombing.

Digilio spent his last years within the protection program under the name of Mario Rossi. He died in a rest home in Bergamo on 12 December 2005, the 36th anniversary of the Piazza Fontana massacre.
