= Carlo Biotti =

Italian judge

- Born: 1901
- Died: 10 December 1977 (aged 75–76); Milan
- Occupation: magistrate

Carlo Biotti (1901 – 10 December 1977) was an Italian judge, the President of the Court of Milan and a Magistrate of the Supreme Court of Cassation. His forced recusal from the case brought by the widow of Giuseppe Pinelli against the police commissioner Luigi Calabresi in 1971 became a cause célèbre.

Biotti was the presiding judge in the case brought by the widow of Giuseppe Pinelli against the police commissioner Luigi Calabresi. Calabresi had led the investigation into the Piazza Fontana bombing. Pinelli died in mysterious circumstances during a police interrogation following the bombing. On 27 May 1971, Biotti was recused at the request of Calabresi's lawyer, who claimed that in a private conversation Biotti had admitted that for career reasons he had already formed an opinion on the case. It was a claim that Biotti vehemently denied. Calabresi's attorney sought the recusal when Biotti ordered that Pinelli's body be exhumed. Neither Biotti nor his two fellow judges were convinced that Pinelli had died from falling from the police station window. His forced recusal not only prevented the exhumation of Pinelli's body, but delayed the investigation for two years.

Biotti fought for years to clear his name and in November 1974 was completely exonerated by the Court of Florence. He died three years later at the age of 76. In the 2012 film Piazza Fontana: The Italian Conspiracy, the character of Carlo Biotti is played by Bob Marchese.

From 1964 Biotti was also a director of A.C. Milan.
