= The Funeral of the Anarchist Pinelli =

1972 mixed-media artwork by Enrico Baj

The Funeral Of The Anarchist Pinelli is a 1972 artwork by the Italian artist Enrico Baj (1924–2003) and is his most noted and controversial piece. It is a large scale mixed-media twelve meter long installation which encompasses an entire wall and moves out onto the floor. The work makes direct reference to Carlo Carrà's 1911 Futurist painting The Funeral of the Anarchist Galli, which is the earlier artist's most famous work.

The work was inspired by the 1969 death of political activist Pino Pinelli who suspiciously died after falling from a window at Milan Police headquarters where he was being detained on the suspicion of involvement in the massacre at Piazza Fontana.

The work was created for the Palazzo Reale in Milan. Therein the work was set to be displayed in the Great Hall of Caryatids of the palazzo, in the spring of 1972 but on the day of its opening, the Police Commissioner of Milan Luigi Calabresi was assassinated by members of Lotta Continua and the exhibition was delayed indefinitely. The work was finally exhibited at the Palazzo Reale in the summer of 2012 and again at the palazzo on the occasion of the 2024 retrospective of Baj's work honoring the hundredth anniversary of his birth.

The work has been exhibited at the Museo del Novecento in Milan since February 2025.

The work is also partly based on Pablo Picasso's 1937 mural Guernica.
