= 12 dicembre =

- Directed by: Giovanni Bonfanti; Pier Paolo Pasolini (uncredited)
- Produced by: Alberto Grimaldi (uncredited); Giovanni Bonfanti
- Cinematography: Sebastiano Celeste; Dimitri Nicolau; Giuseppe Pinori; Enzo Tosi; Roberto Lombardi
- Edited by: Giovanni Bonfanti; Lamberto Mancini; Maurizio Ponzi; Pier Paolo Pasolini (uncredited)
- Music by: Pino Masi
- Production companies: Lotta Continua; European Associated Productions
- Distributed by: Circolo Ottobre (Italy)
- Release date: 1972
- Running time: 43 min (shortened version); 104 min (full version)
- Country: Italy
- Language: Italian

12 dicembre, also known as Dodici dicembre (eng: December 12th), is a 1972 documentary film directed by Giovanni Bonfanti and Pier Paolo Pasolini (uncredited).

It is an independent documentary about the Piazza Fontana bombing and the death of anarchist Giuseppe Pinelli.

== Content ==
The documentary investigates the Piazza Fontana bombing and the death of anarchist Giuseppe Pinelli, who was taken in by the Italian police for questioning and whose death is believed by some to have been deliberately caused by members of the police force. Through various interviews conducted throughout Italy, it analyses the political climate of the country. Among those interviewed are workers and militants from the Lotta Continua movement, as well as deputy Achille Stuani, member of the Italian Communist Party; Licia Pinelli, Giuseppe's widow, and several lawyers including those who defended Pietro Valpreda, who was arrested for the bombing.

== Production ==
=== Development ===
The film was made by Pier Paolo Pasolini on the proposal and with the collaboration of some militants of Lotta Continua, a formation of the communist-oriented far-left. During the making of the film, there were creative differences between Pasolini and the group's management. Pasolini wanted to make a denunciation film which would focus on the anthropological and social aspect of the country during that period. The disagreements continued throughout the editing phase.

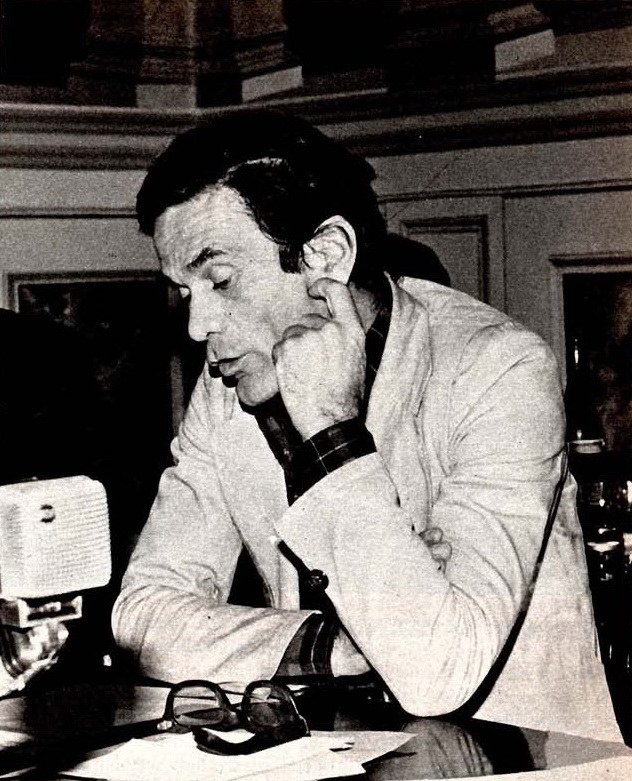
Pasolini in 1975

Why did I make this film together with a group of young comrades from Lotta Continua? There is certainly a reason, but, to be honest, I can't say. I criticized at the time, violently and perhaps inappropriately, the political action of young people: many of my criticisms have unfortunately turned out to be right, and I do not abjure them. However, it seems to me that the real revolutionary tension is experienced today by far-left minorities. The global and almost intolerant criticism that these express against the Italian state and capitalist society finds me in complete agreement in substance, even if not often in form. Therefore, as long as I am capable, and have the strength, it is them that I side with...

— Pier Paolo Pasolini in Cinema in the Form of Poetry, Pordenone, Cinemazero, 1979; p. 97

In an interview with Panorama on 31 December 1970, Pasolini mentioned Attacco al Power (Attack on Power) and 1969 among the film's provisional titles.

=== Filming ===
Filming began on December 12, 1970 and concluded in June of the following year. It took place in the quarries of Carrara, in Milan, Viareggio, Naples and at the Musocco cemetery, Pinelli's burial place. The film was financed by Alberto Grimaldi.

=== Editing ===
During filming, 80,000m of film was used, but only 4000m was edited; the remainder is considered lost. The montage was carried out entirely by Pasolini.

=== Soundtrack ===
The music in the film was composed by Pino Masi, then a member of Lotta Continua.

=== Credits ===
In order to avoid any potential problems with the law, Pasolini and Grimaldi decided to leave their names out of the film's credits.

== Distribution ==
In Italy the film was first distributed by Circolo Ottobre on 20 May 1972. The documentary was also presented in the same year at the Berlin Film Festival and on October 31, 2014 at the Vienna International Film Festival

The shortened version of the film is available on YouTube.

=== Home video edition ===
The shortened version was released in 1995 on VHS and in 2011 on DVD.

=== Full version ===
In 2013, the full version of the film, considered lost, was found in a film archive in Hamburg. This version, after being restored by the German publishing house Laika Verlag and the Fondazione Cineteca di Bologna, was screened in Bologna in 2015 during the Cinema Ritrovato event.

== Reception ==
Il Morandini gives the film 3 stars out of 5. The documentary was reviewed by Alberto Moravia on 30 April 1972 in L'Espresso.
