= Biotti =

Biotti is an Italian surname. Notable people with the surname include:

- Carlo Biotti, Italian jurist
- Chris Biotti, ice hockey player
- Brent Biotti, submariner
