= Andrea Salsedo =

Italian anarchist (1881–1920)

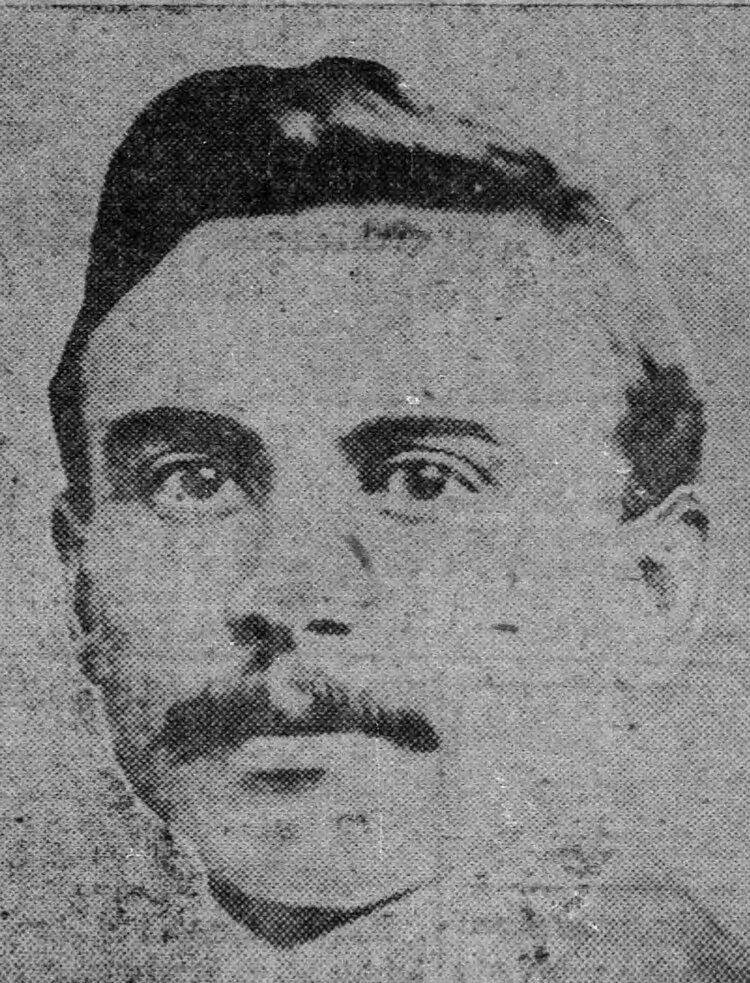
- Born: Andrea Salsedo; 24 September 1881; Pantelleria, Italy
- Died: 3 May 1920 (aged 38); New York City, United States
- Known for: Galleanist who died under mysterious circumstances

Andrea Salsedo (21 September 1881 – 3 May 1920) was an Italian anarchist whose death caused controversy as it was caused by a suspicious fall from the Justice Department's Bureau of Investigation (BOI) offices on 15 Park Row in New York City. Depending on the source, his death was either a suicide, or a homicide committed by detaining officers. The case was widely debated both for its unclear nature and for its consequences on the Bureau, and was one of the premises of the Sacco and Vanzetti case.

== Early life ==
Salsedo was born on 21 September 1881 in Pantelleria, in the Italian region of Sicily. A committed anarchist since his youth, he soon became involved in local politics, and was part of the anarchist club Circolo Sociale founded by Luigi Galleani, who was in Pantelleria as he had been exiled there. In those years, Salsedo became a personal friend of Galleani. On 11 November 1900, he was tried because of subversive views he had expressed in a letter published in L'Avvenire Sociale, a newspaper published in Messina. The trial did not lead to any conviction.

== Galleanists ==
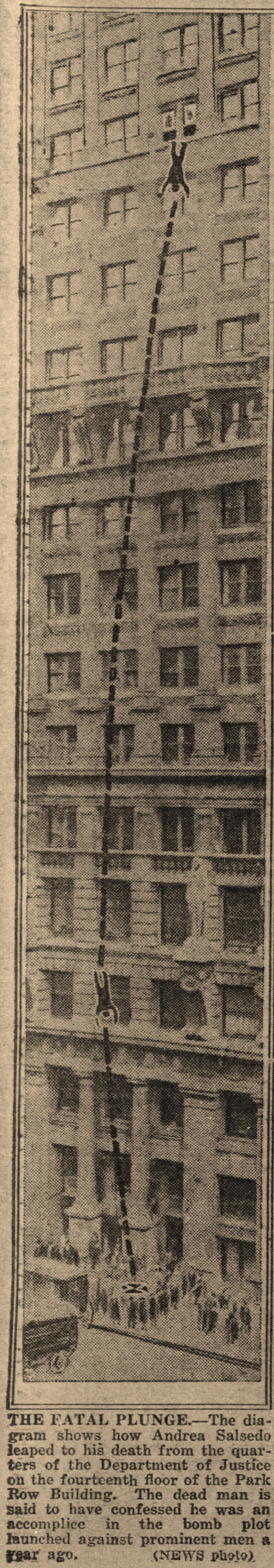
A diagram showing Salsedo's fall

Salsedo then moved to the United States, and after a brief period in Tunisia, he arrived in New York City in 1910. There, he met his friend Galleani and supported him in the creation and distribution of his magazine Cronaca Sovversiva. Salsedo wrote a number of articles for the magazine. The Justice Department of New York included Salsedo in a list of anarchists who fled to Mexico in order to avoid military service. The list included Nicola Sacco, Bartolomeo Vanzetti, Roberto Elia, and Galleani.

All anarchists who were part of Galleani's acquaintances, who were also called "Galleanists", were put under surveillance, as they were considered dangerous and possible terrorists. On 25 February 1920, Salsedo, who was working in the Canzani Printshop as a typesetter at the time, was arrested and brought to the BOI offices on Park Row during or immediately after the Palmer Raids.

== Death ==
Salsedo was considered to be one of the writers of the radical pamphlet Plain Words. At the BOI offices, Salsedo was harshly interrogated and was denied the right to phone his lawyer and his family. According to some sources, he stayed in the offices for eight weeks, incommunicado. On 3 May 1920, his body was found on the pavement in front of the BOI offices; he had fallen from the 14th floor.

How Salsedo died is still unclear. Some sources say that he got up at night, silently walked across the room and jumped out the window, killing himself. According to Roberto Elia, Salsedo could have been killed for fear of betraying other fellow anarchists. The Boston Herald reported that before dying, Salsedo gave names of other anarchists. Other sources say that Salsedo was severely beaten numerous times during his interrogations, and was ultimately killed by officers, who hurled him out the window.

Salsedo's death happened just two days prior to Sacco and Vanzetti's arrest. Notably, his name was referenced in Dario Fo's play Accidental Death of an Anarchist (1970). While the play was about the death of Giuseppe Pinelli, another anarchist who died after falling from a window while in police custody, Fo used Salsedo's name to avoid any repercussion.

== See also ==
- Anarchism in Italy
- Anarchism in the United States
- Pietro Valpreda
