= Gianadelio Maletti =

Italian general

- Born: September 30, 1921; Milan, Kingdom of Italy (now Milan, Italy)
- Died: June 9, 2021 (aged 99); Johannesburg, South Africa
- Citizenship: Italy, South Africa
- Father: Pietro Maletti

Gianadelio Maletti (Milan, September 30, 1921 – Johannesburg, June 9, 2021) was an Italian general and secret agent who later became a naturalized South African citizen. He was also the former head of Department D (counter-espionage) of the SID, the military intelligence agency of Italy.

== Biography ==
Maletti was descended from a family of Piedmontese generals. His father, Pietro Maletti, was one of the principal figures responsible for the Debra Libanòs massacre and died in the North African campaign on December 9, 1940. Maletti embarked upon a military career, becoming an Italian Army officer; and in 1967, he served as the military attaché at the Italian Embassy in Athens. On June 15, 1971, holding the rank of Colonel, he was assigned to the SID, the Italian intelligence service, where he would eventually become head of Department D (for Counter-intelligence).

Promoted to general and appointed the service's "number two," Maletti came into conflict with the Director of the SID, General Vito Miceli, a pro-Arab figure, whereas Maletti maintained ties with the Israeli and American intelligence services. This rift persisted until Miceli's arrest in July 1974. In October 1975, Maletti was relieved of his post by Defense Minister, Arnaldo Forlani, but he was later appointed a major general and placed in command of the 21st Infantry Division "Granatieri di Sardegna".

In 1980, he left Italy, for South Africa where he lived in a residential neighborhood of Johannesburg. He died in Johannesburg on June 9, 2021, at the age of nearly one hundred.

In mid-March 2022, the publisher Mursia posthumously published his book Memoriale: Non solo Piazza Fontana, which was edited by Concetta Argiolas.

== Involvement in legal charges ==
On February 28, 1976, Maletti and Captain Antonio Labruna were arrested on charges of attempting to facilitate the escape of Giovanni Ventura, as well as charges of falsifying public documents and aiding and abetting Guido Giannettini and Marco Pozzan in connection with the investigation into the Piazza Fontana bombing. After a trial lasting two years, the Court of Assizes of Catanzaro, on February 23, 1979, sentenced Maletti to four years and Labruna to two years of imprisonment for aiding and abetting. A South African citizen since 1981, he resided there until his death in June 2021. On appeal, on March 20, 1981, Maletti was sentenced to two years. In 1987, the Court of Assizes of Appeal of Bari—following a remand order issued by the Court of Cassation—upheld the conviction as final.

In 2000, while in South Africa, he gave an interview to the daily newspaper La Repubblica, in which he discussed the CIA's involvement in the massacres perpetrated by right-wing groups. According to Maletti, the agency did not play a decisive role in selecting the timing or targets of these attacks; however, it did supply *Ordine Nuovo* with equipment and explosives (originating from West Germany)—including, according to investigations conducted at the time by the SID, the very explosives used in the Piazza Fontana massacre. Maletti maintained that the objective behind this conduct was to foster a climate conducive to a Coup d'état—one similar to the military takeover that had taken place in Greece in 1967. In the interview, Maletti also stated that the SID—despite having informed the government of its findings—was never asked to intervene, and that the CIA, through infiltrators and collaborators, served as a "liaison between various Italian and German far-right groups."

In connection with the "Borghese coup," on June 27, 1974, he handed over to the Minister of Defense, Giulio Andreotti, a selection of incriminating documents produced by his Unit against the coup plotters. However, from this selection, he omitted the files pertaining to the involvement in the coup of figures of the stature of Licio Gelli and Giovanni Torrisi. He carried out a further winnowing alongside Andreotti himself—so much so that the surviving materials handed over to the judiciary on September 15, 1974, were reduced, as Judge Guido Salvini recently noted, to "three meager little bundles." These files nonetheless served to initiate a trial against the coup plotters, but they proved insufficient to judicially substantiate the defendants' culpability. Indeed, following an initial conviction, all of them were ultimately acquitted—even those who had confessed to the crime.

The historian Fulvio Mazza—endorsed by Giovanni Pellegrino, Chairman of the Parliamentary Commission on Massacres—encapsulated the General's strategy of obstruction and misdirection regarding the Borghese coup (and other events) within the concept of the "Maletti Doctrine." This strategy consisted of a deliberate effort to shield figures "close" to the State apparatus—specifically: Licio Gelli (head of the P2 Masonic lodge), Giovanni Torrisi (Chief of Staff of the Navy, and subsequently of the Defense Staff), Pietro Cangioli (a medical officer), and others—not so much out of any shared complicity in their actions, but rather to safeguard the reputation of the State institutions themselves.

Thanks to a safe conduct, he returned to Italy on March 20, 2001, to testify at the Piazza Fontana trial, where he reiterated that the "strategy of massacres" had an international origin. When asked why he had not informed the judiciary, he replied: "Until 1974, no one had explained to us that we had to defend the Constitution".

=== Membership in the P2 Lodge ===
In 1981, his name was found on the list of affiliates of the Propaganda Due, also known as the P2 masonic lodge (Rome, file 499), although Maletti denied any involvement with the lodge, stating that he had received an invitation to join from Licio Gelli (whom he had met in 1973) but had declined.

== Honors ==
Commander of the Order of Merit of the Italian Republic - ribbon for ordinary uniform

Commander of the Order of Merit of the Italian Republic
— 2 giugno 1975; Onorificenza revocata ope legis per effetto della sentenza definitiva di condanna e della conseguente interdizione perpetua dai pubblici uffici.

== See also ==
- Years of Lead
- Strategy of Tension
- P2
- Greek Junta
