= Accidental Death of an Anarchist =

1970 play by Dario Fo

- Cover of a 2004 Italian edition of Morte accidentale di un anarchico
- Original language: Italian
- Written by: Dario Fo
- Characters: Maniac; Inspector Bertozzo; Inspector Pissani; The Constable; The Superintendent; Maria Feletti
- Subject: Police corruption; the death of Italian anarchist Giuseppe Pinelli; Piazza Fontana bombing
- Genre: Political farce
- Setting: Central Police Headquarters, Milan

Premiere
- Date: 5 December 1970
- Place: Capannone di Via Colletta, Milan

Accidental Death of an Anarchist (Italian: Morte accidentale di un anarchico) is a play by Italian playwright Dario Fo that premiered in 1970. It has been performed across the world in more than forty countries. The play is based on the 1969 Piazza Fontana bombing and on the death of Giuseppe Pinelli, an Italian anarchist, during a police interrogation.

== Plot ==
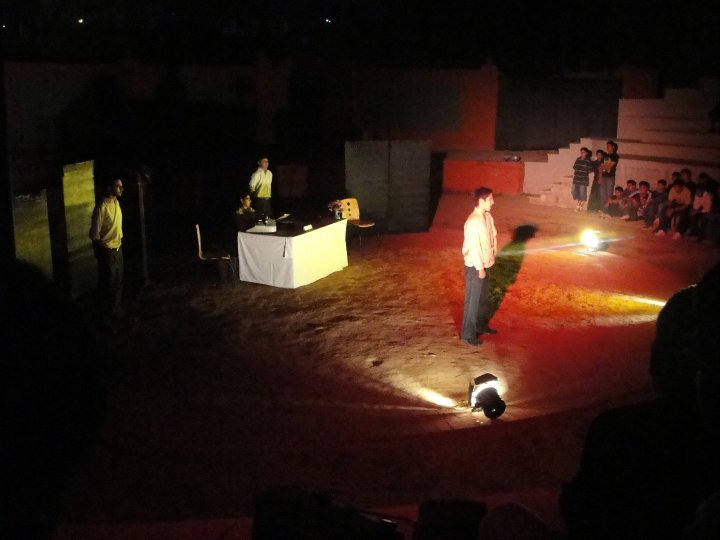
A 2009 production of the play at The Doon School in India

The play opens with Inspector Francesco Bertozzo interrogating a clever, quick-witted and mischievous fraudster, simply known as the Maniac, in Bertozzo's office on the third floor of the police headquarters in Milan. The Maniac constantly outsmarts the dim-witted Bertozzo and, when Bertozzo leaves the room, intercepts a phone call from Inspector Pissani. Pissani reveals to the Maniac that a judge is due at the police station to investigate the interrogation of an "accidental" death of the anarchist, while the Maniac pretends to be a colleague of Bertozzo's and tells Pissani that Bertozzo is "blowing a raspberry" at him. The Maniac decides to impersonate the judge, Marco Malipiero, an opportunity he has been waiting a while for, and to humiliate the policemen responsible for the "accidental" death of an Anarchist. After Bertozzo re-enters his office, the Maniac is forced out of the office, taking Bertozzo's coat and hat to use in his disguise. Bertozzo chases him, running into Pissani, who punches him in retaliation for "blowing a raspberry" at him.

The Maniac, now impersonating Malipiero, finds Pissani and his lackey, the Constable, in the room where the anarchist was during his interrogation. Telling them that he is Malipiero, the Maniac asks for the Superintendent, who was involved with the interrogation with Pissani and the Constable. The Maniac orders the three policemen to re-enact the events of the interrogation; in turn fabricating many of the events, such as changing beating the anarchist to making jokes with him, incorporating new lines into the transcript and even breaking out in song. When the investigation reaches the matter of the fall, the Constable reveals he grabbed the anarchist's shoe, in an attempt to stop him from falling. However, the Maniac notes that witnesses reported that the anarchist had both shoes on. When Pissani surmises that the anarchist was wearing a galosh, the Superintendent breaks into a rage, making Pissani accidentally reveal that the Superintendent pushed the anarchist out of the window. The two policemen then realise that the Maniac was listening. The phone in the office suddenly rings, which Pissani answers. He tells them that it is a journalist called Maria Feletti, whom the Superintendent agreed to meet to clear rumors about the interrogation, wanting to come up to the office.

As the presence of Judge Malipiero would endanger them, the policemen tell the Maniac to leave for the time being. Instead, the Maniac intends to disguise himself as a forensic expert from Rome, Captain Piccini. The Maniac leaves the office. Feletti nearly exposes the three policemen, until the Maniac re-enters, as an extravagantly-dressed amputee. The Maniac manages to concoct a story on how the anarchist died: one of the impatient policemen hit the anarchist in the neck, an ambulance being called; the anarchist then being led to the window for fresh air, and pushed accidentally out of the window due to uncoordinated balance between the two policemen leading him to the window. Feletti is unconvinced, noting how the death of the anarchist was reported by the police to be a suicide, opposed to their original comment that it was "accidental". Bertozzo suddenly enters, delivering a replica of a bomb from another attack. Bertozzo partially recognises the Maniac, as he knows Captain Piccini, but is dissuaded by Pissani and the Superintendent. Feletti begins to pick out the inconsistencies in the policemen's stories, and showing that bombers in Milan are fascists, not revolutionaries.

Bertozzo realises that "Piccini" is the Maniac, after seeing his coat and hat on a stand. Bertozzo, holding the policemen at gunpoint, orders Feletti to cuff the three policemen; getting the Maniac to show them his medical records, exposing him as a fraud. The Maniac reveals a tape recorder, which he used to record Pissani and the Superintendent's tirade, exposing their crime. The Maniac strips off his disguise, making him recognizable to Feletti, who identifies him as Paulo Davidovitch Gandolpho, the "Prose Pimpernel of the Permanent Revolution" and "notorious sports editor of Lotta Continua". Revealing that the bomb replica can in fact work, setting it off on a timer, the Maniac has Bertozzo join his fellow policemen. Feletti attempts to stop the Maniac, citing the Maniac as an "extremist" and "fanatic". The Maniac, instead of killing her, offers her an ultimatum: save the four corrupt policemen, acquitting them and the Maniac will be put behind bars; or leave them to die for their crime and unwittingly join the extremist movement as an accomplice. The Maniac then leaves to spread the recording.

The Maniac then addresses the audience, showing what the scenario entails. When Feletti leaves them, the four policemen die in the resulting explosion. However, the Maniac then offers the second result: sticking to the rule of law, Feletti releases them, but is chained to the window by the policemen when they realize that Feletti knows what they did. The Maniac then leaves the audience to decide which ending they prefer.

== Adaptations and legacy ==
A Hindi adaptation of the play, Bechara Mara Gaya, was made into a film. Another earlier adaptation, Dhool Me Lipta Sach, ran in Pune. A Chinese adaptation with some changes to the original script was directed by Meng Jinghui.

Ed Emery was the translator for an authorised English-language version of the play. In 1979, Gavin Richards of the socialist political theatre group Belt and Braces developed an adaptation that was staged at London's Wyndham's Theatre with both Richards and Alfred Molina alternating in the lead role of "The Maniac", for which Richards was nominated for an Olivier Award. A TV movie of the play, with the Belt and Braces cast and Richards once more in the lead, was commissioned by Channel 4 in 1983 and broadcast the subsequent year.

A sequel, Pum pum! Chi è? La polizia! (Knock Knock! Who's There? The Police!), was written in 1974. Semiotician Umberto Eco commented favourably on the sequel in his column in the newspaper L'Espresso.

An English adaptation by Tom Basden starring Daniel Rigby premiered at the Crucible Theatre, Sheffield in October 2022 before transferring to the Lyric Theatre, Hammersmith in May 2023 and then the Theatre Royal Haymarket in London's West End in June 2023.

An English adaptation by Wild Rice, Singapore under the leadership of Ivan Heng, co-directed by Jo Kukathas and Glen Goei starring Ghafir Akbar was premiered on 28 September 2024 in Singapore, two preview shows scheduled for 26 and 27 September 2024 were cancelled as the script had not received the requisite approvals.

== See also ==
- Strategy of tension

== Bibliography ==
- Mitchell, Tony (1999). Dario Fo: People's Court Jester (Updated and Expanded). London: Methuen. ISBN 0-413-73320-3.
