= Giuseppe Pinelli =

Italian anarchist (1928–1969)

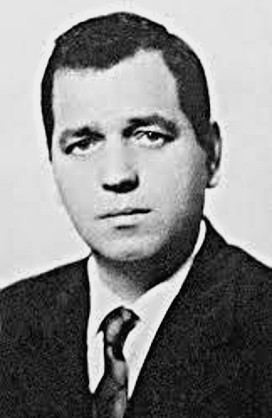
- Pinelli in 1969
- Born: 21 October 1928; Milan, Italy
- Died: 15 December 1969 (aged 41); Milan, Italy
- Cause of death: Defenestration
- Occupation: Railroad worker
- Movement: Anarchism

Giuseppe "Pino" Pinelli (21 October 1928 – 15 December 1969) was an Italian railroad worker and anarchist, who died while being detained by the Polizia di Stato in 1969. Pinelli was a member of the Milan-based anarchist association named Ponte della Ghisolfa. He was also the secretary of the Italian branch of the Anarchist Black Cross. His death, believed by many to have been caused by members of the police, inspired Nobel Prize laureate Dario Fo to write his famous 1970 play titled Accidental Death of an Anarchist.

== Early life ==
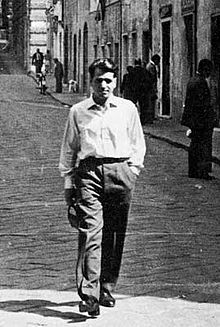
Pinelli in 1955

Pinelli was born in Milan to Alfredo Pinelli and Rosa Malacarne. His family was working-class in one of the poorest areas of post-World War I Milan. Although he had to work in many low-income jobs, such as waiter and warehouseman, in order to make ends meet, he nonetheless found the time to read many books and become politically active throughout his youth. Among other political activities, he also worked with the anarchist group that published the weekly paper Il Libertario (The Libertarian).

In 1944, Pinelli was a member of the Italian resistance movement within the Franco Brigade, and worked with a group of anarchist partisans that introduced him to libertarian thought. In 1954, he found work as a railroad fitter. In 1955, Pinelli married Licia Rognini, whom he had met at an evening class of Esperanto. During the 1960s, he continued anarchist activism. He organized young anarchists in the Gioventù Libertaria (Libertarian Youth) in 1962. In 1965, he helped found the Anarchist Association named after Sacco and Vanzetti. He also founded the Ponte della Ghisolfa association (named after the nearby bridge) in 1968.

== Suspicious circumstances surrounding his death ==
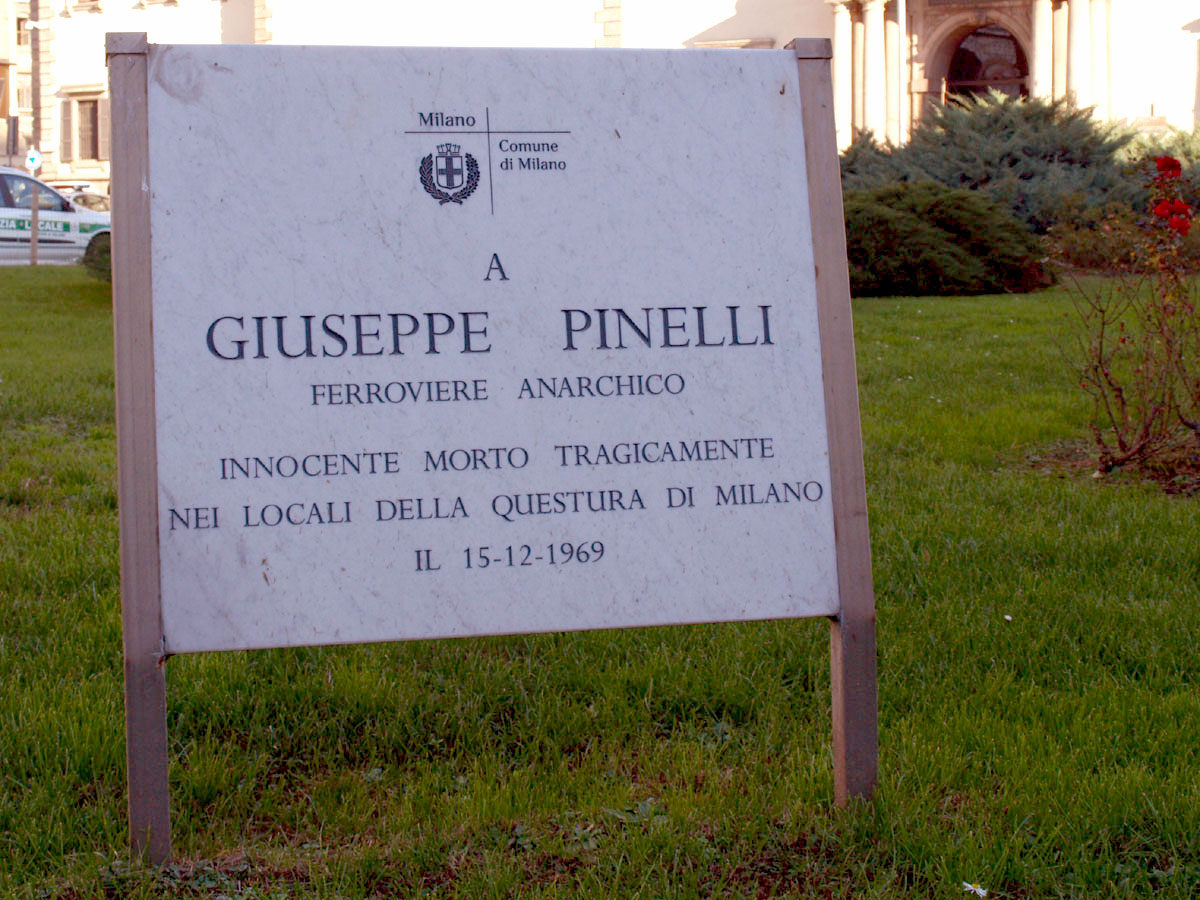
The new memorial tag in memory of Pinelli; the old one is still there.

On 12 December 1969, a bomb exploded at the Piazza Fontana in Milan; it killed 17 people and injured 88. Pinelli was picked up, along with other anarchists, for questioning regarding the attack. Just before midnight on 15 December 1969, Pinelli was seen to fall to his death from a fourth-floor window of the Milan police station. His death was widely believed to have been caused by members of the police. Police Commissioner Marcello Guida stated that "Pinelli made a feline leap toward the window, which had been left ajar due to the heat, and threw himself into the void" (subsequently, Brigadiers Vito Panessa and Carlo Mainardi no longer referred to a "feline leap", but only to the sudden opening of the casement and a leap into the void), Brigadier Pietro Mucilli said he did not see him as he threw himself from the window, and Vito Panessa said to even managed to grab Pinelli and a shoe was left in his hand, even though the body was wearing both shoes. Three police officers interrogating Pinelli, including Commissioner Luigi Calabresi, were put under investigation in 1971 for his death; legal proceedings concluded it was due to accidental causes, citing active illness. He was 41, and was survived by his wife and two young daughters.

Since his death, Pinelli's name was cleared, and the far-right Ordine Nuovo was accused of the 1969 Piazza Fontana bombing. In 2001, three neo-fascists were convicted, a sentence that was overturned in March 2004; a fourth defendant, Carlo Digilio, was a suspected CIA informant who became a witness for the state and received immunity from prosecution. (Note: The Italian justice uses a system of state witnesses, who are known as pentiti or collaboratori di giustizia (collaborators with justice) to fight against terrorism and the mafia.) Calabresi was later killed by two shots from a revolver outside his home in 1972. In 1988, former Lotta Continua leader Adriano Sofri was arrested with Ovidio Bompressi and Giorgio Pietrostefani for Calabresi's murder. The charges against them were based on testimony provided 16 years later by Leonardo Marino, an ex-militant who confessed to the murder of Calabresi under order from Sofri. Claiming his innocence, Sofri was finally convicted after a highly contentious trial in 1997.

In 2022, as part of an investigative podcast about the Piazza Fontana bombing by Il Fatto Quotidiano, the then 99-years-old General Gianadelio Maletti, former number two of Servizio Informazioni Difesa, the secret service of Italy's Ministry of Defence between 1971 and 1975, who was definitively sentenced to 12 months in prison for the misdirections on the Piazza Fontana investigations and had been at large in South Africa since 1980, discussed the death of Pinelli. He described Pinelli's suicide as "a hoax", as General Vito Miceli had reportedly confided to him. Brigadier Vito Panessa was also quoted as saying that one of the policemen who were in the room of Calabresi that night had joked: "Pinelli asked for it that night." According to Panessa, there was not just an unexpected incident involving somewhat harsh policemen but someone who had taken revenge on Pinelli, who persisted in not confessing after three days of illegal interrogation. Maletti concluded: "Pinelli refuses to answer questions. The interrogators then resort to stronger means and threaten to throw him out the window. They jerk him and force him to sit on the windowsill. With each negative response, Pinelli is pushed a little further towards the void. Finally, he loses his balance and falls."

== In popular culture ==
Pinelli's death is the inspiration for Dario Fo's 1970 play Accidental Death of an Anarchist, although in the original script his name was not mentioned explicitly. The political documentary film 12 dicembre (1972) directed by Giovanni Bonfanti about Pinelli's death was based on an idea by Pier Paolo Pasolini and included an interview to Pinelli's mother and wife. His death inspired the 1972 monumental mixed-media work The Funeral of the Anarchist Pinelli by Italian artist Enrico Baj. In Piazza Fontana: The Italian Conspiracy (2012), Pinelli was portrayed by Pierfrancesco Favino. Hints of his death are also in the songs "La ballata del Pinelli" (1969, with various versions), "Asilo 'Republic'" (1980) by Vasco Rossi, and "Quarant'anni" (1993) by the Modena City Ramblers, among others.

== See also ==
- Andrea Salsedo
- The Funeral of the Anarchist Pinelli
- Pietro Valpreda
- Police brutality
- Strategy of tension
