= The Almost Man =

- Film poster
- Norwegian: Mer eller mindre mann
- Directed by: Martin Lund
- Starring: Henrik Rafaelsen; Egil Birkeland
- Release date: 30 June 2012 (KVIFF)
- Running time: 75 minutes
- Country: Norway
- Language: Norwegian

The Almost Man (Norwegian: Mer eller mindre mann) is a 2012 Norwegian comedy film directed by Martin Lund. It won the 2012 Crystal Globe at the 47th Karlovy Vary International Film Festival and Henrik Rafaelsen won the Best Actor Award for his performance as Heinrik.
