= 47th Karlovy Vary International Film Festival =

2012 film festival edition

The 47th Karlovy Vary International Film Festival took place from 29 June to 7 July 2012. The Crystal Globe was won by The Almost Man, a Norwegian comedy film directed by Martin Lund. The second prize, the Special Jury Prize was won by Piazza Fontana: The Italian Conspiracy, an Italian drama film directed by Marco Tullio Giordana.

== Juries ==
The following people formed the jury of the festival:

Main competition

- Richard Peña, Grand Jury President (USA)
- Rajko Grlić (Croatia)
- Maria Hatzakou (Greece)
- Makram Khoury (Israel)
- Joanna Kos-Krauze (Poland)
- Ivo Mathé (Czech Republic)
- François Papineau (France)

Documentaries

- Ron Yerxa, Chairman (USA)
- José Luis Cienfuegos (Spain)
- Tizza Covi (Italy)
- Pamela Jahn (Germany)
- Jiří Konečný (Czech Republic)

East of the West

- Vladimir Blaževski, Chairman (Republic of Macedonia)
- Jaromír Blažejovský (Czech Republic)
- Natascha Drubek (Germany)
- Ágnes Kocsis (Hungary)
- John Nein (USA)

== Official selection awards ==
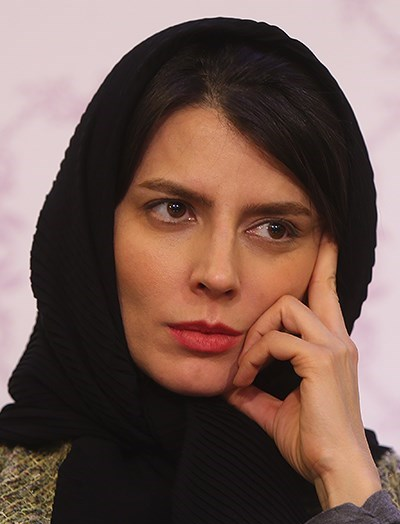
Leila Hatami, Best Actress

The following feature films and people received the official selection awards:

- Crystal Globe (Grand Prix) - The Almost Man (Mer eller mindre mann) by Martin Lund (Norway)
- Special Jury Prize - Piazza Fontana: The Italian Conspiracy (Romanzo di una strage) by Marco Tullio Giordana (Italy)
- Best Director Award - Rafaël Ouellet for Camion (Canada)
- Best Actress Award - Leila Hatami for her role in The Last Step (Pele Akher) (Iran)
- Best Actor Award (ex aequo):
  - Henrik Rafaelsen for his role in The Almost Man (Mer eller mindre mann) (Norway)
  - Eryk Lubos for his role in To Kill a Beaver (Zabić bobran) (Poland)
- Special mention of the jury - Pavel Liška, Tomáš Matonoha, Marek Daniel, Josef Polášek for their roles in Polski film by Marek Najbrt (Czech Republic, Poland) and Yannis Papadopoulos for his role in Boy Eating the Bird's Food (To agori troi to fagito tou pouliou) by Ektoras Lygizos

== Other statutory awards ==
Other statutory awards that were conferred at the festival:

- Best documentary film (over 30 min) - Sofia’s Last Ambulance (Poslednata lineika na Sofia) by Ilian Metev (Bulgaria, Croatia, Germany)
  - Special Mention - Private Universe (Soukromý vesmír) by Helena Třeštíková (Czech Republic)
- Best documentary film (under 30 min) - Story for the Modlins by Sergio Oksman (Spain)
- East of the West Award - House with a Turret (Dom s bashenkoy) by Eva Neymann (Ukraine)
  - Special Mention - Vanishing Waves (Aurora) by Kristina Buožytė & Bruno Samper (Lithuania, France, Belgium)
- Crystal Globe for Outstanding Artistic Contribution to World Cinema - Dame Helen Mirren (UK), Susan Sarandon (USA)
- Festival President's Award - Josef Somr (Czech Republic)
- Audience Award - Come as You Are (Hasta la vista) by Geoffrey Enthoven (Belgium)

== Non-statutory awards ==
The following non-statutory awards were conferred at the festival:

- FIPRESCI International Critics Award: The Last Step (Peleh akhar) by Ali Mosaffa (Iran)
- Ecumenical Jury Award: Camion by Rafaël Ouellet (Canada)
  - Special Mention: Hay Road (Estrada de Palha) by Rodrigo Areias (Portugal, Finland)
  - Special Mention: Lollipop Monster by Ziska Riemann (Germany)
- FEDEORA Award (East of the West section): Flower Buds (Poupata) by Zdeněk Jiráský (Czech Republic)
- Europa Cinemas Label: Piazza Fontana: The Italian Conspiracy (Romanzo di una strage) by Marco Tullio Giordana (Italy)
- NETPAC Award (ex aequo): Beyond the Hill (Tepenin ardi) by Emin Alper (Turkey, Greece)
