= Piazza Fontana bombing =

Terrorist attack carried out in Milan in 1969

Coordinates: 45°27′47″N 9°11′39″E

- Part of the Years of Lead
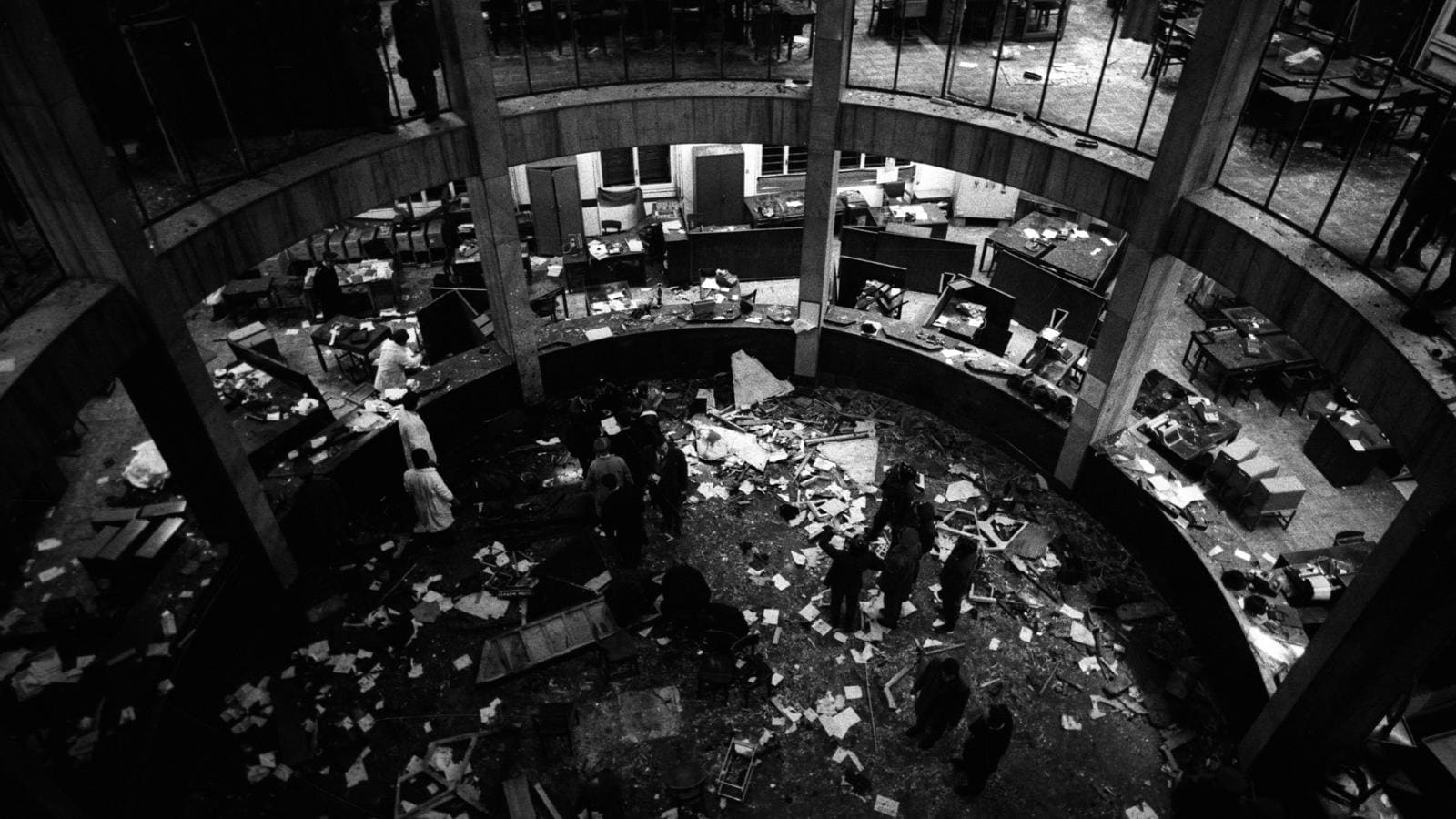
- The interior building after the bombing
- Location: Piazza Fontana, Milan, Italy
- Date: 12 December 1969; 16:45 (UTC+1)
- Target: Banca Nazionale dell'Agricoltura
- Attack type: Mass murder, bombing
- Weapon: Bomb
- Deaths: 17
- Injuries: 88
- Perpetrator: New Order

The Piazza Fontana bombing (Italian: Strage di Piazza Fontana) was a terrorist attack that occurred on 12 December 1969 when a bomb exploded at the headquarters of Banca Nazionale dell'Agricoltura (the National Agricultural Bank) in Piazza Fontana (near the Duomo) in Milan, Italy, killing 17 people and wounding 88. The same afternoon, another bomb exploded in a bank in Rome, and another was found unexploded in the Tomb of the Unknown Soldier. The attack was carried out by the neo-fascist paramilitary terrorist group Ordine Nuovo, and possibly undetermined collaborators.

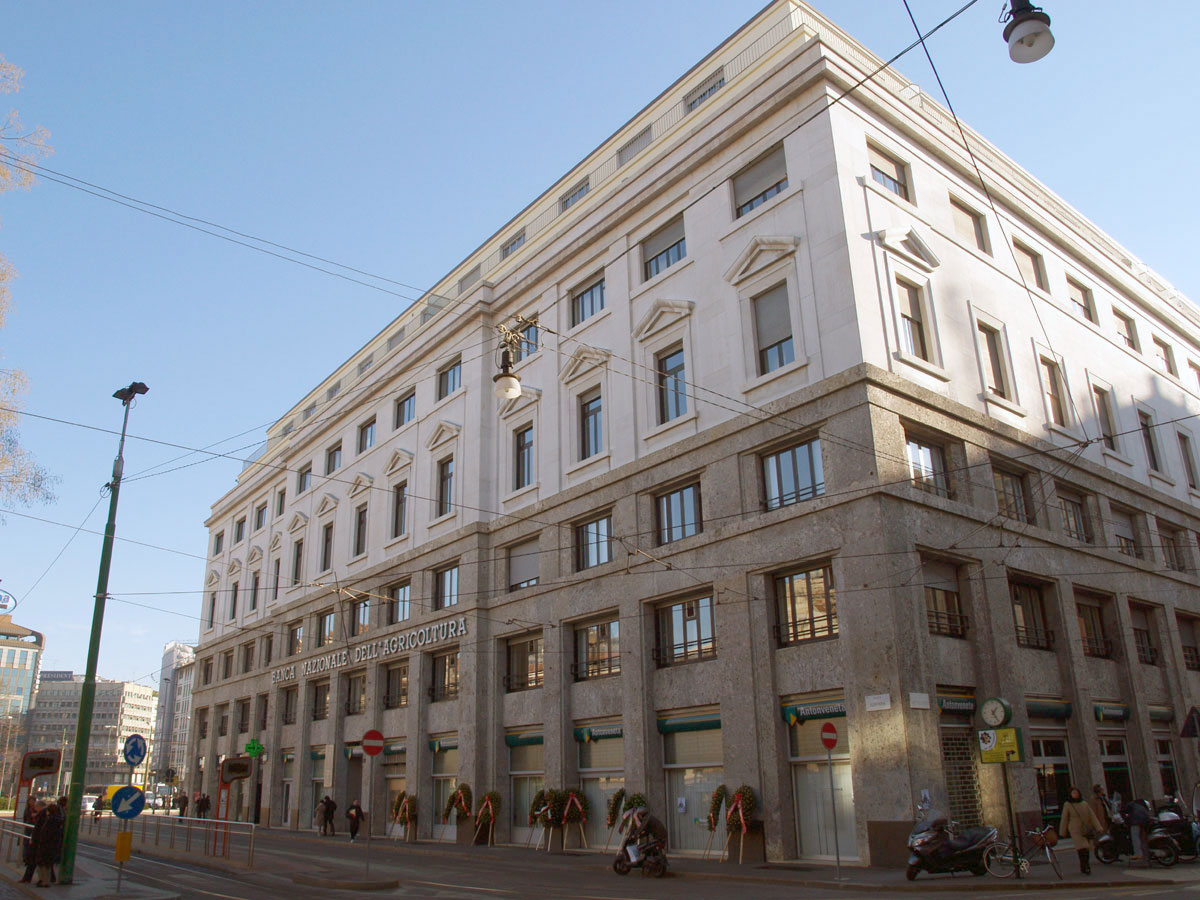
The building in 2007

== Piazza Fontana ==
On 25 April 1969, a bomb exploded at the Fiat booth at a Milan trade fair, in which five people were injured. There was also a bomb discovered at the city's central station. The explosion at Piazza Fontana was not the first, but part of a well-coordinated series of attacks.

=== Deceased victims ===
1. Giovanni Arnoldi (42 years old)
2. Giulio China (57)
3. Eugenio Corsini (71)
4. Pietro Dendena (45)
5. Carlo Gaiani (56)
6. Calogero Galatioto (71)
7. Carlo Garavaglia (67)
8. Paolo Gerli (77)
9. Luigi Meloni (57)
10. Vittorio Mocchi (33)
11. Gerolamo Papetti (79)
12. Mario Pasi (50)
13. Carlo Perego (74)
14. Oreste Sangalli (49)
15. Angelo Scaglia (61)
16. Carlo Silva (71)
17. Attilio Valè (52)

=== Deaths of Pinelli and Calabresi ===
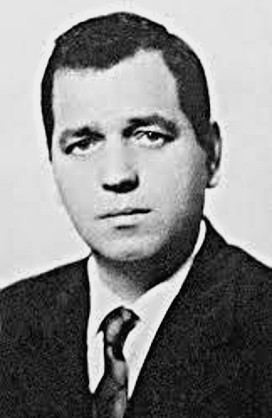
Giuseppe Pinelli

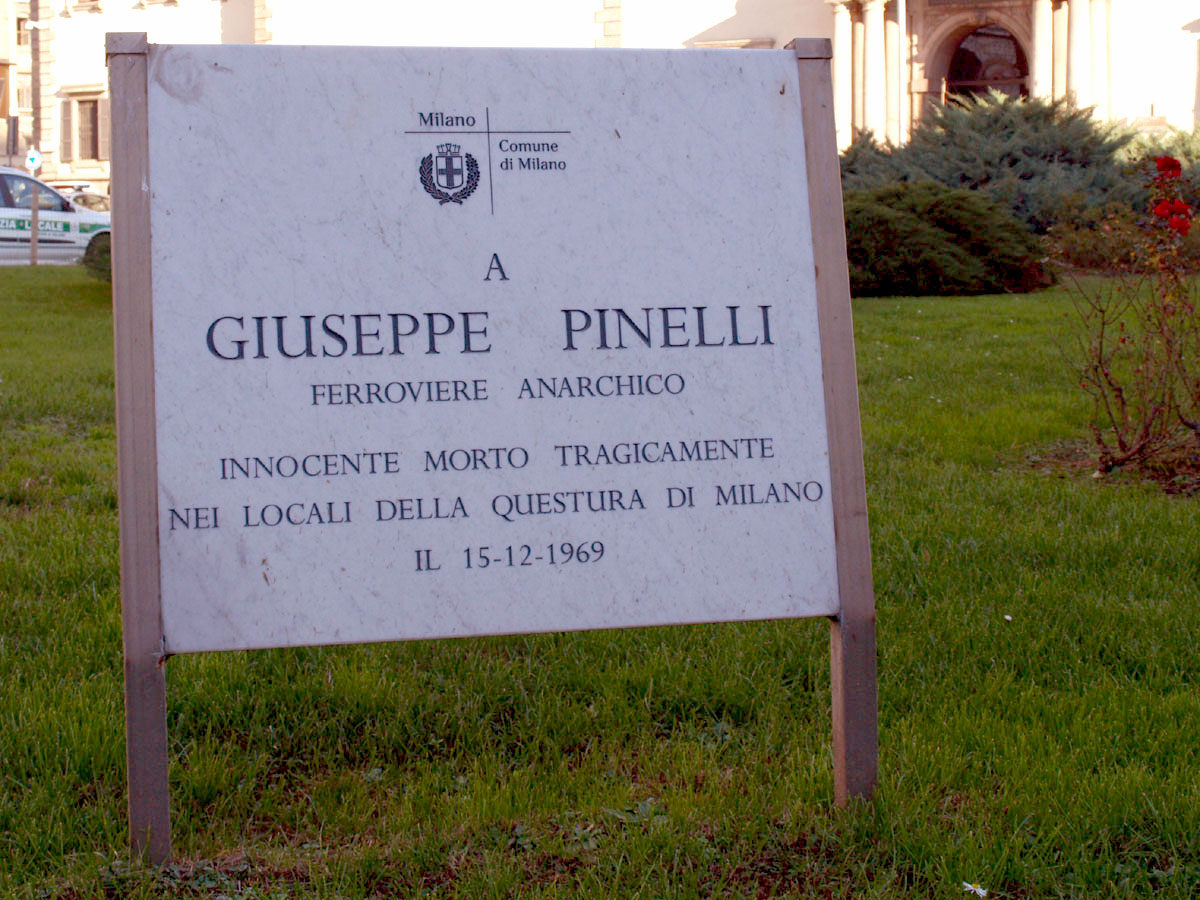
Plaque in memory of Giuseppe Pinelli

The Piazza Fontana bombing was initially attributed to Italian anarchists. After over 80 arrests were made, the suspect Giuseppe Pinelli, an anarchist railway worker, died after falling from the fourth-floor window of the police station where he was being held. Serious discrepancies existed in the police account, which initially maintained that Pinelli had committed suicide by leaping from the window during a routine interrogation session. Three police officers interrogating Pinelli, including Commissioner Luigi Calabresi, were put under investigation in 1971 for his death, but a later inquiry, which ended on 25 October 1975, concluded that there were no wrongdoings regarding Pinelli's death: public prosecutor Gerardo D'Ambrosio established that his fall had been caused by fainting and losing balance, tired after three days of intense questioning.

Despite Calabresi being exonerated (he was not in the room when Pinelli fell), the far-left organisation Lotta Continua held Calabresi responsible for the death of Pinelli, and in 1972 he was murdered by left-wing militants in revenge. Adriano Sofri and Giorgio Pietrostefani, former leaders of Lotta Continua, were convicted of plotting Calabresi's assassination, while members Ovidio Bompressi and Leonardo Marino were sentenced for carrying it out.

== Official investigations and trials ==
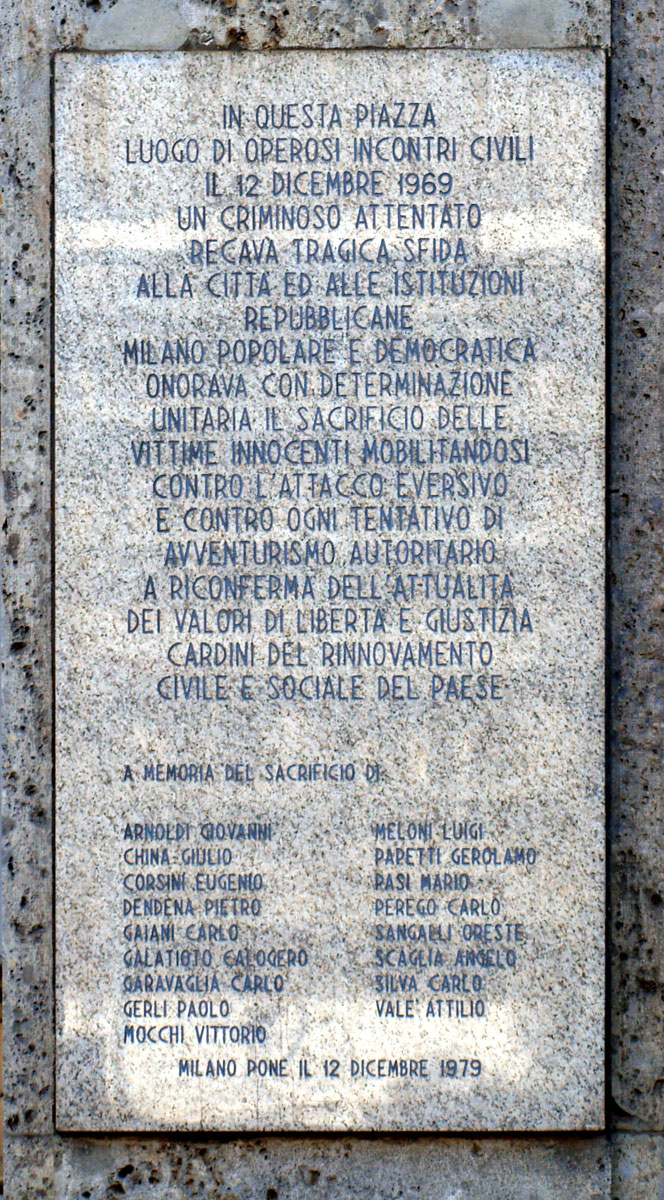
Plaque in memory of the 17 victims of the terrorist bombing in Piazza Fontana

Anarchist Pietro Valpreda was also arrested after a taxi driver, called Cornelio Rolandi, identified him as the suspicious-looking client he had taken to the bank that day. After his alibi was judged insufficient, he was held for three years in preventive detention before being sentenced for the crime. In 1987 he was acquitted by the Supreme Court of Cassation for lack of evidence.

The far-right neo-fascist organization Ordine Nuovo, founded by Pino Rauti, came under suspicion. On 3 March 1972 Franco Freda, Giovanni Ventura and Rauti were arrested and charged with planning the terrorist attacks of 25 April 1969 at the Trade Fair and Railway Station in Milan, and the 8 and 9 August 1969 bombings of several trains, followed by the Piazza Fontana bombing.

In 1987, after a number of trials, the Court of Cassation ruled that despite evidence linking Freda, Ventura, and others to the Piazza Fontana bombing, it could not be determined for certain who planned it, nor who carried it out. The Court confirmed the convictions of Freda and Ventura in relation to the bombs placed in Padua and Milan, for which they each received a sentence of 16 years.

Also in 1987, the milanese Guido Salvini reopened the investigation based on new evidence. Martino Siciliano, a member of Ordine Nuovo, decided to cooperate when presented with a taped telephone conversation between Delfo Zorzi and some associates which contained the observation that, "the Siciliano problem could be solved with a 9 calibre gun". Siciliano said that he had been present at a meeting with Zorzi and Carlo Maria Maggi in April 1969, in the Ezzelino bookstore in Padua owned by Giovanni Ventura, when Freda announced the program of the train bombings. Despite a death threat from Pino Rauti, electrician Tullio Fabris testified that he had supplied Freda with primers and timers.

Carlo Digilio, confessed explosives expert and advisor to the Ordine Nuovo in the Veneto was convicted in June 2001, which was subsequently upheld on appeal in March 2004. Digilio displayed instances of memory loss after suffering a stroke in 1995. His subsequent confusion regarding dates and events led to the Court declaring him an unreliable witness.

In a 2004 trial of neo-fascists, the Milan Court of Appeal attributed the Piazza Fontana bombing to Freda and Ventura. However, since they had been acquitted in 1987 they could not be retried.

In 1998, Milan judge Guido Salvini indicted U.S. Navy officer David Carrett on charges of political and military espionage for his participation in the Piazza Fontana bombing. Salvini also opened up a case against Sergio Minetto, an Italian official of the U.S.-NATO intelligence network, and "collaboratore di giustizia" Carlo Digilio (Uncle Otto), who served as the CIA coordinator in Northeastern Italy in the sixties and seventies. The newspaper la Repubblica reported that Carlo Rocchi, CIA's man in Milan, was discovered in 1995 searching for information concerning Operation Gladio. The inquiry was also conducted by the Venetian judge Felice Casson who charged the then director of SISMI, Sergio Siracusa, of having paid a sum to the justice collaborator Martino Siciliano, but Siracusa refused to testify. The sum ranged between 50 and 100 millions of the then Italian lira. Salvini charged Casson of violation of the preliminary secret, but the judges of Trieste and Brescia rejected his accusations.

== State security service ==
General Gianadelio Maletti, the head of SID (Servizio Informazioni Difesa), and a member of the secret masonic society P2 was found responsible for obstructing the investigation and withholding information during the first trial in Catanzaro. In an effort to protect extreme right-wing groups, Maletti destroyed a report concerning the Padua cell of Ordine Nuovo and arranged for potential witnesses to leave the country. Maletti subsequently emigrated to South Africa.

Captain Antonio Labruna, of SID, was also implicated in aiding and abetting the departure of witnesses Marco Pozzan and Giannettini Guido. Maletti and Labruna were convicted in January 1987.

Several elements brought the investigators to the theory that members of extreme right-wing groups were responsible for the bombings:

- The composition of the bombs used in Piazza Fontana was identical to that of the explosives that Ventura hid in a friend's home a few days after the attacks.
- The bags where the bombs were hidden had been bought a couple of days before the attacks in a shop in Padua, the city where Freda lived.

== Main stages of the trial ==
=== First trial ===
Main stages of the trial:

- Rome, 23 February 1972, the trial started. Main defendants: Pietro Valpreda and Mario Merlino. Ten days later, the process was moved to Milan for lack of territorial jurisdiction. Then it was transferred to Catanzaro for reasons of public order.
- Catanzaro, 18 March 1974, second trial. It was suspended after 30 days due to the inclusion of new defendants: Franco Freda and Giovanni Ventura.
- 27 January 1975, third trial. Co-defendants: anarchists and neo-fascists. After a year, new suspension: Defendant: Guido Giannettini (Italian secret agent).
- 18 January 1977, fourth trial. Defendants: anarchists, neo-fascists and SID.
- 23 February 1979, judgment: life imprisonment for Freda, Ventura and Giannettini. Acquitted: Valpreda and Merlino. Freda and Ventura were also sentenced in relation to the bombs placed in Padua and Milan from April to August 1969, while Valpreda and Merlino were sentenced to 4 ½ years for conspiracy.
- Catanzaro, 22 May 1980, starts the appeal process.
- 20 March 1981, judgment of appeal: all defendants were acquitted. The Appeal Court confirmed the sentence for Freda and Ventura (15 years of jail) in relation to the bombs placed in Padua and Milan, and confirmed the sentences to Valpreda and Merlino for conspiracy. The Prosecutor had asked for all the defendants to life in prison.
- 10 June 1982: the Supreme Court cancelled the judgment, acquitted Giannettini and ordered a new trial.
- Bari, 13 December 1984, new appeal trial. Defendants: Pietro Valpreda, Mario Merlino, Franco Freda and Giovanni Ventura.
- 1 August 1985, new judgment: all defendants were acquitted for lack of evidence. The Prosecutor had asked life imprisonment to Freda and Ventura, full acquittal to Valpreda, and acquittal for lack of evidence to Merlino.
- 27 January 1987: the Supreme Court confirmed the sentence.

The supreme Court of Cassation sentenced two members of the Italian secret services – General Gian Adelio Maletti (1 year of jail) and Captain Antonio Labruna (10 months) – to having misled the investigation and acquitted Marshal Gaetano Tanzilli, accused of perjury.

=== Second trial ===
- Catanzaro, 26 October 1987, new trial. Neo-fascists defendants: Massimiliano Fachini and Stefano Delle Chiaie.
- 20 February 1989, judgment: the defendants were acquitted for not having committed the crime. The Prosecutor had asked life imprisonment to Delle Chiaie and acquittal for lack of evidence to Fachini.
- 5 July 1991: the Appeal Court in Catanzaro confirmed the acquittal of Stefano Delle Chiaie.

=== Third trial ===
- Milan, 24 February 2000, new trial. Neo-fascists defendants: Delfo Zorzi, Carlo Maria Maggi (a physician), Carlo Digilio and Giancarlo Rognoni.
- 30 June 2001, judgment: life imprisonment for Delfo Zorzi, Carlo Maria Maggi and Giancarlo Rognoni. Carlo Digilio received immunity from prosecution in exchange for his information.
- Milan, 16 October 2003, starts the appeal trial.
- 12 March 2004, judgment of appeal: Zorzi and Maggi were acquitted for lack of evidence, Rognoni were acquitted for not having committed the crime.
- 3 May 2005: the Supreme Court confirmed the sentence.

Stefano Tringali, accused of abetting, benefited from the prescription after being sentenced to one year in prison in the appeal trial.
The Supreme Court rejected as «false» Digilio's «alleged affiliation with US services». The Court found that in 1969 the Venetian group of Zorzi and Maggi organized the attacks, but it is not proven their participation in the massacre of 12 December. The Court certified that Martino Siciliano (another Ordine Nuovo's pentito) attended the assembly with Zorzi and Maggi in April 1969, in the library Ezzelino of Padua, where Freda announced the program of the train bombings. But since those bombs didn't kill anybody, it was not evidence of the involvement of Zorzi and Maggi in the next subversive strategy of Freda and Ventura, nor in the other acts of terrorism. The tragic events of 12 December 1969 didn't represent a loose cannon, but were the result of a subversive operation enrolled in a program well settled.

== Political theories of responsibility for the bombing ==
The bombing was the work of the right-wing group Ordine Nuovo ("New Order"), whose aim was to prevent the country from falling into the hands of the left wing by duping the public into believing the bombings were part of a communist insurgency.

A 2000 parliamentary report published by the Olive Tree coalition read that "U.S. intelligence agents were informed in advance about several right-wing terrorist bombings, including the December 1969 Piazza Fontana bombing in Milan and the Piazza della Loggia bombing in Brescia five years later, but did nothing to alert the Italian authorities or to prevent the attacks from taking place." It also alleged that Pino Rauti (at that time the leader of the MSI Fiamma-Tricolore party), a journalist and founder of the far-right New Order organization, received regular funding from a press officer at the U.S. embassy in Rome. "So even before the 'stabilising' plans that Atlantic circles had prepared for Italy became operational through the bombings, one of the leading members of the subversive right was literally in the pay of the American embassy in Rome", the report says. Paolo Emilio Taviani, the Christian Democrat co-founder of Gladio (NATO's stay-behind anti-Communist organization in Italy), told investigators that the SID military intelligence service was about to send a senior officer from Rome to Milan to prevent the bombing, but decided to send a different officer from Padua in order to put the blame on left-wing anarchists.

In an August 2000 interview with Il Secolo XIX newspaper Taviani said that he did not believe the US Central Intelligence Agency (CIA) was involved in organising the Milan bomb. However, he alleged, "It seems to me certain, however, that agents of the CIA were among those who supplied the materials and who muddied the waters of the investigation."

According to the Swiss writer Daniele Ganser (described by some as a conspiracy theorist) and British journalist Philip Willan, the bombing was the work of a network of far-right militants, as part of a terrorist campaign known as a strategy of tension, with the aim of blaming the crime on communist cells, discrediting the political left, and be a catalyst to move away from democratic institutions. One member Vincenzo Vinciguerra of the right-wing conspiracy involved in the series of Strategy of tension terrorist bombings explained "The December 1969 explosion was supposed to be the detonator which would have convinced the political and military authorities to declare a state of emergency."

== See also ==
- 12 dicembre (documentary film by Giovanni Bonfanti and Pier Paolo Pasolini)
- Accidental Death of an Anarchist (a satirical play by Dario Fo about the bombings)
- La notte della Repubblica (TV programme)
- Piazza Fontana: The Italian Conspiracy
- "Commissione Stragi"
- Operation Gladio
