= Pietro Valpreda =

Italian anarchist (1932–2002)

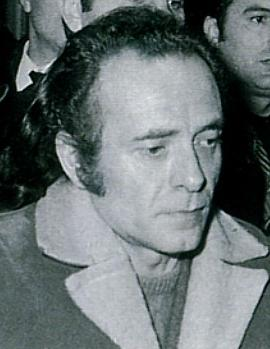
Valpreda in 1969

Pietro Valpreda (29 September 1932 – 6 July 2002) was an Italian anarchist, poet, dancer, and novelist. He was sentenced to prison on charges of being responsible for the Piazza Fontana bombing in December 1969. In 1987, he was acquitted by Italy's Supreme Court of Cassation for lack of evidence.

== Early life, education, and activism ==
Valpreda came from a poor working-class family in Milan. After the end of his formal education, he attended dance school. He made his living as a minor dancer on stage. In 1969, he moved to Rome, where he frequented the Bakunin Circle, before founding with several friends the 22 March Circle.

== Piazza Fontana bombing and miscarriage of justice ==
Following the bombing in Piazza Fontana, carried out on 12 December 1969 in the middle of the Hot Autumn, Valpreda was arrested by the police. A taxi driver testified to having seen him on Piazza Fontana a short time before the bombing, which left 17 dead and 88 injured. His testimony was not considered reliable, even if made in good faith. Another anarchist, Giuseppe Pinelli, was also arrested for the bombing, and died after falling from a fourth-floor window a few days later while the police illegally detained him.

Valpreda's name was splashed across the media as "the monster of Piazza Fontana" and the "human beast"; the television reporter Bruno Vespa claimed that "the guilty man has been found". For three years, he languished in jail, awaiting trial. All over Italy, there were huge pro-Valpreda demonstrations and the trial was moved to the deep south in order to avoid any type of political interference. Valpreda published his prison diaries, entitled It Is Him, which were the words used by the alleged witness, taxi driver Cornelio Rolandi. The criminal trial started at Rome on 23 February 1972; the Italian judiciary took 15 years to exonerate Valpreda, who was acquitted for lack of evidence, and 29 years to find someone else guilty of the bombing; Carlo Maria Maggi, Giancarlo Rognoni, and Delfo Zorzi, who had been sentenced to life imprisonment, were acquitted by the Court of Appeal in 2004 and by the Supreme Court of Cassation in 2005. It was later claimed that the real culprits of the bombing were other neo-fascists and Ordine Nuovo members. As it later emerged, most probably Valpreda was mistaken for Antonio Sottosanti, a far-right extremist close to the neo-fascist scene who was a lookalike of the anarchist. After his release, Valpreda continued to work as a dancer and opened a bar in Milan. He wrote four books with Piero Colaprico.

== See also ==
- Anarchism in Italy
- Andrea Salsedo
- Giuseppe Pinelli
- List of miscarriage of justice cases
- Strategy of tension
- Years of Lead
