= Delfo Zorzi =

Italian-born Japanese neo-fascist

Delfo Zorzi (born 3 July 1947), presently known as Roi Hagen (波元路伊), is an Italian-born Japanese neo-fascist.

== Biography ==
Roi Zorzi was born in Arzignano, near Vicenza, Italy, on July 3, 1947. In 1968 he moved to Naples to study Asian languages, later graduating with a PhD. In 1974 he moved to Japan and in 1989 he took Japanese citizenship with his present name, Roi Hagen.

In September 2005 an article by the magazine L'Espresso accused Zorzi of dealing furs in Italy via a series of firms under an assumed alias. In 2014, the supreme Court of Cassation also acquitted Zorzi from the accusation.

Zorzi is the financial director behind several fashion stores (i.e luxury bags, furs, leather) in Europe, including some in Sweden. In October 2021, his name was mentioned in the Pandora Papers. Accused of tax evasion to the tune of 75 million euros to the tax authorities, he had bought a luxury home using the services of a shell company.
