= Banca Nazionale dell'Agricoltura =

Italian bank (1921 to 2000)

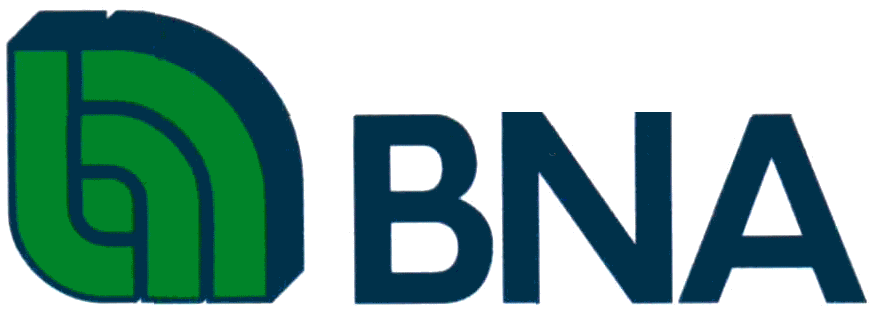
- Company type: S.p.A.
- Industry: Finance
- Founded: 1921
- Defunct: 2000
- Headquarters: Rome, Italy
- Products: Financial services

The Banca Nazionale dell'Agricoltura or BNA, was an Italian bank that existed from 1921 to 2000.

== History ==
Banca Nazionale dell'Agricoltura was established in Milan in 1921 by Count Giovanni Armenise (who after his death was succeeded by his nephew Giovanni Auletta Armenise, president of the bank until 1995); in 1938 its headquarters were moved to Rome and it was authorised to operate in the field of agrarian credit for both operating and improvement purposes.

The Banca Nazionale dell'Agricoltura is linked to the Piazza Fontana bombing, a terrorist attack that took place in a branch of the bank in the centre of Milan: a bomb exploded there on 12 December 1969 at 16:37, killing seventeen people (fourteen immediately) and wounding eighty-eight others.

In 2000, the bank was merged into Banca Antoniana Popolare Veneta, later Banca Antonveneta, which in turn initially merged into ABN AMRO, before then merging into the Banca Monte dei Paschi di Siena.

== See also ==
- List of banks in Italy
