= Piermarini Fountain =

Fountain in Milan, Italy

- Fontana del Piermarini (Italian)
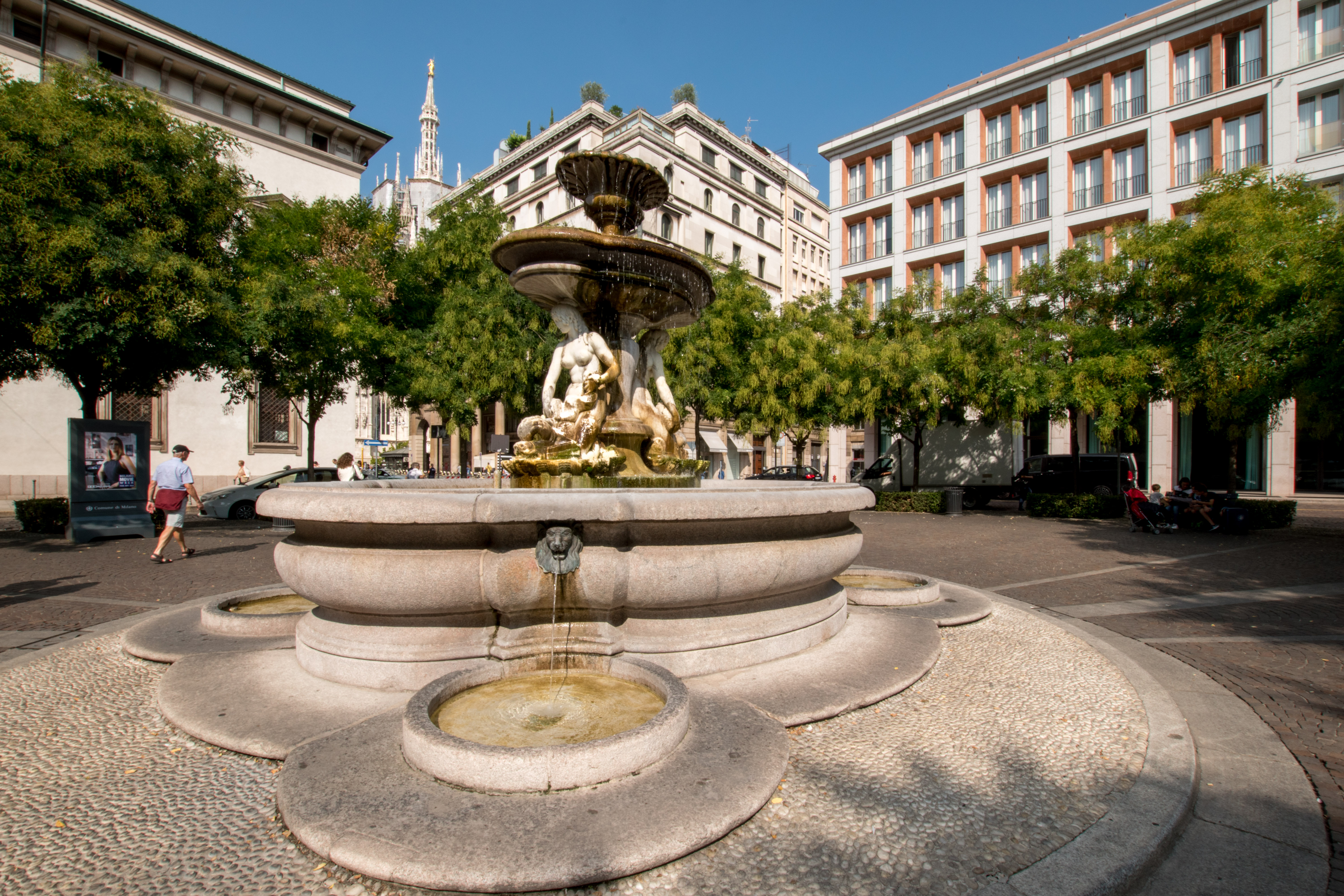
- Artist: Giuseppe Piermarini
- Year: 1782
- Location: Milan; 45.4635°N 9.1938°E

The Piermarini Fountain (Italian: Fontana del Piermarini) is a fountain located in Milan, Italy.

== History ==
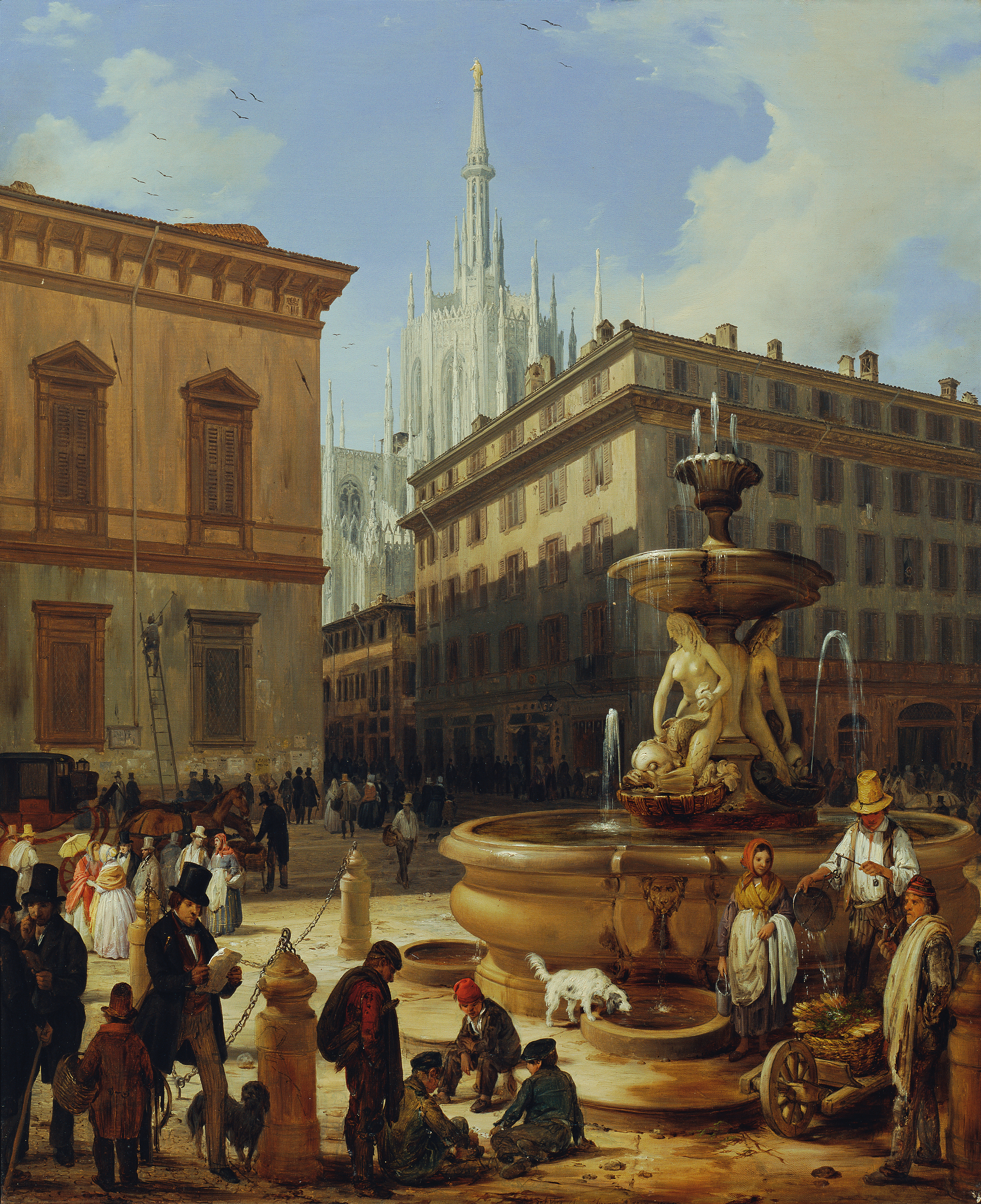
The Piermarini Fountain depicted in an 1844 painting by Angelo Inganni

The fountain, commissioned by Carlo Giuseppe di Firmian, plenipotentiary of Maria Theresa of Austria, and designed by architect Giuseppe Piermarini as part of the redevelopment of the area, was inaugurated on 15 August 1782, despite being incomplete. The two marble sirens, sculpted by Giuseppe Franchi and popularly known as the Teodolindes, were added the following year. The long time required to build the fountain was also due to technical difficulties in bringing water from the Seveso river, as the insufficient slope made a direct flow unfeasible. Piermarini addressed the issue by lowering the fountain below the level of the square and installing a pump near Via delle Ore. It is regarded as Milan's first fountain.

== Description ==
Located at the centre of Piazza Fontana, the fountain is made of pink Baveno granite and consists of three superimposed basins of progressively smaller size. Water flows from the uppermost basin into the middle one, which rests on a sculptural group featuring two dragon-like creatures carrying the sirens. It then descends into the larger lower basin and finally emerges through four spouts into four corresponding small basins at ground level.

== See also ==
- Piazza Fontana bombing
