= Strategy of tension =

Political policy encouraging violent struggle

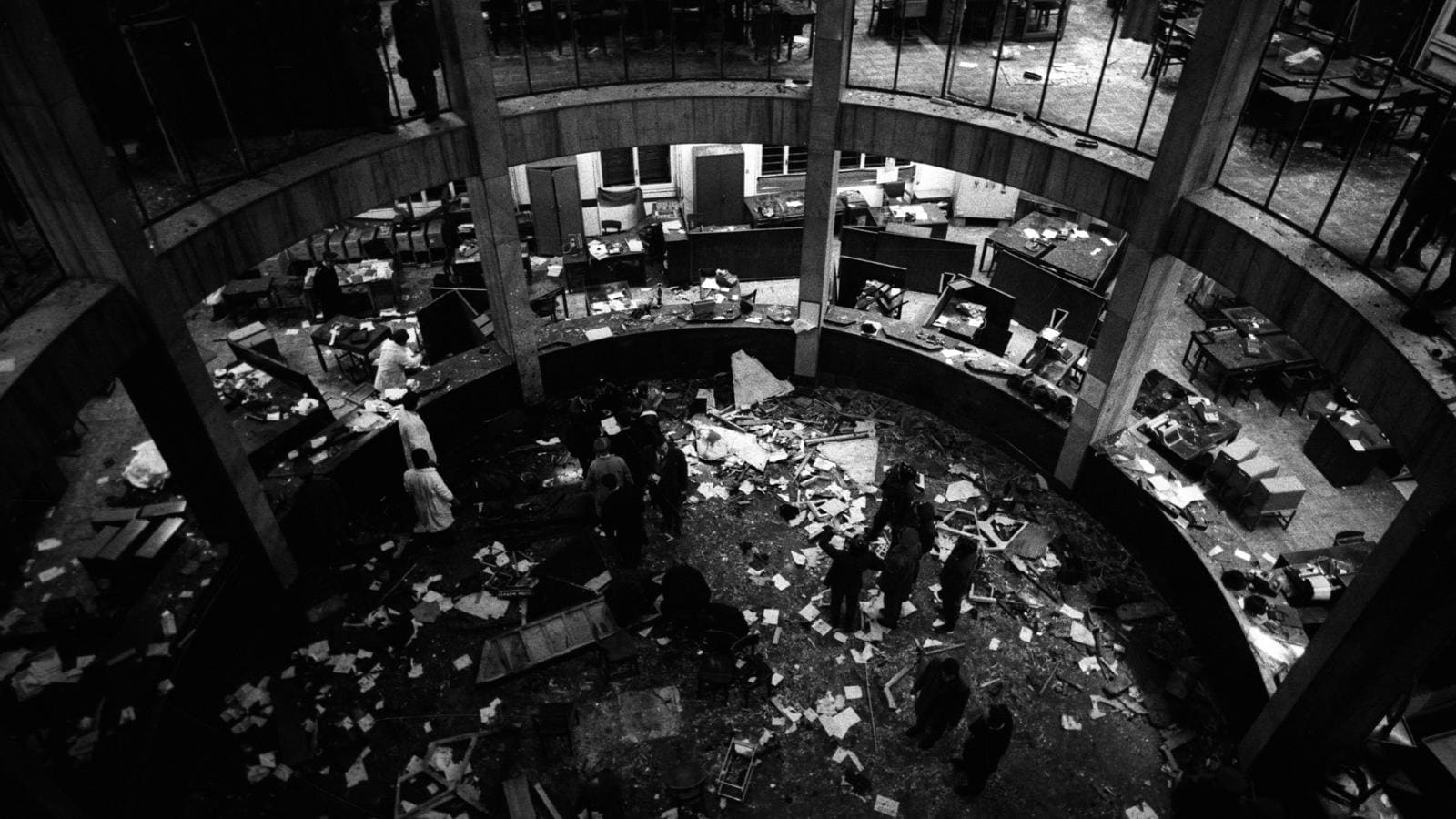
The interior of the Banca Nazionale dell'Agricoltura in Piazza Fontana, Milan, after it was bombed in 1969

A strategy of tension (Italian: strategia della tensione) is a political policy where violent struggle is encouraged rather than suppressed. The purpose is to create a general feeling of insecurity in the population and make people seek security in a strong government.

The strategy of tension is most closely identified with the Years of Lead in Italy from 1968 to 1982, in which extra-parliamentary far-left Marxist groups, far-right neo-fascist groups, and state intelligence agencies performed bombings, kidnappings, arsons, and murders. Some historians and activists have accused NATO of allowing and sanctioning such terrorism through projects like Operation Gladio, although this is disputed by other historians and denied by the intelligence agencies involved. Other cases where writers have alleged a strategy of tension include the deep state in Turkey from the 1970s–1990s, the war veterans and ZANU–PF in Zimbabwe that coordinated the farm invasions of 2000, the DRS security agency in Algeria from 1991 to 1999, the Belgian State Security Service during the Belgian terrorist crisis of 1982–1986, and violence instigated by paramilitary forces such as the Immigration and Customs Enforcement under the Trump administration in the United States.

According to the sociologist Franco Ferraresi, the term "strategy of tension" was first used in an article on the Piazza Fontana bombing in The Observer newspaper, published on 14 December 1969. Neal Ascherson, one of those responsible for that article, later clarified that the expression had been suggested to him by the journalists Antonio Gambino and Claudio Risé, both of L'Espresso, who had been in conversation with him in the days immediately following the explosion of the Piazza Fontana bomb.

== Alleged examples ==
=== United Kingdom ===
During the sectarian 40-year-long conflict in Northern Ireland known as The Troubles, there were allegations of significant state collusion between paramilitaries and the UK government.

=== Italy ===
From 1968 to 1982, Italy suffered numerous terrorist attacks by both the left and the right, which were often followed by government round-ups and mass arrests. Allegations, especially made by adherents of the Italian Communist Party (PCI), are that the government trumped up and intentionally allowed the attacks of communist radicals, or even carried out false flag operations in their name, as an excuse to arrest other communists, and allowed the attacks of far-right paramilitary organizations as an extrajudicial way to silence enemies.

Various parliamentary committees were held to investigate and prosecute these crimes in the 1990s. A 1995 report from the Democratic Party of the Left (PDS), the heir of the PCI, to a subcommittee of the Italian Parliament stated that a "strategy of tension" had been supported by the United States to "stop the PCI, and to a certain degree also the PSI, from reaching executive power in the country". Aldo Giannuli, a historian who worked as a consultant to the parliamentary terrorism commission, wrote that he considered the PDS' report as dictated primarily by domestic political considerations rather than historical ones, stating: "Since they have been in power the Left Democrats have given us very little help in gaining access to security service archives. This is a falsely courageous report." Giannuli decried the fact that many more leftist terrorists were prosecuted and convicted than rightist terrorists.

Swiss academic Daniele Ganser wrote NATO's Secret Armies, a 2004 book that alleged direct NATO support for far-right terrorists in Italy as part of its "strategy of tension". Ganser also alleges that Operation Gladio, an effort to organize stay-behind guerrillas and resistance in the event of a communist takeover of Italy by the Eastern Bloc, continued into the 1970s and supplied the far-right neo-fascist movements with weapons. Ganser's conclusions have been disputed; most notably, Ganser heavily cites the document US Army Field Manual 30-31B, which the US state department claims is a 1976 Soviet hoax meant to discredit the US, whilst others such as Ray S. Cline have claimed it is likely authentic and Licio Gelli who claimed it was in fact given to him by the CIA. In a 1992 BBC documentary on Gladio titled Operation GLADIO, the neo-fascist terrorist Vincenzo Vinciguerra reported that the stay-behind armies really did possess this strategy, stating that the state needed those terrorist attacks for the population to willingly turn to the state and ask for security.

== See also ==
- Accelerationism
- Agent provocateur
- Culture of fear
- Extremism
- Radicalization
- Terrorism
