= Autonomist Marxism =

School of Marxist thought

Autonomist Marxism is a school of Marxist thought and branch of the autonomist movement that emphasizes the ability of the working class to force changes in the capitalist system and bring about a post-capitalist society through its autonomous activity. This perspective sees class struggle, rather than objective economic laws, as the primary driving force of history. Key concepts within autonomist Marxism include the refusal of work, class composition, the social factory, and self-valorization.

The approach is distinguished from other forms of Marxism by its focus on working-class self-activity as the foundation for both resisting capital and creating new social relations. It emerged in the mid-20th century through the work of groups in the United States (the Johnson–Forest Tendency), France (Socialisme ou Barbarie), and most notably, Italy (operaismo). Autonomists argue for a "political reading" of Karl Marx's works, particularly Capital, treating it not as a work of economic theory but as a strategic weapon for understanding and advancing the class struggle from the perspective of the working class. The framework also expands the definition of the "working class" beyond the waged industrial proletariat to include unwaged workers—such as housewives, students, and peasants—whose labor is considered essential for the reproduction of capital.

Contemporary autonomist thought can be broadly divided into several tendencies. One, associated with Italian post-operaismo figures like Antonio Negri and Paolo Virno, focuses on the affirmative and constitutive power of the "multitude". A second, represented by the American Midnight Notes Collective, emphasizes the ongoing struggle over the "commons". A third, developed by John Holloway, proposes a "negative" autonomism centered on the refusal of and struggle against capitalist social forms.

== Etymology and definition ==
The term "autonomist Marxism" was coined by Harry Cleaver in the 1990s to group together diverse Marxist writers and militants whose work shared a recurring emphasis on the "power of workers to act autonomously". This tradition, according to Cleaver, includes not only self-identified Marxists but also figures from council communism and anarcho-communism who shared a focus on working-class self-activity, even if they rejected the "Marxist" label. The core of autonomist Marxism is a "political reading" of Karl Marx and of class society, which Cleaver defines as a strategic analysis conducted from the perspective of the working class with the aim of clarifying its own power and strategy.

This approach serves as an alternative to both traditional "political economy" readings of Marx, which are criticized for focusing one-sidedly on the "laws of motion" of capital while treating workers as victims, and "philosophical" readings, which are seen as exercises in ideological critique detached from the practical needs of struggle. For autonomists, revolutionary strategy develops directly from the ongoing growth of working-class struggle, not from abstract theory or the leadership of a vanguard party. The primary point of departure is the self-activity of the working class, which is understood as "more than a victimized cog in the machinery of capital".

== Historical antecedents and influences ==
Autonomist Marxism synthesizes several "threads" of Marxist thought that, beginning in the 1940s, sought to overcome the economic determinism and one-sided focus on capital's power that characterized orthodox Marxism. These currents developed in different national contexts but shared a common focus on the independent power of the working class.

=== Johnson–Forest Tendency and Socialisme ou Barbarie ===
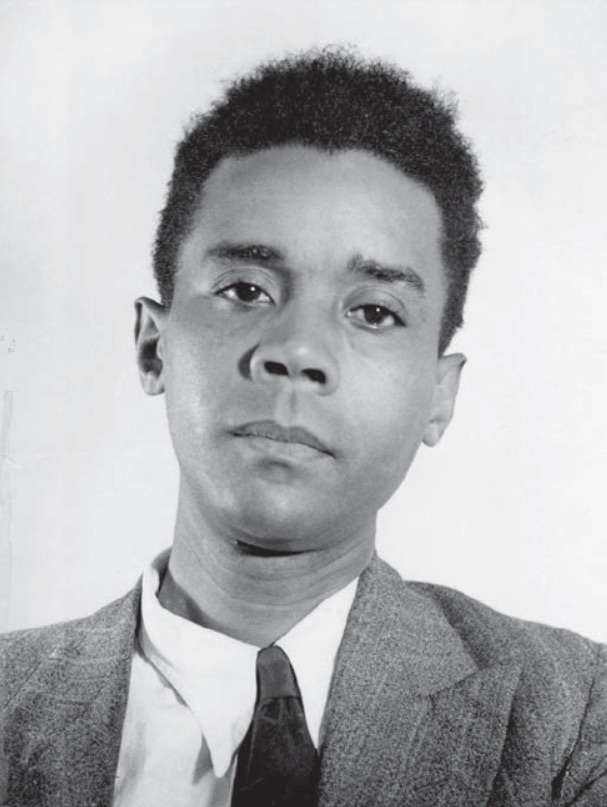
C. L. R. James

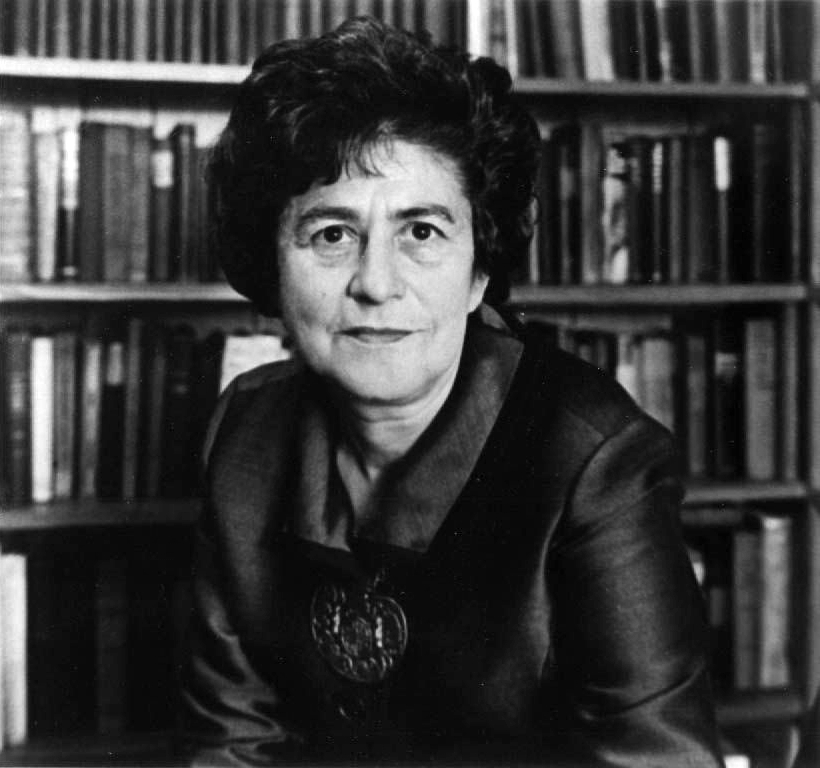
Raya Dunayevskaya

One of the earliest antecedents was the Johnson–Forest Tendency, a faction within the American Trotskyist movement in the 1940s led by C. L. R. James and Raya Dunayevskaya. Disillusioned with the orthodox Trotskyist analysis of the Soviet Union as a "degenerate workers' state", they developed a theory of state capitalism, arguing that the USSR was a variation of the same phase of capitalist development occurring in the West. Their analysis was grounded in the study of production relations, identifying the introduction of Taylorism and Fordism in both the US and the USSR as new forms of domination.

Crucially, unlike the Frankfurt School, which saw only domination in these new technologies, the Johnson–Forest Tendency emphasized the power of workers to oppose them. They documented the autonomous struggles of rank-and-file workers against both management and union bureaucracies, particularly in the Detroit auto industry. James also argued that the independent struggles of Black workers constituted a vanguard of the American working class. This led to a "total repudiation of the theory and practice of the Leninist theory of the Vanguard Party", in favor of recognizing that new organizational forms arise spontaneously from workers' own experiences.

In France, a parallel development occurred with the formation of the Socialisme ou Barbarie group (1949–1965), led by Cornelius Castoriadis and Claude Lefort. They broke with Trotskyism for similar reasons as Johnson–Forest, with whom they were in direct contact. They also developed a critique of Soviet bureaucracy and focused on "workers' daily resistance in industry", translating and publishing accounts of American workers' struggles to inform their own analyses of the French context. These currents directly influenced the Italian workerists through figures like Danilo Montaldi, who translated and circulated their work, providing early Italian thinkers with analyses of autonomous workers' struggles inside modern factories.

=== Italian operaismo (workerism) ===
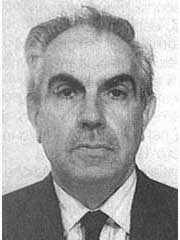
Mario Tronti

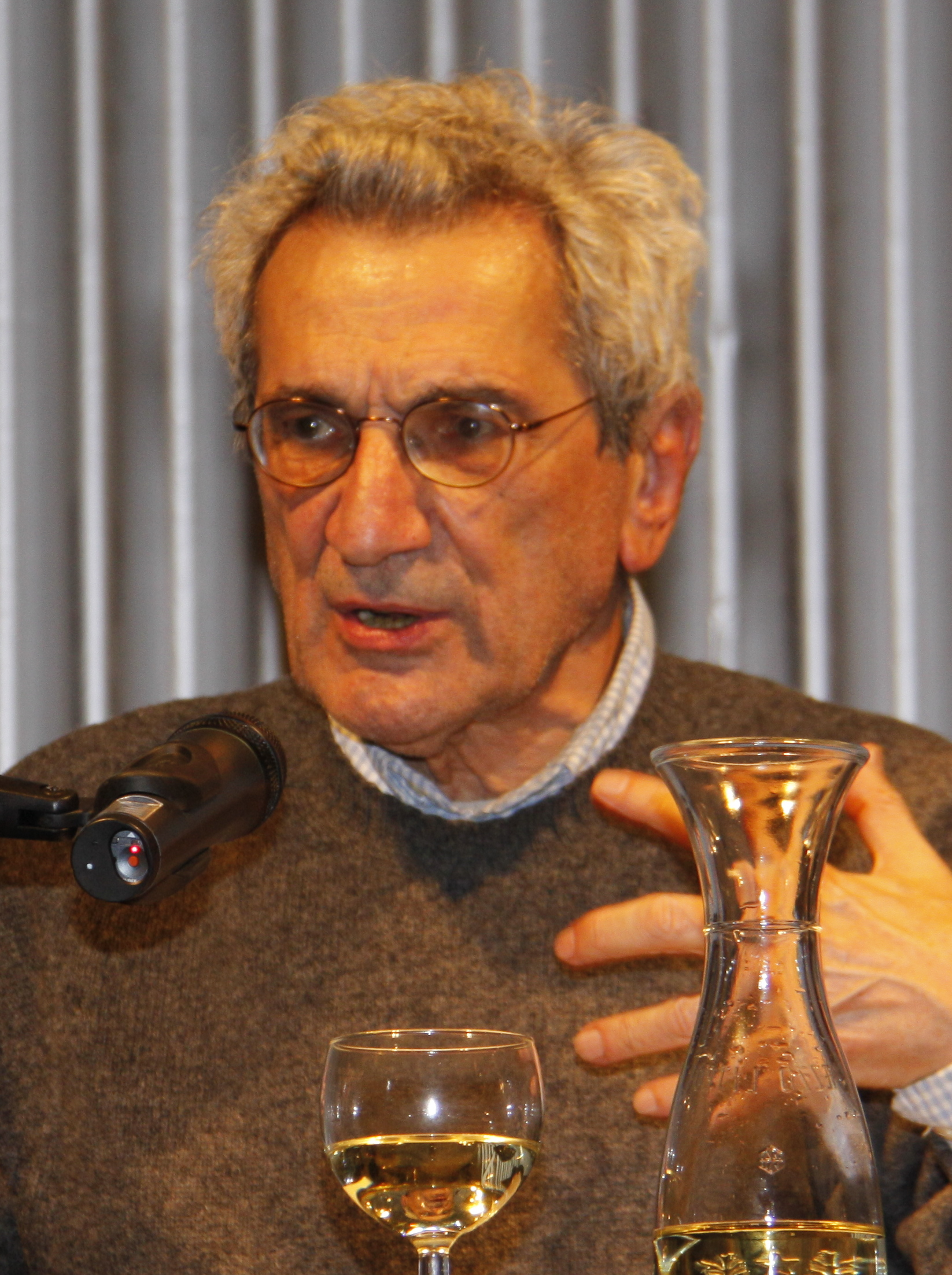
Antonio Negri

The most significant influence on autonomist Marxism came from the Italian "workerist" (operaismo) movement of the 1960s. This current emerged from the journals Quaderni Rossi and Classe Operaia primarily as a response to the perceived failures of the traditional Italian labor movement—particularly the Italian Communist Party (PCI) and Italian Socialist Party (PSI)—to analyze and respond to the new forms of class conflict developing in the factories of post-war Italy's "economic miracle". Theorists such as Raniero Panzieri, Mario Tronti, and Antonio Negri developed a powerful critique of orthodox Marxism and the PCI, grounded in the analysis of a new wave of autonomous factory struggles.

Panzieri, analyzing the rise of Fordism in Italy, argued that capitalist technological development and planning were a direct response to working-class struggle. Capital's plan for the division of labor was a political plan to divide and control the working class. This inverted the traditional Marxist view, which saw technology as a neutral productive force. Tronti built on this, arguing that working-class struggle is the primary motor of capitalist development. He formulated what became known as the "Copernican inversion" of Marxism, famously writing in the first issue of Classe Operaia: "We too have worked with a concept that puts capitalist development first, and workers second. This is a mistake. And now we have to turn the problem on its head... and start again from the beginning: and the beginning is the class struggle of the working class." From this viewpoint, capital is understood not as an independent force but as a reactive one within the class relation, forced to constantly reorganize itself in response to workers' autonomous power.

These insights informed two key areas of study: concrete "workers' inquiries" into contemporary class struggles, pioneered by Romano Alquati in Italian factories, and historical reassessments of working-class organization. Sergio Bologna, for example, analyzed the historical forms of workers' councils and industrial unions as products of specific class compositions, rather than as universally applicable models.

=== Feminist movements and the unwaged ===
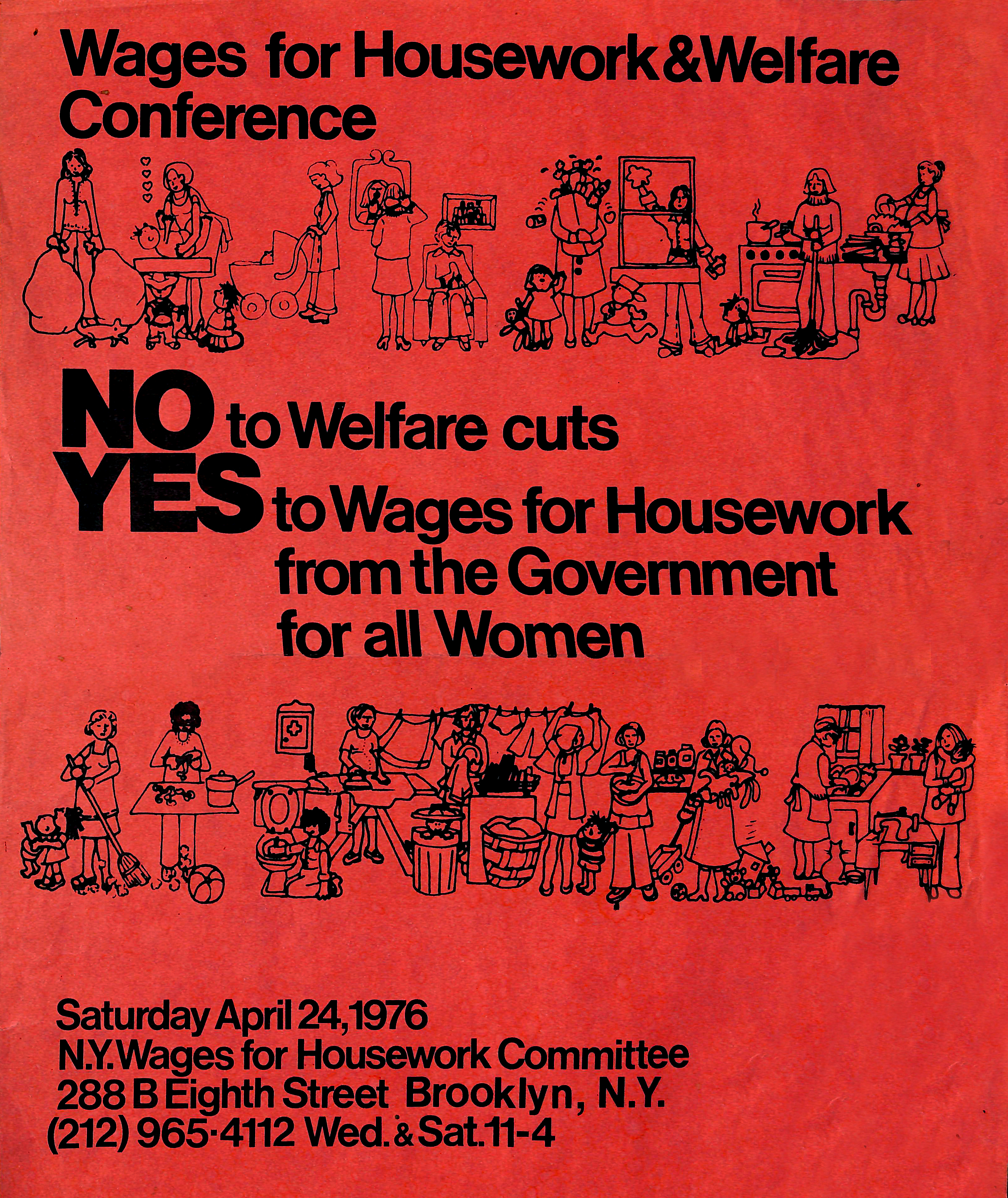
Poster of the New York Wages for Housework Committee, 1976

A decisive advance in autonomist thought came from the feminist movement, particularly the International Wages for Housework campaign launched in the 1970s by figures like Mariarosa Dalla Costa and Selma James. Expanding on Tronti's analysis of capitalist reproduction, they focused on the central role of women's unwaged domestic labor in producing and reproducing labor-power—the most essential commodity for capital. The theoretical work of groups like Italy's Lotta Femminista (Feminist Struggle) was central to this development. Thinkers such as Leopoldina Fortunati analyzed how the work of reproduction is posited as "natural" production under capitalism, appearing to be outside the creation of value while in fact producing the fundamental commodity of labor-power itself.

This analysis demonstrated how the wage relation divides the working class into waged and unwaged sectors (housewives, students, peasants), rendering the struggles of the unwaged invisible to traditional Marxism. The hierarchy between the waged and unwaged was identified as the fundamental basis for sexism and racism within capital, as these divisions are maintained through differentiated access to the wage. The demand for a wage for housework was thus a strategic one, aimed at making this unpaid labor visible, overcoming the primary division within the class, and providing the unwaged with the material resources (power) to struggle against it. This work broadened the definition of the working class and allowed for an understanding of the autonomous movements of women, students, and peasants as integral parts of an international cycle of struggle.

== Key concepts ==
=== Working-class autonomy and the refusal of work ===
The foundational principle of autonomist Marxism is that the working class is an autonomous political subject capable of acting in its own interests, independent of and often against its "official" organizations like trade unions and political parties. This autonomy is expressed in everyday struggles on the shop floor (sabotage, absenteeism) as well as in larger social upheavals like wildcat strikes and riots.

From this perspective, a key strategy of the working class is the "refusal of work". Under capitalism, which is defined as a social system based on the imposition of work, the struggle is not to "liberate" work from capital but to abolish it. This contrasts with traditional socialist views that seek to create a society of non-alienated labor. Autonomists argue that for the "mass worker"—deskilled under Fordism—work can only be a means of social control to be abolished. The struggle for less work and more income (or wealth) is seen as a direct attack on the foundations of capital.

=== Class composition, political recomposition, and decomposition ===
Autonomist Marxism uses a specific set of concepts to analyze the dynamic of class struggle.

- "Class composition" refers to the political structure of the working class, shaped by capital's division of labor but also by workers' own struggles. It is a measure of the power relations within the class. For the operaismo tradition, it was the "most distinctive category" of analysis. It was used to analyze the relationship between the "technical composition" of the working class—the specific material structure of the labor force as organized by capital's need for production—and its "political composition", the self-organized forms of struggle, behaviors, and solidarities that emerged from this material condition.
- "Political recomposition" is the process through which the working class overcomes capital's divisions (e.g., between waged and unwaged, or between different racial and gender groups) to achieve a higher level of unity and power. This process involves the circulation of struggles across different sectors of the class.
- "Decomposition" is capital's response to political recomposition. It is the strategy of imposing a new technical or social division of labor to break the power workers have achieved and restore control.

This framework presents a dynamic model of class struggle, in which capital is continually forced to restructure its command in response to the shifting composition and power of the working class.

=== Social factory and the expanded working class ===
A central concept developed by Italian autonomists is that of the "social factory", which posits that capital has extended its domination beyond the factory walls to encompass all of society. As Tronti wrote, "At the highest level of capitalist development, the social relation becomes a moment of the relation of production... the whole of society exists as a function of the factory and the factory extends its exclusive domination over the whole of society". From this perspective, activities that take place in the community—in the home, the school, and even during leisure time—are understood as work for capital, specifically the work of producing and reproducing labor-power. The family is a site for the reproduction of workers, schools train them, and the "cultural sphere" shapes their desires and habits.

This analysis leads to a redefinition of the working class to include not only waged factory workers but also the unwaged, whose labor is essential for capital accumulation. The struggles of housewives, students, and the unemployed are therefore seen not as peripheral but as central attacks on capital's command over the totality of social labor.

=== Self-valorization ===
While the "refusal of work" represents the negative side of working-class struggle (the attack on capital), "self-valorization" (autovalorizzazione) represents its positive, constructive side. Coined by Antonio Negri, the term refers to the autonomous elaboration of new ways of being, new social relationships, and alternative forms of life that go beyond simple resistance to capital. It designates "radically autonomous processes ... that not only constitute an alternative basis of potential development but also actually represent a new constituent foundation." It designates all forms of self-activity through which workers constitute themselves as subjects outside of and against their class status. To the degree that workers "autonomously valorize" their lives, they move beyond being "workers" and create new social worlds, however fleeting or durable. Cleaver links this concept to the self-organizing activities of the Zapatista rebellion in Chiapas, Mexico, which he sees as a contemporary example of communities seeking the power to build "diverse and autonomous new worlds" rather than simply resisting capitalist exploitation.

== Methodology ==
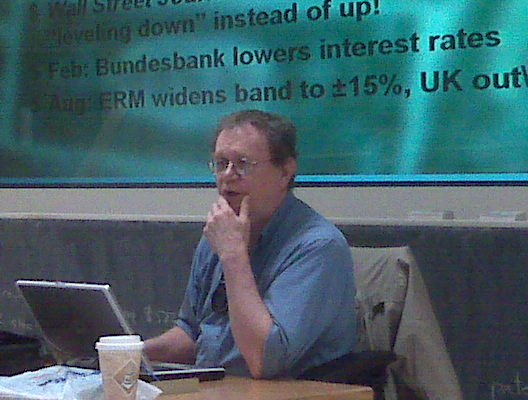
Harry Cleaver, an autonomist Marxist and author of Reading 'Capital' Politically (1979)

The core methodology of autonomist Marxism is a "political reading" of Marx's Capital. This approach rejects interpretations of Capital as a work of economics, philosophy, or history. Instead, it is read as an analysis of the class struggle from the point of view of the working class. The Italian workerists were influenced in this by the philosopher Galvano Della Volpe, whose "scientific" and anti-historicist reading of Marx provided a basis for confronting Capital directly, bypassing the dominant Gramscian traditions of the Italian Communist Party.

This reading insists that every category in Marx's work must be understood in terms of the class antagonism it represents. There is no "objective" or neutral perspective; every concept has two sides, reflecting the perspectives of capital and the working class. For example, the wage is a cost and a tool to hide exploitation for capital, but it is also income and a source of power for workers to struggle with. Technology is a means of increasing productivity and control for capital, but it is also a terrain of struggle and a product of workers' past successes in reducing the working day. This focus on the primacy of struggle leads some autonomists to de-emphasize or critique parts of Marx's analysis that they see as overly objectivist. Antonio Negri, for instance, expressed his impatience with Marx's analysis in the early chapters of Capital: "I always find Marx very annoying when he spins all these tales about the commodity form. Of course, they are all true tales! But in order to understand them, one needs to get them only later, that is after the analysis of class struggle."

The aim of a political reading is to "discover how his work can be of use to us" by translating the abstract categories of Capital into the concrete language of class struggles. This involves going "behind the fetishism" of economic categories to grasp the underlying social relations of power and struggle.

== Contemporary tendencies ==
Since the decline of the movements of the 1970s, autonomist thought has continued to develop along several different trajectories. Political scientist David Eden has proposed a division of contemporary autonomism into three main schools of thought: one focused on going beyond capitalism (led by Antonio Negri and Paolo Virno), another on building an outside (the Midnight Notes Collective), and a third on being against it (John Holloway).

=== Post-operaismo and the multitude ===
A prominent tendency within contemporary autonomism is associated with the post-operaismo theorists of Italy, notably Antonio Negri and Paolo Virno. Influenced by Marx's Grundrisse, the philosophy of Baruch Spinoza, and French post-structuralism (particularly the work of Michel Foucault, Gilles Deleuze, and Félix Guattari), this school of thought focuses on the "affirmative" and creative capacities of labor. They argue that the transition from a Fordist to a "post-Fordist" economy, driven by workers' revolts against the factory, has resulted in a new phase of capitalism characterized by "biopolitical production". In this phase, capital's command extends over all of social life, and production becomes increasingly "immaterial", relying on intellect, communication, and affect.

Instead of the industrial working class, Negri and Virno propose the "multitude" as the new revolutionary subject. The multitude is a network of singularities who cooperate and produce through shared linguistic and affective capacities, which they call "the common". Because this creative cooperation is immanent to the multitude itself, capital is relegated to a parasitic role of command and extraction. The political strategy that emerges from this analysis is one of "exodus"—a collective flight from and withdrawal of the multitude's creative power from capital's command, in order to construct an autonomous, democratic alternative.

=== The commons and the "new enclosures" ===
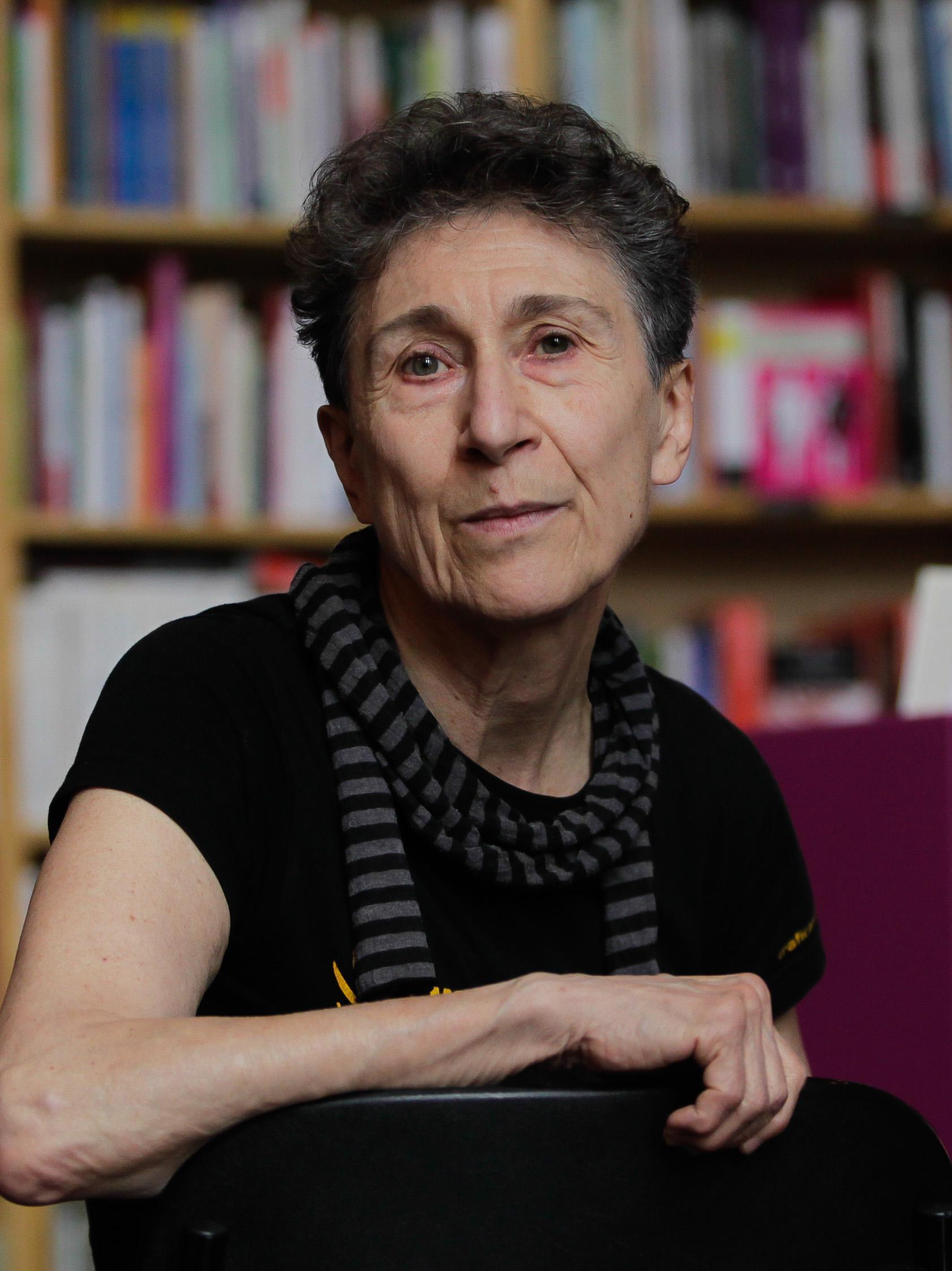
Silvia Federici

A second tendency is associated with the Midnight Notes Collective, an American group that includes theorists such as Silvia Federici, George Caffentzis, and Peter Linebaugh. This school of thought emphasizes the concepts of the "commons" and "enclosures" as central to understanding both capitalist accumulation and anti-capitalist struggle. They argue that "primitive accumulation" is not a historical stage that precedes capitalism but is an ongoing process of enclosure, through which capital dispossesses populations of their commons—shared resources, social relations, and forms of autonomous subsistence—to create a proletariat.

Drawing heavily on feminist analyses of reproductive labor, this perspective highlights the struggles of unwaged peoples, especially peasants and communities in the Global South, who rely on commons for their subsistence. Federici's work, particularly Caliban and the Witch (2004), reinterprets the rise of capitalism as a "counter-revolution" against the medieval proletariat, in which the witch hunts were a key mechanism for enclosing women's bodies and reproductive labor for the purpose of producing the workforce. From this viewpoint, communism is the creation and defense of an "outside" to capital, built on the autonomous power of communities to reclaim and create commons.

=== Negative autonomism and the "scream" ===
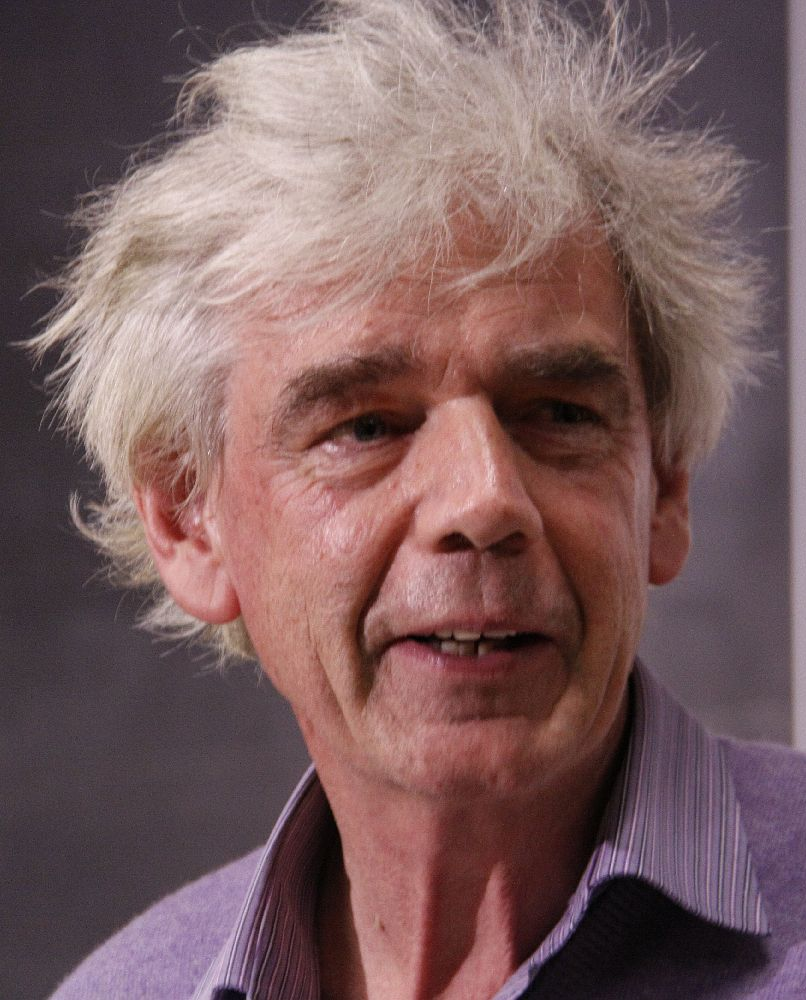
John Holloway

A third tendency, termed "negative autonomism" by its leading proponent John Holloway, develops a synthesis of autonomist Marxism and the critical theory of the Frankfurt School, especially Theodor Adorno. This approach is centered on a radical negation of all capitalist social forms. Holloway argues that the core of class struggle is not an affirmation of working-class identity but a negative "scream" of refusal against the experience of being classified and objectified by capital.

This perspective focuses on the critique of fetishism and identity. It sees capitalism as a process of "identification"—of fixing the fluid process of human creativity ("doing") into static objects and social roles ("being"). The struggle against capital is therefore a struggle of non-identity against identity, of "anti-power" (the power-to-do) against "power-over". Revolution is understood not as the seizure of state power—which is seen as just another fetishized form of social relations—but as an ongoing process of creating "cracks" in the texture of capitalist domination, moments of refusal where alternative social relations can emerge. This "interstitial" concept of revolution emphasizes creating a new world not in the future but in the here and now, in the fissures of capitalist society.

== See also ==
- Communization
