= Autonomism =

Left-wing political and social movement

Autonomism is a European far-left political movement that emerged in Italy in the 1970s. It can be divided into two forms depending on the period: Autonomist Marxism (1970s–1990s) and Autonomist anarchism (2000s–present). The movement is committed to anti-capitalist, anti-state, horizontal, and anti-authoritarian struggle.

Born from the anti-authoritarian Marxist reflections of the 20th century and following an increasingly close alignment with anarchism, it took shape within the Italian autonomia of the 1970s. This movement brought together various thinkers, such as Toni Negri, and a primarily working-class population critical of traditional Italian communist structures, such as the Italian Communist Party. This initial form, organized around Italian workers and seeking to promote protest-based communist forms of anti-capitalist struggle, began to engage in a series of anti-authoritarian practices and concepts. Heavily repressed at the end of 1977, the Italian autonomia declined.

Over the following decade, autonomism spread to Germany and France, where its sociology evolved alongside the changing nature of capitalism in Europe. It began to influence a younger or more marginalized population that sought to act through direct action and established numerous squats and alternative experiments. Here again, the central aspect of these autonomist movements remained Marxist thought, developed and re-utilized within Maoist K-groups, among others. Some autonomists of this period engaged in terrorist actions targeting the state or capitalism, notably through groups such as Action Directe (AD) and the Red Army Faction (RAF). After a peak decade, both movements disappeared by the end of the 1980s, either re-integrated into their respective states following the legalization of squats or abandoned by more moderate elements critical of terrorist methods.

After a period of uncertainty during the 1990s, autonomism was reborn in conjunction with anarchism, particularly in France, where the two movements increasingly merged, a dynamic that had already begun in the 1970s. This new emergence of autonomism, referred to as autonomist anarchism, is distinguished by its abandonment of its Marxist and communist heritage and its increasing integration into the anarchist movement. This movement, sometimes called 'toto', participated in black bloc style tactics, ZADs, free parties, and squatting, while maintaining conflictual relations with the traditional institutions of the anarchist movement. Since the second half of the 2010s, it has been considered by several researchers to be an integral part of the anarchist movement.

== Etymology and terminology ==
The term autonomism derives from the concept of autonomia developed in Italy in the late 1960s and early 1970s. The etymology of this term is Greek, coming from the word αὐτονομία, which means 'freedom to use its own laws'.

In Germans-speaking context, the term Autonomen was used since the late 1970s to refer to a distinct if heterogeneous scene of urban social movement activists involved in countercultural practices and social struggles.

Various other designations exist, depending on the researchers and the specific periods of autonomism being discussed. For instance, in 2000, the Marxist scholar Harry Cleaver referred to "autonomist Marxism" when examining the use of Marxism by autonomists up to that point, which was significant, because he invented this terminology in the 1990s. Conversely, in 2021, Isabelle Sommier, a European far-left specialist teaching at La Sorbonne, rather used the term 'anarcho-autonomism' (already used by European police forces since 2000) while focusing on the increasingly significant convergence between autonomists and anarchists since the 2000s and 2010s, which has led autonomists to move away from their Marxist heritage in favor of anarchism.

== History ==
=== Context : Marxist antecedents in Trotskyist thought and Socialisme ou Barbarie (1950s-late 1960s) ===
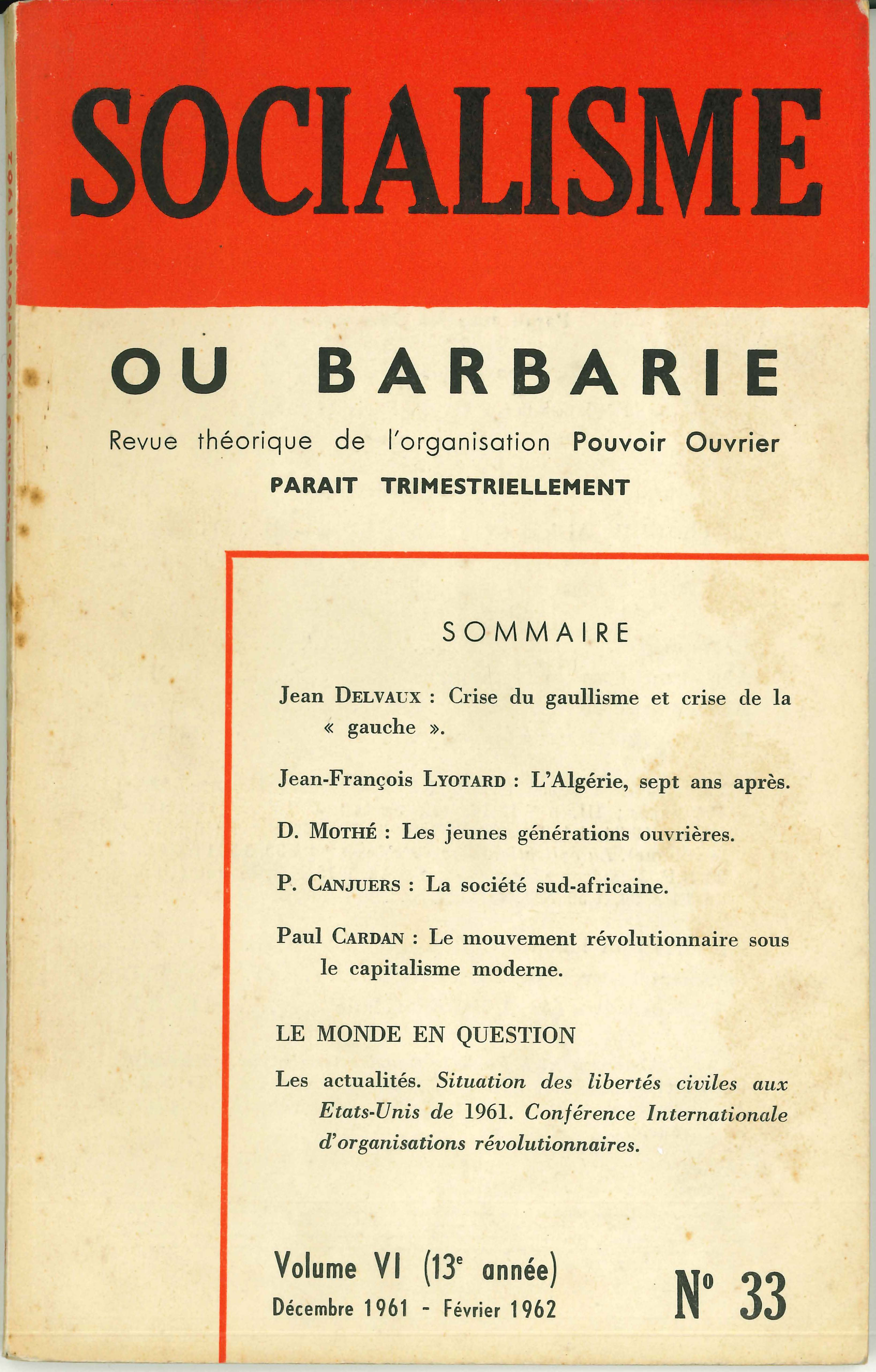
Issue 33 of Socialisme ou Barbarie (1961)

One of the earliest antecedents was the Johnson–Forest Tendency, a faction within the American Trotskyist movement in the 1940s led by C. L. R. James and Raya Dunayevskaya. Disillusioned with the orthodox Trotskyist analysis of the Soviet Union as a "degenerate workers' state", they developed a theory of state capitalism, arguing that the USSR was a variation of the same phase of capitalist development occurring in the West. Their analysis was grounded in the study of production relations, identifying the introduction of Taylorism and Fordism in both the US and the USSR as new forms of domination.

Crucially, unlike the Frankfurt School, which saw only domination in these new technologies, the Johnson–Forest Tendency emphasized the power of workers to oppose them. They documented the autonomous struggles of rank-and-file workers against both management and union bureaucracies, particularly in the Detroit auto industry. James also argued that the independent struggles of Black workers constituted a vanguard of the American working class. This led to a "total repudiation of the theory and practice of the Leninist theory of the Vanguard Party", in favor of recognizing that new organizational forms arise spontaneously from workers' own experiences.

In France, a parallel development occurred with the formation of the Socialisme ou Barbarie group (1949–1965), led by Cornelius Castoriadis and Claude Lefort. They broke with Trotskyism for similar reasons as Johnson–Forest, with whom they were in direct contact. They also developed a critique of Soviet bureaucracy and focused on "workers' daily resistance in industry", translating and publishing accounts of American workers' struggles to inform their own analyses of the French context. These currents directly influenced the Italian workerists through Danilo Montaldi, who translated and circulated their work, providing early Italian thinkers with analyses of autonomous workers' struggles inside modern factories. Facing Reality, a 1958 book co-written by Castoriadis with James and Grace Lee Boggs of the Johnson-Forest Tendency had an influence on both Italian Autonomia and Black auto workers organizing in Detroit.

=== Birth and development in Italy (late 1960s-1977) ===
Between the late 1960s and early 1970s, autonomism as a political movement emerged in Italy in the form of autonomia. At the time, it was a deeply working-class movement, uniting thousands of workers around two fundamental points: "class struggle made itself autonomous of the circulation of capital; and [that] the class struggle was not led by traditional organizations of the Left (communists and their trade unions)". One of the reasons for this emergence was the migration of numerous workers from the South of Italy to the North.

These workers, who did not share in the tradition of socialist labor, were initially employed as anti-communist strikebreakers but soon became deeply revolted against the existing system themselves. They engaged in a series of experiments and activities, especially from 1969 onwards, outside of the Italian Communist Party; their practices ranged from squatting to autoriduzione (self-reduction), which refers to the collective refusal to pay the full price for essential goods and services. They also engaged in widespread absenteism from factories.

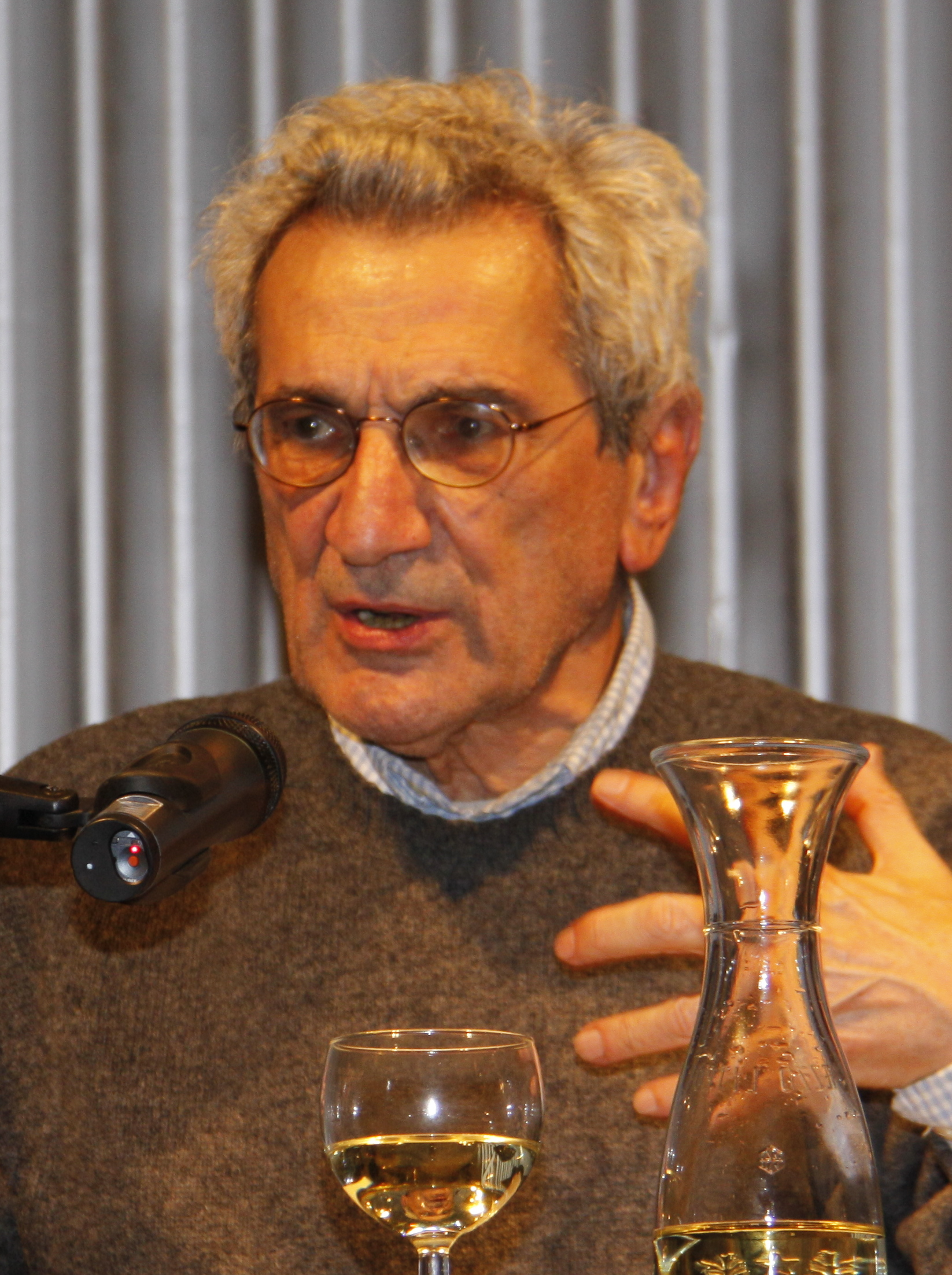
Toni Negri taken in photograph in 2009

This dynamic was driven by internal criticisms formulated against the Italian Communist Party by several Marxist thinkers such as Toni Negri, Raniero Panzieri, Romano Alquati, or Mario Tronti, who began to develop broad critiques of the party's bureaucratic and centralized structure; many who were members left the party in the face of its inability to rejuvenate and reinvent itself. Their theoretical work led to the birth of a movement known as operaismo which later gave the theoretical armature of emerging autonomism. Operaismo reached its peak in the “Hot Autumn" of 1969, when a general strike was launched across the country and 600,000 metalworkers demonstrated in Turin. This period saw operaismo move from being a primarily journal-based tendency to informing a number of revolutionary organisations, chief among them Potere Operaio (Workers' Power), formed in 1969. Potere Operaio attempted to generalise the struggles taking place inside the factories, linking them to conflicts in the broader society, such as housing struggles and student protests. Artists and designers affiliated with the group, such as Mario Mariotti, Giovanni Anceschi and Gianfranco Baruchello, contributed to its visual culture through posters, journal layouts, and militant artworks that reflected its political line. However, disappointed by the failure of the Hot Autumn's factory struggles to translate into a direct political challenge to the state, the group's analysis became increasingly pessimistic. It began to stress the necessity of an "armed party" and an insurrectional strategy to break the political impasse, a shift that marked a departure from its earlier focus on the immanent power of workers' struggles.

Whereas operaismo (like the Johnson-Forest Tendency and Socialisme Ou Barbarie) emphasised the antagonism between labour and capital in the sphere of capitalist production, and particular in the factory, autonomia increasingly emphasised social reproduction and community. Furthermore, Italian autonomia was rooted sociological groups outside the male industrial workforce: students and youth, and women. Consequently, many new individuals became politicized within these circles and through exposure to these ideas, subsequently joining the Italian autonomia.

As Potere Operaio entered into crisis and eventually dissolved in 1973, its most prominent theorist, Antonio Negri, began to develop a significant evolution of workerist thought. Negri argued that capitalist restructuring in response to the mass worker's struggles had led to the emergence of what Mario Tronti named a "social factory", where the entire society was put to work for capital. Consequently, the central political figure was no longer the mass worker confined to the factory, but the "social worker" (operaio sociale). This new proletariat was a heterogeneous figure that included not only factory workers but also students, the unemployed, precarious workers in the service sector, and women engaged in unwaged domestic labour, all of whom contributed to the reproduction of capital.

This theory provided the framework for the political movement of Autonomia Operaia ("Workers' Autonomy") in the mid-1970s. This loose network of collectives engaged in a wide range of struggles beyond the factory, including rent strikes, squatting, and "self-reduction" campaigns where communities collectively refused to pay increased prices for public transport, electricity, and food. The movement's aesthetics reflected this new, diffuse social subject, with journals like Rosso and A/traverso adopting a graffiti-like, proto-punk style that contrasted with the modernist austerity of earlier workerist publications.

Negri's demand for a "social wage" was picked up by autonomist feminists such as Mariarosa Dalla Costa and Sylvia Federici in Italy and Selma James in the US, leading to the movement for Wages for Housework launched in 1972.

During this mid-1970s period, the autonomist movement in Italy had two main currents: Autonomia Creativa, a countercultural scene which challenged conventional politics - itself divided into the Circoli del Proletario Giovanile, the “Circles of Young Workers”, formed in 1974 as affinity groups in marginal neighbouroods engaged in activities such as mass looting, and the Indiani Metropolitani, the “Urban Indians” - and Autonomia Operaia Organizzat, which sought to transform spontaneous revolt into a sustained and organised attack on the capitalist system. Autonomia Creativa was heavily involved in the Free Radio movement, with Radio Alice in Bologna its best known station.

The "Movement of '77", a widespread youth and student revolt that swept Italy, marked both the high point of Autonomia's influence and the beginning of its end. The movement's confrontational style and the rise of political violence, including the activities of armed groups like the Red Brigades, created a climate of intense crisis. In the years after 1977, Italian autonomia declined. This situation was due, on the one hand, to the fact that the Italian state and corporations undertook widespread repression targeting the movement, for example, by equating it with terrorist actions, and, on the other, to the fact that unions managed to reintegrate these dissidents by implementing horizontal structures at the lowest levels of their organizations. In 1979, the "final blow" against it was made when Negri and thousands of others were arrested by the Italian state in very violent police raids.

=== German and French autonomist movements : generalization to Western Europe (late 1970s-1989) ===
Following the repression of the Italian movement, a large number of them managed to head into exile and reach France or other neighboring countries. In Germany specifically, other dynamics were at work, notably around the journal Autonomie. In both cases, the influence of Maoism or anti-authoritarian ideas was strong, as these movements sought to find a Marxist ideology that would allow them to criticize both imperialism and the Stalinist politics of the USSR or the official Communist parties (PCF and KPD respectively).

Although the two movements shared many points of agreement and similarity, the French movement remained a minority and marginal in the country, while the German Autonomen managed to gather a significant portion of the country. In both cases, the sociology evolved compared to the Italian movement; it was no longer a matter of factory workers but of radicalized youth and marginals instead. Consequently, in Germany, one of the first struggles they integrated into was the struggle for housing; they participated both in numerous squatting practices and in rent strikes, and took a great interest in these struggles from the get-go. From the early 1970s, the term Spontis (spontaneous) was used to describe radical urban youth countercultures in neighbourhoods such as Berlin's Kreuzberg and Wedding. The Spontis were influenced by the Italian scene, with the Indiani Metropolitani the model of the German Stadtindianer, and the Italian Free Radio influencing a similar German movement.

New informal, horizontal, and non-authoritarian networks emerged in these spaces; squats increasingly allowed young people, marginalized individuals, feminist women, and environmentalists to connect by providing them with new places to meet, interact, and conduct collective experiments separate from official party structures. Berlin activists founded the Info-BUG (Info Berliner UndogmatischerGruppen) in 1974, which served as the Spontis’ main publication untilthe late 1970s. In Germany in the 1970s, many of these young people gathered, among other places, in the K-Groups, horizontal groups influenced by various Marxist trends including Marxist–Leninism or Maoism, which brought together up to 10,000 people at their peak.

Logo of the Red Army Faction (RAF)

The emergence of this movement was due to other dynamics than in Italy, partly because this generation realized that many former Nazis had been reintegrated into the West German state apparatus, especially its police forces, which convinced them that peaceful and legal struggle had no future. This gave an increasingly radical aspect to the K-Groups, many of whom became growingly interested in violent action and urban guerrilla warfare. These years thus saw the emergence of groups of a terrorist nature, intended to fight against capitalism and the French or German states; in Germany, this was primarily the Red Army Faction (RAF), while in France, it involved the group Action Directe (AD).

Logo of Action Directe (AD)

By the 1980s, while of the K-Group activists had been drawn into terrorism, others had been drawn into formal politics through the Green Party. Those who remained involved in autonomous, horizontal activism became known as the Autonomen. The Black bloc tactic emerged among German Autonomen in the early 1980s in response to state repression of squatting. The peak of the German movement occurred in the latter half of the 1980s, with the growing integration of Autonomen into German anti-nuclear and anti-imperialist struggles; they had by then consolidated bases of action in Berlin, Hamburg, Amsterdam, and Copenhagen, spreading throughout Western Europe.

=== 1990s : fall of the USSR and recomposition of the European far-left ===
Between the late 1980s and 1991, the USSR and its satellite states, the Eastern Bloc, underwent a series of events that led to their collapse and the reunification of Germany into a single state. In parallel with these major geopolitical developments on the world stage, other dynamics took shape within the far-left, including the growing discredit of Marxism–Leninism and forms of state socialism in general. This led, among other things, to the rebirth of the anarchist movement, which gradually "eclipsed" these opposing tendencies within the far-left and regained an increasingly central importance within it, according to historians Spencer Beswick and the Marxist historian Max Elbaum.

The Zapatista uprising of 1994 was also very influential on autonomism in this period.

Self-managed social centres in Italy, which had emerged from Italian autonomia in the 1970s, thrived in the 1990s and became globally influential. The black bloc tactic was adapted by Italian autonomists Ya Basta Association (formed in the social centres in 1994, inspired by the Zapatistas) who used padded white overalls at protests; such blocs were known as the Tute Bianche, who went on to inspire the WOMBLES in the UK.

=== 2000s-2020s : the rise of the 'totos' and gradual joining of the anarchist movement ===
At the turn of the century, several mobilizations pushed anarchists and autonomists into the same struggles, notably within the anti-globalization movement, particularly during the battle of Seattle (1999) or the anti-G8 protests in Genoa (2001), where both participated extensively in the black bloc and Tute Bianche, and subsequently during later mobilizations in Europe in the 2000s. In reality, this dynamic of increasing proximity was not entirely new, as the autonomists of previous generations, who had been primarily Marxist, had gradually, and as early as the 1970s, rediscovered anarchism, and, according to Isabelle Sommier, begun to increasingly reintegrate some of its practices and ideas.

As early as 2000, French intelligence services reported on what they termed the "anarcho-autonomous" (in short: 'toto') movement, which at the time occupied a relatively marginal place in a report; eight years later, this movement occupied a central place in their reports. According to Sommier, these convergences were accompanied by a gradual abandonment of the Marxist and communist traditions that had marked the origins of autonomism.

However, these activists operated outside, and were often in conflict with, the historical structures of the anarchist movement in France, notably the Fédération anarchiste (FA) and the CNT, which they accused of being too institutionalized and useless. Initially, these organizations struggled to consider them as anarchists in their own right, but this situation evolved during the 2010s. Generally speaking, they are young people radicalized by state repression and violence, particularly in France, who wish to carry out direct actions, such as sabotage, participating in black blocs; they exert a strong influence within ZADs, free parties or squats and are integrated into fluid networks that are in constant militant recomposition. Anarchist historian Francis Dupuis-Déri, who uses the terminology of anarcho-autonomous and considered them full members of the anarchist movement in 2018, noted a reluctance to interact with established anarchist organizations, even though this may occur in their personal lives or even within the context of a single mobilization in very fluid contexts.

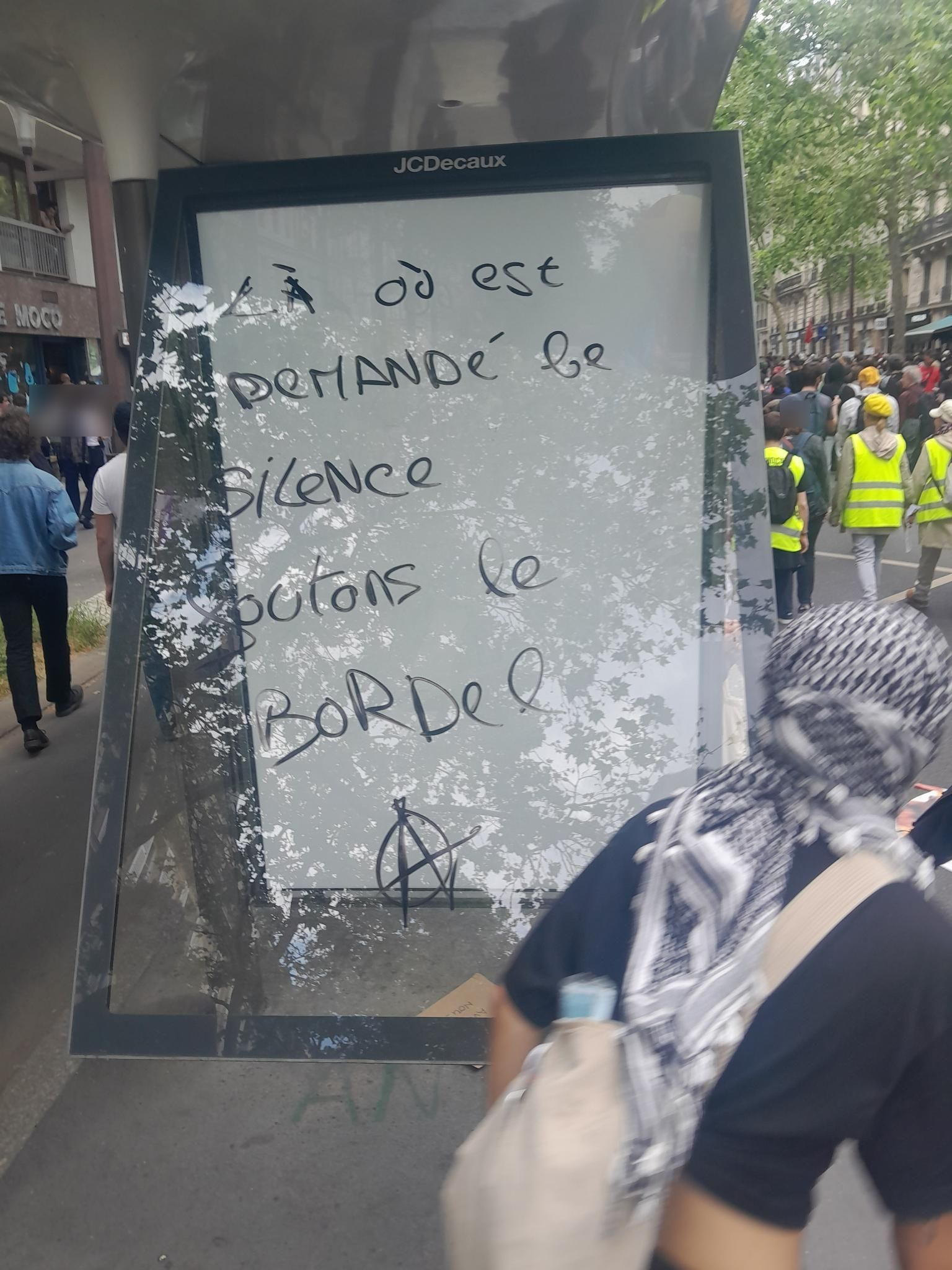
Toto with a keffiyeh after doing an anarchist tag reading 'When they ask for silence, let's make chaos' during May Day 2026

In 2021, Sommier reported that although they were becoming increasingly close to anarchism and could be considered as individualist anarchists at that point, conflicts persisted with the anarchist organizations; two years later, she added on these links and growing identification, that they were then part of the "anti-authoritarian movement resulting from the expulsion of anarchists in the aftermath of the great battle between Marx and Bakunin", that is to say, anarchism.

== Bibliography ==
- Beswick, Spencer (2022), "From the Ashes of the Old: Anarchism Reborn in a Counterrevolutionary Age (1970s-1990s)", Anarchist Studies, 30 (2): 31–54, doi:10.3898/AS.30.2.02
- Cleaver, Harry (2000). Reading Capital Politically (2nd ed.). Leeds / Edinburgh: AK Press / Anti/Theses. ISBN 1-902593-29-4.
- Cuninghame, Patrick (8 December 2010), "Autonomism as a global movement", The Journal of Labor and Society, vol. 13, no. 4, pp. 451–464, doi:10.1111/j.1743-4580.2010.00305.x
- Dupuis-Déri, Francis (2018). Les nouveaux anarchistes: de l'altermondialisme au zadisme. Paris: Textuel. ISBN 978-2-84597-750-1.
- Galimberti, Jacopo (2022). Images of Class. Operaismo, Autonomia and the Visual Arts (1962-1988). Verso Books. ISBN 978-1-8397-6531-5.
- Garland, Christian (2009). "Autonomism". In Ness, Immanuel (ed.). The International Encyclopedia of Revolution and Protest. Wiley. pp. 322–324. doi:10.1002/9781405198073.wbierp0152. ISBN 978-1-4051-8464-9.
- Geronimo (2012). Fire and Flames: A History of the German Autonomist Movement. Oakland: PM Press. ISBN 978-1-60486-097-9.
- Katsiaficas, George N. (2006). The subversion of politics: European autonomous social movements and the decolonization of everyday life. Oakland, CA: AK Press. ISBN 978-1-904859-53-6.
- Sarbanes, Janet (2022-06-02). Letters on the Autonomy Project (PDF). Earth, Milky Way: Punctum Books. doi:10.53288/0358.1.00. ISBN 978-1-68571-042-2.
- Schifres, Sébastien (September 2004), La mouvance autonome en France de 1976 à 1984 (PDF) (Mémoire de maîtrise d'histoire-sociologie), Université de Nanterre
- Smaligo, Nick (2017-11-14). "From Autonomen to Antifa: Interview with George Katsiaficas". The New Inquiry.
- Sommier, Isabelle (2021-03-30). "Chapitre 1. La discontinuité des violences idéologiques". Violences politiques en France. Presses de Sciences Po. pp. 27–54. ISBN 978-2-7246-2730-5.
- Sommier, Isabelle (2023-06-05). "Commission d'enquête sur la structuration, le financement, les moyens et les modalités d'action des groupuscules auteurs de violences" [Commission of Inquiry into the structure, funding, means and methods of action of small groups responsible for violence]. Assemblée nationale.
- Wright, Steve (2017). Storming Heaven: Class Composition and Struggle in Italian Autonomist Marxism (2nd ed.). London: Pluto Press. ISBN 978-0-7453-9990-4.

== See also ==
- Antifa
- Autonomedia
- Temporary Autonomous Zone
