= Operaismo =

Italian Marxist tendency

Operaismo (Italian for "workerism") was a heterodox Marxist political and theoretical tendency that emerged in Italy in the early 1960s. Its foundational insight, a "Copernican revolution" in Marxist thought, was to invert the traditional relationship between capital and labour, positing that the struggles of the working class were the primary driving force of capitalist development. Capital, in this view, does not develop along its own internal laws but is forced to restructure and innovate in response to working-class antagonism.

Originating from dissident circles within the Italian Communist Party (PCI) and Italian Socialist Party (PSI) during Italy's post-war "economic miracle", operaismo's key thinkers included Raniero Panzieri, Mario Tronti, Antonio Negri, Sergio Bologna, and Romano Alquati. Their analysis was initially developed in journals such as Quaderni Rossi (1961–1965) and Classe Operaia (1964–1967). The central analytical category of operaismo was "class composition", which examines the relationship between the material structure of the working class (its technical composition) and its capacity for political self-organisation (its political composition). This analysis was often informed by a novel method of "workers' inquiry" (inchiesta operaia), a form of militant co-research (conricerca) conducted with factory workers.

At its height in the late 1960s and 1970s, during a period of intense social conflict in Italy known as the "Hot Autumn", operaismo provided the theoretical framework for revolutionary groups like Potere Operaio and, in its later development, the broader Autonomia Operaia movement. Key concepts such as the "refusal of work" and the analysis of the "mass worker" and later the "social worker" (operaio sociale) were influential, as was its critical engagement with aesthetics and culture. Following the decline of the movements in the late 1970s and increased state repression, operaismo as a coherent tendency collapsed. Its legacy, however, continued through its influence on autonomist Marxism, post-Marxism, the theoretical work of figures like Michael Hardt and Negri; and even post-war Italian anarchism.

== Etymology and definition ==
The term operaismo literally translates from Italian as "workerism". Initially a derogatory term used by critics to denote an excessive focus on industrial workers, it was later adopted by the tendency's adherents. While much of operaismo's analysis centred on the factory, its specific properties went beyond this general definition. Unlike earlier forms of "workerism" such as council communism or Stalinist workerism, Italian operaismo was a "workerism against work", which sought to destroy the condition of being a worker rather than glorify or extend it.

The core of operaismo was its "political reading" of Karl Marx's Capital, which sought to structure its entire approach around the immediate development of working-class struggle. This involved rejecting abstract theorising in favour of grasping concepts only within the concrete totality of struggle they designated. The most distinctive feature of operaismo was the importance it placed on the relationship between the material structure of the working class and its autonomous behaviour, a relationship it termed the nexus between "technical composition" and "political composition". As Mario Tronti proclaimed, operaismo sought to establish the idea of an "internal history of the working class" as a methodological principle, countering the traditional Marxist focus on the internal history of capital. For operaismo, Marx's work was not an ideology of the workers' movement, but its "revolutionary theory".

== Origins ==
=== Political context: Italian left in the 1950s ===
Operaismo emerged as a political response to the crisis of the traditional Italian labour movement in the 1950s, a period described by Gigi Roggero as a "political desert". The post-war period in Italy was marked by profound economic transformation, as the country rapidly industrialised in what became known as the "economic miracle". In contrast to other Western countries, it was only in the 1950s that Italy experienced the full development of Taylorism and Fordism. This period saw a massive internal migration from the rural South to the industrial North, creating a new generation of factory workers with little experience of unionism or the traditional culture of the left.

The mainstream left, dominated by the Italian Communist Party (PCI) and the Italian Socialist Party (PSI), struggled to respond to these changes. The PCI, under Palmiro Togliatti, pursued a strategy of national unity and "progressive democracy", prioritising productivity and economic reconstruction over open class conflict. This policy, combined with the political division of the union movement and an employer offensive in the workplace, led to the left's increasing isolation from the shop floor, symbolised by the PCI-aligned union's loss of its majority at FIAT in 1955. The events of 1956—the crushing of the Hungarian Revolution and Nikita Khrushchev's "Secret Speech" denouncing Joseph Stalin—deepened the crisis, having a "heartbreaking" impact on many Italian communists. While the PCI weathered the storm by formally committing to an "Italian road to socialism", the PSI experienced a fundamental break, moving away from its alliance with the Communists towards a centre-left coalition government. It was within this context of political and theoretical malaise that a new approach to Marxism began to form.

=== Intellectual precursors ===
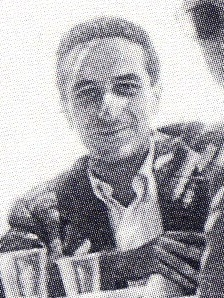
Raniero Panzieri

Raniero Panzieri, a dissident figure within the PSI, was one of the most important precursors to operaismo. In the late 1950s, particularly during his time as co-director of the PSI's theoretical journal Mondo Operaio, Panzieri began to develop a critique of the historic left's subordination of class to party. Drawing on a libertarian interpretation of Marx, he rejected the "absurd identity between working class and party" consolidated by Stalinism and reaffirmed "the principle of class action as the autonomy of the exploited". Panzieri championed "cultural work", including engagement with art and literature, and sought to give workers a direct voice, for instance by publishing insider reports on factory life. He argued for a renovation of the labour movement "from below and in forms of total democracy", with new institutions rooted in the economic sphere. After being marginalised within the PSI and removed from Mondo Operaio in 1959, an embittered Panzieri moved to Turin to work for the Einaudi publishing house, where he connected with a younger generation of militants who shared his critiques.

Another significant intellectual influence was the philosopher Galvano Della Volpe, a Communist whose "scientific" or "Galilean" reading of Marx stood in sharp contrast to the historicist tradition dominant in the PCI. Della Volpe argued that Marx's method was a rigorous materialist science based on "determinate abstractions"—concepts worked up from concrete historical observation and continually re-submitted for verification. His insistence on returning to Marx's critique of political economy, and particularly his focus on Capital as a scientific analysis of a specific historical society, provided the methodological groundwork for the future operaisti, particularly Mario Tronti, to bypass the dominant traditions of Italian Marxism and rethink Marx from scratch.

== Early development and journals ==
=== Quaderni Rossi ===
The first collective expression of operaismo was the journal Quaderni Rossi (Red Notebooks), first published by Panzieri and his associates in 1961. The journal brought together dissident socialists, Communist intellectuals, and trade unionists who were critical of the labour movement's failure to understand the changes wrought by post-war capitalist development. A central theme was the rejection of the idea that technology was an autonomous, progressive force; instead, Panzieri argued that capitalist use of machinery was a form of class domination. In his influential essay "The Capitalist Use of Machinery", he contended that "it is precisely capitalist 'despotism' which takes the form of technological rationality". Under modern capitalism, capitalist planning extended from the factory to society as a whole, but the sole limit to this development was the resistance of the working class. The journal had a distinctive paperback design, with classic typefaces like Baskerville and text that began on the front cover, a graphic conceit that made its contents immediately visible and reflected a movement from the inside to the outside.

The group became known for its use of "workers' inquiry" (inchiesta operaia), a method of militant research that combined sociological techniques with political work inside the factories. Drawing inspiration from the French group Socialisme ou Barbarie, the American Correspondence group, and the research of militant sociologist Danilo Montaldi, researchers like Romano Alquati conducted detailed studies of working-class life and attitudes at major factories like FIAT and Olivetti. Alquati's "Report on the New Forces" at FIAT was a pioneering analysis of the new "mass worker" (operaio massa): the young, often Southern migrant, semi-skilled assembly-line worker who was alienated from both the company and the traditional unions, but who was beginning to develop new forms of autonomous struggle. This method of inquiry sought to uncover the "class political line" immanent in the daily behaviours and attitudes of workers themselves. Alquati's approach, which he termed "co-research" (conricerca), was distinct from Panzieri's "workers' inquiry". While Panzieri's method sought to analyse struggles as they happened (inchiesta a caldo, or inquiry in the heat of the moment), Alquati sought to anticipate them in the "gray zone" before they erupted (inchiesta tepida, or tepid inquiry), seeing coresearch as "simultaneously the production of organization and of counter-subjectivity".

=== Classe Operaia and Tronti's "Copernican revolution" ===
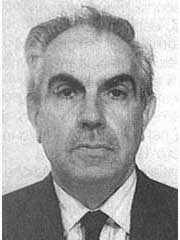
Mario Tronti in 1992

A major split occurred within the Quaderni Rossi group following the Piazza Statuto riots in Turin in 1962, during which striking FIAT workers attacked the offices of the conservative Italian Labour Union (UIL). While Panzieri and his supporters were hesitant, a more radical faction centred around Mario Tronti saw the event as a confirmation of the working class's growing political autonomy from the official labour movement. This faction broke away to form the journal Classe Operaia (Working Class), which ran from 1964 to 1967 and marked the beginning of operaismo's "classical phase".

In the first issue of the journal, Tronti articulated operaismo's core thesis in what he called a reversal of the traditional Marxist perspective:

We too have worked with a concept that puts capitalist development first, and workers second. This is a mistake. And now we have to turn the problem on its head ... and start again from the beginning: and the beginning is the class struggle of the working class.

This was the "Copernican revolution" of operaismo: working-class struggle was not a result of the contradictions of capitalist development, but its motor. Capital is forced to constantly revolutionise its methods of production, management, and even its political structures (the state) as a reaction to workers' antagonism. This led Tronti to analyse the modern state's turn to economic planning (such as the centre-left government's policies) not as a step towards socialism, but as capital's attempt to control the primary political threat to its rule: the wage struggles of the working class. For Tronti, the wage struggle was therefore an inherently political struggle that could "place in crisis the economic mechanism of capitalist development". This perspective also led Tronti to develop the concept of the "social factory", in which the factory's logic of production and command extends to dominate the whole of society, and the political state itself becomes an agent of the capitalist mode of production.

The journal's visual identity, designed by artist and group member Manfredo Massironi, used a lowercase title and the classicist Bodoni font, creating a style of modernist graphic design aligned with its political activism. It also featured cartoons by artist Mario Mariotti that gave visual form to the workerist conception of the working class as a monstrous, "anti-social", and "pagan" force, starkly contrasting with the heroic and respectable imagery of the official labour movement.

== Key concepts ==
- Class composition: This is the central analytical tool of operaismo. It is understood as having two sides. "Technical composition" refers to the material organisation of labour-power by capital—the division of labour, skill levels, types of machinery used, and wage structures. "Political composition" refers to the working class's subjective behaviour—its forms of struggle, its culture, its needs, and its methods of self-organisation. Operaismo posits a dynamic and non-mechanical relationship between the two, where a specific technical composition creates the conditions for a certain political composition to emerge, which in turn forces capital to alter the technical composition to decompose the class's power. The concept aims to understand class as a dynamic process of struggle, conflict, and subjectivity, rejecting the static sociological categories of traditional Marxism and its distinction between "class in itself" and "class for itself".
- Refusal of work: Going beyond traditional union demands for better wages and conditions, operaismo identified and theorised a working-class tendency to struggle against the very fact of being a worker. The "refusal of work" was a political strategy that aimed to sever the link between productivity and wages, and to oppose the capitalist organisation of labour as such. It manifested in practices like absenteeism, sabotage, slowdowns, and struggles for "more money, less work", which were seen not as apolitical acts but as concrete expressions of antagonism to the capital relation. The operaisti even interpreted the passivity of new workers who refused to strike as a form of refusal, seeing it as a struggle against the established unions and their co-management of exploitation.
- Workers' inquiry (inchiesta operaia): This was a political and research method developed to overcome the separation between intellectuals and workers. It involved militants entering workplaces not to "bring" consciousness to workers, but to investigate, with the workers themselves, the concrete reality of exploitation and the forms of resistance that were already developing. It combined sociological tools like questionnaires and interviews with the militant's participation in struggles, with the goal of identifying and organising the autonomous political subjectivity of the class. The term conricerca ("co-research") emphasised this collaborative nature. It was understood as a "method of political action from below", aiming to transform objective conditions into subjective force.
- The mass worker (operaio massa): This was the political figure identified by operaismo in the 1960s as the protagonist of the new cycle of struggles. The mass worker was the semi-skilled, interchangeable worker on the Fordist assembly line, lacking the professional identity and craft pride of the older skilled worker. Often a young migrant from Southern Italy, this figure was seen as an outsider to the traditional culture of the labour movement. While technically deskilled and subordinated to the rhythm of the machine, this very homogeneity and shared condition of alienation created the basis for a new, more radical form of mass struggle based on egalitarian demands and direct opposition to the organisation of production.

== Historiography ==
Operaismo developed its own distinctive approach to historiography, which challenged the institutional focus of the dominant PCI-aligned school of historical writing. Instead of tracing the history of the party or the unions, workerist historians sought to write a history "from below", centred on the autonomous behaviour and struggles of the working class itself. This "militant history" was explicitly intended to be partial and subordinate to present-day struggles.

Sergio Bologna's 1967 essay on the German council movement was a foundational text. It analysed the skilled workers of the German machine industry as a specific class composition whose project of workers' self-management, while ultimately defeated, was able to "provoke the crisis and to freeze capitalist development". Another early figure, the militant sociologist Danilo Montaldi, conducted "participatory and militant inquiry" into the lives of marginalised political figures and immigrant workers, using oral history to document their experiences. Other important works included studies of fascism as a political response to working-class insurgency, and detailed reconstructions of specific cycles of struggle. Workerist historians showed a particular fascination with the history of the American working class and the Industrial Workers of the World (IWW), which they saw as a historical example of a class movement that combined radical struggle with an indifference to traditional socialist ideology. Later, the journal Primo Maggio, founded by Bologna in 1973, became a key vehicle for a "militant history" that was explicitly "subordinate to struggle" and made extensive use of oral history to explore the complexities of working-class culture, memory, and experience. More recent scholarship has expanded the field, exploring the cultural and aesthetic dimensions of the movement, including its relationship with architecture, design, and the visual arts.

== Later development and fragmentation ==
=== "Hot Autumn" and Potere Operaio ===
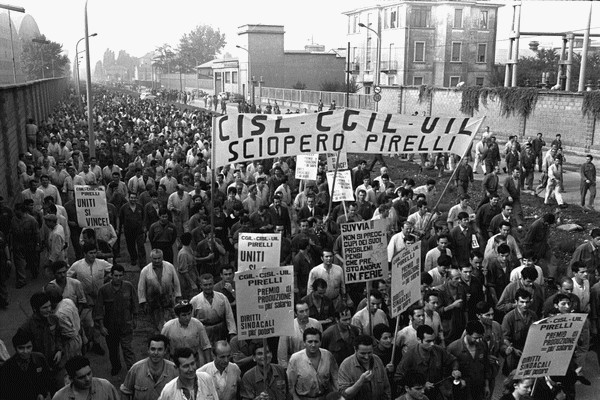
Pirelli workers on strike in Milan during the "Hot Autumn" of 1969

The theories of operaismo found their practical confirmation in the massive wave of industrial unrest that swept Italy from 1968, culminating in the "Hot Autumn" of 1969. Wildcat strikes, factory occupations, and mass assemblies, often organised by autonomous rank-and-file committees (Comitati Unitari di Base, CUBs) outside the control of the official unions, became widespread, particularly at FIAT in Turin and Pirelli in Milan. The struggles were led by the "mass worker" and were characterised by egalitarian demands (equal wage increases for all) and a direct challenge to management's control over the pace and organisation of work.

This period saw operaismo move from being a primarily journal-based tendency to informing a number of revolutionary organisations, chief among them Potere Operaio (Workers' Power), formed in 1969. Potere Operaio attempted to generalise the struggles taking place inside the factories, linking them to conflicts in the broader society, such as housing struggles and student protests. Artists and designers affiliated with the group, such as Mario Mariotti, Giovanni Anceschi and Gianfranco Baruchello, contributed to its visual culture through posters, journal layouts, and militant artworks that reflected its political line. However, disappointed by the failure of the Hot Autumn's factory struggles to translate into a direct political challenge to the state, the group's analysis became increasingly pessimistic. It began to stress the necessity of an "armed party" and an insurrectional strategy to break the political impasse, a shift that marked a departure from its earlier focus on the immanent power of workers' struggles.

=== Negri and the "social worker" ===
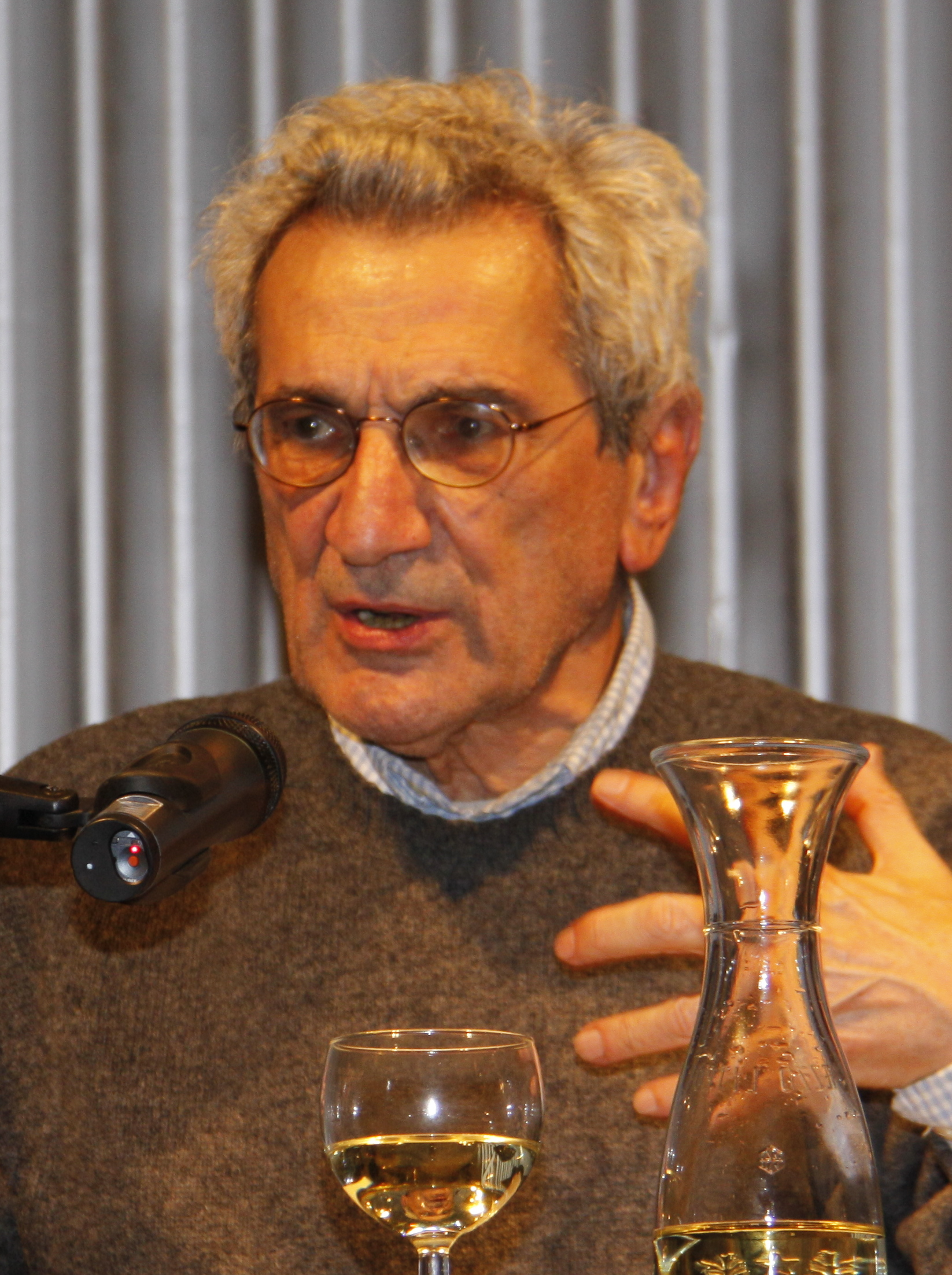
Antonio Negri in 2009

As Potere Operaio entered into crisis and eventually dissolved in 1973, its most prominent theorist, Antonio Negri, began to develop a significant evolution of workerist thought. Negri argued that capitalist restructuring in response to the mass worker's struggles had led to the emergence of a "social factory", where the entire society was put to work for capital. Consequently, the central political figure was no longer the mass worker confined to the factory, but the "social worker" (operaio sociale). This new proletariat was a heterogeneous figure that included not only factory workers but also students, the unemployed, precarious workers in the service sector, and women engaged in unwaged domestic labour, all of whom contributed to the reproduction of capital. Romano Alquati had anticipated this analysis in his work on the university, identifying the emergence of an "intellectual proletariat" composed of young students who were proletarianised by their need to sell their labour-power.

This theory provided the framework for the political movement of Autonomia Operaia ("Workers' Autonomy") in the mid-1970s. This loose network of collectives engaged in a wide range of struggles beyond the factory, including rent strikes, squatting, and "self-reduction" campaigns where communities collectively refused to pay increased prices for public transport, electricity, and food. The movement's aesthetics reflected this new, diffuse social subject, with journals like Rosso and A/traverso adopting a graffiti-like, proto-punk style that contrasted with the modernist austerity of earlier workerist publications. The concept of the social worker represented an attempt to find a common basis of political recomposition for these diverse struggles.

== Collapse and legacy ==
The Italian state's response to the social turmoil of the 1970s was increasingly repressive. The "Movement of '77", a widespread youth and student revolt that swept Italy, marked both the high point of Autonomia's influence and the beginning of its end. The movement's confrontational style and the rise of political violence, including the activities of armed groups like the Red Brigades, created a climate of intense crisis.

The state's crackdown culminated in the mass arrests of 7 April 1979, in which Negri and other intellectuals and militants associated with Autonomia were accused of being the secret leaders of the Red Brigades. Although the specific charges were later shown to be unfounded, the arrests and subsequent trials effectively decapitated the autonomist movement and marked the collapse of operaismo as an organised political force. The memory of this period of struggle and its repression continued to be explored by affiliated artists in the 1980s. The 1983 Milan Triennale installation La casa in comune (The House in Common) by Paolo Deganello and Alberto Magnaghi, for example, used the motif of the house to reflect on issues of community and memory for former militants.

Despite its organisational defeat, operaismo has had a significant intellectual legacy. Its theories were a major influence on the development of autonomism in France, Germany, and beyond. In the English-speaking world, its ideas were explored in journals such as Zerowork and influenced feminist currents like the Wages for Housework campaign, which drew on the workerist analysis of unwaged domestic labour. The work of Negri, particularly his collaboration with Michael Hardt on books like Empire (2000), has brought many of operaismo's core concepts—such as the social factory and class composition (recast as "multitude")—to a wider global audience in the 21st century. This later diffusion, termed "post-operaismo", has been criticised by some of the original operaisti as a depoliticised academic version that turned a militant "movement of thought" into a "school of thought" or a "brand". Gigi Roggero argues that "post-operaismo" was coined in Anglo-Saxon universities "to depoliticize [operaismo] and abstract it from conflict and class composition, to render it good for academia ... and no longer good for struggles".

== Criticism ==
Operaismo faced criticism from its inception. The traditional left, including the PCI, often dismissed the tendency as "extremist" and its analyses as "tenaciously resistant to reality". The journal Rinascita criticised the workerist approach as "factoryist" for its excessive focus on industrial workers.

The tendency was also marked by significant internal debates and critiques. The initial split between Panzieri's faction in Quaderni Rossi and Tronti's in Classe Operaia revolved around tactical differences and fundamental theoretical disagreements. Panzieri's group accused the more radical faction around Alquati of "extremism", calling them "Zengakuren" after the radical Japanese student group. Feminist militants criticised the male chauvinism prevalent in groups like Potere Operaio, which contributed to the departure of female members and the development of an autonomous feminist movement. In the 1970s, as Negri developed his theory of the operaio sociale, he faced criticism from other workerists like Sergio Bologna. Bologna accused Negri of abandoning the concrete, material analysis of the factory for an overly abstract and voluntarist theory of a unified proletarian subject. He argued that Negri had neglected the real divisions and defeats being suffered by the mass worker and had simply "washed his hands" of the movement's difficulties.

In the afterword to Steve Wright's Storming Heaven, Riccardo Bellofiore and Massimiliano Tomba argue that Negri's later work represents an operaismo that "develops in a self-referential manner, almost without further relationship to the social reality it seeks to draw upon and express." They contend that in Negri's thought, "development, crisis, revolution are now the same thing" and that it becomes "pointless to seek mediations, or to claim verifications of reality, in an idealist and subversive apparatus that is self-reproducing". This "irrational" turn, which Gigi Roggero describes as a re-identification of "tendency" with "teleology", transforms the working class into a "hypostasised" subject with a "presumed independent ontological reality", while capital is reduced to a "merely reactive reality". They contrast this with a "materialist" workerism that remains attentive to the concrete and contradictory dynamics of the labour process.

== See also ==
- History of the Italian Republic
