= Refusal of work =

Behavior in which a person refuses regular employment

Refusal of work is behavior in which a person refuses regular employment.

With or without a political or philosophical program, it has been practiced by various subcultures and individuals. It is frequently engaged in by those who critique the concept of work, and it has a long history. Radical political positions have openly advocated refusal of work. From within Marxism it has been advocated by Paul Lafargue and the Italian workerist/autonomists (e.g. Antonio Negri, Mario Tronti), the French ultra-left (e.g. Échanges et Mouvement); and within anarchism (especially Bob Black and the post-left anarchy tendency) it is a common tenet.

== Abolition of unfree labour ==
The Abolition of Forced Labour Convention adopted by International Labour Organization in 1957 prohibits all forms of forced labour.

== Concerns over wage slavery ==
Wage slavery refers to a situation where a person's livelihood depends on wages, especially when the dependence is total and immediate. It is a negatively connoted term used to draw an analogy between slavery and wage labor, and to highlight similarities between owning and employing a person. The term 'wage slavery' has been used to criticize economic exploitation and social stratification, with the former seen primarily as unequal bargaining power between labor and capital (particularly when workers are paid comparatively low wages, e.g. in sweatshops), and the latter as a lack of workers' self-management. The criticism of social stratification covers a wider range of employment choices bound by the pressures of a hierarchical social environment (i.e. working for a wage not only under threat of starvation or poverty, but also of social stigma or status diminution).

Similarities between wage labor and slavery were noted at least as early as Cicero. Before the American Civil War, Southern defenders of African American slavery invoked the concept to favorably compare the condition of their slaves to workers in the North. With the advent of the Industrial Revolution, thinkers such as Proudhon and Marx elaborated the comparison between wage labor and slavery in the context of a critique of property not intended for active personal use.

The introduction of wage labor in 18th century Britain was met with resistance—giving rise to the principles of syndicalism. Historically, some labor organizations and individual social activists, have espoused workers' self-management or worker cooperatives as possible alternatives to wage labor.

== Political views ==
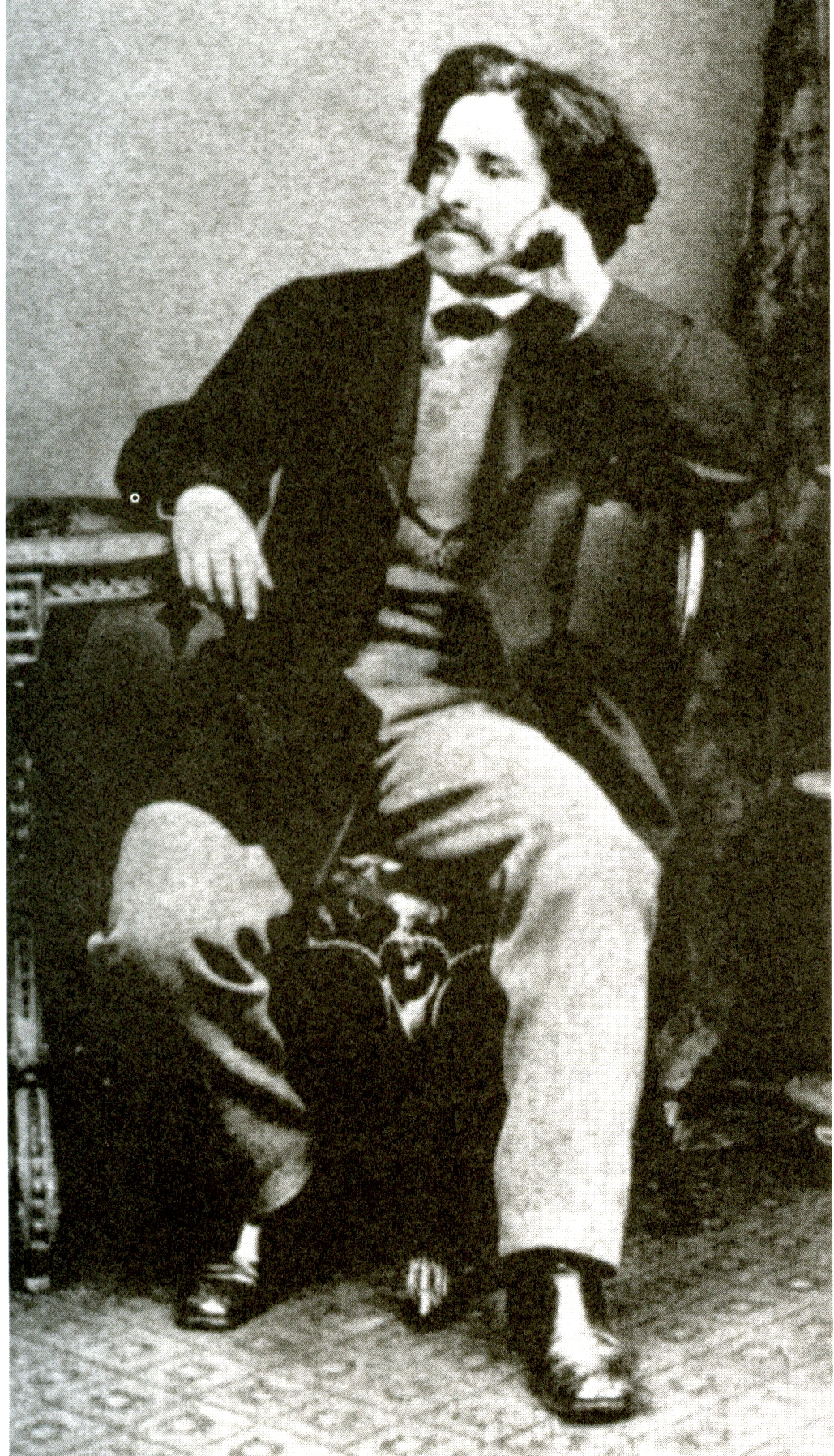
Paul Lafargue, author of book critical of work titled: The Right to Be Lazy

The Right to be Lazy, an essay by Cuban-born French revolutionary Marxist Paul Lafargue, manifests that "When, in our civilized Europe, we would find a trace of the native beauty of man, we must go seek it in the nations where economic prejudices have not yet uprooted the hatred of work ... The Greeks in their era of greatness had only contempt for work: their slaves alone were permitted to labor: the free man knew only exercises for the body and mind ... The philosophers of antiquity taught contempt for work, that degradation of the free man, the poets sang of idleness, that gift from the Gods." And so he says "Proletarians, brutalized by the dogma of work, listen to the voice of these philosophers, which has been concealed from you with jealous care: A citizen who gives his labor for money degrades himself to the rank of slaves." (The last sentence paraphrasing Cicero.)

Raoul Vaneigem, theorist of the post-surrealist Situationist International which was influential in the May 68 events in France, wrote The Book of Pleasures. In it he says that "You reverse the perspective of power by returning to pleasure the energies stolen by work and constraint ... As sure as work kills pleasure, pleasure kills work. If you are not resigned to dying of disgust, then you will be happy enough to rid your life of the odious need to work, to give orders (and obey them), to lose and to win, to keep up appearances, and to judge and be judged."

Autonomist philosopher Bifo defines refusal of work as not "so much the obvious fact that workers do not like to be exploited, but something more. It means that the capitalist restructuring, the technological change, and the general transformation of social institutions are produced by the daily action of withdrawal from exploitation, of rejection of the obligation to produce surplus value, and to increase the value of capital, reducing the value of life." More simply he states "Refusal of work means ... I don't want to go to work because I prefer to sleep. But this laziness is the source of intelligence, of technology, of progress. Autonomy is the self-regulation of the social body in its independence and in its interaction with the disciplinary norm."

As a social development Bifo remembers,

that one of the strong ideas of the movement of autonomy proletarians during the 70s was the idea "precariousness is good". Job precariousness is a form of autonomy from steady regular work, lasting an entire life. In the 1970s many people used to work for a few months, then to go away for a journey, then back to work for a while. This was possible in times of almost full employment and in times of egalitarian culture. This situation allowed people to work in their own interest and not in the interest of capitalists, but quite obviously this could not last forever, and the neoliberal offensive of the 1980s was aimed to reverse the rapport de force."

As a response to these developments his view is that "the dissemination of self-organized knowledge can create a social framework containing infinite autonomous and self-reliant worlds."

From this possibility of self-determination even the notion of workers' self-management is seen as problematic since "Far from the emergence of proletarian power, ... this self-management as a moment of the self-harnessing of the workers to capitalist production in the period of real subsumption ... Mistaking the individual capitalist (who, in real subsumption disappears into the collective body of share ownership on one side, and hired management on the other) rather than the enterprise as the problem, ... the workers themselves became a collective capitalist, taking on responsibility for the exploitation of their own labor. Thus, far from breaking with 'work', ... the workers maintained the practice of clocking-in, continued to organize themselves and the community around the needs of the factory, paid themselves from profits arising from the sale of watches, maintained determined relations between individual work done and wage, and continued to wear their work shirts throughout the process."

André Gorz was an Austrian and French social philosopher. Also a journalist, he co-founded Le Nouvel Observateur weekly in 1964. A supporter of Jean-Paul Sartre's existentialist version of Marxism after World War Two, in the aftermath of the May '68 student riots, he became more concerned with political ecology. His central theme was wage labour issues such as liberation from work, the just distribution of work, social alienation, and a guaranteed basic income.

=== Anarchism ===
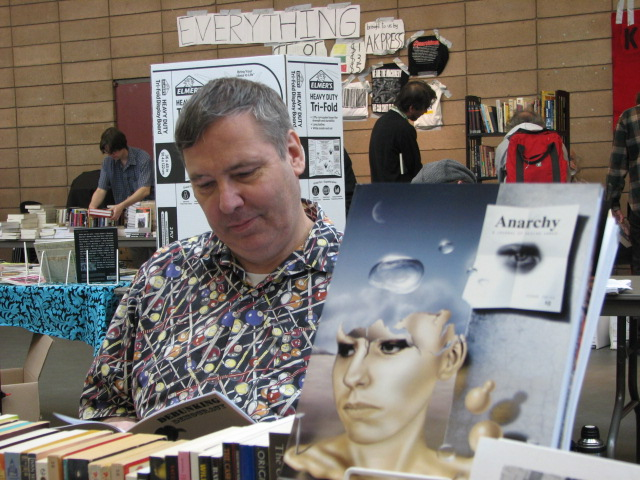
Bob Black, contemporary American anarchist associated with the post-left anarchy tendency

Bob Black's 1986 essay The Abolition of Work proposes a "life based on play" to replace work. He argues that work degrades workers through discipline and habituation, and equates work to social control and mass murder.

In 2022, Green Theory & Praxis Journal published a Total Liberation Pathway which involved "an abolition of compulsory work for all beings".

== Stigmatization of people who do not work ==
Those who engage in refusal of work break one of the most powerful social norms of contemporary society. Hence they frequently receive harassment from people, sometimes irrespective of whether they made the choice to leave work behind or not. In Nazi Germany the so-called "work-shy" individuals were rounded up and imprisoned in Nazi concentration camps as black triangle prisoners in the so-called "Aktion Arbeitsscheu Reich".

=== Other derogatory terms and their history ===
==== Cynic philosophical school ====
Cynicism (Greek: κυνισμός), in its original form, refers to the beliefs of an ancient school of Greek philosophers known as the Cynics (Greek: Κυνικοί, Latin: Cynici). Their philosophy was that the purpose of life was to live a life of Virtue in agreement with Nature. This meant rejecting all conventional desires for wealth, power, health, and fame, and by living a simple life free from all possessions. They believed that the world belonged equally to everyone, and that suffering was caused by false judgments of what was valuable and by the worthless customs and conventions which surrounded society.

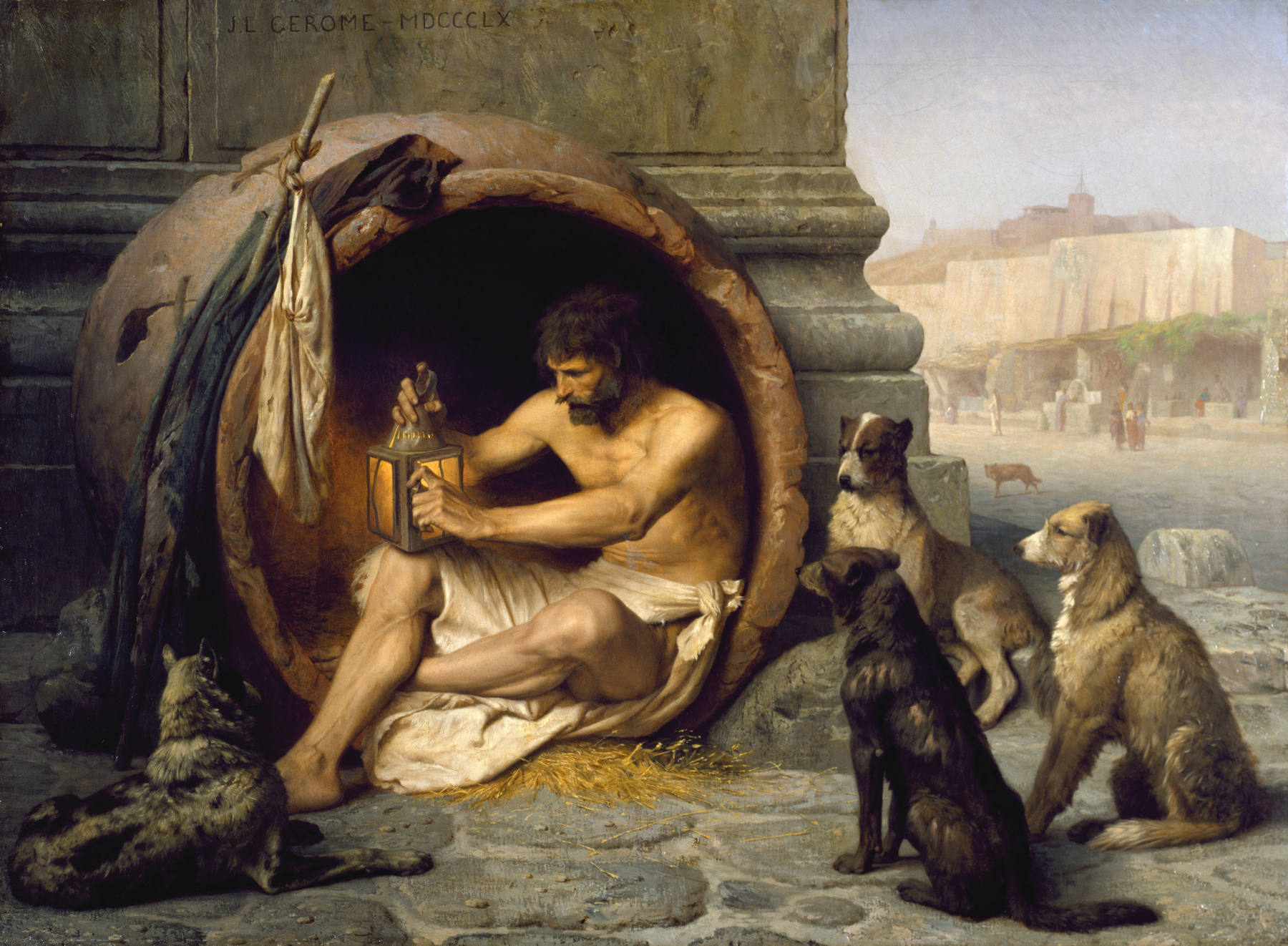
Diogenes of Sinope – depicted by Jean-Léon Gérôme

The first philosopher to outline these themes was Antisthenes, who had been a pupil of Socrates in the late 5th century BCE. He was followed by Diogenes of Sinope, who lived in a tub on the streets of Athens. Diogenes took Cynicism to its logical extremes, and came to be seen as the archetypal Cynic philosopher. He was followed by Crates of Thebes who gave away a large fortune so he could live a life of Cynic poverty in Athens. Cynicism spread with the rise of Imperial Rome in the 1st century, and Cynics could be found begging and preaching throughout the cities of the Empire. It finally disappeared in the late 5th century, although many of its ascetic and rhetorical ideas were adopted by early Christianity. The name Cynic derives from the Greek word κυνικός, kynikos, 'dog-like' and that from κύων, kyôn, 'dog' (genitive: kynos).

It seems certain that the word dog was also thrown at the first Cynics as an insult for their shameless rejection of conventional manners, and their decision to live on the streets. Diogenes, in particular, was referred to as the Dog.

==== "Slackers" ====
The term slacker is commonly used to refer to a person who avoids work (especially British English), or (primarily in North American English) an educated person who is viewed as an underachiever.

While use of the term slacker dates back to about 1790 or 1898 depending on the source, it gained some recognition during the British Gezira Scheme, when Sudanese labourers protested their relative powerlessness by working lethargically, a form of protest known as 'slacking'. The term achieved a boost in popularity after its use in the films Back to the Future and Slacker.

==== NEET ====
NEET is an acronym for the government classification for people currently "Not in Employment, Education or Training". It was first used in the United Kingdom but its use has spread to other countries, including the United States, Japan, China, and South Korea.

In the United Kingdom, the classification comprises people aged between 16 and 24 (some 16-year-olds are still of compulsory education age). In Japan, the classification comprises people aged between 15 and 34 who are unemployed, unmarried, not enrolled in school or engaged in housework, and not seeking work or the technical training needed for work. The "NEET group" is not a uniform set of individuals but consists of those who will be NEET for a short time while essentially testing out a variety of opportunities and those who have major and often multiple issues and are at long term risk of remaining disengaged.

In Brazil, "nem-nem" (short of nem estudam nem trabalham (neither study nor work) is a term with similar meaning.

In Spanish-speaking countries, "ni-ni" (short of ni estudia ni trabaja) is also applied.

==== "Freeters" and parasite singles ====
Freeter (フリーター, furītā) (other spellings below) is a Japanese expression for people between the age of 15 and 34 who lack full-time employment or are unemployed, excluding homemakers and students. They may also be described as underemployed or freelance workers. These people do not start a career after high school or university but instead usually live as so-called parasite singles with their parents and earn some money with low-skilled and low-paid jobs.

The word freeter or freeta was first used around 1987 or 1988 and is thought to be an amalgamation of the English word free (or perhaps freelance) and the German word Arbeiter ("worker").

Parasite single (パラサイトシングル, parasaito shinguru) is a Japanese term for a single person who lives with their parents until their late twenties or early thirties in order to enjoy a carefree and comfortable life. In English, the expression "sponge" or "basement dweller" may sometimes be used.

The expression is mainly used in reference to Japanese society, but similar phenomena can also be found in other countries worldwide. In Italy, 30-something singles still relying on their mothers are joked about, being called Bamboccioni (literally: grown-up babies) and in Germany they are known as Nesthocker (German for an altricial bird), who are still living at Hotel Mama.

Such behaviour is considered normal in Greece, both because of the traditional strong family ties and because of the low wages.

==== Welfare queens ====
A welfare queen is a derogatory term for a person, almost exclusively female and usually a single mother, who lives primarily from welfare and other public assistance funds. The term implies that the person collects welfare, charity, or other handouts either fraudulently or excessively and that the person intentionally chooses to live "on the dole" as opposed to seeking gainful employment, ostensibly due to laziness.

==== Vagrancy ====
A vagrant is derogatory term for a person in a situation of poverty, who wanders from place to place without a home or regular employment or income. Many towns in the developed world have shelters for vagrants. Common terminology is a tramp or a 'gentleman of the road'.

Laws against vagrancy in the United States have partly been invalidated as violative of the due process clauses of the U.S. Constitution. However, the FBI report on crime in the United States for 2005 lists 24,359 vagrancy violations.

==== "Hobos", "tramps", and "bums" ====
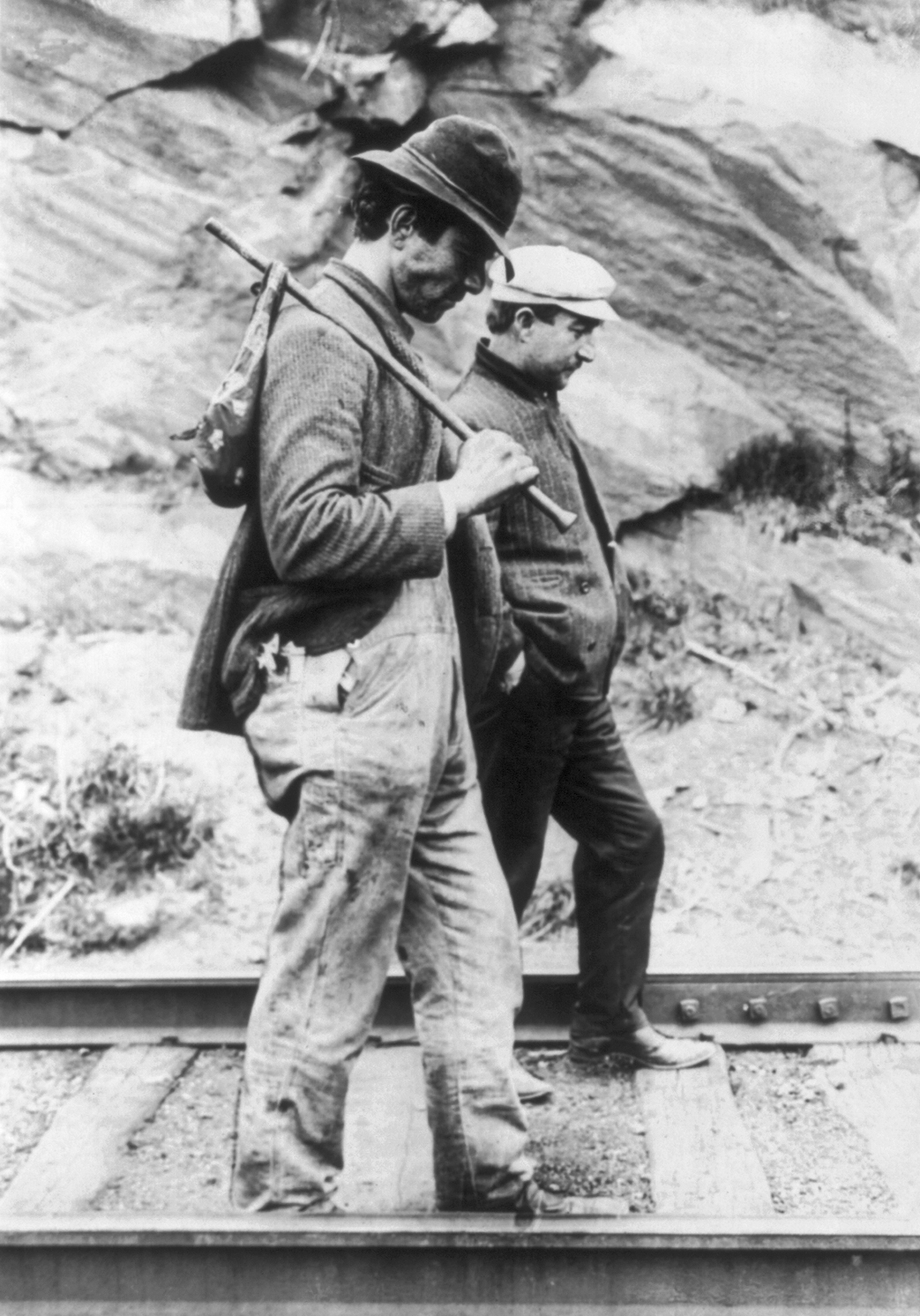
Two hobos walking along railroad tracks, after being put off a train. One is carrying a bindle.

A hobo is a migratory worker or homeless vagabond, often penniless. The term originated in the western—probably northwestern—United States during the last decade of the 19th century. Unlike tramps, who worked only when they were forced to, and bums, who did not work at all, hobos were workers who wandered.

In British English and traditional American English usage, a tramp is a long-term homeless person who travels from place to place as an itinerant vagrant, traditionally walking or hiking all year round.

While some tramps may do odd jobs from time to time, unlike other temporarily homeless people they do not seek out regular work and support themselves by other means such as begging or scavenging. This is in contrast to:

- bum, a stationary homeless person who does not work, and who begs or steals for a living in one place.
- hobo, a homeless person who travels from place to place looking for work, often by "freighthopping", illegally catching rides on freight trains
- Schnorrer, a Yiddish term for a person who travels from city to city begging.

Both terms, "tramp" and "hobo" (and the distinction between them), were in common use between the 1880s and the 1940s. Their populations and the usage of the terms increased during the Great Depression.

Like "hobo" and "bum", the word "tramp" is considered vulgar in American English usage, having been subsumed in more polite contexts by words such as "homeless person". In colloquial American English, the word "tramp" can also mean a sexually promiscuous female or even prostitute. Tramps used to be known euphemistically in England and Wales as "gentlemen of the road".

Tramp is derived from the Middle English as a verb meaning to "walk with heavy footsteps", and to go hiking. Bart Kennedy, a self-described tramp of 1900 U.S., once said "I listen to the tramp, tramp of my feet, and wonder where I was going, and why I was going."

== See also ==
- Arbeit macht frei
- Automation
- Bullshit Jobs
- Counterculture
- Critique of political economy
- Critique of work
- Decent work
- Disability fraud
- Drapetomania
- Ergophobia
- Frisch elasticity of labor supply
- Great Resignation
- Gutter punk
- Hunter-gatherer
- Interpassivity
- Post-work society
- Quiet quitting
- r/antiwork
- Slacker
- Tang ping ("lying flat")
- Unfree labour
- Universal basic income
- Work ethic
- Work–life balance
- Workism

== Literature ==
- George M. Alliger: Anti-Work: Psychological Investigations Into Its Truths, Problems, and Solutions, ISBN 978-0367758592, 2022.
