= Romano Alquati =

Italian sociologist (1935–2010)

- Born: 11 February 1935; Klana, Province of Fiume, Kingdom of Italy
- Died: 3 April 2010 (aged 75); Turin, Italy
- Occupations: Sociologist, political theorist, activist

Romano Alquati (11 February 1935 – 3 April 2010) was an Italian sociologist, political theorist and activist. He was known for his work for Operaist journal Quaderni Rossi and his Marxist analysis of labour practices at Italian companies FIAT and Olivetti.

== Early life ==
Alquati was born in 1935 in Klana, Province of Fiume, where his father, army general Carlo Alquati, had been exiled because of his left-wing stance within the Italian Fascist party. When Alquati was 10, his father was executed by partisans in Vercelli in northern Italy. Alquati grew up in Cremona, where he shaped his political consciousness through meeting left-wing political militants, including Danilo Montaldi.

== Activism ==
Before moving to Turin, he lived in Milan, at the political commune at via Sirtori 2.

He moved to Turin when he was 25, where he joined the editorial staff of the political journal Quaderni Rossi alongside Raniero Panzieri, and in 1963 founded the journal Classe Operaia ('Working Class') with Mario Tronti and Antonio Negri.

Alquati's work studying labour practices in the Fiat factory in Turin was an early contribution to the sociology of work in Italy. He was influenced by the methodology of Danilo Montaldi and the barefoot researchers: he worked at the factories he was studying and lived with other workers. In this way, Alquati studied labour practices at the FIAT Mirafiori factory and at an Olivetti factory. His work stressed the nuances of and differences in the working class, and contributed to the idea of class composition developed by Operaist thinkers.

== Academic career ==
In the early 1970s, Alquati left the factories to teach in universities, and continued to teach throughout the 1980s. His work anticipated deindustrialisation and the emergence of the service sector. During this period, his political thought diverged from earlier allies such as Toni Negri and Mario Tronti. He produced a study of the relationship of universities to the working class, and taught a course on the subject at the University of Turin until 2003.

His academic work focused on globalisation and its possible alternatives; the thought of Zygmunt Bauman on the liquid society; and women's history and politics.

== Bibliography ==
- Alquati, Romano (1975). Sulla FIAT e altri scritti. Milan: Feltrinelli.
- Alquati, Romano (1977). Sindacato e partito : antologia di interventi di sindacalisti sul rapporto fra sindacato e sistema politico in Italia. Turin: Stampatori.
- Alquati, Romano; Negri, Nicola; Sormano, Andrea (1978). Università di ceto medio e proletariato intellettuale. Turin: Stampatori.
- Alquati, Romano; Soave, Sergio (1979). Il mondo giovanile : politica, famiglia, lavoro, cultura. Turin: Stampatori.
- Alquati, Romano (1980). Terrorismo verso la Seconda Repubblica?. Turin: Stampatori.
- Alquati, Romano (1989). Dispense di sociologia industriale. Turin: Il segnalibro.
- Alquati, Romano (1994). Camminando per realizzare un sogno comune. Turin: Velleità alternative.
- Alquati, Romano (1997). Lavoro e attività : per una analisi della schiavitù neomoderna. Rome: Manifestolibri.
