= Raniero Panzieri =

Italian politician (1921–1964)

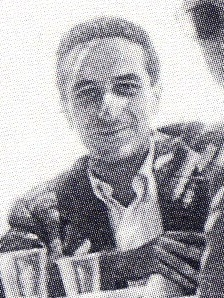
- Panzieri in 1951
- Born: 14 February 1921; Rome, Italy
- Died: 9 October 1964 (aged 43); Turin, Italy
- Political party: Italian Socialist Party (1944–1959)

Education
- Education: University of Urbino
- Thesis: L'utopia rivoluzionaria nel Settecento. Il «Code de la Nature» (1945)
- Doctoral advisor: Arturo Massolo

Philosophical work
- Era: 20th-century philosophy
- Region: Western philosophy
- School: Operaismo Autonomous Marxism

Raniero Panzieri (14 February 1921 – 9 October 1964) was an Italian politician, writer and Marxist theoretician, considered as the founder of operaismo.

== Biography ==
Raniero Panzieri was born in Rome in 1921. In 1944, he became involved with the Italian Socialist Party, then, moving to Sicily in the late 1940s, he began taking an active part in struggles for land reform. In 1945, he completed his law degree at the University of Urbino under Arutro Massolo. In 1948, he briefly began teaching at the University of Messina, but soon decided to leave so he could prioritize participation in workers' movements. In 1953, he became a member of the central committee of the PSI; he assumed the post of Cultural Secretary a year later. In 1957, became the co-director of the theoretical review Mondo operaio (Workers World), which he turned into a discussion forum for the left of the party. During this period, he criticized how party bureaucracy stiflied critique, arguing that Italian Marxism's failures resulted from false equations of party hierarchy, class and correctness, and that their primary goal should be to restore "permanent critique". He further criticized the trend of Italian Marxism towards sole participation in parliament without adequate participation from the working class, and advocated for the establishment of full democratic control over the party by workers. Alongside his criticisms, he also translated Volume II of Karl Marx's Capital into Italian, assisted by his wife, Pucci Saija.

At the 1959 congress of the Italian Socialist Party, Panzieri opposed the creation of a governmental accord with Christian Democracy, and was removed from heading Mondo operaio amid the conflict. Although Panzieri had been re-elected to the Central Committee, his ideas continued to conflict with those of the Party. He then moved to Turin, where he worked for the Einaudi publishing house, and, influenced by the French group Socialisme ou Barbarie, he founded the Quaderni Rossi (Red Notebooks) review, together with Mario Tronti, Romano Alquati and Danilo Montald, where he served as chief editor. He forged links with several groups of militant trade unionists, socialists and dissident communists.

In the industrial revolt of the piazza Statuto in 1962 in Turin, Panzieri saw the emergence of the central role of the factory and the (factory) worker. The first editions of the review, which aimed at exploring the real life of the factory and the relationship of the workers to production, had a profound impact in the sphere of workplace struggles, as they departed from the habitual positions of the socialists and communists in this area. Mario Tronti would split off in 1963 to form the review Classe Operaia (Italian: Working Class). This review was the cradle of operaismo (workerism), a Marxist tendency popular in Italy in the 1960s. Panzieri was praised by the magazine as "among the countless leaders of the organised movement only one had consciously chosen the path of his own defeat, because this led towards the working class." Panzieri died in Turin, aged 43.

== Bibliography ==
- "Socialist uses of workers' enquiry"
- "Seven Theses on Workers' Control (1958)"
- "Surplus value and planning: notes on the reading of Capital"

== Sources ==
- Ferrero P. (ed.), Raniero Panzieri: un uomo di frontiera, Editions Punto Rosso, 330 p.
