= Quaderni Rossi =

Marxist magazine in Italy (1961–1966)

Quaderni Rossi (Italian for "Red Notebooks") was an Italian political journal founded in 1961 which became one of the primary sources of autonomist Marxism. The journal had a pro-Chinese stance. Its first issue appeared on 30 September 1961. Raniero Panzieri played a central role in founding the journal alongside Mario Tronti, Romano Alquati, Antonio (Toni) Negri, Alberto Asor Rosa, and Danilo Montaldi. In August 1963, Classe Operaia, led by Tronti, broke away, leaving a group around Panzieri and Vittorio Rieser running Quaderni Rossi. Following the death of Panzieri in 1964, the journal continued until 1966 but without the same impact as it had previously enjoyed.
