= Alberto Asor Rosa =

Italian critic, historian and politician (1933–2022)

Alberto Asor Rosa (23 September 1933 – 21 December 2022) was an Italian literary critic, historian, and politician, born in Rome. He was an Italian Communist Party (PCI) member of the Chamber of Deputies from 1979 to 1980. Rosa was among the contributors to the leftist magazine Quaderni piacentini in the mid-1960s. He coedited another magazine entitled Classe Operaia with Mario Tronti from its start in 1964 to 1966. Rosa was the last editor of Rinascita, PCI's theoretical journal. He died in Rome on 21 December 2022, at the age of 89.
