= Logic as a Positive Science =

1950 book by Galvano Della Volpe

- Author: Galvano Della Volpe
- Original title: Logica come Scienza positiva
- Translator: Jon Rothschild
- Language: Italian
- Publication date: 1950
- Publication place: Italy

Logic as a Positive Science (Italian: Logica come Scienza positiva) is one of the major works of Italian Marxist philosopher Galvano Della Volpe. It was first published in 1950 as Logica come Scienza positiva. A second edition appeared in 1956 and according to translator, Jon Rothschild, Della Volpe was reportedly working on a third edition at the time of his death in 1968 which was never completed. The definitive, enlarged edition was published posthumously in 1969 under the slightly different title Logica Come Scienza Storica. Jon Rothschild translated the book into English for New Left Books (now Verso), and was first published by them as Logic as a Positive Science in 1980.

== Summary ==
The book's thesis is that the progress made in philosophy has come out of struggles against apriorist idealism. Della Volpe provides several case studies of such critiques of apriorism including Plato's critique of Parmenides, Aristotle's critique of Plato, Galileo's critique of scholastic science, Kant's critique of Leibniz's rationalism, and the young Marx's critique of Hegelian idealism.

Della Volpe used those case studies in order to defend the thesis that Marxism is a science to the extent that it relies upon a Galilean methodology, not unlike the one that he saw as underlying the natural sciences. For Della Volpe, Capital is the best exemplification of this moral Galileanism in practice, with Marx exploding the apriorist reasonings of the classical economists, which involved reliance upon 'speculative' or 'forced' abstractions that implied the existence of natural and eternal economic laws. Instead, Marx followed a methodology that relied upon determinate abstractions. Della Volpe analyzed Marx's methodology as one which followed the pattern of Concrete-Abstract-Concrete (C-A-C), which is the pattern or circle of scientific materialist dialectics (as opposed to Hegelian dialectics which, according to Della Volpe, follows the circle of Abstract-Concrete-Abstract).

In developing this analysis of Marx, Della Volpe advanced an understanding of the logic of scientific verification that was not unlike the one that Karl Popper presented in his Logic of Scientific Discovery. However, it would seem that Della Volpe did not rely upon Popper in developing his analysis but instead relied on such writers as Galileo, Lord Bacon, Claude Bernard, John Dewey, and Friedrich Engels. Whereas, Popper was concerned in The Logic of Scientific Discovery with providing solutions to the demarcation problem (i.e. rules for distinguishing science from non-science) and the induction problem, Della Volpe was concerned mainly with demonstrating that the "moral sciences" follow the same logic as the natural or positive sciences, and with showing that Marx had likewise embraced what Della Volpe called a "moral Galileanism." By implication, this could be taken as rebutting Popper's thesis that Marxism is not scientific. In Italy, this book was seen by many as providing a scientific alternative to the Gramscian Marxism which the Communist Party of Italy (among others) had claimed as its guide.
