= Hot Autumn =

1969–70 strikes in Northern Italy

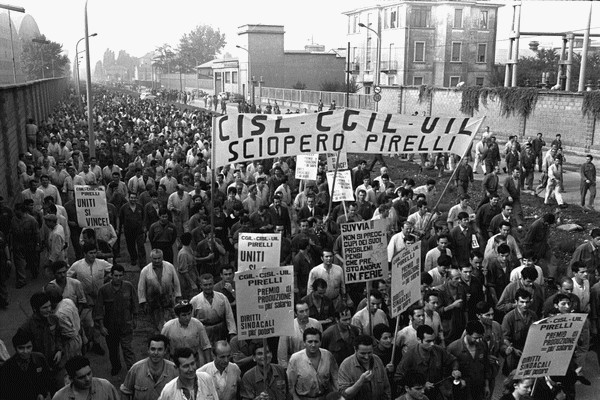
Pirelli workers protesting in Milan

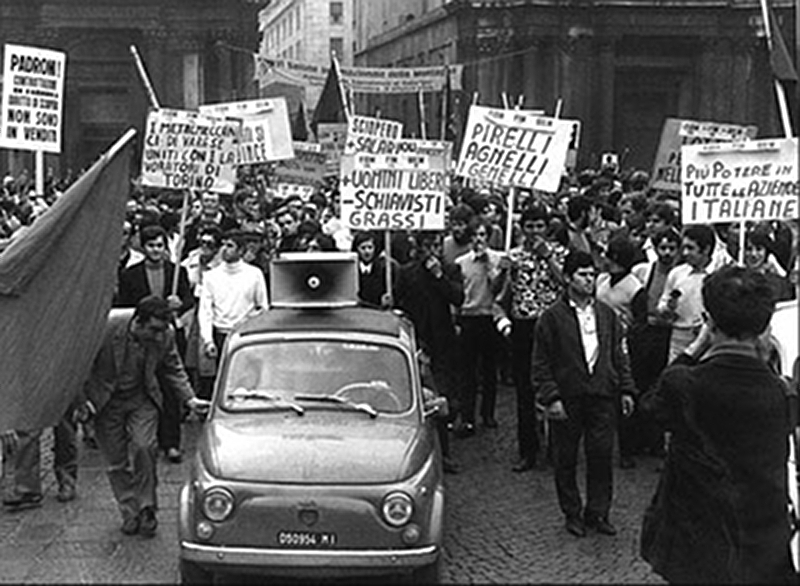
A protest in Turin

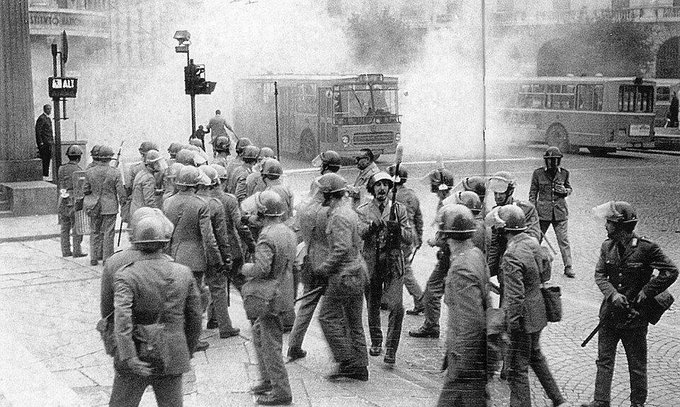
A protest in Bergamo

The Hot Autumn (Italian: Autunno caldo) of 1969–70 is a term used for a series of large strikes in the factories and industrial centers of Northern Italy, in which workers demanded better pay and better conditions. During 1969 and 1970 there were over 440 hours of strikes in the region. The decrease in the flow of labour migration from Southern Italy had resulted in nearly full employment levels in the northern part of the country, meaning that the workforce there now had the leverage to start exercising its influence.

== Overview ==
Due to increased literacy levels in general and especially among workers, following a wave of student protests influenced by similar events in May 1968 in France, leftist students started agitating for social reforms and increased class consciousness. Workers joined in on these protests and began to demand increased wages. Many of them were being laid off because of increased efficiencies in factories. Not all of the workers' demands for collective control came about, but more basic demands such as a 40-hour work week and increased pay were achieved.

The reasons for discontent varied - while the usual demands for better pay and working conditions were a factor, the tensions were also increased by the fact that much of the workforce had migrated from the much poorer South. They were generally unhappy at the society that had forced them to leave their homes in search of work, and wanted to get back at the employers who, in their view, had been exploiting them with lower than average wages for so many years.

The phrase autunno caldo has since been applied in the Italian press to describe other periods marked by significant strikes, although in later decades such seasonal strikes have more often been directed against the government's budget plans, which are usually planned and publicly debated during the autumn months.

== Origins ==
The period known as the "Hot Autumn" in Italy began in the summer of 1968, which saw a series of strikes as workers demanded a flat-rate pay rise. The unrest that lasted from 1966 to 1972 began in the universities. These student movements set a precedent with their use of disruptive forms of protest which included strikes, demonstrations, and occupation of university buildings. Students formed assemblies where the assembly was not only a mass meeting, but a body that made binding decisions. This student movement eventually shifted from university issues and moved toward industrial struggles. Examples of the shift to industrial struggles can be seen through the protests that occurred in the car factories of Turin in 1969.

Turin was the center of FIAT factories, and became the focus of continual wildcat strikes. Workers were supported by university students of the New Left, and demanded wage increases and the same conditions as white-collar workers within the company. The protests were also a scene of major violence as some protests drew the hostility of the police. A strike against high rents outside the factory gates in Corso Traiano was attacked by the police and incidents like this led to a running battle with the police.

These protests were also influenced by the PCI, and often changed from Leninist to autonomist and operaista or from parties to activist networks. The "Hot Autumn" was followed by the "Years of Lead", which was a period of far-right and far-left violence including bombings, shootings and kidnappings.

== Context ==
The Hot Autumn occurred at a time of major weakness within the Italian government. The Christian Democracy had been in office for 20 years. During the latter stages of that time period, there was an overall degeneration, as people looked to vote for politicians who could give them favors, as the party could not be voted out. This overall clientelism within the Italian government led to both corruption and ineffective governance. The issues of the "Hot Autumn" can also be tied to the Confederazione Italiana dei Sindacati Lavoratori (Italian Confederation of Workers' Trade Unions, or CISL). The CISL was based on two principles, which were the importance of firm-level union activity, and the professionalization of union activists.

By the 1970s and 1980s, it can be seen that the CISL was a bureaucratic and politicized organization. It was tied to factions of the Christian Democratic Party, where the passing of favors was how the Italian government was run. Economic problems also surrounded the formation and fallout of the "Hot Autumn" period. In the six years following 1969 there was a massive redistribution of income, and the share of GNP accruing to dependent labor went from 57 to 73 percent. Redistributing that income led to increased consumption and reduced savings and this was a problem already in debt. The "Hot Autumn" protests started at the university, but their transition to the industrial stage pointed out the weak governance of the first republic, for economic policies were ineffective and sparked many of the frustrations of the blue-collar working class.

== See also ==
- Years of Lead
- Workerism
- Autonomism
- Lotta Continua
- Potere Operaio
- Autobiography of a generation, Luisa Passerini

Similar periods in other countries around the same time:

- The long hot summer of 1967 in the United States
- Protests of 1968
  - The May 1968 events in France
- The Winter of Discontent in 1978–79 in the United Kingdom
- Außerparlamentarische Opposition and German student movement in West Germany
  - see also Red Army Faction
  - German Autumn
