= Social factory =

Concept in autonomist Marxism

The Social factory is a concept developed in Italy in the 1960s to help analyse how capitalist social relations had expanded outside the sphere of production to that of society as a whole. The Autonomist Marxist Mario Tronti was one of the first theorists to develop the idea in his text Factory and Society (1962). Here Tronti uses the Marxist distinction between absolute and relative surplus value to explain how technical and social processes of late capitalist society become entwined, so that "the whole of society lives as a function of the factory and the factory extends its exclusive domination to the whole of society".

== Origins in Quaderni Rossi ==
Quaderni Rossi
