= Harry Cleaver =

American Marxist scholar (born 1944)

Harry Cleaver Jr.
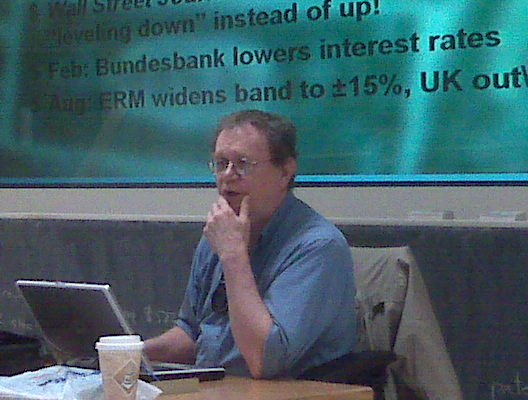
- Cleaver lecturing at the University of Texas at Austin
- Born: January 21, 1944 (age 82)
- Occupation: Professor emeritus
- Children: 3

Academic background
- Education: PhD
- Alma mater: Stanford University
- Thesis: The Origins of the Green Revolution (1975)
- Doctoral advisor: John G. Gurley

Academic work
- Discipline: Economics
- Sub-discipline: Marxian economics, Autonomist Marxism
- Institutions: University of Texas, Austin, The New School
- Notable works: Reading Capital Politically

Harry Cleaver Jr. (born 21 January 1944) is an American scholar, Marxist theoretician, and professor emeritus at the University of Texas at Austin. He is best known as the author of Reading Capital Politically, an autonomist reading of Karl Marx's Capital. Cleaver is currently active in the Zapatista movement in Chiapas, Mexico.

== Education ==
Cleaver began his undergraduate studies at Antioch College in 1962, graduating with a bachelor's degree in economics in 1967. At Antioch, Cleaver became involved in the American Civil Rights Movement and began his lifelong engagement with political activism. From 1964 to 1965, Cleaver studied abroad at the University of Montpellier where he engaged with the Union Nationale des Étudiants de France. In 1967, Cleaver enrolled at Stanford University to begin a PhD in economics. While at Stanford, Cleaver was active in the Anti-war Movement. As a student activist opposed to the Vietnam War, Cleaver protested the Stanford Research Institute's connection to the United States Department of Defense, which became the impetus for his dissertation research into the connections between the Green Revolution and social engineering. Cleaver's frustrations with mainstream economic theory during this period in his studies led him to embrace Marxism.

== Career ==
=== Teaching ===
In 1971, Cleaver was hired as an assistant professor at the Université de Sherbrooke in Montreal, Quebec where he taught for three years, finished his dissertation, and studied Québécois nationalism. From 1974 to 1976, Cleaver was a visiting assistant professor at the New School for Social Research in the department of economics. In 1976, Cleaver was hired by the economics department of the University of Texas at Austin to teach Marxism. By his own account, the appointment came about in response to some three years of campaigning by graduate students in the departments of economics and government. He remained at the university for 36 years, retiring in 2012. For more than twenty years he taught an annual graduate course (Eco 387L) on Marxist theory based on the three volumes of Marx's Capital.

== Partial bibliography ==
=== Books ===
- Cleaver, Harry (2024). The Fragile Juggernaut: Marx & Engels on Capitalism, Class Struggle and Crisis. Brill. ISBN 978-90-04-70836-5.
- Cleaver, Harry (2019). 33 Lessons on Capital: Reading Marx Politically. London: Pluto Press. ISBN 978-0745339979.
- Cleaver, Harry (2017). Rupturing the Dialectic: The Struggle Against Work. Chico: AK Press. ISBN 978-1849352277.
- Cleaver, Harry (1979). Reading Capital Politically. Austin: University of Texas Press. ISBN 978-0292770157.

=== Articles ===
- Cleaver, Harry (1998). "The Zapatista Effect: The Internet and the Rise of an Alternative Political Fabric". Journal of International Affairs. 51 (2): 621–640. JSTOR 24357524. Author's published version.
- Cleaver, Harry (1996). "The "space" of cyberspace: Body politics, frontiers and enclosures". Women & Performance: A Journal of Feminist Theory. 9 (1): 239–247. doi:10.1080/07407709608571263.
- Cleaver, Harry (1994). "Kropotkin, Self-valorization And The Crisis Of Marxism" (PDF). Anarchist Studies (2): 119–135.
- Cleaver, Harry (1989). "Close the IMF, abolish debt and end development: a class analysis of the international debt crisis". Capital & Class. 13 (3): 17–50. doi:10.1177/030981688903900102. S2CID 154471376.
- Bell, Peter; Cleaver, Harry (1989). "Marx's crisis theory as a theory of class struggle". Research in Political Economy. 5 (5): 189–261.
- Cleaver, Harry (1977). "Malaria, the Politics of Public Health and the International Crisis". Review of Radical Political Economics. 9 (1): 81–103. doi:10.1177/048661347700900106. PMID 11615136. S2CID 42058137.
- Cleaver, Harry (September 4, 1976). "Political Economy of Malaria De-Control". Economic and Political Weekly. 11 (36): 1463–1473. JSTOR 4364910.
- Cleaver, Harry (March 27, 1976). "Internationalisation of Capital and Mode of Production in Agriculture". Economic and Political Weekly. 11 (13): A2–A5+A7–A16. JSTOR 4364488.
- Cleaver, Harry (1972). "The Contradictions of the Green Revolution". The American Economic Review. 62 (1/2): 177–186. JSTOR 1821541. Author's published version.
