= Classe Operaia =

Marxist magazine in Italy (1964–1967)

- Editor: Antonio Negri; Alberto Asor Rosa; Mario Tronti
- Categories: Political magazine
- Frequency: Monthly
- First issue: January 1964
- Final issue: March 1967
- Country: Italy
- Language: Italian

Classe Operaia (Italian for "Working Class") was a Marxist monthly magazine which was published in Italy for three years between 1964 and 1967. Its subtitle was "political monthly of the workers in struggle."

== History and profile ==
Classe Operaia was founded by a group of Marxist intellectuals who left another Marxist magazine entitled Quaderni Rossi. They planned to be involved in more direct political activity through Classe Operaia. The first issue of Classe Operaia came out in January 1964. Asor Rosa and Mario Tronti co-edited the magazine from its start in 1964 to 1966. One of the main contributors was philosopher Antonio Negri.

Target audience of Classe Operaia was the workers, and it was not only a theoretical publication, but also a practice-oriented publication. The magazine's debut editorial, "Lenin in Inghilterra" (Italian: Lenin in England), by Mario Tronti emphasized the need to change the Marxist tradition which included the modification the dominant perspective of the period. Such a change was reported to be related to first the working class and its struggles and to the capital and its development. In the same issue an analysis of the technicians of production was presented which has been still used in the workerist theory and practice. Its contributors claimed that the workers' strike at Fiat in Turin was so significant that it created a totally new revolutionary path in the Italian politics. The magazine praised the efforts of Raniero Panzieri to support the workers' movement.

The last issue of Classe Operaia appeared in March 1967. It was succeeded by another magazine Contropiano which was started in 1968.

In 1979 a Milan-based publishing house, Machina Libri, reproduced all issues of Classe Operaia.
