= Galvano Della Volpe =

Italian professor of philosophy

Galvano Della Volpe (24 September 1895 – 13 July 1968) was an Italian professor of philosophy and Marxist theorist.

== Life ==
Born on 24 September 1895 in Imola, in the then province of Bologna, Della Volpe served in the First World War and afterwards completed his studies at the University of Bologna. Della Volpe taught history and philosophy in a liceo in Ravenna and at the University of Bologna from 1925 to 1938, when he became chair of history and philosophy at the University of Messina, a post he held until his retirement in 1965. Della Volpe died on 13 July 1968 in Rome.

== Work ==
Initially an idealist philosopher in the tradition of Giovanni Gentile, by the early 1940s and after an engagement with empiricist philosophy he turned strongly against idealism. In Italy, Della Volpe's work was seen by many as a scientific alternative to the Gramscian Marxism which the Communist Party of Italy (among others) had claimed as its guide. He was critical of Gramsci in part because the latter's work was rooted philosophically in the thought of Gentile and Benedetto Croce. Della Volpe was also noted for his writings on aesthetics including writings on film theory. He was an atheist. His major contributions to logic, aesthetics, and political philosophy form a distinct school within Western Marxism, often referred to as "scientific Marxism."

One key aspect of Della Volpe's mature thought was his attempt to develop a strictly materialist theory of aesthetics as he emphasised the role of structural characteristics and the social process of production of works of art in the formation of aesthetic judgment in opposition to Croce's doctrine of intuition which he considered a continuation of the romantic and mystical tradition of the 19th century. He developed the concept of taste as the primary source of aesthetic judgment itself.

Della Volpe also wrote on issues of political philosophy, particularly the relations between the thought of Jean-Jacques Rousseau and Karl Marx. This allowed him to explore the relations between what he called the two freedoms of Enlightenment thought, namely the civic liberties of John Locke and Immanuel Kant which became embodied in bourgeois democracy and the egalitarian freedoms described in Rousseau’s Social Contract and the Discourse on Inequality. What particularly interested Della Volpe was the contrast of the formal equality of Kantian legal freedoms, indifferent to substantive social inequality between persons, with the proportional inequality of Rousseau's social contract as an egalitarian mediation between persons. He saw Rousseau's thought on these issues as being the precursor of Marx’s famous attacks on bourgeois law in the Critique of the Gotha Programme and other writings.

Some of his most notable works include:

- Critique of Taste (Verso Books, 1991).
- Logic as a Positive Science (Verso Books, 1980).
- Rousseau and Marx: And Other Writings (Lawrence and Wishart, 1987).
- Crisi dell'estetica romantica (1963)

Della Volpe had a number of students and disciples, including Ignazio Ambrogio, Umberto Cerroni, Lucio Colletti, Alessandro Mazzone, Nicolao Merker, Franco Moretti, Armando Plebe, Mario Rossi and Carlo Violi.

== Articles ==
- Della Volpe, Galvano. "The Marxist Critique of Rousseau". New Left Review I/59 (1970): 101–109.
- Della Volpe, Galvano. "Settling Accounts with the Russian Formalists". New Left Review I/113–114 (1979).
