= Mario Tronti =

Italian philosopher and politician (1931–2023)

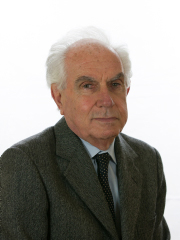
- Official portrait, 2013

Member of the Senate of the Republic
- In office 15 March 2013 – 23 March 2018
- Constituency: Lombardy
- In office 23 April 1992 – 14 April 1994
- Constituency: Lazio

Personal details
- Born: 24 July 1931 Rome, Italy
- Died: 7 August 2023 (aged 92) Ferentillo, Italy
- Party: PCI (until 1991); PDS (1991–1998); DS (1998–2007); PD (2007–2023)
- Education: Sapienza University of Rome
- Occupation: Academic, politician

Mario Tronti (24 July 1931 – 7 August 2023) was an Italian academic Marxist philosopher and politician. He is considered to be one of the key theorists for operaismo and autonomist Marxism in the 1960s. Mario Tronti taught philosophy at the University of Siena for more than three decades.

== Life and career ==
An active member of the Italian Communist Party (PCI) during the 1950s, he was, along with Raniero Panzieri, amongst the founders of the Quaderni Rossi (Red Notebooks) review from which he split in 1963 to establish the Classe Operaia (Working Class) review. This evolving journey progressively distanced him from the PCI, without him ever formally leaving, and engaged him in the radical experiences of operaismo. Such experience, considered by many to be the matrix of Italian autonomist Marxism in the 1960s, was characterised by challenging the roles of the traditional organisations of the workers' movement (the unions and the parties) and the direct engagement, without intermediaries, with the working class itself and to the struggles in the factories.

Influenced by the work of Galvano Della Volpe which led him to distance himself from the thinking of Antonio Gramsci, Tronti dedicated himself to the formulation of a politics basing theory on practice, which could renew traditional Marxism and contribute to re-opening the revolutionary road in the West.

Faced with mass revolt by Western workers in the 1960s, Tronti's operaismo was able to propose a modern analysis of class relations and above all, refocus attention of the subjective factor, claiming the central political role of the working class. His ideas found an echo in 1966, with the publication of Operai e capitale (Workers and Capital), a book that would exercise a notable influence on the protests of the youth and more generally, on the wave of mobilisation that was initiated in the following years. Tronti served as a member of the PCI Central Committee in the 1980s.

Tronti died on 7 August 2023, at the age of 92.

== Publications ==
- Tra materialismo dialettico e filosofia della prassi. Gramsci e Labriola, in A. Caracciolo et G. Scalia (éd.), La città futura. Saggi sulla figura e il pensiero di Antonio Gramsci, Feltrinelli, Milano, 1959
- (éd.), Scritti inediti di economia politica di Marx, Editori Riuniti, Roma, 1963
- Baldi, Camillo, in A.M. Ghisalberti (éd.), Dizionario Biografico degli Italiani 5, Istituto dell'Enciclopedia Italiana, Roma, 1963
- Operai e capitale, Einaudi, Torino, 1966 (DeriveApprodi, Roma, 2006)
- Hegel politico, Istituto dell'Enciclopedia italiana, Roma, 1975
- Sull'autonomia del politico, Feltrinelli, Milano, 1977
- Stato e rivoluzione in Inghilterra, Il Saggiatore, Milano, 1977
- (en collab. avec G. Napolitano, A. Accornero et M. Cacciari), Operaismo e centralità operaia, Editori Riuniti, Roma, 1978
- (éd.), Il politico. Antologia di testi del pensiero politico. 1 : Da Machiavelli a Cromwell, Feltrinelli, Milano, 1979
- Soggetti, crisi, potere, A. Piazzi et A. De Martinis (éd.), Cappelli, Bologna, 1980;
- Il tempo della politica, Editori Riuniti, Roma, 1980
- Con le spalle al futuro. Per un altro dizionario politico, Editori Riuniti, Roma, 1992;
- Berlinguer. Il Principe disarmato, Edizioni Sisifo, Roma, 1994
- La politica al tramonto, Einaudi, Torino, 1998
- Rileggendo "La libertà comunista", in G. Liguori (éd.), Galvano Della Volpe. Un altro marxismo, Edizioni Fahrenheit 451, Roma, 2000
- (éd. avec P. Favilli), Classe operaia. Le identità : storia e prospettiva, Angeli, Milano, 2001
- Cenni di Castella, Edizioni Cadmo, Fiesole, 2001
- Per la critica della democrazia politica, in M. Tari (éd.), Guerra e democrazia, ManifestoLibri, Roma, 2005
- Id. et al., Politica e destino, Sossella editore, Roma, 2006 (avec les contributions de divers auteurs sur la pensée de Mario Tronti)
- Il proprio tempo appreso col pensiero, 2024
