= Danilo Montaldi =

Danilo Montaldi (1 July 1929 – 27 April 1975) was an Italian writer, intellectual and Marxist activist, who participated in the Autonomist Marxism movement.

== Biography ==
Montaldi was born in Cremona in 1929. His father, Nino Montaldi, was a working-class anarchist who was jailed for two years during the fascist regime. Following his release from prison, he was placed under close surveillance by the fascist authorities and was unable to regain his position with the Italian railways. Thus Montaldi's mother, Clelia Nolli Montaldi, became the sole earner supporting the family. The autobiography of Nino Montaldi was published as El Nino in Montaldi's second volume of biographies, Militanti politici di base (1971). In 1944, Danilo Montaldi joined the Fronte della Gioventù and participated in the Italian resistance movement. Following the overthrow of fascism, Montaldi was briefly a member of the Italian Communist Party, but left owing to their reformism and dogmatism. During the 1950s, Montaldi developed links with a diverse range of individuals and organisations involved in far-left politics, such as Socialisme ou Barbarie (Socialism or Barbarity) in France and others in Germany, England and the United States. He also published his material in a broad range of journals such as Discussioni, Nuovi Argomenti, Ragionamenti, Opinione, and Passato e Presente.

Between 1960 and 1964, Montaldi worked as a commissioning editor for Giangiacomo Feltrinelli Editore, the Milan publishing house founded by Giangiacomo Feltrinelli, of whom he was a close collaborator during those years. At the same time, he began to publish his own books. In 1960, Feltrinelli published Montaldi's first book, Milano, Corea. Inchiesta sugli immigrati (Milan, Korea. Investigation into immigrants), co-written with Franco Alasia. This book compiled and analyzed testimonies from immigrants in Milan, highlighting the then-understudied phenomenon of immigration. Following this, Montaldi dedicated his work to collecting life stories, a field in which his contributions are considered groundbreaking, at least in Italy. His 1961 work, Autobiografie della leggera (Turin, Einaudi), now a classic of its kind, narrates the life stories of individuals on the very fringes of society, including dissidents, partisans, small-time criminals, and prostitutes, narrated in their own words and vernacular. This was succeeded by Militanti politici di base (Turin, Einaudi, 1971), which focused on political militants and resistance fighters. These two works were intended as the initial two chapters of a comprehensive investigation into the culture of the lower classes in the lower Po Valley. Montaldi was working on the third chapter, which was to explore the lives of peasants, at the time of his passing.

In 1965, together with some friends, he opened the Renzo Botti Art Gallery in Cremona, where, for over a decade, some of the most significant works by contemporary, international artist were presented. During that same period, he was also involved in the making of several documentaries, one of which he directed himself, La Matàna de Po (1959).

While continuing his collaboration with publishers such as Feltrinelli, Einaudi, Rizzoli, Mondadori and Il Saggiatore, over the next decade, he focused primarily on his own research and publications, moving away also from political activism, until his premature death in Val Roia in 1975, in circumstances that have never been fully clarified.

== Works ==
- Milano, Corea: Inchiesta sugli immigrati, (Milan, Korea: An Investigation into Immigration), Feltrinelli, 1960, (reprinted as an expanded edition by Feltrinelli in 1975 and by Donzelli in 2010)
- Autobiografie della leggera, (Autobiographies of the Leggera), Einaudi, 1961, (2nd edition by Einaudi in 1974, then reprinted by Bompiani in 1998, 2012 and 2018)
- Militanti politici di base, (Autobiographies of political militants), Einaudi, 1971, (reprinted by CremonaBooks in 2025)
- Korsch e i comunisti italiani, (Korsch and Italian Communism), Samonà e Savelli, 1975
- Saggio sulla politica comunista in Italia – 1919-1970, (Essay on the communist politics in Italy – 1919–1970), Quaderni Piacentini, 1976, (reprinted by Colibrì Edizioni in 2016)
- Renzo Botti. I disegni della raccolta Montaldi, (Writings on the painter Renzo Botti), Anali della Biblioteca Statale di Cremona, 1989
- Bisogna Sognare. Scritti 1952 - 1975, (Uncollected Writings, Articles and Essays), Colibrì Edizioni/ Centro Luca Rossi, 1994
- Lettere 1963 - 1975. Danilo Montaldi e Giuseppe Guerreschi, (The collected letters between Montaldi and the painter Guerreschi), Edizioni Linograf, Anali della Biblioteca Statale di Cremona, 2000
