= 1977 in Italy =

- Decades: 1950s; 1960s; 1970s; 1980s; 1990s
- See also: History of Italy; Timeline of Italian history; List of years in Italy

Events during the year 1977 in Italy

== Incumbents ==
- President – Giovanni Leone
- Prime Minister – Giulio Andreotti (→ Third Andreotti government)

== Events ==
- 18 January – Footballer Luciano Re Cecconi killed during prank robbery of jewelry shop in Rome.
- January – Abortion in Italy: Chamber of Deputies passes, 310 to 296 votes, an abortion bill.
- 1 February – Suspiria, supernatural horror film by Dario Argento released.
- 17 February – Movement of 1977: Luciano Lama, secretary-general of the CGIL, the trade union closest to the Italian Communist Party, gave a speech inside the occupied Sapienza University of Rome; there was a clash with members of Autonomia Operaia and Lama was chased away ("The expulsion of Lama from La Sapienza university").
- 3 to 5 March – Sanremo Music Festival 1977, first one held in Teatro Ariston; group Homo Sapiens wins with the song "Bella da morire"
- 8 March – Emilio Colombo is president of the European Parliament (until July 1979).
- 11 March – Violent street clashes in Bologna: Francesco Lorusso of far-left militant organisation Lotta Continua was shot dead by carabinieri. (→ Years of Lead)
- 28 April – Fulvio Croce, a lawyer appointed to defend leaders of Red Brigades, was killed by The Red Brigades in Turin.
- 12 May – Death of Giorgiana Masi during a protest in Rome.
- 22 May – 1976–77 Serie A ends: Juventus wins 17th title.
- 7 June – Senate votes down, 156 to 154, an abortion bill.
- August – Herbert Kappler, a war criminal, escapes from a prison hospital with the help of his wife - she carried him out in a large suitcase.
- 11 October – Treaty of Osimo (1975) is effective: definitive delimitation with Yugoslavia.
- Disability in Italy: Law 517/1977 closes schools containing only children with disabilities (called "special schools").

== Births ==
- 15 January – Giorgia Meloni, Prime Minister of Italy
- 26 April – Samantha Cristoforetti, first Italian woman in space
- 26 May – Luca Toni, footballer
- 27 May – Francesco Romoli, photographer
- 31 May – Domenico Fioravanti, swimmer
- 12 August – Paola Mosca Barberis, alpine skier
- 13 October – Antonio Di Natale, footballer, football coach
- 30 October – Valentina Romeo, cartoonist, illustrator, and billiards player
- 19 December – Elisa, singer, songwriter and record producer

== Deaths ==
- 3 June – Roberto Rossellini, film director, screenwriter and producer (b. 1906)
- 1 November – Franco Albini, architect, designer and university instructor (b. 1905)
- Lazzaro Donati, painter (b. 1926)

== See also ==
- List of Italian films of 1977
- 1977 in Italian television
- List of number-one hits of 1977 (Italy)
