= 1978 in Italy =

- Decades: 1950s; 1960s; 1970s; 1980s; 1990s
- See also: History of Italy; Timeline of Italian history; List of years in Italy

Events during the year 1978 in Italy

== Incumbents ==
- President – Giovanni Leone until 15 June; Sandro Pertini from 9 July
- Prime Minister – Giulio Andreotti

== Events ==
- 26 to 28 January – Sanremo Music Festival 1978: Matia Bazar band wins with the song "...e dirsi ciao".
- 31 January – Third Andreotti government falls after Italian Communist Party withdraws support.
- 13 March – Fourth Andreotti government formed (until March 1979).
- 16 March –
  - Former prime minister Aldo Moro kidnapped – the apogee of Italy's Years of Lead.
  - New Andreotti government obtains confidence vote.
- 7 May – 1977–78 Serie A ends: Juventus wins 18th title.
- 9 May – Moro's body was found in Rome.
- 13 May – Basaglia Law approved: gradual dismantling of psychiatric hospitals is initiated. The largest asylum was Mombello Psychiatric Hospital.
- 22 May – Law No. 194 is signed: Abortion in Italy becomes legal.
- 11 and 12 June – 1978 Italian referendums.
- 15 June – President Giovanni Leone resigns under pressure from Lockheed bribery scandal.
- 29 June to 8 July – 1978 Italian presidential election: President of the Chamber of Deputies Sandro Pertini was elected with 832 votes out of 1,011. He is president until 1985.
- 6 August – Pope Paul VI dies in Castel Gandolfo.
- 26 August – Cardinal Albino Luciani, the patriarch of Venice, elected pope – John Paul I. So far, 2026, last Italian pope.
- 21 September – The Tree of Wooden Clogs by Ermanno Olmi released.
- 28 September – Pope John Paul I dies in Apostolic Palace, Vatican City.
- 16 October – Cardinal Karol Wojtyła, the archbishop of Kraków, elected pope – John Paul II (until 2005).

== Births ==
- 28 January – Gianluigi Buffon, goalkeeper
- Barbara Labate, entrepreneur

== Deaths ==
- 9 May – Aldo Moro, former Prime Minister (b. 1916)
- 30 July – Umberto Nobile, Arctic explorer (b. 1885)
- 6 August – Pope Paul VI (b. 1897)
- 22 August – Ignazio Silone, politician and writer (b. 1900)
- 28 September – Pope John Paul I (b. 1912)
- 20 November – Giorgio de Chirico, artist (b. 1888)
- 28 November – Carlo Scarpa, arhitect (b. 1906)
- Lea Del Bo Rossi, medical researcher (b. 1903)

== See also ==
- List of Italian films of 1978
- 1978 in Italian television
