= 1978 in Italian television =

This is a list of Italian television related events from 1978.

== Events ==
=== Rai ===
- 16 March: at 9.58, an extraordinary edition of the TG1, led by Bruno Vespa, heralds Aldo Moro's abduction and the slaughter of his bodyguards. In connection from via Fani, the journalist Paolo Frajese, gasping with emotion, describes the bloody scene of the crime. On 9 May, always Vespa and Frajese, in another dramatic extraordinary edition, lasting almost four hours, report to Italy the discovery of the politician's corpse.
- 18 May: on the eve of the 1978 Italian referendum, four radical exponents appear on Political tribune gagged and with signals on the neck. Following ten minutes of silence, Marco Pannella and Emma Bonino explain that they intended to protest against the space given them by RAI, judged too exiguous.
- 30 May: for the second time in a row, a RAI production (The Tree of Wooden Clogs) wins the Cannes Film Festival.
- 15 June: the President Giovanni Leone, long accused by the press of corruption and nepotism, announces in television his resignation. Clearly tired and embittered, the president ends his speech by saying: “It's my duty to say, it's your right to be reassured, that for six years and a half your president was an honest man.”
- 21 June: the semifinal match Italy-Netherlands of the 1978 FIFA World Cup gets the record audience rating of the year with 27.400.000 viewers.
- 13 July Corrado Mantoni and Dora Moroni, his partner at the show Domenica in, are gravely injured in a car crash. For Moroni, the accident and the following invalidity mean the end of a promising career as singer.
- 13 August: Rai broadcasts in Mondovision the burials of Pope Paul VI, with the commentary of Bruno Vespa.
- 16 October: RAI broadcasts live the election of Pope John Paul II and his first words to the crowd.
- For RAI, the year 1978 is marked, as well as by the particularly dramatic chronicle events, by a sudden wave of liberalism about sex and nudity, in variety shows (Stryx, Ma che sera, Settimo anno), fiction (Madame Bovary) and information (Aquario, L’amore in Italia),

=== Private channels ===
In 1978 the Italian private televisions, overcome the number of 400 and begin to be a serious threat to the RAI monopoly, also if they are again limited to the local scope and their programming remains, with some exception, low quality (sexy shows, old movies in bad copies, infomercials).

- April: RCS Mediagroup enters in the TV business, buying Telealtomilanese, the most popular Lombard private channel.
- 2 May: in Milan, birth of Antenna Nord, owned by the editor Edilio Rusconi.
- 9 May: Franco Alfano, reporter of the Roman television GBR, gets to shot first the opening of the trunk hiding the Aldo Moro’s body, beating on time the RAI correspondent Paolo Frajese. Not wanting to speculate on a tragedy, GBR gives in for free the historical images to RAI.
- 26 May: in Rome, birth of RTI (Radio Televisione Italiana), owned by Carlo Perrone.
- 7 September: the cable TV Telemilanocavo begins to broadcast on air, renamed Tele Milano. In July, its editor Silvio Berlusconi had declared that his television would have been at disposal of the “right wing and anticommunist DC politicians”.
- Birth of Elefante TV, the first Italian network of local televisions, managed by the brothers Leo and Guelfo Marcucci; born as a generalist television, whose star is Beppe Grillo, in the Eighties becomes a channel airing exclusively infomercials.

== Debuts ==
=== Rai ===
- Che combinazione (What a coincidence!) – show, hosted by Delia Scala and later by Rita Pavone, aimed to encourage the payment of the licence fee.
- La sberla (The smack) – cabaret, directed by Giancarlo Nicotra, with Gianfranco D’Angelo and Enrico Beruschi, resuming the formula of Non stop; two seasons.
- Di tasca nostra (Of our own pocket) – magazine in defense of the consumer.
- Maratona d’estate (Summer marathon) - review of ballets from the world, care of Vittoria Ottolenghi.
- USA Eight is enough

==== For children ====
- Il trenino (The little train) – show for children; two seasons.

The year also marks the arrival in Italy of the anime television series. They are popular among the youngest public but inspire fierce criticism by parents and pedagogues.

- Japan Heidi, Girl of the Alps .
- Japan Grendizer.

=== Private channels ===
- Il bingooo (Antenna 3 Lombardia) – game show with musical interludes, hosted by Renzo Villa.
- La bustarella (The sachet) (Antenna 3 Lombardia) – game show hosted by Ettore Andenna and directed by Beppe Recchia and Cino Tortorella, with sexy elements (in some trials, the female contenders end up naked). It sees the debut of many future Mediaset stars, as Carmen Russo.
- Caccia al tredici (Hunt for the thirteen) (various channels) – football magazine, hosted by Gianni Rivera and successively by other champions.
- Grand prix (Quinta Rete) – magazine about motors, hosted by Andrea de Adamich.
- Polvere di stelle (Stardust) (Telealtomilanese) – movie magazine.

== Television shows ==
=== Drama ===
- Padre padrone by Paolo and vittorio Taviani
- Il gabbiano (The seagull) – by Marco Bellocchio, from the Anton Chekhov’s play, with Laura Betti, Pamela Villoresi and Remo Girone.
- Yerma – by Marco Ferreri, from the Federico Garcia Lorca’s play, with Michele Placido, Edmonda Aldini and Franco Citti.
- La governante (The governess) – by Giorgio Albertazzi, from the Vitaliano Brancati’s play, with Anna Proclemer and Gianrico Tedeschi; a Sicilian family must face the scandal of the lesbianism.
- The cherry orchard by Anton Chekhov, directed by Giorgio Strehler, with Valentina Cortese and Franco Graziosi.
- Closed circuit – by Giuliano Montaldo, with Flavio Bucci and Aurore Clement, inspired by Ray Bradbury’s The veldt. The fantastic plot (the bullets of a spaghetti-western gunfighter kill really the spectators in the theatre) is an allegory about the violence in the mass media.
- Mezzo secolo da Svevo (A half century from Italo Svevo). RAI celebrates the 50th anniversary of the writer's death with a cycle of three adaptations (Una vita, A thief in the house, A successful joke), care of Tullio Kezich, a Franco Giraldi's documentary and a debate, moderated by Claudio Magris.
- Il vizio assurdo (The absurd vice) – biopic about Cesare Pavese, by Diego Fabbri and Davide Lajolo, directed by Giancarlo Sbragia, with Luigi Vannucchi as protagonist. The actor, suffering of depression, commits suicide (as Pavese did) few days before the airing.

=== Miniseries ===
- Il balordo (The fool) – by Pino Passalacqua, from the Piero Chiara’s novel, with Tino Buazzelli in his last role; in 3 episodes. A quiet musician, victim of the circumstances, is first prosecuted by the fascism, then hailed as a hero and elected major of his village.
- Jazz band – by Pupi Avati, with Lino Capolicchio, Gianni Cavina and Carlo Delle Piane; music by Amedeo Tommasi; in 3 episodes. Pupi Avati gets his first public success, fictionalizing his youth experiences as jazz clarinetist in the Bologna of the Fifties.
- Le mani sporche (Dirty hands) – by Elio Petri, from the Jean Paul Sartre’s play, with Marcello Mastroianni and Giuliana De Sio; in 3 episodes.
- Madame Bovary – by Daniele D’Anza, from the Gustave Flaubert’s novel, with Carla Gravina and Paolo Bonacelli; in 6 episodes.
- Nella città vampira. Drammi gotici (In the vampire city, gothic dramas) – by Giorgio Bandini, with Flavio Bucci, in 4 episodes; medley of fantastic tales by various authors (Capuana, Lovecraft, Gogol).
- Il processo (The trial) – by Luigi Di Gianni, from the Franz Kafka’s novel, with Franco Graziosi, in 2 episodes.

==== Mystery ====
- Doppia indagine (Double enquiry) by Flaminio Bollini, with Gerardo Amato and Jinny Steffan; mystery written by the same authors of Dov’è Anna and also focused on a woman's disappearance.
- Morte di un seduttore di paese (Death of a country playboy) – by Nanni Fabbri, with Nando Gazzolo and Enrico Ostermann.
- Sarti Antonio brigadiere (The Carabinieri brigader Antonio Sarti) by Pino Passalacqua, from the Loriano Macchiavelli's novel, with Flavio Bonacci.

==== Historical dramas ====
- Alto tradimento (High treason) – by Walter Licastro, with Franco Branciaroli; biopic about Cesare Battisti, in 3 episodes.
- Tecnica di un colpo di stato (Technique of a coup d'état) – docufiction by Silvio Maestranzi about the march on Rome, with Pietro Biondi (Benito Mussolini) and Raoul Grassilli (Luigi Facta); 4 episodes.
- Il furto della Gioconda (The Mona Lisa’s stealing) – by Renato Castellani, with Enzo Cerusico as Vincenzo Peruggia, Bruno Cirino as Pablo Picasso and Philippe Leroy as Leonardo da Vinci; in 3 episodes.
- Disonora il padre (Dishonor thy father) – by Sandro Bolchi, with Stefano Patrizi and Martine Brochard, from the autobiographical novel of Enzo Biagi; 3 episodes. The father of the title is the fascism, to which the young protagonist rebels, adhering to the Resistance.
- La gatta (The female cat) – by Leandro Castellani, with Catherine Spaak as Mathilde Carré; in 3 episodes.
- Ho visto uccidere Ben Barka (I saw Ben Barka murdered) by Tomaso Sherman, with Francesco Carnelutti (Ben Barka) and Josè Quaglio (Oufkir).
- Nero su nero (Black on black) – by Dante Guardamagna, with Paolo Stoppa, in 3 episodes; inspired by the true story of Amalia and Rosa Panvini, who forged the Mussolini diaries.
- Storie della camorra (Histories of camorra) – by Paolo Gazzara, with Mariano Rigillo, Luigi Vannucchi and Massimo Ranieri, in 6 episodes; the history of the Neapolitan criminal society from the Nineteenth century to the Second world war.

==== Foreign miniseries ====
- Sweden Scenes from a marriage by Ingmar Bergman (hit of the year for the critics)
- USA Roots (hit of the year for the public).

=== Serials ===
- I problemi di don Isidro, by Andrea Frezza, from H. Bustos Domecq's Six Problems for don Isidoro Parodi, with Fernando Rey; an inmate solves intricate mysteries without leaving his cell.

=== News and educational ===
- Acquario (Aquarius) – talk show hosted by Maurizo Costanzo. Sensational the episode where the magistrate Vincenzo Salmeri, infamous puritan, has to face the porno-star Ilona Staller.
- L’amore in Italia (Love in Italy) – reportage by Luigi Comencini about the Italian customs changing regard to love, family and sex.
- Indagine sulla parapsicologia (Enquiry about ESP) – by Piero Angela; unlike that in many similar programs, the journalist approaches the subject from a strictly skeptic and rationalistic point of view.
- Douce France - reportage by Enzo Biagi.
- Gulliver - culture magazine, care of Giuseppe Fiori and Ettore Masina.
- 16 e 35 - cinema magazine, with Beniamino Placido.
- La macchina cinema (Cinema machine) by Marco Bellocchio and Silvano Agosti.

=== Variety ===
- 10 hertz – musical show, hosted by Gianni Morandi.
- Vita da Cioni (A Cioni's life) – directed by Giuseppe Bertolucci with Roberto Benigni; the actor plays, in a series of monologues, the role of the lumpen Mario Cioni. The show, before being aired, was stopped for two years by the RAI censure.
- Io e la befana (Me and the befana) – show bound to the Italia Lottery, directed by Romolo Siena, with Raimondo Vianello and Sandra Mondaini (who plays also the clown Sbirulino); TV debut of Gigi e Andrea.
- Ma che sera (What an evening!) – directed by Gino Landi, with Raffaella Carrà, Alighiero Noschese, Paolo Panelli and Bice Valori (last apparition on the little screen for Noschese and Valori). The show, productively sumptuous, is criticized because aired in coincidence with the Moro's kidnapping and for the audacious performances of Carrà, who dances dressed as a sexy nun and sings tunes with explicitly erotic content.
- Macario più (Macario more) – directed by Vito Molinari, with the 76 years old Ermino Macario as showman.
- Mille e una luce (A thousand and one lights) – variety hosted by Claudio Lippi and Luciano De Crescenzo; first Italian example of interactive TV (the public at home can vote the contenders turning the light on or off).
- Il ribaltone (The turnaround) – directed by Antonello Falqui, with Pippo Franco and Loretta Goggi.
- Il sesso forte (The stronger sex) – quiz, hosted by Enrica Bonaccorti and played by a male team and a female one.
- Stryx – directed by Enzo Trapani, hosted by Tony Renis, with Patty Pravo and Angelo Branduardi; sexy musical show inspired to Satanism and witchcraft. Despite a stellar musical cast, the show, perhaps the most audacious in RAI history, is disliked by public and critic and closes a week on advance.
- Uffa, domani è lunedì (Uhf, tomorrow is Monday) – hosted by Enzo Cerusico and Maurizio Micheli.

== Ending this year ==
- Odeon
- Piccolo slam
- Scommettiamo?

== Channels ==
=== New channels ===
- 28 February - Antenna Tre Nordest
- TVA Vicenza

== Deaths ==
Date	Name	Age	Cinematic Credibility
24 January	Maurizio Barendson	54	Italian sport journalist
19 July	Marcello Marchesi	66	Humorist. author and actor
23 July	Fausto Tommei	68	Italian actor, voice actor & television presenter
30 August	Lugi Vannucchi	47	actor (see over)

== See also ==
- List of Italian films of 1978
