= 1982 in Italian television =

This is a list of Italian television related events from 1982.

== Events ==
=== RAI ===
- 30 January: Riccardo Fogli wins the Sanremo Music Festival, hosted by Claudio Cecchetto, with Storie di tutti i giorni.
- 2 June: centenary of Giuseppe Garibaldi's death. In the year, Rai celebrates the anniversary with several documentaries and shows, a series of films and even an interview where Arnoldo Foà plays the “two worlds hero”.
- 11 July - Italy beats West Germany 3–1 to win the 1982 World Cup at Madrid, Spain. The match is absolutely the most seen event in the history of Italian television, with a record audience of 36,7 million viewers.
- 21 luglio: Biagio Agnes becomes RAI general director, in place of Willy de Luca, died suddenly for a stroke.
- 18 September - RAI 1 broadcasts the funeral of Princess Grace.
- 6 October : at La Scala, the first two episodes of The life of Verdi, are screened in preview, in presence of the Prime Minister Giovanni Spadolini; three other episodes are screened, the following day, at the Teatro Regio in Parma.
- 11 October: the daily editions of the Rai news rise up to five, with the introduction of a mid-evening news program.
- 5 December : RAI airs the first episode of Marco Polo. The serial had already premiered at the Venice Film Festival and successfully broadcast in the United States.

=== Private channels ===
In 1982, the three national networks Canale 5 (Berlusconi), Italia 1 (Rusconi) and Rete 4 (Mondadori) were consolidated. They broadcast mainly films and imported fictions, but they also begins to compete with RAI in fields such as entertainment and sport. Many RAI stars migrate to the new competitors or divide their work between public and private channels.

- 3 January: Italia 1 was born from the merger of the Telenord circuit (owned by the Catholic publisher Edilio Rusconi) and other local television stations.
- 4 January: Rete 4 is born; it is owned by the Mondadori group and Enzo Tortora is its artistic director. It's the only national network to give some space to culture and information, entrusted to Girgio Bocca and Enzo Biagi.
- 4 March: closure of Primarete Indipendente, overwhelmed by the crisis of the Rizzoli group.
- 10 March: Callisto Tanzi created Euro TV, a syndacation of 18 local TV stations associated to resist competition from the national networks.
- 18 March: RAI buys 10% of Telemontecarlo's shares.
- 4 May: the magistrate of Rome rejects the appeal of RAI, which had requested the shutdown of the three national networks.
- 6 September: in Brescia Telemarket, specialized in home shopping of art objects, is born; the channel is owned by the businessman Giorgio Corbelli and is visible only in Northern Italy.
- 30 November: Edilio Rusconi sells Italia 1 to Silvio Berlusconi for 29 billion liras.

== Debuts ==
=== Rai ===
==== Serials ====
- Casa Cecilia – by Vittorio De Sisti, with Giancarlo Dettori and Delia Scala, written by Lidia Ravera; 3 seasons. The daily life of a middle-class family (the husband writer, the wife dentist and their three sons).

===== For children =====
- La pietra di Marco Polo (Marco Polo’s stone) – by Aldo Lado; for children. Five Venetian kids make up a gang, searing allegiance upon the stone of the title.
- Anna, Ciro e compagnia – by Mario Caiano, with Cariddi Nardulli and Francesco Pezzulli; 2 seasolns. The adventures of a gang of Roman boys.
- Pimpa – cartoon, by Francesco Tullio Altan.

==== Variety ====
- Che fai, ridi? (What are you doing? Are you laughing?) – cycle of mockumentaries or documentaries in a humorous key about the Italian comic actors, from Monica Vitti to Diego Abatantuono, sometimes works by famous directors as Carlo Vanzina or Pupi Avati.
- Tandem – show for children and teen-agers, hosted by Enza Sampò and others; 5 seasons. An introducing Fabrizio Frizzi cares the games segment.
- G. B. Show – with Gino Bramieri; 6 seasons.
- L’orecchiocchio (The eareye) – pop music magazine; 5 seasons.

==== News and educational ====
- Micromega - cultural magazine, ideated by Ruggero Guarini, 2 seasons.
- Film dossier hosted by Enzo Biagi and others; the airing of a movie gives the cue for a talk-show about actuality or history.
- Processo ai mondiali (Trial to the word championship) – spin-off of Il processo dei luned’, hosted by Aldo Biscardi and broadcast for the FIFA World Cup; 4 editions.

=== Private channels ===
==== Variety ====
- Maurizio Costanzo show (Rete 4, later Canale 5) – talks show hosted by Maurzio Costanzo, lasted till his death in 2022 (with a break-up from 2009 to 2015). The most long-living, popular and controversial Italian talk show, during the years sometimes has faced social questions with commendable commitment, more often has given in to sensationalism and trash.
- Il pranzo è servito (The lunch is on the table, Canale 5) – game show hosted by Corrado Mnltoni, later by Claudio Lippi and Davide Mengacci; 11 seasons . The program, relaxing and unpretentious, is one of the first great successes of the network, also because it is broadcast in the noon time slot, neglected by RAI.
- Superflash (Canale 5) - quiz hosted by Mike Bongiorno, who definitively leaves RAI for Finivest; 5 seasons.
- Premiatissima - musical contest, hosted by Claudio Cecchetto and then by Johnny Dorelli, broadcast in competition with RAI's Fantastico; 5 seasons.
- Attenti a noi due (Beware us two) with Raimondo Vianello and Sandra Monaini, in their first show for Canale 5; 2 seasons.

==== For children ====
- Sbirulino's circus show for children, containing inside cartoons and serials, hosted by Sandra Mondaini; 2 seasons.
- Topolino show (Rete 4)
- Jo Jo – show of catoons (Telereporter), 5 seasons.

==== News and educational ====
- Eurocalcio – sport magazine with Sandro Mazzola; 5 seasons (Euro TV)
- La grande boxe – sport magazine, hosted by Rino Tommasi; 8 seasons (Canale 5).
- Gli speciali di Retequattro – magazine care of Carlo Gregoretti and Enzo Biagi (Rete 4).

=== International ===
- (United States) - Hill street blues (RAI 2)
- (United States) - Magnum P. I. (Canale 5)
- (United States) - The Love Boat (Canale 5)
- (United States) - Guiding light (Canale 5)
- 22 September - (Japan) Voltron (Canale 5) (1984-1985)
- (Japan) Marine Boy (1969-1971)

Private networks try to repeat the Dallas’ success, importing other American serials based on wealth and intrigues.

- (United States) - Flamingo Road (Canale 5)
- (United States) - Falcon Crest (Italia 1)
- (United States) - Dynasty (Rete 4)

South American telenovelas arrive in Italy. Despite their low level (worsened by the hasty dubbing), they achieve great success with the public and become a phenomenon of custom.

- (Brazil) - Dancin' days (Rete 4)
- (Mexico) - Los ricos también lloran (local channels)

== Television shows ==
=== Rai ===
==== TV-movie ====
- La veritaaaà (The truth) – the renowned screenwriter Cesare Zavattini, 80 years old, debuts as director and actor in a medium length film about the dreamlike adventures of a madman escaped from the asylum.
- La vela incantata (The enchanted sail) – by Gianfranco Mingozzi, the story of two brothers, itinerant projectionists, at the time of silent cinema, with Massimo Ranieri, Paolo Ricci and Monica Guerritore.

==== Miniseries ====
- Viaggio a Goldonia (Trip to Goldoniland) – by Ugo Gregoretti, anthology of scenes from the Carlo Goldoni's theatre, revisited and updated, with the same director in the role of a modern reporter in the old time Venice.
- Help me dream by Pupi Avati, with Mariangela Melato and Anthony Franciosa; TV-version in 3 episodes.
- Dancing paradise – by Pupi Avati, with Gianni Cavina and Carlo delle Piane; 3 episodes. The surreal journey of a young man, accompanied by an angel, searching his musician father.
- Mia figlia (My daughter) – by Gianni Bongioanni, with Carlotta Witing, family drama about anorexia, 3 episodes.
- Storia d’amore e d’amicizia (Love and friendship story) – by Franco Rossi, with Claudio Amendola (introducing), Massimo Bonetti and Barbara De Rossi; 6 episodes. In the Thirties, two young boxers, a Jew and an antifascist, are friend and love rivals; both will be victims of the fascism and of the war.
- L’Andreana – by Leonardo Cortese, from the Marino Moretti's novel, with Ilaria Occhini and Gastone Moschin; 5 episodes. The hardships of a widowed fishmonger, of great fortitude but unlucky in her family and business.
- (Germany) Berlin Alexanderplatz by Rainer Werner Fassbinder; coproduced by RAI.

===== Mystery =====
- L’isola del gabbiano (Seagull island) – by Nestore Ungaro, with Priscilla Ransom and Jeremy Brett; 5 episodes. Thriller set on the shores of the Tyrrhenian Sea and coproduced with ITV.
- Inverno al mare (A winter at the sea) – by Silverio Blasi, with Orso Maria Guerrini; inspired by the true story of the 12-years old Ermanno Lavorini's kidnapping and murder.
- La quinta donna (The Fifth Woman) by Alberto Negrin, from the novel by Maria Fagyas, with Klaus Maria Brandauer and Turi Ferro, 3 episodes. A mystery set during the 1956 Hungarian revolution.
- La sconosciuta (The unknowwn woman) – by Daniele D’Anza, with Martine Brochard, Silvia Dionisio, Giancarlo Dettori, Adolfo Celi; 4 episodes. A very intricate spy story revolving around a woman's portrait.
- La trappola originale (The original trap) – by Sivlio Maestranzi, with Helmut Griem and Delia Boccardo; 2 episodes. Thriller about the loss of memory.
- L’occhio di Giuda (The Judas window) – by Paolo Poeti, from the John Dickson Carr's novel, with Adolfo Celi as Sir Henry Merrivale.

===== Political dramas =====
- Panagulis vive (1981) (Panagoullis lives) – biopic by Giuseppe Ferrara, with Stathis Giallelis; 4 episodes.
- Parole e sangue (Words and blood) – by Damiano Damiani, with Matteo Corvino and Paolo Bonacelli; drama about the left-wing terrorism.
- Una tranquilla coppia di killer (A quiet couple of killers), by Gianfranco Albano, with Ray Lovelock (as Michael Townley) and Francesca De Sapio, drama about the Operation Condor.

===== Period dramas =====
RAI answers to the spread of American fictions on the private networks with miniseries, realized in international coproduction and trusted to movie directors.

- Ludwig.by Luchino Visconti', with Helmut Berger in the title role; 3 episodes. For the first time, the Visconti's masterpiece is shown in an integral version, true to the director's intentions, care of Suso Cecchi D’Amico and Enrico Medioli.
- La certosa di Parma (The charterhouse of Parma) – by Mauro Bolognini, from the Stendahl’s novel, with Andrea Occhipinti, Marthe Keller and Gian Maria Volontè; in 6 episodes.
- Marco Polo – by Giuliano Montaldo, with Ken Marshall in the title role, Denhom Elliott and Burt Lancaster as Pope Gregory X; 8 episodes. It's one of the most sumptuous RAI serials, realized in collaboration with NBC and the Chinese TV, that, for the first time, takes part to a Western production; the productive effort is repaid by an extraordinary public success in Italy and abroad. The serial is broadcast in 47 countries and wins three Emmy Awards.
- The life of Verdi – by Renato Castellani; with Ronald Pickup in the title role and Carla Fracci as Giuseppina Strepponi; 9 episodes. The serial is appreciated for the accurate historical reconstruction but criticized for the miscasting of the protagonist.
- Delitto di stato (State crime) – by Gianfranco De Bosio, from the Maria Bellonci's short novel, with Sergio Fantoni and Eleonora Brigliadori; 5 episodes. The miniseries is a story of intrigues and crimes, with the decadence of the House Gonzaga as backdrop; it is remembered for Fantoni's full frontal, the first male one on Italian television.
- La biondina (The little blonde) by Andrea and Antonio Frazzi, from the Marco Praga's novel, with Ottavia Piccolo; the story of an unfaithful wife and her vindictive husband in nineteenth-century Milan.
- Colomba by Giacomo Battiato, from the Prosper Merimèe's novella, with Anne Canovas, Jean Boissery and Alain Cuny; 3 episodes.
- (France) Mozart – by Marcel Bluwal, with Christoph Bantzer; coproduced by RAI.

==== Serials ====
- L’indizio- 5 inchieste per un commissario (The clue – Five enquiries for a superintendent) – by Andrea Camilleri, with Lino Troisi, as a Neapolitan police superintendent in service in Turin, and Ida Di Benedetto.

==== Variety ====
- Attore, amore mio (Actor, my love) – Gigi Proietti’s one-man show, directed by Antonello Falqui.
- Due di tutto (Two of everything) - directed by Enzo Trapani.
- Come Alice (Like Alice) - with Claudia Vegliante and Carlo Verdone.
- Happy magic with Sammy Barbot.
- Illusione, musica, balletto e altro (Illusion, music, dance and other things) – direceted by Gianni Boncompagni, hosted by Giancarlo Magalli, with Silvan as constant guest.
- Lady Magic – with Ornella Vanoni.
- Le regine (The queens) – with Gianni Cavina and, to each episode, a different female star of Italian entertainment.
- Se Parigi... (If Paris) - with Lino Banfi.
- Tutti insieme (Al together) – tribute show to Gianni Morandi, written by Mogol.
- Tip tap club – show for children, with Moana Pozzi (substituted, because her activity as pornstar, by Roberta Giusti) and Bobby Solo.
- L’uovo mondo nello spazio (The world egg in the space) – variety for children set in a space station.

==== News and educational ====
- TG3 set – magazine with Alberto La Volpe.
- Incontri della notte (Night encounters) – interviews, care of Gabriele La Porta to the most famous Italian writers.
- I suoini, ricerche sulla musica popolare italiana (The sounds, researches about italian folk music) by Diego Carpitella.
- Hong-Kong, città di profughi (Hong-Kong, a refugees’ town) by Vittorio De Seta.
- Diario di Guttuso (Renato Guttuso's diary) - by Giuseppe Tornatore.

=== Private channels ===
==== Variety ====
- Cipria (Powder) – variety aimed to the female public, hosted by Enzo Tortora, with Franca Valeri as constant guest (Rete 4).
- Ridiamoci sopra (Let's laugh about it) – with Franco and Ciccio and Nadia Cassini (Canale 5).
- Non lo spaessi ma lo so (If I don't know it, but I know it) – willingly coarse variety with Massimo Boldi and Teo Teocoli; aired on a minor channel (Antenna 3 Lombardia) it is become later a cult object.
- Attenzione! talk-show hosted by Maurizio Costanzo (Napoli Canale 21)

== Ending this year ==
- Apriti sabato
- Il barattolo
- Buonasera con...
- Il fascino dell’insolito
- Flash

== Networks and services ==
=== Launches ===
Network	Type	Launch date	Notes	Source
Retecapri	Cable television	Unknown		

== Deaths ==
- 3 March: Sarah Ferrati, actress (79)
- 21 July: Willy de Luca, jurnalist and RAI general director, 57
- 18 October: Beppe Viola, sport journalist and humorist, 42

== See also ==
- List of Italian films of 1982
