= 1981 in Italy =

- Decades: 1960s; 1970s; 1980s; 1990s; 2000s
- See also: History of Italy; Timeline of Italian history; List of years in Italy

Events during the year 1981 in Italy

== Incumbents ==
- President – Sandro Pertini
- Prime Minister – Arnaldo Forlani (until 27 June); Giovanni Spadolini (after 28 June)

== Events ==
- 28 June – First Spadolini government is formed.
- 13-20 September – EuroBasket Women 1981 takes place in Senigallia.
- Primo Nebiolo is president of the International Association of Athletics Federations (until death in 1999).

== Births ==
- 28 June – Mara Santangelo, tennis player
- 3 July – Carmela Auriemma, politician
- 20 July – Chiara Brancati, water polo player
- 23 July – Irene Franchini, archer
- 24 July – Elisa Cusma, runner
- 2 September – Alessio Sakara, mixed martial artist
- 11 September – Andrea Dossena, footballer and coach
- Marco Panzetti, photographer

== Deaths ==
- 11 February – Gianfranco Faina, professor involved with Azione Rivoluzionaria
- 2 June – Rino Gaetano, musician and singer-songwriter (b. 1950)
- 5 August – Corradino D'Ascanio, designer of helicopter and scooter (b. 1891)
- 12 September – Eugenio Montale, poet, prose writer, editor and translator, Nobel prize winner (b. 1896)
