= 1976 in Italy =

- Decades: 1950s; 1960s; 1970s; 1980s; 1990s
- See also: History of Italy; Timeline of Italian history; List of years in Italy

Events during the year 1976 in Italy

== Incumbents ==
- President – Giovanni Leone
- Prime Minister – Aldo Moro until 30 July (→ Fifth Moro government) then Giulio Andreotti (→ Third Andreotti government)

== Events ==
- 18 January – Renato Curcio, leader of Red Brigades is rearrested in Milan. RB are increasingly militant in 1976-78. (→ Years of Lead)
- 4 to 15 February – Italy at the 1976 Winter Olympics in Innsbruck, Austria: 58 competitors (47 men, 11 women) in 9 sports; 1 Gold, 2 Silver, 1 Bronze medal.
- 19 to 21 February – Sanremo Music Festival 1976: in the only competition between teams of artists, winning team consisted of I Camaleonti, Opera and Sandro Giacobbe. The winning song was Non lo faccio più, performed by Peppino di Capri.
- 9 March – 1976 Cavalese cable car crash: 42 deaths, 1 injured.
- 3 April – Eurovision Song Contest 1976: 7th place for Al Bano and Romina Power with ""We'll Live It All Again (Lo rivivrei)".
- 6 May – 1976 Friuli earthquake: 990 people were killed, up to about 3,000 were injured, and more than 157,000 were left homeless.
- 16 May – 1975–76 Serie A: Torino FC wins 7th title.
- May – Final public appearance of Renata Tebaldi, in a vocal recital in La Scala.
- 20 June – 1976 Italian general election.
- 25 June – Constitutional Court of Italy allows "local" private radio and TV stations. (→ 1976 in Italian television).
- 5 July – Legislature VII of Italy formed (until 1979).
- 10 July – Seveso disaster: an industrial accident near Milan.
- 15 July – Bettino Craxi is Secretary of the Italian Socialist Party after Francesco De Martino (until 1993).
- 17 July to 1 August – Italy at the 1976 Summer Olympics in Montreal: 210 competitors (183 men, 27 women) in 20 sports; 2 Gold, 7 Silver, 4 Bronze medals.
- 30 July – Third Andreotti government formed (until 1978).
- 6 November – Far-left organization Lotta Continua disbands.
- Last opera appearance of Franco Corelli.

== Births ==
- 19 March – Alessandro Nesta, football player
- 4 April – Serena Autieri, actress and singer
- 13 April – Valentina Cervi, actress
- 1 May
  - Michele Frangilli, archer
  - Violante Placido, actress and singer
- 14 June – Primo Brown, rapper (d. 2016)
- 29 June – Antonino Fogliani, conductor (d. 2026)
- 27 August – Francesco Venditti, actor and voice actor
- 27 September – Francesco Totti, football player
- 17 October – Fabri Fibra, rapper
- 10 December – Alessia Fabiani, model, showgirl and TV presenter

== Deaths ==
- 17 March – Luchino Visconti, filmmaker, theatre and opera director, and screenwriter (b. 1906)
- 8 April – Giuseppe Brotzu, physician, microbiologist and politician, contributor to the discovery of cephalosporins (b. 1895)
- 3 August – Olimpio Bizzi, racing cyclist (b. 1916)
- 9 August – Ida d'Este, educator, politician and partisan (b. 1917)
- 11 December – Francesco Merli, opera tenor (b. 1887)

== See also ==
- List of Italian films of 1976
- 1976 in Italian television
- List of number-one hits of 1976 (Italy)
