= 1983 in Italy =

- Decades: 1960s; 1970s; 1980s; 1990s; 2000s
- See also: History of Italy; Timeline of Italian history; List of years in Italy

The following lists events from the year 1983 in Italy.

== Incumbents ==
- President: Sandro Pertini
- Prime Minister: Amintore Fanfani until 4 August (→ Fifth Fanfani government), then Bettino Craxi (→ First Craxi government).

== Events ==
- 3 to 5 February – Sanremo Music Festival 1983: winner of the festival was Tiziana Rivale with the song "Sarà quel che sarà".
- 13 February – Cinema Statuto fire in Turin: 64 deaths, 20 injuries.
- 15 May – 1982–83 Serie A ends: 2nd title for AS Roma.
- 22 June – Disappearance of Emanuela Orlandi in Rome.
- 26 June – 1983 Italian general election. Christian Democrats are significantly weakened.
- June - November – 1983 Italian regional elections.
- 12 July – Legislature IX of Italy founded (until 1987).
- 29 July – Rocco Chinnici, anti-Mafia magistrate, killed by the Sicilian Mafia's car bomb in Palermo. (→ Second Mafia War)
- 4 August – Bettino Craxi is first Prime Minister from Italian Socialist Party (until 1987).
- 23 October – Tommaso Buscetta arrested in Brazil (extradited to Italy next year).

== Births ==
- 31 January – Fabio Quagliarella, football player
- 24 July – Daniele De Rossi, football player and manager

== Deaths ==
- 18 March – Umberto II of Italy, former and the last king of Italy (b. 1904)

== See also ==
- 1983 in Italian television
- List of Italian films of 1983
