= 1981 Italian referendums =

A five-part referendum was held in Italy on 17 and 18 May 1981. The proposals included repealing laws on public order, life sentences, gun licences, and abortion. All were rejected by voters, with no proposal receiving more than 32% of the vote.

== Abortion abrogative referendums ==
Two referendums were held on the new Law 194, which had legalized abortion. The first referendum was called by the Radical Party, which asked more liberalization abolishing all the remaining limits to the free choice of the women. The second was called by Christian Democracy and the Catholic Church and its related movements for life, trying to restore the ban on abortion.

=== Results ===
==== Liberalising abortion laws ====
Choice	Votes	%
Yes	3,588,995	11.6
✗ No	27,395,909	88.4
Invalid/blank votes	3,285,296	–
Total	34,270,200	100
Registered voters/turnout	43,154,682	79.4
Source: Nohlen & Stöver

==== Prohibiting abortion ====
Choice	Votes	%
Yes	10,119,797	32.0
✗ No	21,505,323	68.0
Invalid/blank votes	2,651,999	–
Total	34,277,119	100
Registered voters/turnout	43,154,682	79.4
Source: Nohlen & Stöver

Although both referendums were rejected, and the percentages of support of the Catholic question was higher than the percentages of the Radical one, the result was generally seen as a victory for the Radical Party, which won at least one referendum in a country considered highly influenced by the Catholic Church. The referendum on prohibiting abortion won in one region - Trentino-Alto Adige/Südtirol, specifically the South Tyrol/Bolzano province.

== Police powers abrogative referendum ==
A third referendum was held on repealing the Reale Law, which had been the subject of a referendum in 1978. The referendum was called by the Radical Party, but was only partially supported by the Italian Socialist Party.

=== Results ===
Choice	Votes	%
Yes	4,636,809	14.9
✗ No	26,524,667	85.1
Invalid/blank votes	3,095,721	–
Total	34,257,197	100
Registered voters/turnout	43,154,682	79.4
Source: Nohlen & Stöver

The referendum was rejected by the Italian electors, following the positions of all the parties of the so-called Constitutional Arch.

== Life imprisonment abrogative referendum ==
A fourth referendum was called by the Radical Party asking voters to reject life imprisonment as the highest level of punishment for crimes.

=== Results ===
Choice	Votes	%
Yes	7,114,719	22.6
✗ No	24,330,954	77.4
Invalid/blank votes	2,831,521	–
Total	34,277,194	100
Registered voters/turnout	43,154,682	79.4
Source: Nohlen & Stöver

== Gun licence abrogative referendum ==
The last referendum was called by the Radical Party asking voters to repeal the law on licences to guns, allowing the police to give weapons to some high-risking citizens, thereby banning all citizens from owning guns.

=== Results ===
Choice	Votes	%
Yes	4,423,426	14.1
✗ No	26,995,173	85.9
Invalid/blank votes	2,856,777	–
Total	34,275,376	100
Registered voters/turnout	43,154,682	79.6
Source: Nohlen & Stöver
