= Labate =

Labate is a surname. Notable people with the surname include:

- Barbara Labate (born c. 1978), Italian entrepreneur and business executive
- Joseph LaBate (born 1993), American professional ice hockey player
- Wilma Labate (born 1949), Italian film director and screenwriter
