= 1982 in Italy =

- Decades: 1960s; 1970s; 1980s; 1990s; 2000s
- See also: History of Italy; Timeline of Italian history; List of years in Italy

Events from the year 1982 in Italy

== Incumbents ==
- President: Sandro Pertini
- Prime Minister: Giovanni Spadolini (until 1 December), Amintore Fanfani (starting 1 December)

== Events ==
- 11 July – 1982 World Cup: Italy becomes world champion for the third time in Spain by beating West Germany 3–1.
- 13 September – The Italian parliament approves the Rognoni-La Torre law which introduces the crime of mafia-style criminal association.
- 9 October – Attack on the synagogue in Rome by a group of five Palestinian terrorists: a two-year-old child dies and 35 are seriously injured

== Births ==
- 25 January – Noemi, singer-songwriter and television personality
- 2 February – Filippo Magnini, swimmer
- 11 February – Christian Maggio, footballer
- 2 May – Valeria Bilello, actress and model
- 12 July – Antonio Cassano, footballer
- 18 June – Marco Borriello, professional footballer
- 5 July – Alberto Gilardino, football manager
- 15 July – Laura Chiatti, actress and singer
- 17 July – Stefania Spampinato, actress
- 7 August – Marco Melandri, motorcycle racer
- 12 August – Michele Sensi-Contugi, Italian-born Ecuadorian businessman and government adviser (d. 2026)
- 9 September – Francesco Gabbani, singer-songwriter and multi-instrumentalist
- 27 December – Elisa Isoardi, tv host

== Deaths ==
- 16 October – Mario Del Monaco, opera singer (b. 1915)
- 2 December – Giovanni Ferrari, footballer (b. 1907)
- 30 December – Giuseppe Aquari, cinematographer (b. 1916)

== See also ==
- 1982 in Italian television
- List of Italian films of 1982
