= 1984 in Italy =

- Decades: 1960s; 1970s; 1980s; 1990s; 2000s
- See also: History of Italy; Timeline of Italian history; List of years in Italy

Events from the year 1984 in Italy

== Incumbents ==
- President: Sandro Pertini
- Prime Minister: Bettino Craxi (First Craxi government)

== Events ==
=== February ===
- 2 to 4 February – Sanremo Music Festival 1984: Al Bano and Romina Power with "Ci sarà" win Big Artists section; Eros Ramazzotti wins newly established Newcomers section with the song "Terra promessa".
- 8 to 19 February – Italy at the 1984 Winter Olympics in Sarajevo, Yugoslavia: 74 competitors in 9 sports, 2 Gold medals (Paul Hildgartner and Paoletta Magoni).
- 18 February – Revision of Lateran Treaty (1929) signed: Catholic religion is not the sole religion of the Italian State.

=== May ===
- 5 May – Eurovision Song Contest 1984 in Luxembourg: 5th place for Alice and Franco Battiato for "I treni di Tozeur".
- 13 May – 1983–84 Serie A ends: Juventus FC wins 21st title.

=== June ===
- 7 June – Enrico Berlinguer, General Secretary of the Italian Communist Party, suffered a brain haemorrhage while giving a speech at a public meeting in Padua; he dies four days later.
- 13 June – Berlinguer funeral in Rome, around one million people attended. (List of largest funerals)
- 17 June – 1984 European Parliament election in Italy: only time that Communists placed first in a national election.
- 24 June –
  - Antonio Bisaglia, Christian Democrat Senator, drowns off the coast of Santa Margherita Ligure.
  - Alessandro Natta is new General Secretary of the Italian Communist Party (until 1988).
- 28 June – Tommaso Buscetta extradited from Brasil. (→ Maxi Trial from 1986)

=== July ===
- 5 July – Diego Maradona welcomed in Naples. He plays for SSC Napoli until 1991.
- 28 July to 12 August – Italy at the 1984 Summer Olympics in Los Angeles, USA: 268 competitors in 23 sports; 14 Gold, 6 Silver, 12 Bronze medals.

=== August ===
- 26 August – Eight people were killed in Torre Annunziata in a massacre linked to the Camorra.
- 27 August – Fininvest buys Rete 4 television channel.
- 9 September – 1984 Italian Grand Prix held at Monza Circuit, won by Austrian Niki Lauda.

=== October ===
- 16 October – Three judges, in Turin, Pescara and Rome, order private (Silvio Berlusconi's) TV networks to be closed.
- 20 October – Craxi government passes an emergency decree legalising the nationwide transmissions made by Berlusconi's television stations

=== November ===
- November – Aftermath of Golpe Borghese (1970): all 46 defendants were acquitted on the appeal trial because the "fact did not happen" and only existed in "a private meeting between four or five sixty-years-olds".

=== December ===
- 23 December – Train 904 bombing: 16 killed, 266 wounded by the Sicilian Mafia.

== Births ==
- 30 July – Barbara Berlusconi, business executive

== Deaths ==
- 11 June – Enrico Berlinguer, 62, General Secretary of the Italian Communist Party
- 24 June – Antonio Bisaglia, 55, Christian Democrat Senator

== See also ==
- 1984 in Italian television
- List of Italian films of 1984
