= Faina =

Faina may refer to:

- Faina, Goiás, Brazil
- Ukrainian ship MV Faina
- Fainá, fainâ, or farinata, pancake of chickpea flour

== People with the given name ==
- Faina Chiang Fang-liang, née Ipat'evna Vakhreva (1916–2004), First Lady of the Republic of China
- Faina Jyrkilä (1917–2008), Finnish sociologist
- Faina Kirschenbaum (born 1955), Israeli politician
- Faina Melnik (1945–2016), Ukrainian-born Olympic champion discus thrower
- Faina Petryakova (1931–2002), Ukrainian academic
- Faina Ranevskaya (1896–1984), Soviet actress

== People with the surname ==
- Gianfranco Faina (died 1981), Italian historian
