= 1987 in Italy =

- Decades: 1960s; 1970s; 1980s; 1990s; 2000s
- See also: History of Italy; Timeline of Italian history; List of years in Italy

Events from the year 1987 in Italy

== Incumbents ==
- President: Francesco Cossiga
- Prime Minister: Bettino Craxi until 18 April, then Amintore Fanfani until 29 July, then Giovanni Goria

== Events ==
- 4 to 7 February – 37th Sanremo Music Festival. Song Si può dare di più becomes number-one hit.
- 18 April – Sixth Fanfani government
- 9 May – Eurovision Song Contest 1987 held in Brussels: 3rd place for Umberto Tozzi and Raf with "Gente di mare"
- 17 May – 1986–87 Serie A ends: SSC Napoli, under the leadership of captain Diego Maradona, wins 1st title. (→ 1986–87 SSC Napoli season)
- 7 and 13 June – 1987 Coppa Italia final: Napoli wins 4 - 0 on aggregate over Atalanta BC.
- 14 and 15 June – 1987 Italian general election: Christian Democracy under Ciriaco De Mita widens the distance from Communists under Alessandro Natta
- 2 July – Legislature X of Italy founded (until 1992)
- 29 July – Goria government (until April 1988)
- 8 November – 1987 Italian referendums.
- 13 December – Gianfranco Fini is Secretary of Italian Social Movement.
- 16 December – Maxiprocesso ends in Palermo: 338 were convicted out of 475 defendants; 19 life sentences were handed and 2,665 years of prison sentences.

== Deaths ==
- 7 February – Claudio Villa, singer and actor, four-time Sanremo winner (b. 1926)
- 3 March – Balilla Lombardi, footballer (b. 1916)
- 11 April – Primo Levi, Jewish Italian chemist, partisan, Holocaust survivor and writer (b. 1919)

== See also ==
- 1987 in Italian television
- List of Italian films of 1987
