= 1980 in Italy =

- Decades: 1960s; 1970s; 1980s; 1990s; 2000s
- See also: History of Italy; Timeline of Italian history; List of years in Italy

Events during the year 1980 in Italy

== Incumbents ==
- President – Sandro Pertini
- Prime Minister – Francesco Cossiga (until 18 October); Arnaldo Forlani (after 18 October)

== Events ==
- 6 January – Piersanti Mattarella, president of Sicily, killed by the Mafia in Palermo.
- 7 to 9 February – Sanremo Music Festival 1980: Toto Cutugno wins with the song "Solo noi".
- 13 to 24 February – Italy at the 1980 Winter Olympics, in Lake Placid: 46 competitors, 34 men and 12 women, in 8 sports, winning 2 Silver medals.
- March – Totonero match-fixing scandal.
- 19 April – Eurovision Song Contest 1980 in The Hague, Netherlands: Alan Sorrenti is sixth-placed with Non so che darei.
- 11 May – 1979–80 Serie A: Inter Milan wins 12th title.
- 8 and 9 June – 1980 Italian regional elections and 1980 Italian local elections.
- 11 to 22 June – UEFA Euro 1980 held in Italy.
- 27 June – Ustica Massacre: Itavia Flight 870 crashes into the Tyrrhenian Sea mid-flight from Bologna to Palermo, killing all 81 people on board.
- 19 July to 3 August – Italy at the 1980 Summer Olympics, in Moscow: Italy competed under the Olympic Flag, in partial support of American-led boycott. There were 159 competitors, 121 men and 38 women, in 88 events in 19 sports, winning 8 Gold, 3 Silver and 4 Bronze medals.
- 2 August – A terrorist attack at Bologna Centrale railway station kills 85 people and injures over 200.
- c. 17 October – Giarre murder.
- 18 October – Forlani government is formed (until June 1981), after Second Cossiga government fell due to the rejection of the 1980 Budget by Parliament.
- 23 November – A magnitude-6.9 earthquake kills 2,483, injures 7,700, and displaces hundreds of thousands.
- The Name of the Rose, debut novel by Umberto Eco is published.
- Altri Libertini, a romanzo a episodi by Pier Vittorio Tondelli is published.

== Birth ==
- 19 January – Anna Incerti, runner
- 21 February – Tiziano Ferro, singer, songwriter
- 17 June – Elisa Rigaudo, race walker
- 23 June – Francesca Schiavone, tennis player
- 26 July – Giulia Pignolo, sailor
- 30 July – Roberto Cammarelle, boxer
- 6 August – Vitantonio Liuzzi, Formula One driver (or in 1981)
- 19 September – Roland Fischnaller, snowboarder
- 25 September – Elio Germano, actor
- 7 October – Clarissa Claretti, hammer thrower
- 27 November – Dargen D'Amico, rapper
- 25 December – Guè, rapper
- 29 December – Nesli, rapper

== Deaths ==
- 1 January
  - Aldo Aimi, footballer (b. 1906)
  - Pietro Nenni, politician (b. 1891)
- 6 January – Piersanti Mattarella, President of Sicily (b. 1935)
- 9 January – Gaetano Belloni, road racing cyclist (b. 1892)
- 22 January – Teresa Noce, labour leader, activist and journalist (b. 1900)
- 27 January – Peppino De Filippo, actor (b. 1903)
- 28 January – Franco Evangelisti, composer (b. 1926)
- 1 February – Gastone Nencini, road racing cyclist (b. 1930)
- 7 February – Secondo Campini, jet pioneer (b. 1904)
- 21 February – Aldo Andreotti, mathematician (b. 1924)
- 26 February – Mario Mattoli, Italian director and screenwriter (b. 1898)
- 30 March – Mantovani, Italian British conductor, composer (b. 1905)
- 14 April – Gianni Rodari, writer and journalist (b. 1920)
- 6 August – Marino Marini, sculptor (b. 1901)
- 14 August – Diego Fabbri, Italian playwright (b. 1911)
- 29 August – Franco Basaglia, psychiatrist, disability advocate (b. 1924)

== See also ==
- List of Italian films of 1980
- 1980 in Italian television
- List of number-one hits of 1980 (Italy)
