= Movement of 1977 =

Italian political movement

The movement of 1977 (Italian: Movimento del '77) was a spontaneous political movement that arose in Italy in 1977. It grew primarily out of the extra-parliamentary left; in form and substance, it was completely unlike previous student movements such as the protests of 1968. In fact, it was characterized by vocal opposition to the party system, unions, and even political movements.

== Historical and social context ==
The movement arose in conjunction with the crisis of the extra-parliamentary organizations that led to social struggles in the years after the 1968, together with the so-called mass university: after the 1969 school reform, also young people from proletarian families could attend a university, which, until then, had been a privilege held almost exclusively by students from more affluent classes.

After a decade of disputes in schools and in society, the rigor of the old revolutionary groups appeared inadequate and outdated. Indeed, the protests were also addressed at the political practice of those organizations from which the participants in the movement of 1977 originated. Moreover, the feminist movement, which since the early '70s had had a very strong growth, was present in the movement with its instances of sexual liberation.

Another important aspect was the political action of Marco Pannella's Radical Party. Pannella, after the victory in the 1974 referendum for divorce, had greatly enlarged the ranks of his party, and concentrated their efforts on human rights, civil rights, pacifism and nonviolence. Among the Radical Party's goals was also a struggle against authoritarianism and repression, the gay liberation and the anti-prohibitionism of drugs. At that time, underground culture and counterculture newspapers, such as the magazine Re Nudo (The Naked King) founded in 1969 in Milan by a group of activists, started being printed. These had organized two large pop rallies (named Youth Festival of the proletariat) in Parco Lambro, Milan, somewhat modeled on the Woodstock festival (1969).

The culture also passed through the so-called free radios, born after the liberalization of broadcasting in 1976. Internationally, in 1977 there came the "first wave" of punk subculture called "Punk 77", particularly relating to British scene (British Punk) and American (American punk). In this context a complex movement, libertarian and creative, was born where there were no leaders and where involvement and responsibility were closely personal, although a leading role in the struggles continued being played by the now dissolved Lotta Continua militants, and especially by the area of autonomy.

== Political actions ==
Some of the practices of struggle that characterized the movement were formalized during the 70s and tended to propose a model of direct action where change was to take place immediately, with the reappropriation of goods and areas claimed as a right. Occupation of vacant and / or abandoned houses, proletarian expropriations, one-sided reduction of bills and services in general (from cinema to catering operations), became the typical practices of the movement, which stood alongside the separate actions of extra-parliamentary left as militant anti-fascism.

The movement of '77 involved some marginalized sectors of society in large cities, such as those living in slums. The movement was committed to counter the circulation of heroin, through information campaigns and by fighting trafficking.

== Break with the institutional left ==
In 1977, the creative and peaceful wing of the movement and Autonomia Operaia, the extra-parliamentary leftist movement which advocated armed struggle in the streets instead, finally severed their ties to the Italian Communist Party (PCI), strongly contesting the policy of the historic compromise, and the perceived abandonment of the opposition to bourgeois power.

On February 17, 1977, Luciano Lama, secretary-general of the CGIL, the trade union closest to the PCI, gave a speech inside the occupied La Sapienza University. During the speech, the autonomi (members of Autonomia Operaia) and the CGIL's security service had a violent clash, that resulted in Lama being chased away. The event would become famous and remembered as The expulsion of Lama from La Sapienza university. The clash between the PCI and Autonomia made the more radical current within Autonomia stronger. The more moderate current, which included extravagant components, such as the Indiani Metropolitani movement, found themselves in a minority. Some of the autonomi decided that the time had come to alzare il livello dello scontro (to raise the level of the conflict), in other words, to start using firearms.

== Riots ==
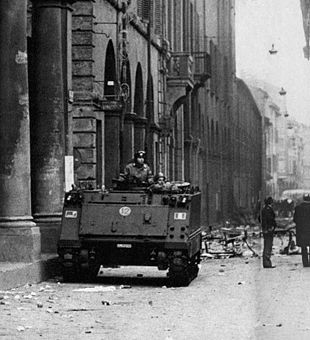
Riots in Bologna: Armored vehicle in the university area.

That year, the city of Bologna was the scene of violent street clashes. In particular, on March 11 a militant of Lotta Continua named Francesco Lorusso was killed by a gunshot to the back (fired by a policeman), during charges to disperse a group of persons who had organized a protest against a mass meeting of Communion and Liberation, which was being held that morning at the university. This event served as a detonator for a long series of clashes with security forces for two days, that affected the entire city of Bologna.

The interior Minister Francesco Cossiga sent armored vehicles into the university area and other hot spots of the city to quell what he perceived as guerrilla warfare. Clashes with the police caused numerous casualties among people who got caught up in the riots, including uninvolved locals. No old leftist party, except the Youth Socialist Federation, led by his local secretary Emilio Lonardo, participated at the funeral of the student Lorusso, remarking the dramatic split between the movement and the historical left parties.

Turin was also the scene of bloody clashes and attacks. On October 1, 1977, after a procession had started with an attack on the headquarters of the Italian Social Movement (MSI), a group of militants of Lotta Continua reached a downtown bar, L'angelo azzurro (The Blue Angel), frequented by young right-wing activists. Following the launch of two Molotov cocktails, Roberto Crescenzio, a totally apolitical student, died of burns. The perpetrators of the murder were never identified. A leader of Lotta Continua, Silvio Viale, called the fact a "tragic accident".

Another innocent victim of the riots of that year was Giorgiana Masi, who was killed in Rome by a gunshot during an event organized by the Radical Party to celebrate the third anniversary of the victory in the referendum on divorce. As the perpetrators of the murder remained unknown, the movement attributed the responsibility of the crime to police officers in plain clothes.

== End of the movement ==
By the late 1970s the movement had exhausted its initial spontaneous momentum. The Moro kidnapping prompted many members of leftist groups outside Parliament to adhere to the motto found on the bannerhead of the Lotta Continua newspaper: "Né con lo stato, né con le Brigate Rosse" ("Neither with the State, nor with the Red Brigades"). Several young people joined in the armed struggle while others focused on activism within parliamentary parties. Others – disillusioned and in despair – turned to mysticism and Eastern philosophies, while some withdrew into communities for alternative lifestyles. The rest of the movement retreated entirely into the private sphere, a process known as riflusso ("reflex").

Only a few organizations remained to uphold the principles of the movement: the most notable among them was Democrazia Proletaria (Proletarian Democracy), a newly-established party which occupied space to the left of the PCI and became a reference point for many young people involved in 1980s politics. Several leaders and celebrities of the movement, veterans of the early experience of the 1960s, joined the nascent Italian green movement. Others attached themselves to the old parties (especially the Italian Socialist Party – PSI), devoting themselves to their careers: in practice, becoming yuppies.

At the same time other new forms of organizing political struggle were born; they were very localized and congregated around self-managed social centers (Centri Sociali), which, in turn, gave birth to the Italian anti-globalization movement.
