= 1985 in Italy =

- Decades: 1960s; 1970s; 1980s; 1990s; 2000s
- See also: History of Italy; Timeline of Italian history; List of years in Italy

Events from the year 1985 in Italy

== Incumbents ==
- President: Sandro Pertini (until 29 June), Francesco Cossiga (starting 3 July)
- Prime Minister: Bettino Craxi

== Events ==
- 19 July – Val di Stava dam collapse kills 268 people
- 23 September – Crime reporter Giancarlo Siani killed by the Camorra in Naples.
- 7 October – Achille Lauro hijacking and subsequent Sigonella crisis

== Births ==
- 7 February – Devis Nossa, footballer
- 8 July – Emanuele Abate, hurdler
- 31 August – Serena Rossi, actress
- 25 October – Nicola Fontanive, ice hockey player
- 27 October – Stefano Bianco, motorcycle racer (d. 2020)

== See also ==
- 1985 in Italian television
- List of Italian films of 1985
