= Franca Nuti =

Italian actress (1929–2024)

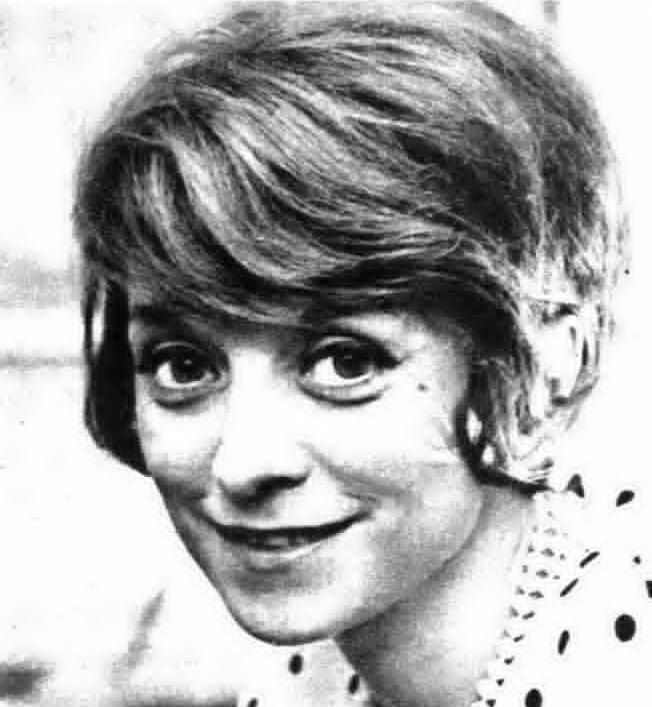
- Nuti in Radiocorriere magazine, 1969
- Born: 15 January 1929; Turin, Italy
- Died: 12 May 2024 (aged 95); Milan, Italy
- Occupation: Actress

Franca Nuti (15 January 1929 – 12 May 2024) was an Italian actress and acting teacher.

== Life and career ==
Born in Turin in 1929, Nuti graduated from the Accademia dei Filodrammatici drama school in 1954, and made her professional debut with the Benassi-Brignone-Santuccio stage company, in the Jean Anouilh's drama The Lark. Mainly active on stage, she is best known as the main actress in five drama plays directed by Luca Ronconi between mid-1980s and 1990s. She specialized in the Henrik Ibsen's repertoire, and has over 200 credits between stage plays, radio dramas and television appearances. Among others, during her career she worked with Franco Zeffirelli, Giorgio Albertazzi, Orazio Costa, Aldo Trionfo, Sandro Bolchi, Giancarlo Cobelli, Tino Buazzelli, and Lamberto Puggelli. Her last role was Brunhilde Pomsel in the Christopher Hampton's drama A German Life, that she performed at the Piccolo Teatro in Milan in 2021.

Since the 1980s, Nuti was also an acting teacher, serving at the Accademia Nazionale di Arte Drammatica Silvio D'Amico, at the Paolo Grassi School, and at the drama school of the Piccolo Teatro. During her career she received various honours and accolades, including four Ubu Prizes and a Premio Flaiano in 1990 for her performance in Anton Chekhov's Three Sisters.

Nuti died on 12 May 2024, at the age of 95. She was married to actor Giancarlo Dettori. They have two children.
