= 1976 in Italian television =

This is a list of Italian television related events from 1976.

== Events ==
1976 is the year of three turning points in the history of Italian television: the reform of RAI, the official beginning of the color broadcastings by RAI, and the birth of the private channels on air.

=== The RAI reform ===
- 30 January. RAI reform. The firm passes from the government's control to the parliament's one. The National and the Second Channel change their names to Raiuno and Raidue and become two autonomous and concurrent channels. Raiuno is more traditionalist, while Raidue is more experimental and liberal. The information is served by two news programs of different political biases. Similar changes are performed in the radio sector. The reform makes RAI more pluralist and less censored, but accentuates too the spoils system.
- 15 March: debut of TG1, directed by the Catholic Emilio Rossi, and TG2, directed by the socialist Andrea Barbato.
- 6 May: the night news announces the Friuli earthquake to the nation. In the following days, extraordinary editions of the news and reports on the catastrophe occupy most of the RAI programming.
- 25 October. New schedule of the RAI programs; RAI Due gets the same broadcasting time as Rai Uno (12:30-2:00 pm and 5:00-11:30 pm.)
- 8 December: the magazine Odeon, in a report about the cabaret Crazy Horse in Paris, shows naked women for the first time on the Italian television.
- 15 December. In Lombardy, the first regional broadcastings by RAI begin.

=== The color ===
- 21 February: Peppino di Capri, with Non lo faccio più, wins the Sanremo Music festival, hosted by Giancarlo Guardabassi; for the last time, RAI broadcasts the event in black and white.
- 17 July: Starting from the inaugural ceremony, RAI broadcasts in color the 1976 Summer Olympics.
- 7 August. RAI begins the "experimental phase" of the color, lasting six months, broadcasting from Wimbledon the tennis match Italy-England for the Davis Cup. The experimentation is limited to sport, news and cultural programs, excluding the entertainment (films, fictions and varieties).
- 7 December: for the first time, RAI broadcasts the Premiere at La Scala (the Verdi's Othello); the show is in color. Outside the theatre, a battle between police and protesters is fought.
- 30 December: the Economic Programming Committee chose definitively the PAL system for the color broadcastings.

=== The private channels ===
- Telemontecarlo opens a studio in Milan, where the first Italian private news program (Il giornale nuovo, care of Indro Montanelli and the Il giornale's redaction) is recorded.
- June 9: TeleAppula, one of the first Italian private channels on air, begins to broadcast from the Mercadante theatre in Altamura.
- June 25: A sentence of the Constitutional court allows to the private radio and TV stations to broadcast "not exceeding the local area".
- Summer. After the Court's sentence, birth of other private channels: RTP (Radio Televisione Peloritana) in Messina. Telemilano in Milan, Teleroma, Quinta Rete and GBR, the first to broadcast in color, in Rome.(Telemilano and Teleroma were already active as cable channels).
- August. In Malta, birth of Radio Televisione Indipendente, private channel in Italian language, property of Angelo Rizzoli; in September, Dom Mintoff announces the opening of Telemalta, a TV in Italian managed in company by Rizzoli and the Maltean government, and relayed on the whole Italian territory. The project will remain unfulfilled.
- 11 December: birth of the Puglia local TV TeleNorba. At the end of the year, in Italy around fifty private channels already exist. Ediliio Rusconi is the first Italian editor to enter in the TV business, founding Quinta Rete in Rome and Antenna Nord in Milan.

== Debuts ==
=== Serials ===
- Space 1999 – sci-fi series coproduced by ITC and RAI; 2 seasons.
- USA - Kojak

=== Variety ===
- L’altra domenica (The other Sunday) – hosted by Renzo Arbore, on Rai Due. The show is born as a "container" to fill the dead times among the sport programs in the Sunday afternoon, but becomes very popular among the younger public for its demented and then transgressive humor. It launches Roberto Benigni, in the role of a mad movie critic and Isabella Rossellini as special correspondent.
- Domenica in (Sunday in) – hosted, for the first three editions, by Corrado Mantoni, on Rai Uno. It's another "container show", similar by formula to L'altra domenica, but aimed to a family audience. Since the beginning, the show is a great public success; in the years, it had been hosted, among others, by Pippo Baudo, Lino Banfi, Mara Venier, Carlo Conti and Massimo Giletti and is now again one of the pivots of the RAI palimpsest, also if its more recent editions have been often accused to be "trash TV".
- Scommettiamo? (Let it bet?) – quiz inspired by the horse racing, hosted by Mike Bongiorno, who comes back in RAI after a two years "exile" at the Swiss TV.

=== News and educational ===
- Almanacco del giorno dopo (Next day's almanac) – magazine of petty culture.
- TG l’una, quasi un rotocalco per la domenica (TG one hour, an almost magazine for the Sunday) – talk show with reportages, broadcast on Rai Uno the Sunday at the lunch hour.
- Bontà loro (For their goodness) – first Italian talk-show, hosted by Maurizio Costanzo, on RAI Uno the Monday late evening. The show is a novity for the tone of the interviews, polite but not obsequious, also towards the politicians, and sometimes unprejudiced; famous is the question about her private life to Tina Anselmi, first Italian woman minister.
- Odeon, tutto quanto fa spettacolo (Odeon, all about show business) – magazine about show business by Brando Giordani and Emilio Ravel, famous for having broken the RAI taboo about female nakedness (see over).

== Television shows ==
=== Drama ===
- Tosca – by Giancarlo De Bosio, with Plácido Domingo; TV version of the Puccini's opera, shot in Rome, on the real places of the action.
- Rosso veneziano (Venetian red) – by Marco Leto, from the Pier Paolo Pasinetti's novel, with Gastone Moschin, Carlo Hintermann, Pier Paolo Capponi and Elisabetta Pozzi; 2 episodes. The intricate story of two Venetian families on the eve of the Second World War.
- Bettina - by Luca Ronconi, from Carlo Goldoni's La putta onorata and La buona moglie, with Michela Martini, Bruno Zanin and Renzo Montagnani.

==== Biopics ====
- La città del sole (The city of the sun) – by Gianni Amelio, with Giulio Brogi as Tommaso Campanella,
- Ambrogio di Milano - by Gianfranco Bettetini, with Giulio Brogi in the title role.
- Mayakovsky by Alberto Negrin, with Tito Schirinzi in the title role and Piera Degli Esposti as Lilya Brik.
- L’assassinio di Federico Garcia Lorca (Federico Garcia Lorca’s murder) – by Alessandro Cane, with Roberto Bisacco in the title role.

=== Miniseries ===
- Camilla - in four episodes, by Sandro Bolchi, with Giulietta Masina, from Fausta Cialente's A very cold winter; the hardship of a Milan family in the first winter after the war..
- Le cinque stagioni (The five seasons) – in four episodes, by Gianni Amico, with Tino Carraro and Elsa Merlini; the life in a retirement home. Last role for the great character and voice actor Carletto Romano.

==== Period dramas ====
- Sandokan – in six episodes, by Sergio Sollima, with Kabir Bedi (Sandokan), Carole Andrè (Marianna), Philippe Leroy (Yanez) and Adolfo Celi (Lord Brooke); from Emilio Salgari's The tigers of Mompracem. The Salgari's escapist novel is interpreted by the director in a political and anti-colonialist key. The miniseries, shot on true locations, gets 27 million viewers by episode and is a social phenomenon, in spite of the cold judgments of the critics; the unknown Indian actor Kabir Bedi becomes a star and the title track a hit. It's considered the most successful fiction in RAI history and got, in the years, a cinematographic version and three sequels.
- Michel Strogoff – by Jean-Pierre Decourt, international coproduction from the Jules Verne's novel, that replies the Sandokan's success; the Italian actress Lorenza Guerrieri has the leading female role.
- Manon – by Sandro Bolchi, with Monica Guerritore and Paolo Bonacelli, from the Antoine Francois Prevost's novel.
- Paganini – biopic by Dante Guardamagna, with Tino Schirinzi in the title role, music for violin performed by Salvatore Accardo; 4 episodes.
- I 3 moschettieri (The three muskeeters) – by Sandro Sequi, semi-parodic version of the Alexandre Dumas’ novel, with four actors (Paolo and Lucia Poli, Marco Messeri, Milena Vukotic) playing all the roles; 15 episodes, for children.

==== Para-normal ====
- La mia vita con Daniela (My life with Daniela) – in two episodes; paranormal thriller by Domenico Campana, with Ivana Monti
- Il figlio di due madri (The boy with two mothers) - by Ottavio Spadaro, from Massimo Bontempelli's novel, with Giulia Lazzarini and Anna Maria Guarnieri; drama about reincanation.
- Extra – in two episodes, by Daniele D’Anza, with Vittorio Mezzogiorno; science-fiction miniseries, set in USA, about the alien abductions.

==== Mystery ====
- Origins of the Mafia – in five episodes, by Enzo Muzii, script by Leonardo Sciascia; history of the Mafia, from the sixteenth century to today, with an international cast.
- A casa, una sera... - in two episodes, by Mario Landi, with Nino Castelnuovo and Lia Tanzi; from Francis Durbridge's Suddenly at home.
- Dimenticare Lisa (To forget Lisa) – in three episodes, by Salvatore Nocita, with Ugo Pagliai; from Francis Durbridge's The doll, whose action is transferred in Naples.
- Aut-aut, cronaca di una rapina (Aut-aut, chronicle of a hold-up) – in two episodes, by Silvio Maestranzi, with Gabriele Lavia; reconstruction of a crime story really happened in Denmark.
- Albert e l’uomo nero (Albert and the black man) – by Dino B. Partesano, with Nando Gazzolo and Carlo Simoni; 3 episodes. A 9 years old kid is the only witness of his stepmother's murder.
- Dov’è Anna? (Where is Anna?) – In seven episodes, by Piero Schivazappa, with Mariano Rigillo and Scilla Gabel. Anna, an ordinary middle-class woman, disappears; the investigations both by the police and by the husband and a friend of the missing, improvised detectives, reveal always new and unsuspected sides in Anna's secret life, till to a sad ending. The miniseries deals social question audacious for the time, as the market of the adoptions and the mental disease. The final episode gets an audience of 28 million viewers, absolute record for an Italian fiction.

=== Variety ===
- Chi? (Who?) – hosted by Pippo Baudo; "detective quiz" combined to the Lotteria Italia, including inside it short mystery fictions with Alberto Lupo and Nino Castelnuovo..
- Dal primo momento che ti ho visto (Since first time I Saw you) – by Vito Molinari, with Massimo Ranieri and Loretta Goggi; mix of variety and fiction. A love story is the thread for the songs of the two vocalists and for the Loretta Goggi's impersonations.
- Serata con Achille Campanile – by Mario Ferrero; cycle of Campanile’s sketches and one acts, hosted by Giancarlo Dettori.
- Due ragazzi incorreggibili (Two incorrigible boys) – by Romolo Siena, with Franco and Ciccio, reunited after a five-year separation. It includes the miniseries Sandogat, parody of Sandokan.
- Onda libera (Free wave) – by Beppe Recchia, ideated by Giuseppe Bertolucci, with Roberto Benigni, on Rai due. An imaginary private channel, based in a stable, interferes with the RAI programs. For its foul mouthed humor the show is censured by RAI (the original title Televacca, Tvcow, is changed and the caricature character of a priest is deleted)
- Rete tre (Third channel) – by Enzo Trapani, with Arnoldo Foà, Ombretta Colli and Gianni Morandi. Through an imaginary third channel, the show mocks the true RAI programs (i.e., the fiction Dov’è Ada is a parody of Dov’è Anna, see over).
- Per una sera d’estate (For a summer evening) – musical show, hosted by Claudio Lippi.
- Tre uomini e una donna (Three man and a woman) – musical show with Nada and the singer-songwriters Paolo Conte, Piero Ciampi and Renzo Zanobi. The program is not aired at the time and gets the public only when is published on Rai Play.
- Er Lando furioso – satirical viariety about yesterday and today Rome, with Lando Fiorini and Maria Rosaria Omaggio.
- Ma che, scherziamo? (What, are we kidding?) – variety about the practical jokes, hosted by Gianni Agus.

=== News and educational ===
- Bertolucci secondo il cinema (Bertolucci according to the cinema) by Gianni Amelio; reportage about the shooting of Bertolucci's 1900.
- Babau – with Paolo Poli, in four episodes; enquiry about the faults of the Italians, halfway between satirical variety and custom reportage, with the interventions of intellectuals as Umberto Eco. The show, recorded in 1970, is broadcast only after six years, for censure's reasons.
- I quaderni neri (The black dossiers) – historical documentaries; it's one of the first programs broadcast in color by RAI.
- La questione femminile (The female question) – by Virgilio Sabel; reportage in ten episodes, inside the cultural column Sapere.
- Marisa della Magliana - by Maricla Boggio; docufiction about the life of a single mother.
- Il sogno di una cosa – by Francesco Bortolini; documentary about the Pier Paolo Pasolini's youth.
- Storia di Filomena e Antonio, gli anni 70 e la droga a Milano (History of Filomena and Antonio, the Seventies and the drug in Milan) – by Antonello Branca; docufiction interpreted by a real-life couple of drug addicted.
- Ring - hosted by Aldo Falivena; a politician or a public personality must face the questions by 9 journalists.^{]}

== Ending this year ==
- Adesso musica
- Sapere
- Qui squadra mobile
