= Accademia di Belle Arti di Firenze =

Art academy in Florence, Italy

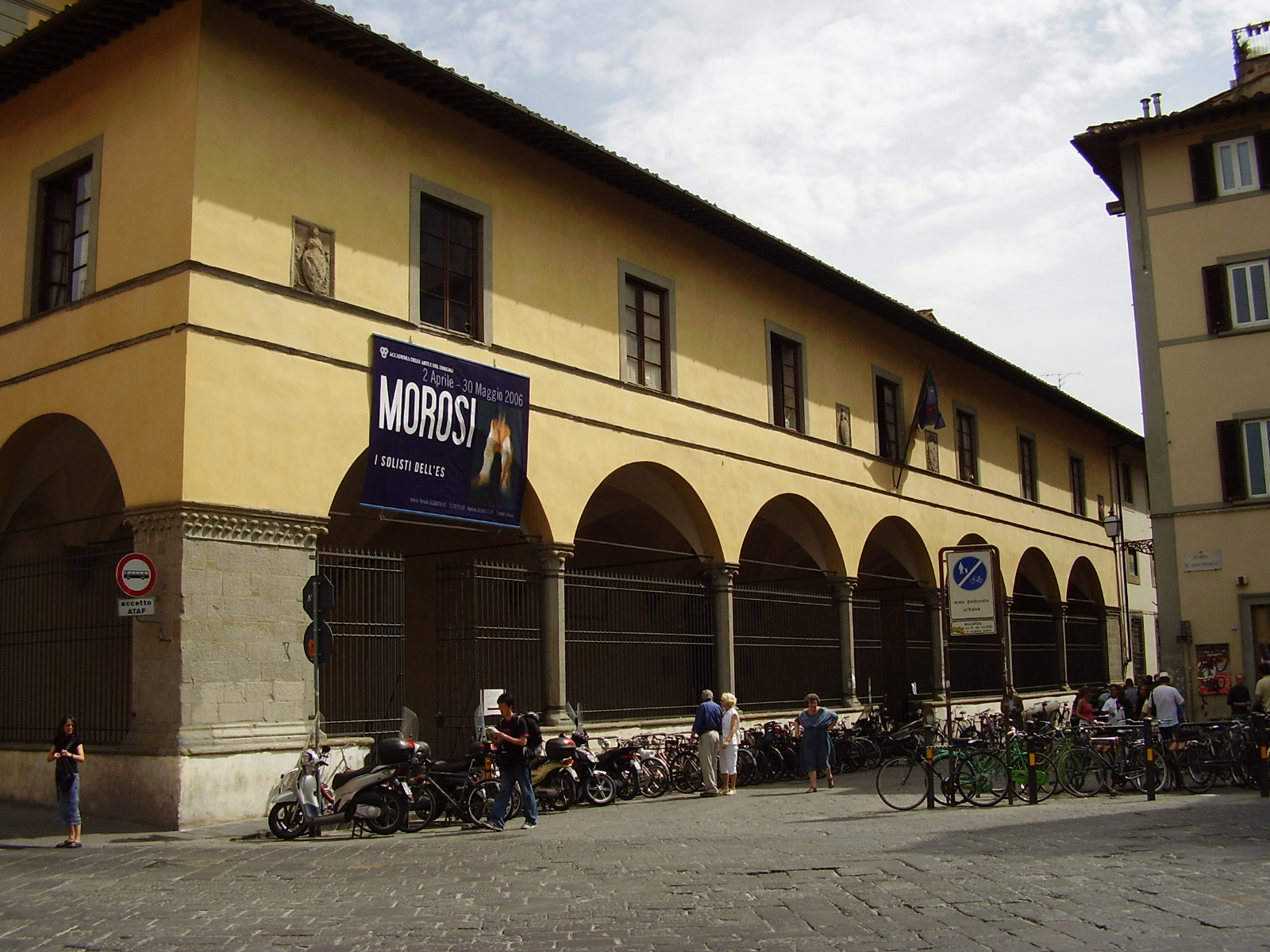
- The Accademia di Belle Arti seen from Piazza San Marco
- Type: Academy of fine arts
- Established: 1563; 463 years ago 1784 (combination)
- President: Carlo Sisi
- Director: Claudio Rocca
- Students: more than 1200
- Location: Florence, Tuscany, Italy; 43.7775°N 11.2592°E
- Website: accademia.firenze.it

The Accademia di Belle Arti di Firenze (lit. 'academy of fine arts of Florence') is an instructional art academy in Florence, in Tuscany, in central Italy.

It was founded by Cosimo I de' Medici in 1563, under the influence of Giorgio Vasari. Michelangelo, Benvenuto Cellini and other significant artists have been associated with it.

Like other state art academies in Italy, it became an autonomous degree-awarding institution under law no. 508 dated 21 December 1999, and falls under the administration of the Ministero dell'Istruzione, dell'Università e della Ricerca, the Italian ministry of education and research.

The adjacent (but unaffiliated) Galleria dell'Accademia houses the original David by Michelangelo.

== History ==
The Accademia e Compagnia delle Arti del Disegno, or "academy and company of the arts of drawing", was founded on 13 January 1563 by Cosimo I de' Medici, under the influence of Giorgio Vasari. It was made up of two parts: the company was a kind of guild for all working artists, while the academy was a more select group of artists responsible for supervision of artistic production in the Medici state. At first, the academy met in the cloisters of the Basilica della Santissima Annunziata.

Artists including Michelangelo Buonarroti, Lazzaro Donati, Francesco da Sangallo, Agnolo Bronzino, Benvenuto Cellini, Giorgio Vasari, Giovanni Angelo Montorsoli, Bartolomeo Ammannati, and Giambologna were members. Most members of the Accademia were male. Artemisia Gentileschi was the first woman to be admitted; Angelika Kauffmann became a member in 1762. The Accademia awarded Marianne Sessi a gold medal in 1807.

In 1784 Pietro Leopoldo, Grand Duke of Tuscany, combined all the schools of drawing in Florence into one institution, the new Accademia di Belle Arti, or academy of fine arts. It was housed in a former convent in via Ricasoli, premises which it still occupies.

In 1873 the accademia was divided into two separate bodies: the teaching institution, the Accademia di Belle Arti; and the college of academicians, which was named the Accademia delle Arti del Disegno.

In recent years, the academy has expanded its programs to include contemporary media and digital arts."Programs at Accademia di Belle Arti di Firenze".

== The Galleria dell'Accademia ==
The Galleria dell'Accademia was founded in 1784; it adjoins the Accademia di Belle Arti in via Ricasoli, but is otherwise unconnected with it. It has housed the original David by Michelangelo since 1873.

== See also ==
- List of academies of fine art in Italy
