= My Sister in Law =

Italian film directed by Lucio Fulci

- Italian film poster
- Directed by: Lucio Fulci
- Screenplay by: Franco Marotta; Laura Toscano
- Story by: Franco Marotta; Laura Toscano
- Produced by: Roberto Sbarigia
- Starring: Edwige Fenech; Raf Luca; Giancarlo Dettori
- Cinematography: Luciano Trasatti
- Edited by: Ornella Micheli
- Music by: Nico Fidenco
- Production company: Coralto Cinematografica
- Distributed by: Dear International (Rome)
- Release date: 11 November 1976 (Lecce)
- Running time: 98 minutes
- Country: Italy
- Language: Italian

My Sister in Law (Italian: La pretora, lit. 'The Magistrate') is a 1976 Italian commedia sexy all'italiana directed by Lucio Fulci and starring Edwige Fenech.

== Plot ==
Viola Orlando, a magistrate of a little town in Veneto, is inflexible and severe. Sworn enemies of the magistrate discover that her twin sister, Rosa, is a prostitute, so they try to get her to visit their city in an attempt to embarrass Viola. However, they wind up getting prosecuted, and Viola, with her head held high, gives up her robes and marries the man she loves.

== Cast ==
- Edwige Fenech as Judge Viola Orlando and Rosa Orlando
- Raf Luca as Raffaele Esposito
- Giancarlo Dettori as Count Renato Altero
- Mario Maranzana as Bortolon
- Carlo Sposito as the Prosecutor
- Walter Valdi as Zaganella
- Gianni Agus as Angelo Scotti
- Oreste Lionello as Francesco Lo Presti
- Lucio Fulci as the second gas station attendant

== Production ==
Producer Roberto Barigia stated that the film was made "out of the need to make a film starring Fenech, who at that time was a box-office star. Alas, we made it at the wrong time, as when we decided to try our hand at the genre Fenech's moment had already passed and her name was not so much of an asset as before."

La Pretora found director Lucio Fulci working with an irregular group of collaborators with only assistant director Roberto Giandalia who would go on to work as Fulci for nearly all of Fulci's films concluding with Murder Rock and editor Orenalla Micheli, the rest of the crew are not his regular collaborators. The film's screenplay was by husband-and-wife writing team Franco Marotta and Laura Toscano.

== Release ==
My Sister in Law was distributed theatrically in Rome by Dear International. It was not released in English-language theatres. According to Troy Howarth, a release in the United Kingdom was given the title My Sister in Law.

It was distributed in Lecce on November 11, followed by screenings in Bari on December 15, in Florence on November 12, in Genova on November 19, 1976 followed by a screening in Rome on January 6, 1977.
