= Death of Giorgiana Masi =

Italian activist killed during 1977 protest in Rome

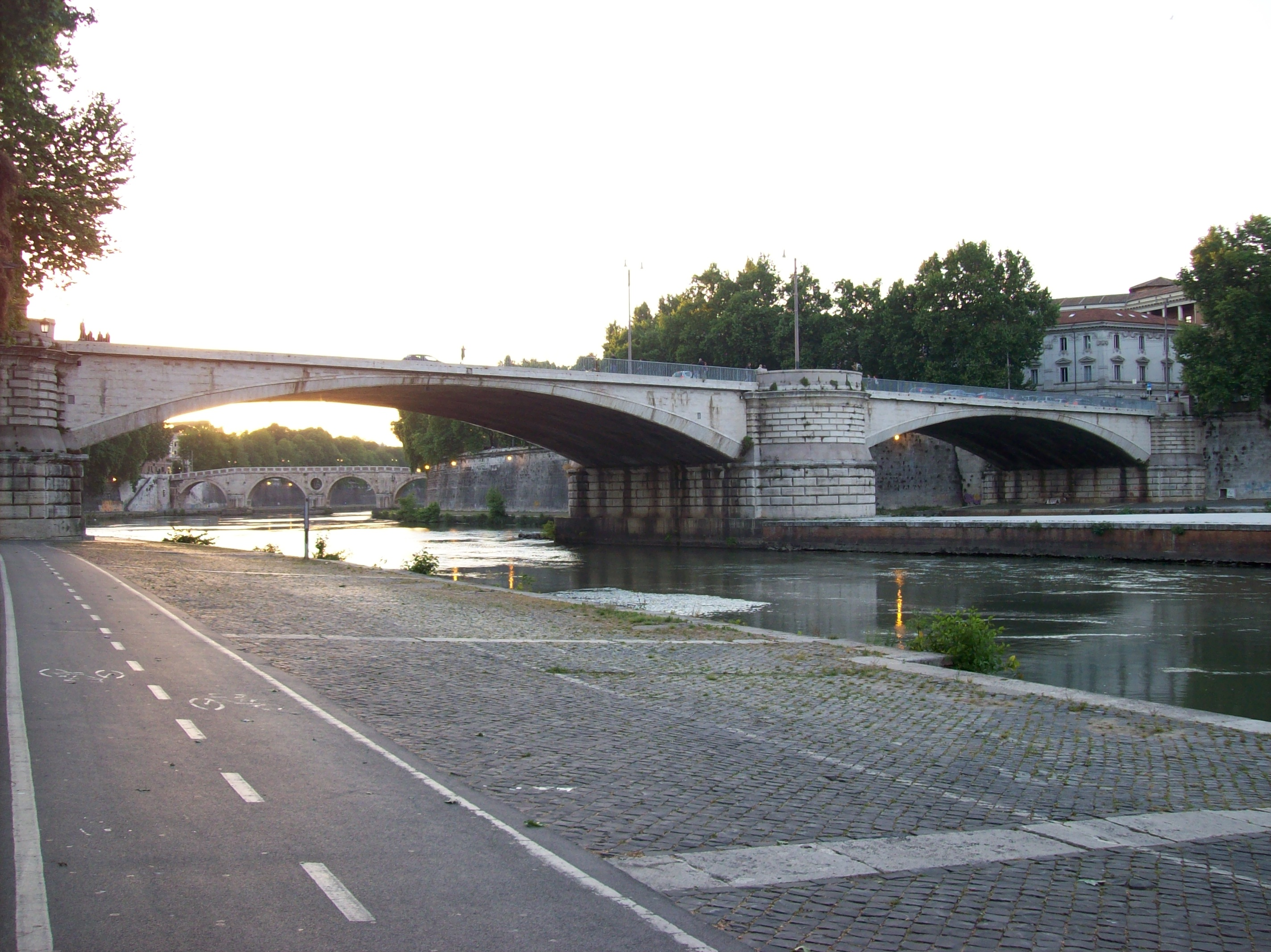
- A view of Ponte Garibaldi, where Masi died
- Date: 12 May 1977
- Location: Ponte Garibaldi, Rome
- Cause: Hit by a .22 caliber bullet to the back
- Outcome: No indictment
- Deaths: 1

Giorgiana Masi (6 August 1958 – 12 May 1977) was an Italian student and activist who was killed during a protest in Rome on 12 May 1977. The circumstances of her death are unclear.

== Background ==
=== The political climate ===
The violent political climate which characterized Italy in the 1970s was greatly noticeable in Rome. On 17 February 1977, clashes erupted at Sapienza University, when the student movement (including members of Indiani Metropolitani and Autonomia Operaia) violently opposed a speech by CGIL (Italian General Confederation of Labour) secretary Luciano Lama. On 12 March 1977, during a widely attended protest march, a gunfight between police officers and demonstrators was narrowly averted. On 21 April 1977, autonomist students tried once again to occupy Sapienza University. When police came to clear them, they responded with Molotov cocktails and gunfire.

In the confrontation that followed, police officer Settimio Passamonti was killed and three other officers were injured. The following day, Minister of the Interior Francesco Cossiga announced a city-wide ban on all public demonstrations, which lasted until the end of the month.

=== The victim ===
Born on 6 August 1958, Giorgiana Masi lived with her parents and older sister on Via Trionfale, Roma, near the San Filippo Neri hospital. In 1977, she was attending her fifth and last year at Liceo scientifico "L. Pasteur". A member of the Radical Party and feminist activist, Masi was attending the radical sit-in together with boyfriend Gianfranco Papini on 12 May 1977, when she was killed.

== Incident ==
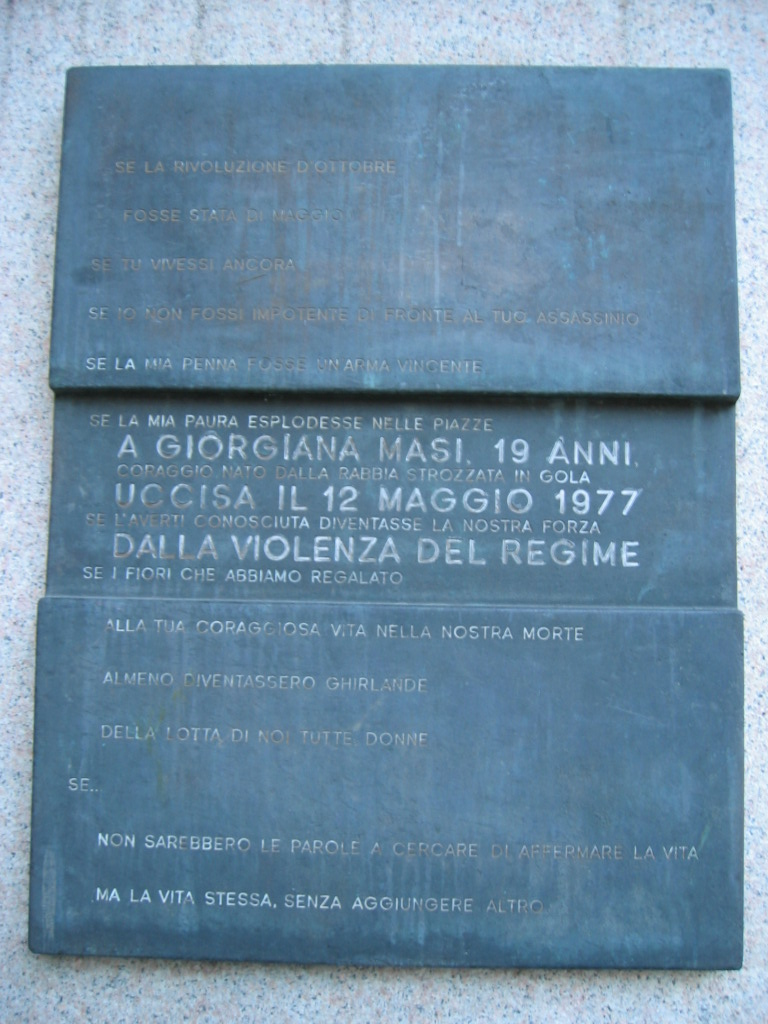
Plaque in memory of Giorgiana Masi on the Ponte Garibaldi in Rome.

On 12 May 1977, the Radical Party and the far-left organization Lotta Continua held a sit-in in Piazza Navona, Rome. The demonstration was aimed at protesting against recent measures banning public demonstrations celebrating the third anniversary of the divorce referendum and the collection of signatures supporting the upcoming referendums on party financing and public order. Activists were joined by students from the Movement of 1977 and members of Autonomia Operaia, some of which were armed. About 5,000 law enforcement agents gathered as well, supported by plainclothes officers hidden within the protesters' ranks.

Several incidents broke out during the afternoon. Around 2:00 pm, Piazza Navona was closed to traffic by police and incendiary bombs, tear gas and gunshots were fired. By 7:00 pm, mediation efforts by some members of Parliament appeared to have made a safe evacuation of the demonstrators possible, towards the rione of Trastevere through Garibaldi Bridge.

As the evacuation began, incidents got more serious. Gunshots and smoke bombs were fired. Police were lined up on the northern part of the bridge, on the side of Via Arenula, while protesters were running away southwards toward Piazza Belli. At 7:55 pm, during the turmoil, bystanders saw Giorgiana Masi fall to the ground as if tripping over, and put in a car which took her to the hospital, where she was pronounced dead. She had been shot in the back with a .22 caliber gun.

Though her assailant is unknown to this day, Marco Pannella and his Radical Party, on several occasions, made accusations against the Minister of the Interior, Francesco Cossiga, holding him to be morally responsible for Masi's death, stressing the presence of armed undercover agents among the protesters. Cossiga returned the accusation, claiming that Pannella was guilty of organizing the demonstration despite the well-known related risks.

== See also ==
- List of unsolved murders (1900–1979)
