= 1988 in Italy =

- Decades: 1960s; 1970s; 1980s; 1990s; 2000s
- See also: History of Italy; Timeline of Italian history; List of years in Italy

Events in Italy in 1988:

== Incumbents ==
- President of Italy: Francesco Cossiga
- Prime Minister of Italy: Giovanni Goria (until 13 April); Ciriaco De Mita (from 13 April)

== Events ==
- 29 May – World's first Pendolino train to enter regular high-speed service between Milan and Rome.
- 28 August – In an air show at the US Ramstein Air Base in Germany, three jets from the Italian air demonstration team, Frecce Tricolori, collide, sending a fireball into the ground. All three pilots and 67 spectators are killed, with a further 346 seriously injured.

== Sport ==
- 1988 Supercoppa Italiana
- 1988 Torneo di Viareggio
- 1988 Italian Grand Prix
- 1988 San Marino Grand Prix
- 1988 Italian motorcycle Grand Prix
- 1988 Giro d'Italia
- 1988 Italian Open (tennis)

== Film ==
- 52nd Venice International Film Festival

== Births ==
- 6 June – Arianna Errigo, fencer
- 5 August – Federica Pellegrini, swimmer
- 11 August – Giulia Manfrini, surfer and snowboarder (d. 2024)
- 25 December – Marco Mengoni, singer

== Deaths ==
- 1 May – Paolo Stoppa, actor (b. 1906)
- 15 May – Fulvia Franco, actress (b. 1931)
- 21 May – Dino Grandi, Minister of Foreign Affairs and Justice, president of the Parliament of Italy, and member of the Grand Council of Fascism (b. 1895).
- 24 June – Marta Abba, actress (b. 1900)
- 14 August – Enzo Ferrari, founder of Ferrari (b. 1898)
- 9 November – Mario Nasalli Rocca di Corneliano, Roman Catholic cardinal (b. 1903)
- 2 December – Tata Giacobetti, singer and lyricist (Quartetto Cetra) (b. 1922)
- 23 December – Carlo Scorza, Fascist politician (b. 1897)
