= Indiani Metropolitani =

Indiani Metropolitani (Metropolitan Indians) were a small faction active in the Italian far-left protest movement during 1976 and 1977, in the so-called "Years of Lead". A similar approach was called Stadtindianer (urban Indians) in Germany, during the German Autumn.

== Background ==
The Italian protest movement was born during the wave of protests in 1968, at the forefront of which were students, like at the University of California, Berkeley, and students and workers as in Paris in May 1968.

In Italy the 1968 student movement clashed violently with the police, and signalled the period known as "Years Of Lead" in Italy. Throughout the 1970s Italy was the theatre of terrorism and a climate of social and political upheaval. While the Red Brigades (Brigate Rosse) were a Marxist-Leninist terrorist group, Autonomia was a loose association of Marxists and anarchists. A figurehead was the philosopher Antonio Negri, considered the theorist of the movement, later imprisoned for suspected links with the Red Brigades and accused of having a moral responsibility for the violence associated with the Autonomists.

The apex of the movement took place in 1976 and 1977, and manifested itself with urban guerrilla activity, and occupations of universities, high schools and factories. The Indiani Metropolitani were the so-called creative wing of the movement. Its adherents wore face-paint like the war-paint of Native Americans and dressed like hippies. The emphasis was on "stare insieme" (be together), spontaneity and the arts, especially music. The group was active in Rome, during the occupation of the university La Sapienza in 1977. The main tribù was led by two young performers also ideologist strongly attracted by american Beat Generation led by Allen Ginsberg, Mario Appignani (Crazy Horse "Cavallo Pazzo") and Marco Erler (Red Cloud "Nuvola Rossa").The most famous episode of the period was the protest against a speech of left-wing union leader Luciano Lama, which ended in a riot with Lama and his supporters chased away. The Minister of The Interior Francesco Cossiga banned all demonstrations in Rome, but the ban was broken by the Radical Party and their demonstration ended in serious clashes between Autonomists and police for a whole day on March 12 and a high school student, Giorgiana Masi, was killed. In Bologna, where the Autonomists had a stronghold, tanks occupied the city following the killing of Francesco Lorusso by police which caused demonstrations and more guerrilla warfare by the Autonomists.

The German Stadtindindianer were closely connected to the Sponti scene in Germany, so Daniel Cohn-Bendit's journal Pflasterstrand called itself "Zeitschrift für Stadtindianer', the popular image of Native Americans in German-speaking countries applied as well to the leftist scene.

== End of the movement ==
Many of them, as the movement was on the wane, became active in the Centri Sociali, usually squatted premises to create a "free" space for young people to socialize and sponsor music and other artistic events. Many sit-ins, seminars and debates were also among the activities of these groups. The character of the Indiani Metropolitani was not just political, but included a rebellion against bourgeois values compounded by the clash of parents and adolescents - the so-called generation gap - and the adoption of different attitudes towards sexuality, social and political issues. Politically the Indiani might be described as anarchists, non-violent by principle but who retaliated in self-defence. The group included both individualist anarchists and those of a collective persuasion. The Indiani listened to rock music and adhered to the then common drug culture through the use mainly of cannabis and LSD. The Indiani Metropolitani disappeared with the end of the 1970s and are today remembered as a picturesque aspect of the protests of those years and the "Years Of Lead" in Italy.

== Sources ==
- Denis Mack Smith Storia D'Italia dal 1861 al 1977, Laterza, Roma-Bari, 1997.
- Marco Erler "Smoke signals", cult poetries on 1977, Campanotto editore, Udine, 1997.
- Paul Ginsborg, A History Of Contemporary Italy 1943-1988, Penguin, London, 1990.
- Armed Struggle In Italy 1976-1978, Elephant Editions, London, 1990.
- Gianfranco Sanguineti, On Terrorism And The State, Aldgate Press, London, 1982.
