= 1979 in Italy =

- Decades: 1950s; 1960s; 1970s; 1980s; 1990s
- See also: History of Italy; Timeline of Italian history; List of years in Italy

Events during the year 1979 in Italy

== Incumbents ==
- President – Sandro Pertini
- Prime Minister – Giulio Andreotti (until 5 August); Francesco Cossiga (after 5 August)

== Events ==
- 21 March – Fourth Andreotti government dissolved, Fifth Andreotti government formed.
- 5 August – First Cossiga government formed (this Cabinet lasts until April 1980).
- Tuscia University is founded.
- Milano Due residential neighborhood is completed.

== Births ==
- 10 January – Francesca Piccinini, volleyball player
- 16 February– Valentino Rossi, motorcycle racer
- 17 April –
  - Silvia Bosurgi, water polo player
  - Giusy Ferreri, singer and songwriter
- 4 May – Tania Di Mario, water polo player
- 19 May – Andrea Pirlo, football player and coach
- 22 May – Marracash, rapper
- 27 June – Fabrizio Miccoli, former professional footballer
- 13 July – Silvia Weissteiner, long-distance runner
- 25 September – Michele Scarponi, road racing cyclist
- 21 October – Vacca, rapper
- 13 November – Riccardo Scamarcio, actor and producer
- 17 December – Rosaria Console, runner

== Deaths ==
- 9 January – Pier Luigi Nervi, architect and engineer (b. 1891)
- 20 February – Nereo Rocco, Italian football player and manager (b. 1912)
- 17 March – Giacomo Lauri-Volpi, tenor (b. 1892)
- 10 April – Nino Rota, composer (b. 1911)
- 16 April – Maria Caniglia, spinto soprano (b. 1905)
- 2 May – Giulio Natta, Italian chemist, Nobel Prize laureate (b. 1903)
- 8 July – Tommaso Landolfi, author and translator (b. 1908)
- 21 August – Giuseppe Meazza, footballer and manager (b. 1910)
- 5 September – Alberto di Jorio, Italian Roman Catholic cardinal (b. 1884)
- 16 September – Gio Ponti, architect, designer, artist (b. 1891)
- 24 September – Vasco Bergamaschi, Italian road racing cyclist (b. 1909)
- 5 November – Amedeo Nazzari, actor (b. 1907)
- 21 December – Nino Pavese, Italian actor (b. 1904)
- 25 December – Mario Filippeschi, tenor (b. 1907)
