= Francesco Romoli =

Italian photographer (born 1977)

- Born: 27 May 1977 (age 49); Pisa, Italy
- Occupation: Photographer

Francesco Romoli (born 27 May 1977) is an Italian artist, based in Tuscany.

== Style ==
He combines photography with graphic design to create intriguing and surreal images, seeking to disconnect the photographic medium from reality.

== Education ==
Born in Pisa, Romoli studied computer science at the University of Pisa.

== Career ==
In his solo exhibition in Milan, at the MIA Fair in April 2015, the artist presented for the first time his series of Photographs Dark City, made by miniature scenes and dioramas of a fictional city.

He is known internationally for his series Imaginary Towns, created in 2013, a series of photographs made by cardboard.

== Personal life ==
He lives and works in Pisa.

== Awards and exhibitions ==
Romoli's works were selected for the Sony World Photography Awards 2014, exhibited at Somerset House in London.

In April 2014, Romoli's GIF Pandemonim: Death & Rebirth was presented at the Saatchi Gallery in occasion of the Saatchi Gallery and Google Plus Motion Photography Prize.

The works of Romoli have been presented in various art fairs, including the MIA Fair in Mila; the Photissima in Turin; and in Venice.

== See also ==
- List of graphic designers
- List of Italian artists
- List of photographers
