= Beniamino Placido =

Italian journalist, writer, and television critic

Beniamino Placido (1 February 1929 – 6 January 2010) was an Italian journalist, writer, and television critic.

He was a columnist on Italian culture for the newspaper La Repubblica and wrote three best selling books on television in the 1990s.

Placido died on 6 January 2010 at his home in Cambridge, Cambridgeshire, England.
