= Retecapri =

- Country: Italy
- Broadcast area: National
- Headquarters: Naples

Programming
- Language: Italian
- Picture format: 576i SDTV

Ownership
- Owner: Television Broadcasting System

History
- Launched: 1982
- Closed: June 28, 2022

Retecapri was an Italian television channel, that broadcast entertainment and information programs, music, and teleshopping. The channel belonged to Television Broadcasting System.

== History ==
The channel was founded at the end of 1982. TBS had decided to create a second television network shortly after the arrival of the flagship broadcaster Telecapri in the Italia 1 network: in fact Telecapri was planned to rebroadcast the national schedule, and Retecapri would produce their own content, allowing them to preserve and continue to develop content created independently in Capri.

Until 1985, Retecapri offered quality programs, such as Peyton Place, The Strange Couple, The Addams Family, Get Smart, Laverne and Shirley, as well as the famous Cinque Punto Zero block led by Uffi and Teresa Iaccarino, featuring a number of anime shows.

In May 1983, Retecapri made an agreement with TV PORT to provide, for 18 months, its programming offer.

In the mid-1980s, when Telecapri left Italia 1 and went to Euro TV (which, unlike the previous network, left the local networks wide spaces of autonomy), the majority of TBS' activities and acquisitions poured back into the flagship network, leaving Retecapri deprived of the majority of programming. The station began looking for its own identity.

From the end of 1985 to September 1987, the brand Retecapri was joined by Music & Cinema. At this time, programming was mainly focused on music videos, alternating with films: these expansion years made Caprese TV, already visible in the center-south of Italy, a national network, especially in certain zones: in particular in the city of Turin where it was receivable since at least the spring of 1985, thanks to its affiliation with Quartarete. In Milan, it was broadcast from early 1988, through Italab TV, whose frequencies were officially transferred to Retecapri in the early 90s.

In September 1987, the station went back to general programming until 1998, with films, television films, telenovelas, anime, documentaries, teleshopping and since 1991 a newscast by Teresa Iaccarino, with national services curated by TBS' Roman offices and international services in collaboration with CNN.

Following the regulation of Italian television broadcasting that came with the Mammì law, Retecapri took part in 1992 for the tender for the assignment of nine national television concessions to private individuals: however, it was classified in an unhelpful position (the licenses for Canale 5, Italia 1, Rete 4, Videomusic, Rete A, Telemontecarlo and the three Telepiù networks were awarded).

With the transition to digital, Retecapri was assigned the national virtual channel number 20, consisting of local TV stations and new semi-generalist channels. Several times in its press releases the channel protested against this decision and requested channels 8 or 9, arguing that neither MTV nor DeeJay TV have the right to those positions, failing to meet the requirement of "analogue national generalist channel".

Retecapri proposed, in addition to the TG and information programs (such as Piazza Montecitorio, Pianeta Salute, New Magazine), The F.B.I. and Finder of Lost Loves, the science fiction block Film da un altro mondo, the film block Un sogno in Bianco e Nero at 9:00 p.m. and another movie at 10:30 p.m.

In April 2017, Television Broadcasting System sold Retecapri to Mediaset.

On May 5, 2017, the channel was added to the Mediaset 2 mux where it started broadcasting with Mediaset's ownership at 8:00 p.m. with Milagros. The programming is made up of Mediaset's library and soap operas.

After the sale of Retecapri, TBS transferred the programming to a new channel called Capri Television.
