= Casa Cecilia =

Italian television series

- Directed by: Vittorio De Sisti
- Composers: Pippo Caruso; Guido & Maurizio De Angelis
- Country of origin: Italy
- No. of seasons: 3
- No. of episodes: 20

Production
- Cinematography: Erico Menczer

Original release
- Network: Rai 1
- Release: 1982 – 1987

Casa Cecilia is an Italian television series. It aired on Rai 1 for three seasons in prime time: in 1982, in 1983 under the title Casa Cecilia (un anno dopo), and in 1987 under the title Casa Cecilia (Anno 3°).

== Cast ==
- Delia Scala: Cecilia
- Giancarlo Dettori: Aldo Tanzi
- Davide Lepore: Ugo Tanzi
- Stefania Graziosi: Terry Tanzi
- Claudio Mazzenga: Gabriele Tanzi
- Zoe Incrocci: Rina
- Alida Valli (first season)

== See also ==
- List of Italian television series
