= Lazzaro Donati =

Italian painter (1926–1977)

Lazzaro Donati

Lazzaro Donati (January 8, 1926 – 1977) was an Italian painter.

== Early life and education ==
Lazzaro Donati was born in Florence on January 8, 1926. He attended the Florence Academy of Fine Arts and obtained a doctor's degree in economics from the University of Florence.

== Career ==
He began to paint in 1953, and in 1955 held his first exhibition at the Indiano Gallery in Florence. Within three years eleven exhibitions followed in Italy, and as his reputation grew he was invited to give major exhibitions in London, Paris, New York, Chicago, Rio de Janeiro and Montevideo. He was also a sculptor and photographer, and he published two books of his photographs in the Famous Cities of the World Series on Venice and Florence.

=== Style ===
Maternita 1968

Donati insisted on a tidy studio and did not allow paint to spot its surface. He said that "Painting is a matter of precision. If a painter can’t put his paint where he wants it to go, I don’t see how he can call himself a painter. For me it is absolutely necessary to control the paint."

Donati's early works indicated a momentary interest in surrealism and abstract art; they were predominantly two dimensional, depending on line and strong color. But by 1958, with his painting "The Lady with a Fan", a work which he had hung in a place of honor on his balcony, came a dedicated change of style. There was a new interest in volume, and a particular taste for curved forms. He did not practice the major schools of contemporary painting.

Rather than using a canvas, Donati painted on specially treated wood panels laid flat on a table. He painted backgrounds before sketching the forms with a special crayon and then returning to his paints. Finally, he completed his work with light additions of color he called "lumi", and archaic Italian word meaning “lights”, to accentuate the sense of volume.

Donati used four palettes when painting, for earth colors, high tones, and two others with a variety of colors that he used to keep track of them. His most frequently recurring subjects were the nude, the still-life, and the cityscape. He incorporated many round forms, and he preferred painting female figures and curved church buildings for this reason. He often returned to a bowl of fruit as inspiration for his still-life paintings.

== Personal life ==
Donati lived and worked at 24 Piazza Donatello in Florence. Donati used the main studio to paint and to receive clients. He preferred to speak on subjects extraneous to his art before demonstrating the paintings. He spoke fluent French and English as well as some Spanish and German. Explaining this, he said that "you've got to know how to sell a painting to everyone."

Donati died in 1977.
