= 1974 in Italy =

- Decades: 1950s; 1960s; 1970s; 1980s; 1990s
- See also: History of Italy; Timeline of Italian history; List of years in Italy

Events from the year 1974 in Italy.

== Incumbents ==
- President – Giovanni Leone
- President of the Senate – Giovanni Spagnolli
- President of the Constitutional Court – Francesco Paolo Bonifacio

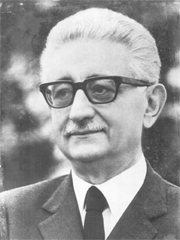
Giovanni Leone, president of Italy

== Events ==
- January – An investigation into a neo-fascist network known as ComRose was launched. Several high-ranking army officers were implicated, including a retired general and a lieutenant colonel on subversion charges.
- 10 March – A ban on private automobiles on alternate days based on odd/even license plates went into effect, replacing the Sunday ban introduced in December of the previous year.
- 18 April – Prosecutor Mario Sossi was kidnapped in Genoa by the left-wing militant organization Red Brigades. The Red Brigades threatened to kill him unless an imprisoned bank robber was released. He was released on 23 May after negotiations.
- 12 May – The 1974 Italian divorce referendum was held over two days. Voters were asked whether to repeal the 1970 divorce law, which would have outlawed divorce. The proposal was defeated by a margin of 59.26% to 40.74%, with a voter turnout of 87.72%.
- 16 May–9 June – The 57th Giro d'Italia was held. Belgian cyclist Eddy Merckx won the race, with Italians Gianbattista Baronchelli and Felice Gimondi finishing second and third.
- 26 May–3 June – The 1974 Italian Open was held in Rome. Third-seeded Björn Borg won the men's singles title, defeating defending champion Ilie Năstase in the final.
- 28 May – Piazza della Loggia bombing: A bomb exploded in Piazza della Loggia in Brescia, Lombardy, during an anti-fascist demonstration. Seven people were killed immediately and over 90 were injured; two more victims later died. The attack was attributed to the neo-fascist group Ordine Nero (Black Order). The square was washed down shortly after the explosion, hampering the collection of evidence.
- 30 May – Police exchanged machine-gun fire with suspected right-wing extremists at a paramilitary training camp at Piano di Rascino in the Apennine Mountains. One suspect was killed and two surrendered. The group identified itself as National Vanguard.
- 2 June – The alternate-day driving ban ended.
- 6 July – The government passed austerity decrees to combat inflation and reduce the trade deficit. Measures included increasing the price of gasoline, introducing taxes on vehicles and luxury goods, and raising the value-added tax (VAT) on beef and other basic items.
- 4 August – Italicus Express bombing: A bomb exploded in the fifth carriage of the Italicus Express night train as it traveled from Rome to Munich, killing 12 people and injuring 48. The attack occurred near the exit of the San Benedetto Val di Sambro tunnel in Emilia-Romagna. Responsibility was claimed by Ordine Nero.
- 8 September – The Italian Grand Prix was held at Monza. Ronnie Peterson won the race driving for Lotus.
- 23 November – The fourth Moro government was sworn in, ending a 51-day political crisis. The incoming center-left government was led by Prime Minister Aldo Moro.
- 2 December – Prime Minister Aldo Moro outlined an economic program to Parliament. The program aimed to fight inflation (which was at nearly 25%), reduce imports, increase exports, and rationalize energy consumption. Moro stated that his government would not seek an alliance with the Italian Communist Party.

== Births ==
- 9 November – Alessandro Del Piero, footballer

== Deaths ==
- 3 January – Gino Cervi, actor (born 1901)
- 7 March – Alberto Rabagliati, singer and actor (born 1906)

== See also ==
- Years of Lead (Italy)
- History of Italy
