= Marco Panzetti =

Italian photojournalist

Marco Panzetti (born 1981, in Bergamo, Italy) is a documentary photographer, multimedia journalist and visual artist whose work focuses on the socio-environmental impact of contemporary issues related to the globalization process.

== Career ==
Marco Panzetti is a freelance documentary photographer, multimedia journalist and visual artist. His work focuses on the socio-environmental impact of contemporary issues related to the globalization process. With his projects, he looks into new migration paradigms, mass tourism and fast urbanization.

He carried out projects in Europe, Latin America and Asia, frequently in collaboration or on assignment for nonprofit organizations and magazines. He also works with different audiovisual formats (video, audio and VR) to create short documentary films, immersive multimedia pieces and installations.

At the beginning of his career in photography, he was apprentice to the photographer Michel Huneault and worked as his personal assistant in 2014 and 2015.

Among other publications, his work appeared in BBC News, The Times, Vice, British Red Cross, LA Times, Internazionale, New Statesman, Diari Ara, Tages-Anzeiger, and the Sydney Morning Herald.

His long-term body of work on the European migrant crisis, 'The Idea of Europe' (2015 – present) received international recognition including an Honorable Mention at the 2017 Lange-Taylor Prize and the first prize in the video category at the 2017 Migration Media Award.

== Awards and recognition ==
- 2020. #Venice. Semifinalist, Documentary Essay Prize from Duke University
- 2020. Single Photo. Advanced rounds of judging, World Press Photo - General News Singles
- 2019. Life after Hell. Finalist, Photography 4 Humanity
- 2019. In Between. Finalist, Festival della Fotografia Etica – Single Shot Award
- 2019. Out of Thin Air. Curatorial Selection, PX3 Prix de la Photographie Paris – “State of the World” category
- 2019. Out of Thin Air. Finalist, PhotOn Festival
- 2019. Life after Hell. Shortlisted, Portrait of Humanity
- 2019. Out of Thin Air. Honorable Mention, Focus on the Story Festival
- 2019. Out of Thin Air. Shortlisted, Kolga Tbilisi Photo Festival
- 2018. The Idea of Europe. Semi-finalist, Lange-Taylor Prize from Duke University
- 2018. The Idea of Europe. Shortlisted, Premio Marco Pesaresi
- 2018. The Idea of Europe. Shortlisted, Lugano Photo Days
- 2018. The Idea of Europe. 2nd place, Imagely Fund Humanitarian Photography Grant
- 2018. Life after Hell. Winner, Spanish National Photojournalism Award.
- 2017. The Idea of Europe. Honorable Mention, Lange-Taylor Prize from Duke University
- 2017. In Between. Finalist, Festival della Fotografia Etica – Single Shot Award: Solidarietà Fertile
- 2017. In Between. Shortlisted, Felix Schoeller Award
- 2017. In Between. First Prize Winner, Migration Media Awards – Video category
- 2017. In Between. Shortlisted, Athens Photo Festival
- 2016. In Between. Contest Winner, 'Closer 2016 – Dentro il reportage' by Witness Journal
- 2016. We are not going back. Shortlisted, Athens Photo Festival
- 2015. We are not going back. Selected, Visa pour l'Image Festival – ANI's Coup de Coeur section

== Exhibitions ==
- 2021. Tōhoku 2.0. Fukushima, 10 years later. University of Bologna, Nippop, Orizzontinternazionali. Virtual Exhibition (group)
- 2020. Life after Hell. Portrait of Humanity. Travelling exhibition, Europe + Latin America + Stratosphere (group)
- 2020. Corsica: Sisters in arms. Cafébabel - Blueborder. Travelling exhibition, France + Germany + Virtual Exhibition (group)
- 2019. Life after Hell. Photography 4 Humanity. United Nations Headquarters, New York City, USA (group)
- 2019. In Between. Festival della Fotografia Etica 2019. Lodi, Italy (group)
- 2019. Out of Thin Air. PX3 Prix de la Photographie Paris – “State of the World” exhibition. Espace Beaurepaire, Paris, France (group)
- 2019. In Between. SOS Méditerranée/City of Geneva Exhibition. Quai Wilson, Geneva, Switzerland (group)
- 2018. The Idea of Europe. Assises Internationales du Journalisme. Théâtre du 4e Art, Tunis, Tunisia (solo)
- 2018. Life after Hell. International Peace Day. Sant Boi de Llobregat – Barcelona, Spain (solo)
- 2017. In Between. Festival della Fotografia Etica 2017 – Single Shot Award: Solidarietà Fertile. Lodi, Italy (group)
- 2017. Mediterranean Dispatches (from In Between). Festival della Fotografia Etica 2017 – OFF Section. Lodi, Italy (group)
- 2017. In Between. 2017 Photogenic Festival. Barcelona, Spain (solo)
- 2017. In Between. Félix Houphouët-Boigny Peace Prize for SOS Méditerranée. UNESCO building, Paris, France (group)
- 2017. In Between. Mediterraneo Downtown Festival. Logge del Palazzo Comunale, Prato, Italy (group)
- 2017. In Between. IsoLab, Taranto, Italy (solo)
- 2017. In Between. Arsenale della Marina Regia, Palermo, Italy (group)
- 2017. In Between. QR Photogallery, Bologna, Italy (group)
- 2016. We are not going back. Pati Llimona, Barcelona, Spain (solo)
