= Antenna Tre Nordest =

Antenna 3 Nordest
- Country: Italy
- Broadcast area: Triveneto

Programming
- Language: Italian
- Picture format: 4:3 SDTV

Ownership
- Owner: Gruppo Medianordest

History
- Launched: 25 February 1978

Links
- Website: https://antennatre.medianordest.it

Availability

Terrestrial
- Digital: LCN 13

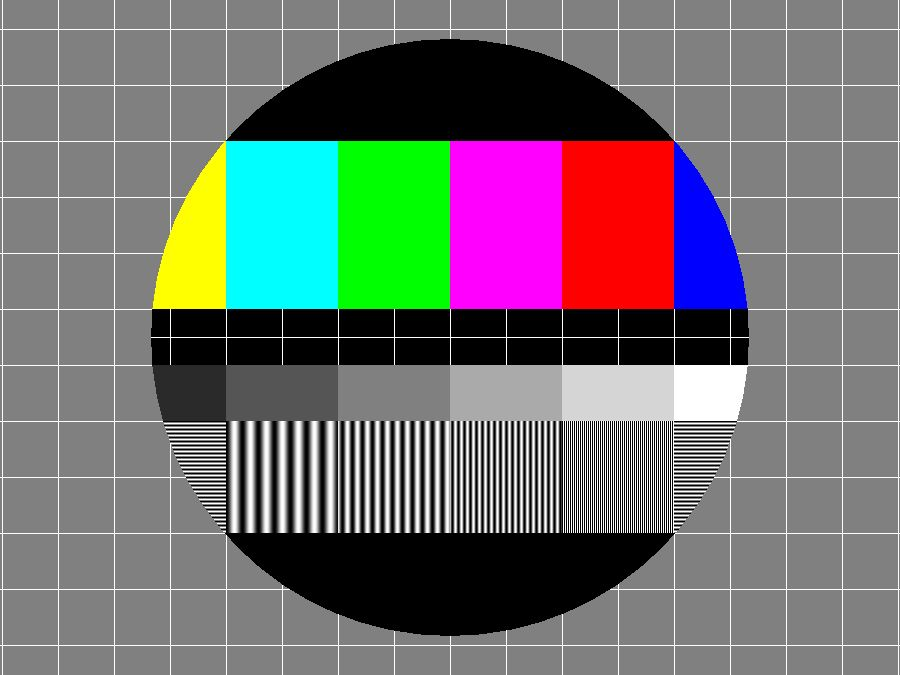
Recreation of the Antenna Tre Veneto colour test card, used from December 1978 until the 1990s.

Antenna 3 is an Italian regional television channel of Veneto owned by Gruppo Medianordest. It transmits a light entertainment program: movies, news and weather bulletins on LCN 13.

Other channels of Medianordest are Reteveneta, TeleNordest and Telequattro.

== Programs in italian ==
- A Marenda
- X news
- Oasi di Salute
- La Piazza
- Meteo
- Parola alla Difesa
- Parliamone con Kira

== Staff ==
- Luigi Bacialli
- Ferdinando Avarino
