= Alessio Ferrazza =

Italian football midfielder (born 1986)

Personal information
- Full name: Alessio Ferrazza
- Date of birth: 26 January 1986 (age 40)
- Height: 1.82 m (5 ft 11 1/2 in)
- Position: Midfielder

Team information
- Current team: FC Chiasso

Senior career*
| Years | Team | Apps | (Gls) |
| 2007–2008 | AC Bellinzona | 10 | (1) |
| 2008–present | FC Chiasso | | |
- * Club domestic league appearances and goals as of 22 June 2008

Alessio Ferrazza (born 26 January 1986) is an Italian football midfielder who currently plays for FC Chiasso.
