= Lea Del Bo Rossi =

Italian medical researcher

- Born: Lea Del Bo; 4 March 1903; Cassano Magnago, Italy
- Died: 1978 (aged 74–75)
- Other name: Lea Rossi Del Bo
- Education: University of Pavia
- Occupation: Medical researcher
- Parents: Luigi Del Bo (father); Adele Mazzucchelli (mother)

Lea Del Bo Rossi (1903–1978), also known as Lea Rossi Del Bo, was an Italian medical researcher who studied clinical microscopy and neurohistopathology.

== Life and work ==
Lea Del Bo was born on 4 March 1903 in Cassano Magnago, Italy, to Adele Mazzucchelli and Dr. Luigi Del Bo. After high school, she enrolled at the Faculty of Medicine at the University of Pavia and studied clinical microscopy and neurohistopathology with Camillo Golgi (1843–1926), Luigi Sala (1863–1930), Edoardo Perroncito (1847–1936) and Scipione Riva-Rocci (1863–1937). She graduated with honours in 1925.

To continue her thesis research on multiple sclerosis after graduation, she began attending the neurohistopathological laboratory of the Mondino Foundation, directed at that time by the psychiatrist Ottorino Rossi (1877–1936), of whom she would become a pupil and life partner. At some point, Lea added "Rossi" to her own name, but in an inconsistent way, sometimes before her maiden name and sometimes after. In Del Bo's obituary, neurologist Giuseppe Carlo Riquier referred to Ottorino Rossi as "her husband."

She conducted clinical research as a doctor at the Provincial Psychiatric Institute of Milan, and published papers on psychiatric therapy, spinal cord automatism, cerebral echinococcosis, treatment of progressive paralysis with penicillin, regeneration nervosa and psychasthenia. There she worked with the institute's director, Max Beluffi.

Beginning in the late 1940s, she explored "a staining method based on a Coz-silver impregnation technique, of which she presented the data in various articles in the Experimental journal of freniatria and The brain." She published her results in, The nervous system studied with a new technique, published in two parts in 1949 and 1950, and included many photomicrographs in her publications. In a review of Del Bo's work by Carlo Berlucchi, he said her technique was "capable of revealing figures not yet taken into evidence of nerve cells and fibres".

Del Bo Rossi's research on tumours revealed their "rich innervation," and she formulated a hypothesis on the infectious origin of cancer. Some of her results were met with conflicting opinions, but Lea vehemently held her ground. One of her patrons, Beluffi, said in his obituary for Del Bo Rossi that she responded, "with the caustic and pugnacious spirit that characterised her, never shied away" from the "lively interpretative polemics" that accompanied her writings.

Del Bo Rossi published a collection of her most significant research in 1974, just a few years before she died, hoping to publicise her contributions and finally obtain the visibility and public recognition that she felt had escaped her. Her collection, The nervous system studied with a new technique, Consents and evaluations, included comments from some of her followers, both domestic and international.

== Selected works ==
She published many (but not all) of her research using the last name "Rossi Del Bo" and sometimes did not capitalize the first letter in "Del."

- Rossi Del Bo, Lea. Tumours are innervated, "Experimental journal of phreniatria", 1948
- Rossi Del Bo, Lea. Study of a fibroplastic meningioma, "Experimental journal of phreniatria", 1948
- Rossi Del Bo, Lea. The nervous system studied with a new technique, Milan, Tip. A. Lucini and C., 1949
- Rossi Del Bo, Lea. The nervous system studied with a new technique, fasc. II, Milan, Tip. A. Lucini and C., 1950
- Rossi Del Bo, Lea. Letter to cancerologists, Milan, Tip. A. Lucini and C., 1950
- Rossi Del Bo, Lea. Communication to scholars of the “cancer problem”, Milan, Tip. A. Lucini and C., 1950
- del Bo Rossi, Lea. "Autorreferat über das Buch" Il sistema nervoso studiato con una nuova tecnica. Acta Neurovegetativa 1.1 (1950): 106–113.
- Rossi Del Bo, Lea. Mikroskopie, Wien, Band 6 / Heft 7/8, 1951
- Del, Bo R. L. "La Coscienza Della Forma." (1955). Print.
- Rossi Del Bo, Lea. Indication of dehydrocolic acid in high doses as a therapeutic agent for malignant tumours, Bulletin of the Italian society of experimental biology, Vol. XXXIX, fasc. 14, 1963
- Rossi Del Bo, Lea. The nervous system studied with a new technique. Consents and evaluations, Milan, 1974.
