= Paola Mosca Barberis =

Italian alpine skier (born 1977)

Paola Mosca Barberis (born 12 August 1977) is an Italian retired alpine skier.

She competed at the 1995 Junior World Championships, a 14th place her best result.

She competed on the FIS Alpine Ski World Cup circuit in the 1996–97 and 1998–99 seasons, collecting her first World Cup points in December 1998 in Veysonnaz when finishing 29th in the downhill event.
