= 1983 Italian regional elections =

Regional elections were held in some regions of Italy during 1983. These included:

- Aosta Valley on 26 June;
- Friuli-Venezia Giulia on 26 June;
- Trentino-Alto Adige on 20 November.
