= Bruno Cirino =

Italian actor (1936–1981)

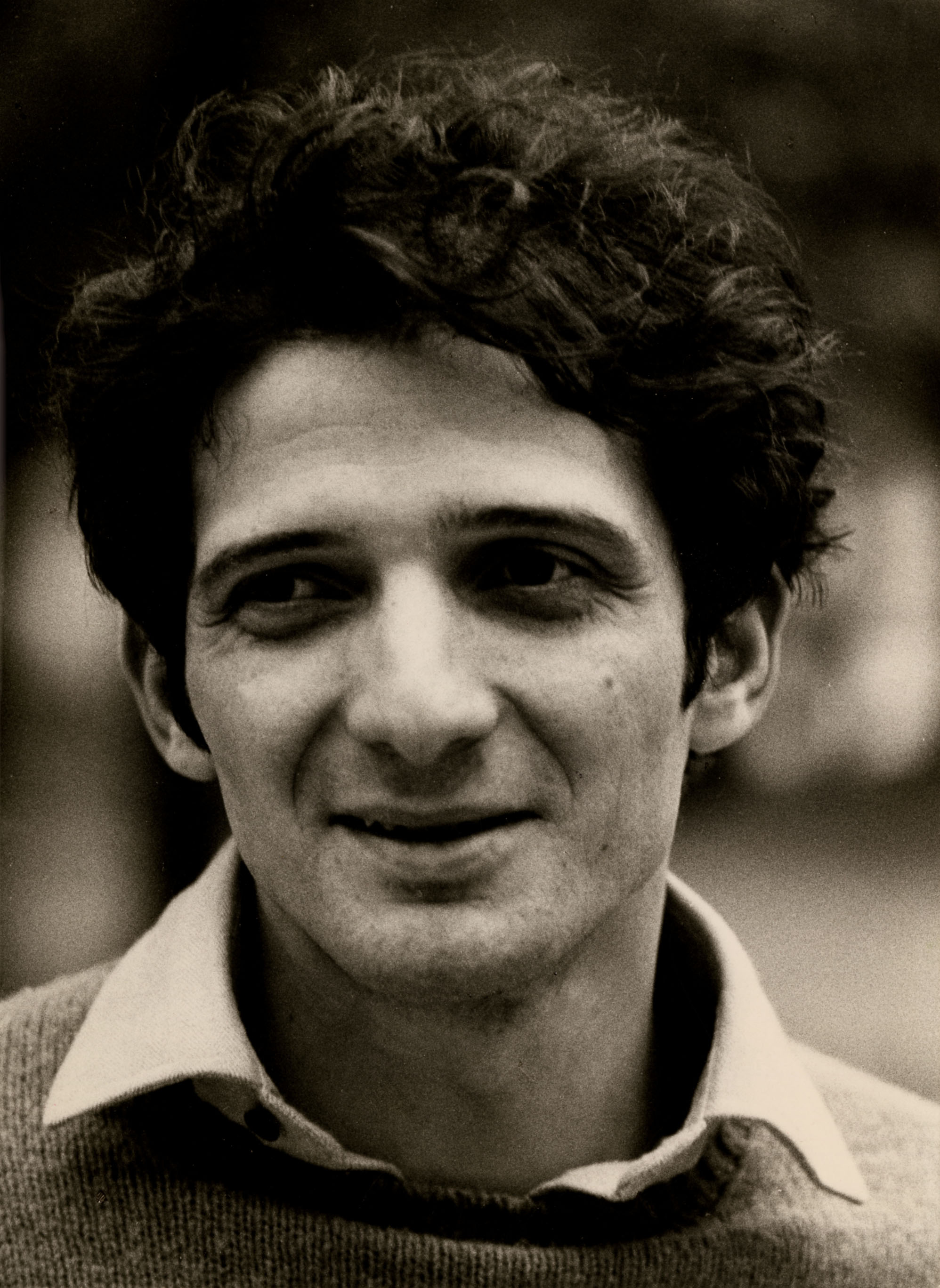
- Born: Bruno Cirino Pomicino; 25 October 1936; Naples, Italy
- Died: 17 April 1981 (aged 44); Vercelli, Italy
- Occupation: Actor

Bruno Cirino (25 October 1936 – 17 April 1981) was an Italian actor and stage director.

== Life and career ==
Born Bruno Cirino Pomicino in Naples, Cirino abandoned his studies in law to enroll the Silvio d’Amico Academy of Dramatic Arts in Rome. After graduating, in 1961 he started his career on stage, notably working with Franco Zeffirelli, Eduardo De Filippo, Giorgio De Lullo and Orazio Costa. In the 1970s he founded the theatrical company Teatroggi, also serving as a stage director. Starting from the late 1960s Cirino was also active in films and on television, particularly getting a large critical acclaim for his performance in Vittorio De Seta's Diary of a Schoolteacher (1972). He died prematurely at the age of 44, after suffering a heart attack while he was driving his car on the way back from a theatrical tour.
