= Vittorio De Sisti =

Italian film director and screenwriter

- Born: 23 November 1940; Libya
- Died: 22 April 2006 (aged 65); Rome, Italy
- Occupation(s): Screenwriter, film director

Vittorio De Sisti (23 November 1940 – 22 April 2006) was a Libyan-born Italian director and screenwriter.

Born in Darna, Libya, De Sisti entered the cinema industry in 1962 as a sound engineer. In 1966, after graduating from the Centro Sperimentale di Cinematografia, he was assistant director Marco Bellocchio and began directing documentaries. In 1968 he debuted as a director, giving up his career as a sound engineer. In the late 1970s De Sisti focused his career on television. He was married to actress and playwright Lucia Vasilicò.

== Selected filmography ==
- Fiorina la vacca (1972)
- When Love Is Lust (1973)
- Private Lessons (1975)
- La supplente va in città (1979)
- Casa Cecilia (1982)
- Delitti e profumi (1988)
