= 1986 in Italy =

- Decades: 1960s; 1970s; 1980s; 1990s; 2000s
- See also: History of Italy; Timeline of Italian history; List of years in Italy

Events from the year 1986 in Italy

== Incumbents ==
- President: Francesco Cossiga
- Prime Minister: Bettino Craxi

== Events ==
- 10 February - The Maxi Trial, a criminal trial against the Sicilian Mafia begins in Palermo, Sicily.

== Births ==
- 26 January – Alessio Ferrazza, Italian footballer
- 6 July – Luigi Di Maio, politician
- 12 August – Chiara Galiazzo, singer
- 20 August – Letizia Ciampa, voice actress
- 12 November – Ignazio Abate, footballer

== Deaths ==
- 19 February – Adolfo Celi, actor and director (b. 1922)
- 14 April – Jole Bovio Marconi, archaeologist and prehistorian (b. 1897)
- 15 May – Elio de Angelis, racing driver (b. 1958)
- 23 May – Altiero Spinelli, politician (b. 1907)

== See also ==
- 1986 in Italian television
- List of Italian films of 1986
