= Constitutional Arch =

Political term in post-war Italy

The Constitutional Arch (Italian: arco costituzionale) was a term used in the post-war Italian political discourse to describe the parties that had taken part in the drafting and approval of the Italian Constitution and persisted as a loose coalition on certain policymaking issues. According to historian Claudio Pavone, the arch was the informal heir to the National Liberation Committee (CLN), which had been established in 1943 to represent the anti-fascist parties that would go on to form the political leadership of post-war Italy. Even if the left-wing parties had been expelled from the government coalition in 1947 under American orders over the Marshall Plan amid the Cold War, the anti-fascist arch survived as a consensus on parliamentary institutions and the exclusion of the neo-fascist Italian Social Movement (MSI) from government roles and political influence. The concept became prominent after the fall of the controversial Tambroni government in 1960, and was used throughout the 1960s and 1970s.

The arch included Christian Democracy (DC), the Italian Communist Party (PCI), the Italian Socialist Party (PSI) and its splinter Italian Democratic Socialist Party (PSDI), the Italian Liberal Party (PLI), and the Italian Republican Party (PRI). These were all the major parties at the time with the exception of the Monarchist National Party (PNM) and the MSI. The Action Party (PdA), which had a significant role in the resistance movement and contributed to the works of the Constituent Assembly of Italy, disbanded in 1947 and is thus not included in the definition.

The main effect was to establish an asymmetry between the two wings of the opposition. While the PCI was effectively excluded from government posts and hypothetical coalitions until its dissolution in 1991, it nonetheless played an important role in policymaking through its participation in parliamentary committees and local administrations, while neo-fascists were consistently marginalised in political life. One of the last overt expressions of the constitutional arch was the 1978 Italian presidential election of former partisan leader Sandro Pertini as president of the Italian Republic in 1978, with the largest majority in a presidential vote in Italian history.

The constitutional arch was challenged in the late 1970s by Bettino Craxi, the new leader of the PSI, who demanded sweeping constitutional reforms, an option hitherto rejected by major parties, and offered the chairmanship of the board of elections of the Chamber of Deputies to the MSI. The arch finally ended in the early 1990s, with the collapse of all of its member parties and the decision of Silvio Berlusconi to found the Pole of Good Government, a coalition that included the PSI and its post-fascist successors.

== Bibliography ==
- Bevilacqua, Piero, ed. (1994). Lezioni sull'Italia repubblicana (in Italian). Donzelli Editore. ISBN 88-7989-070-0.
- Cingari, Salvatore (2007). Cultura democratica e istituzioni rappresentative. Due esempi a confronto: Italia e Romania. Firenze University Press. ISBN 88-8453-562-X – via Google Books.
- Raniolo, Francesco (2004). Le trasformazioni dei partiti politici (in Italian). Rubbettino Editore. ISBN 88-498-1126-8 – via Google Books.
