= Francesco Lorusso =

Italian militant

- Born: Pierfrancesco Lorusso; October 7, 1952; Bologna, Italy
- Died: March 11, 1977 (aged 24); Bologna, Italy
- Cause of death: Shot dead by carabinieri
- Organisation: Lotta Continua
- Known for: Far-left militancy
- Opponent: Communion and Liberation

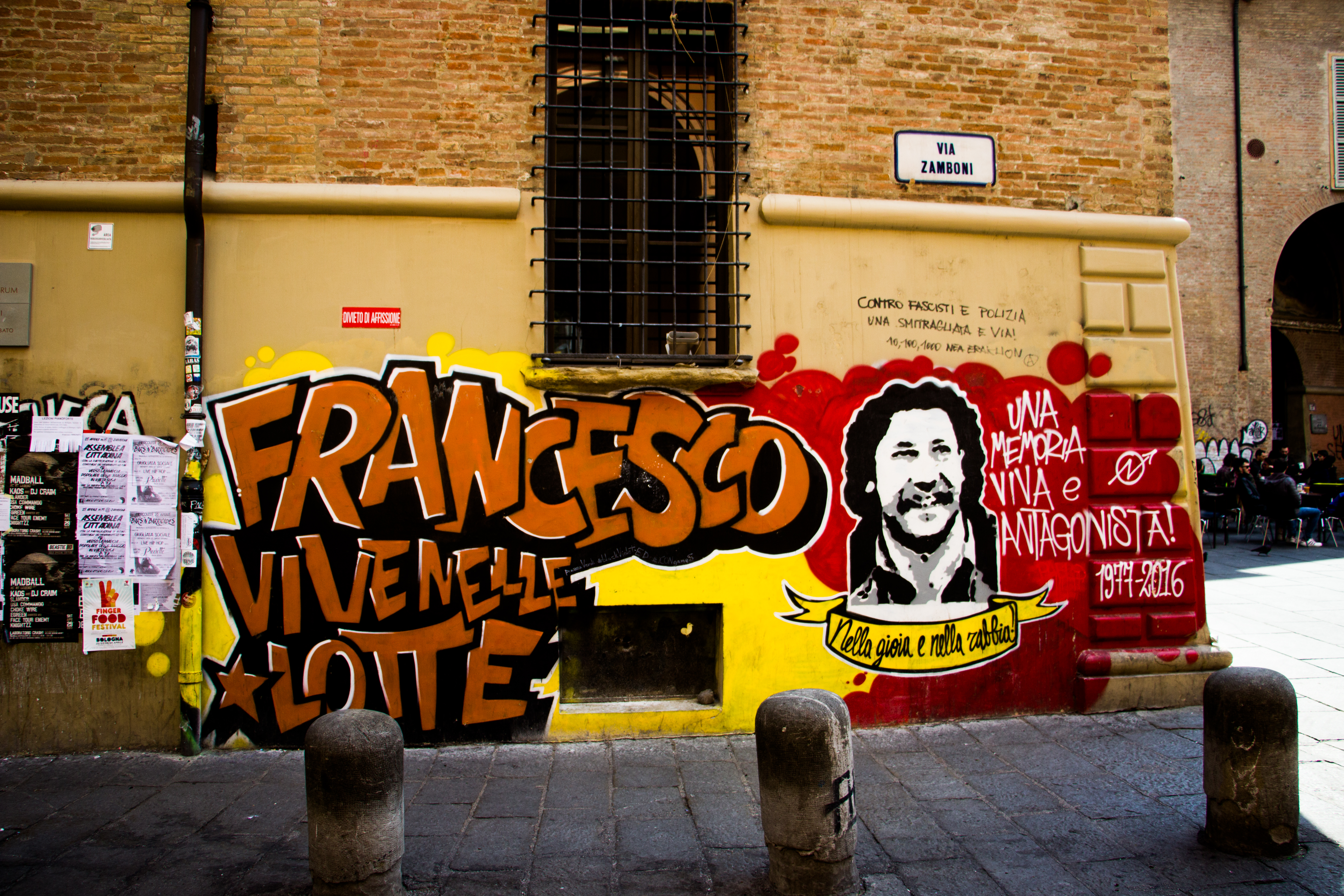
A Mural of Francesco Lorusso

Pierfrancesco Lorusso (7 October 1952 – 11 March 1977), generally known as Francesco Lorusso, was an Italian militant of the far-left organization Lotta Continua who was shot dead by carabinieri in Bologna on 11 March 1977 during the riots of that year.

== Death ==
Lorusso was killed when police intervened during a confrontation between left-wing militants and Communion and Liberation, a right-wing militant Catholic group. The then Prime Minister of Italy Giulio Andreotti remarked on TV, that this killing was "normal and inevitable". The Italian Communist Party (PCI), the dominant political party in Bologna, did not participate. The only historical left-wing organization that took part in the funeral of Lorusso was the Youth Socialist Federation, with its secretary Emilio Lonardo.
