= Gianfranco Faina =

Italian professor

Gianfranco Faina was an Italian professor. His early experiences were first in the communist party, following his departure from which he participated in many political groups, such as the "workers-students league" where the separation between workers and intellectuals was eliminated. He had a pivotal role in the creation of Italian Operaism Movements.

Faina taught history at the University of Genoa when the city was the centre of the July 1960 uprising. He did political work with Classe Operaia (Working Class Party) for a time before doing political work with 'working class autonomy' and anarchist groups during the 1970s. In this part of his life, the Azione Rivoluzionaria group was created. He also supported the group "XXII Ottobre" acting in Genova.

On 9 November 1977, an arrest warrant was issued against Faina by the Milan Judiciary for his alleged involvement with the left-wing group Azione Rivoluzionaria. After briefly absconding, Faina was subsequently apprehended and jailed in La Spezia prison, where he later died of cancer on February 11, 1981.
