= Giancarlo Dettori =

Italian actor (1932–2026)

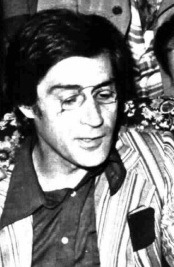
- Dettori in 1974
- Born: 5 April 1932; Cagliari, Italy
- Died: 9 February 2026 (aged 93); Milan, Italy
- Occupation: Actor
- Years active: 1957–2026

Giancarlo Dettori (5 April 1932 – 9 February 2026) was an Italian actor. He appeared in more than thirty films from 1957 onwards. Mainly a theatrical actor, starting from 1957 and for the following four decades, he was part of numerous productions of the Piccolo Teatro in Milan under the direction of Giorgio Strehler, starting with the historic Harlequin servant of two masters by Carlo Goldoni, in which he plays a tasty Silvio Lombardi full of jokes and improvisations. For television, in 1976 he presented, with Enza Sampò, the variety show Insieme, pretending nothing had happened, while in 1984 he hosted, together with Marina Perzy, the second edition of the television quiz Giallo sera. In 1982, he participated in the television series Casa Cecilia. He married the actress Franca Nuti and had two children.

Dettori died on 9 February 2026, at the age of 93.

== Selected filmography ==
Year	Title	Role	Notes
1976	My Sister in Law		
1976	L'affittacamere		
1992	Damned the Day I Met You	Attilio	
1993	Quattro bravi ragazzi		
