= Barbara Labate =

Italian entrepreneur and business executive

- Born: 1978 (age 47–48)
- Occupations: Entrepreneur and business executive

Barbara Labate (born c. 1978) is an Italian entrepreneur and business executive. She co-founded and heads the first Italian comparative-pricing website, Risparmio Super, which, as of 2015, covers 10,000 stores and has over 300,000 users.

== Biography ==
After graduating in political science at the University of Messina in 1999, Labate continued her studies at Columbia University, New York City, where she earned her master's degree in 2003, thanks to a Fulbright Scholarship.

From 2004 to 2010, Labate was a director at the Milan-based company McKay & Sisters, where, among other things, she developed an application for sending virtual prayer cards to mobile phones. Over the years, she has launched and supported several start-ups, but her greatest success has been Risparmio Super (literally Super Saver), which she set up in 2010. It immediately hit the Italian AppStore list and has since prospered, especially as a result of the system's ability to read the bar code on a product and immediately display comparative prices. SuperSaver has a team of 13 people divided between Catania and Milan.

Labate has also been a leading executive at the non-profit association Italia Startup.

== Awards ==
In 2013, Barbara Labate with her Risparmio Super won the Lady Pitch Night competition in Paris, which selects the best European female-founded startup. The event is arranged by Girls in Tech and Orange. In 2015, she was selected by Inspiring Fifty as one of the 50 most inspiring women in the European technology community.
