= 1978 Italian referendums =

A double referendum was held in Italy on 11 and 12 June 1978. Voters were asked whether they approved of the repealing of laws on political party financing and public order. Both proposals were rejected.

== Police powers abrogative referendum ==
Results of the police powers referendum by province. Blue indicates a major in favour; red indicates a majority against.

The Reale Law was approved by the Parliament in 1975 and defined the powers and engagement of the Italian police during riots or simple street protests. The referendum was called by the Radical Party and supported by two extreme opposition parties, the Italian Social Movement on the right side, and Proletarian Democracy on the left, together with the Italian Liberal Party, while all other parties, including the Italian Communist Party, supported retaining the law.

=== Results ===
Choice	Votes	%
Yes	7,400,619	23.54
No	24,038,806	76.46
Invalid/blank votes	2,050,263	–
Total	33,489,688	100
Registered voters/turnout	41,248,657	81.19
Source: Ministry of the Interior

The referendum was rejected by the Italian electors, following the positions of all the parties of the so-called Constitutional Arch.

== Party funding abrogative referendum ==
Results of the party funding referendum by province. Blue indicates a major in favour; red indicates a majority against.

The other question concerned the party funding Piccoli Law was the subject of one question. The new law was passed by the Parliament in 1974, establishing public funding of the parliamentary parties in an attempt to stop the funding of parties big industrial groups and interests. The referendum was called by the Radical Party and was supported by Proletarian Democracy and the Italian Socialist Party, whilst the remainder of the political spectrum were against its abolishment.

=== Results ===
Choice	Votes	%
Yes	13,691,900	43.59
No	17,718,478	56.41
Invalid/blank votes	2,078,312	–
Total	33,488,690	100
Registered voters/turnout	41,248,657	81.19
Source: Ministry of the Interior

The referendum was rejected by the Italian electors, but the percentage was considerably smaller than the expected result considering the parliamentary positions.
