= Post-Fordism =

State of industry since the late 20th century

Post-Fordism describes a shift in production methods that emerged in the 1980s in response to the stagnation and profitability crisis of Fordist production, which had become rigid, bureaucratic, and less profitable. Post-Fordism is defined by flexible production, the individualization of labor relations and fragmentation of markets into distinct segments. The concept of post-Fordism was originally invented by the economist Robin Murray in the British magazine Marxism Today in 1988.

The concept of "Fordism", as a distinct phase in the history of capitalist industrialization, was first developed by Antonio Gramsci in 1934. It gained further attention through Michel Aglietta's book Régulation et crises du capitalisme in 1976. Since the 1980s, the labels of "Fordism" and "post-Fordism" have been widely adopted by labor economists in Europe and North America. However, the exact definition of post-Fordism remains debated among scholars.

Fordism was the leading business model for industrial mass production by corporations roughly from the 1910s to the 1960s, adopted during the great expansion of the manufacturing sector in North America, Europe and Japan (see also scientific management and time and motion study). Characteristics of Fordism was a division of work tasks according to the assembly-line model perfected by Henry Ford, and the in-house organization at one large plant location of almost everything required for the enterprise to function (from machinery, manufacture and administration to cleaning, catering and maintenance). Some theorists of post-Fordism argue that the end of the superiority of the US economy is explained by the end of Fordism, across most of the world, and its replacement by more competitive and efficient production models invented mainly in Japan.

Post-Fordist production is a competitive business approach which aims to respond quickly, precisely and effectively to the existence of increased consumer choice as well as to the increased importance of the identity and personal development concerns that individuals have (as employees and as consumers). For this purpose, a great deal of effort goes into collecting consumer data and business data using information technology, to understand what the business trends and changes in consumer demand are. Post-Fordist production networks require much greater flexibility from their workforces, providing more variation in job roles for employees, more individualized labour relations, and more flexible production techniques such as lean manufacturing.

Unlike Fordist enterprises, which concentrate nearly all production on-site, in one location, the post-Fordist enterprises act as a hub in a network of smaller, specialized organizations spread across different locations (nationally and internationally). Each organization contributes a specific input or service under contractual agreements. Many administrative, technical and maintenance tasks which are not considered to be part of the "core business" are outsourced. The post-Fordist model is often more cost-effective, competitive, and flexible, because resources are only held or used when needed, allowing businesses to adapt more quickly to market changes.

Given that not all of the production process is centralized in one site, post-Fordist enterprises usually involve a mix of subsidiaries (owned by the parent company) and out-sourced contractors. This can make it difficult for outsiders to see how the whole system operates; unlike a typical Fordist factory, a lot of the work is not visibly carried out in one single location, building, or office, or company.

== Overview ==
Post-Fordism is characterized by the following attributes:

- Small-batch production
- Economies of scope
- Specialized products and jobs
- Use of new information technologies
- Greater emphasis on types of consumers and market segments
- The increase of all sorts of service workers and white collar workers
- The feminisation of the work force

=== Consumption and production ===
Post-Fordist consumption is marked by individualism and consumer choice. Patterns of consumption are oriented toward lifestyle and identity and consumption is a key part of the culture. The consumer or customer needs has become the central factor which determines the organization of production. Data-driven retailers analyze a large amount of consumer data to anticipate and respond to changing patterns of consumer demand. In that sense, there is a strong affinity between post-Fordism and the rise of information technology, because information technology becomes essential to develop business strategies.

Post-Fordist production prioritizes increased flexibility, in particular lean production and just-in-time production methods. This creates an economic geography of greater interaction between suppliers, manufacturers, wholesalers, retailers and customers. In post-Fordist labor markets, there a shift from workers in fixed roles within the division of labor to workers who are more adaptable to performing different roles in production. It may lead also to greater involvement by workers in the whole labor process, and greater autonomy of workers in their own work. There is an increase in "non-standard" forms of employment which are suited to changing work tasks.

The typical Post-Fordist enterprise has three main strata of employees: (1) the core managerial staff, technocrats, and other skilled specialists with permanent labour contracts, (2) the regular production workers on annual (renewable) contracts, and (3) part time and casual employees on temporary contracts, who are brought in to perform project work, support and maintenance tasks, and specialized tasks, for a limited time. Workers may have fewer labour rights, but greater freedoms at work, and they are hired and fired according to their perceived performance and the amount of work that needs to be done.

== Theoretical approaches ==
According to geographer Ash Amin, the academic study of post-Fordism is commonly divided into three schools of thought: the regulation school, flexible specialization, and neo-Schumpeterianism.

=== Regulation school ===
The regulation approach (also called the neo-Marxist or French Regulation School) was designed to address the paradox of how capitalism has both a tendency towards crisis, change and instability as well as an ability to stabilize institutions, rules, and norms. The theory is based on two key concepts. "Regimes of Accumulation" refer to systems of production and consumption, such as Fordism and post-Fordism. "Modes of Regulation" refer to the written and unwritten laws of society which control the Regime of Accumulation and determine its form.

According to regulation theory, every Regime of Accumulation will reach a crisis point at which the Mode of Regulation will no longer support it, and society will be forced to find new rules and norms, forming a new Mode of Regulation. This will begin a new Regime of Accumulation, which will eventually reach a crisis, and so forth. Proponents of Regulation theory include Michel Aglietta, Robert Boyer, Bob Jessop, and Alain Lipietz.

=== Flexible specialization ===
Proponents of the flexible specialization approach (also known as the neo-Smithian approach) believe that fundamental changes in the international economy, especially in the early 1970s, forced firms to switch from mass production to a new tactic known as flexible specialization.

Instead of producing generic goods, firms now found it more profitable to produce diverse product lines targeted at different groups of consumers, appealing to their sense of taste and fashion. Instead of investing huge amounts of money in the mass production of a single product, firms now needed to build intelligent systems of labor and machines that were flexible and could quickly respond to the whims of the market. The technology associated initially with flexible production was numerically controlled machine tools. The development of the computer was very important to the technology of flexible specialization. Not only could the computer change the characteristics of the goods being produced, but it could also analyze data to order supplies and produce goods in accordance with current demand. These types of technology made adjustments simple and inexpensive, making smaller specialized production runs economically feasible. Flexibility and skill in labor were also important. The workforce was now divided into a skill-flexible core and a time-flexible periphery. Flexibility and variety in the skills and knowledge of the core workers and the machines used for production allowed for the specialized production of goods. Modern just-in-time manufacturing is one example of a flexible approach to production.

Likewise, the production structure began to change on the sector level. Instead of a single firm manning the assembly line from raw materials to finished products, the production process became fragmented as individual firms specialized in their areas of expertise. As evidence for this theory of specialization, proponents claim that Marshallian "industrial districts," or clusters of integrated firms, have developed in places like Silicon Valley, Jutland, Småland, and several parts of Italy.

=== Neo-Schumpeterianism ===
The new-Schumpeterian approach to post-Fordism is based upon the theory of Kondratiev waves (also known as long waves). The theory holds that a "techno-economic paradigm" (Perez) characterizes each long wave. Fordism was the techno-economic paradigm of the fourth Kondratiev wave, and post-Fordism is thus the techno-economic paradigm of the fifth, which is dominated by information and communication technology.

Notable neo-Schumpeterian thinkers comprise Carlota Perez and Christopher Freeman, as well as Michael Storper and Richard Walker.

=== Post-Fordist theory in Italy ===
In Italy, post-Fordism has been theorised by the long wave of workerism or autonomia. Major thinkers of this tendency include the Swiss-Italian economist Christian Marazzi, Antonio Negri, Paolo Virno, Carlo Vercellone, Maurizio Lazzarato. Marazzi's Capital and Language takes as its starting point the fact that the extreme volatility of financial markets is generally attributed to the discrepancy between the "real economy" (that of material goods produced and sold) and the more speculative monetary-financial economy. But this distinction has long ceased to apply in the post-Fordist New Economy, in which both spheres are structurally affected by language and communication. In Capital and Language Marazzi argues that the changes in financial markets and the transformation of labor into immaterial labor (that is, its reliance on abstract knowledge, general intellect, and social cooperation) are two sides of a new development paradigm: financialization through and thanks to the rise of the new economy.

In terms of the development of the 'technical and political class-composition', in the post-Fordist era the crisis explains at the same time 'high points of the capitalist development' and how new technological tools develop and work altogether (money form, linguistic conventions, capital and language).

== Changes from Fordism to post-Fordism ==
Post-Fordism brought on new ways of looking at consumption and production. The saturation of key markets brought on a turn against mass consumption and a pursuit of higher living standards. This shift brought a change in how the market was viewed from a production standpoint. Rather than being viewed as a mass market to be served by mass production, the consumers began to be viewed as different groups pursuing different goals who could be better served with small batches of specialized goods. Mass markets became less important while markets for luxury, custom, or positional goods became more significant. Production became less homogeneous and standardized and more diverse and differentiated as organizations and economies of scale were replaced with organizations and economies of scope.

The changes in production with the shift from Fordism to post-Fordism were accompanied by changes in the economy, politics, and prominent ideologies. In the economic realm, post-Fordism brought the decline of regulation and production by the nation-state and the rise of global markets and corporations. Mass marketing was replaced by flexible specialization, and organizations began to emphasize communication more than command. The workforce changed with an increase in internal marketing, franchising, and subcontracting and a rise in part-time, temp, self-employed, and home workers. Politically, class-based political parties declined and social movements based on region, gender, or race increased. Mass unions began to vanish and were instead replaced by localized plant-based bargaining. Cultural and ideological changes included the rise in individualist modes of thought and behavior and a culture of entrepreneurialism. Following the shift in production and acknowledging the need for more knowledge-based workers, education became less standardized and more specialized. Prominent ideologies that arose included fragmentation and pluralism in values, post-modern eclecticism, and populist approaches to culture.

== Examples ==
=== Italy ===
One of the primary examples of specialized post-Fordist production took place in a region known as the Third Italy. The First Italy included the areas of large-scale mass production, such as Turin, Milan, and Genoa, and the Second Italy described the undeveloped South. The Third Italy, however, was where clusters of small firms and workshops developed in the 1970s and 1980s in the central and northeast regions of the country. Regions of the Third Italy included Tuscany, Umbria, Marche, Emilia-Romagna, Veneto, Friuli, and Trentino-Alto Adige/Südtirol. Each region specialized in a range of loosely related products and each workshop usually had five to fifty workers and often less than ten. The range of products in each region reflected the post-Fordist shift to economies of scope. Additionally, these workshops were known for producing high quality products and employing highly skilled, well-paid workers. The workshops were very design-oriented and multidisciplinary, involving collaboration between entrepreneurs, designers, engineers and workers.

=== Japan ===
There were several post-World War II changes in production in Japan that caused post-Fordist conditions to develop. First, there were changes to company structure, including the replacement of independent trade unions with pro-management, company-based unions; the development of a core of permanent male multi-skilled workers; and the development of a periphery of untrained temporary and part-time employees, who were mostly female. Second, after World War II, Japan was somewhat isolated because of import barriers and foreign investment restrictions, and as a result, Japan began to experiment with production techniques. Third, as imported technologies became more available, Japan began to replicate, absorb, and improve them, with many improvements deriving from modifications for local conditions. Fourth, Japan began to concentrate on the need for small-batch production and quick changeover of product lines to serve the demand for a wide range of products in a relatively small market. Because of informal price-fixing, competition was based not on price but rather on product differentiation. As a result, production became less standardized and more specialized, particularly across different companies. Fifth, Japan began to build long-term supply and subcontracting networks, which contrasted with the vertically integrated, Fordist American corporations. Sixth, because small and medium-size manufacturers produced a wide range of products, there was a need for affordable multipurpose equipment as opposed to the specialized, costly production machinery in Fordist industries in the United States. Technology for flexible production was significant in Japan and particularly necessary for smaller producers. The smaller producers also found it necessary to reduce costs. As a result, Japan became one of the main users of robots and CNC. Over time, these six changes in production in Japan were institutionalized.

== Criticisms ==
The main criticism of post-Fordism asserts that post-Fordism mistakes the nature of the Fordist revolution and that Fordism was not in crisis, but was simply evolving and will continue to evolve. Other critics believe that post-Fordism does exist, but coexists with Fordism. The automobile industry has combined Fordist and post-Fordist strategies, using both mass production and flexible specialization. Ford introduced flexibility into mass production, so that Fordism could continue to evolve. Those who advocate post-Fordism, however, note that criticism that focuses primarily on flexible specialization ignores post-Fordist changes in other areas of life and that flexible specialization cannot be looked at alone when examining post-Fordism. Another criticism is that post-Fordism relies too heavily on the examples of the Third Italy and Japan. Some believe that Japan is neither Fordist nor post-Fordist and that vertical disintegration and mass production go hand in hand. Others argue that the new, smaller firms in Italy did not develop autonomously, but are a product of the vertical disintegration of the large Fordist firms who contracted lower value-added work to smaller enterprises. Other criticisms argue that flexible specialization is not happening on any great scale, and smaller firms have always existed alongside mass production. Another main criticism is that we are too much in the midst to judge whether or not there really is a new system of production.

The term "post-Fordism" is gradually giving way in the literature to a series of alternative terms such as the knowledge economy, cognitive capitalism, the cognitive-cultural economy and so on. This change of vocabulary is also associated with a number of important conceptual shifts (see sections above).

== See also ==
- Civil society
- Social innovation
- Total quality management
