= Franco Berardi =

Italian philosopher and activist (born 1949)

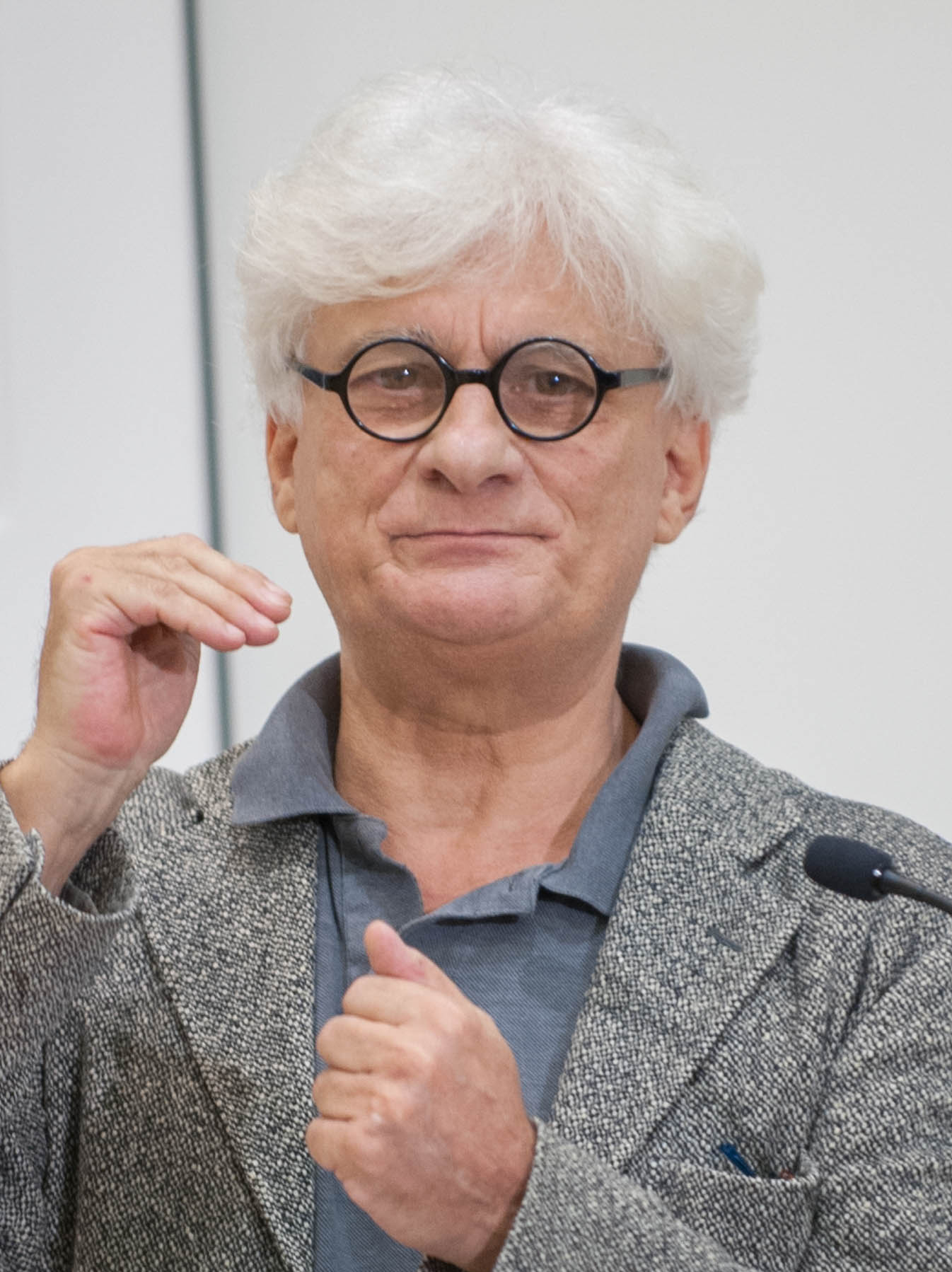
- Berardi in 2016
- Born: 2 November 1949 (age 76); Bologna, Italy
- Other names: Bifo

Education
- Education: University of Bologna

Philosophical work
- Era: Contemporary philosophy
- Region: Western philosophy
- School: Continental philosophy; Autonomist Marxism
- Institutions: Accademia di Belle Arti di Brera; GCAS
- Notable works: The Soul at Work: From Alienation to Autonomy (2009)

Franco "Bifo" Berardi (born 2 November 1949) is an Italian Marxist philosopher, theorist and activist in the autonomist tradition, whose work mainly focuses on the role of the media and information technology within post-industrial capitalism. Berardi has written over two dozen published books, as well as a number of essays and speeches.

== Creative work and activism ==
In 1962, at the age of 13, Berardi became a member of the Italian Communist Youth Federation, but was expelled due to "factionalism." He participated in the events of May 68 at the University of Bologna, where he graduated with a degree in Aesthetics. During this time he joined the extra-parliamentary group Potere Operaio and met Antonio Negri. Berardi founded the magazine A/traverso in 1975 and worked with the magazine until 1981, when it reached its high point of publishing. He was also part of the staff of Radio Alice, the first free pirate radio station in Italy, from 1976 to 1978.

Like others involved in the political movement of Autonomia in Italy during the 1970s, Berardi fled to Paris, where he worked with Félix Guattari in the field of schizoanalysis. During the 1980s, Berardi contributed to the magazines Semiotexte (New York), Chimerees (Paris), Metropoli (Rome) and Musica 80 (Milan). During the 1990s, he published Mutazione e Ciberpunk (Genoa, 1993), Cibernauti (Rome, 1994), and Félix (Rome, 2001). He has also collaborated with artists such as Warren Neidich and publications such as e-flux in the contemporary arts field. Currently he is working with the magazine Derive Approdi as well as teaching social history of communication at the Accademia di belle Arti in Milan. He is the co-founder of the e-zine rekombinant.org and of the telestreet movement, founding the channel Orfeo TV.

== Philosophy ==
Unlike orthodox Marxists, Berardi's autonomist theories draw on psychoanalysis, schizoanalysis and communication theory to show how subjectivity and desire are bound up with the functioning of the capitalist system, rather than portraying events such as the 2008 financial crisis merely as an example of the inherently contradictory logic of capitalist accumulation. Thus, he argues against privileging labour in critique and says that "the solution to the economic difficulty of the situation cannot be solved with economic means: the solution is not economic." Human emotions and embodied communication become increasingly central to the production and consumption patterns that sustain capital flows in post-industrial society, and as such Berardi uses the concepts of "cognitariat" and "info labour" to analyze this psycho-social process. Among Berardi's other concerns are cultural representations and expectations about the future—from proto-Fascist Futurism to post-modern cyberpunk (1993). This represents a greater concern with ideas and cultural expectations than the determinist-materialist expression of a Marxism which is often confined to purely economic or systemic analysis. He also pioneered the idea of "Semiocapitalism," which is a discussion of the role that semiotics play in our capitalist system, and is a critique of the issues this causes. The primary component of this theory is the depression of the psyche that is caused by the exponentially increasing rate of proliferation of semiotics and symbols in to the cybersphere for the sake of profits.

== The Uprising and Breathing ==
Two of Berardi's books, The Uprising and Breathing, are closely related speculative works which treat the 2008 financial crisis, financial capitalism and the subsequent protest movements of the early 21st century such as Occupy Wall Street and the Arab Spring. In both works Berardi criticizes neoliberal financial capitalism, claiming that its supporting infrastructure of automation (e.g. computer trading on the stock market)—together with standardized computer language conventions on social media (e.g. the like button on Facebook)—hollow out language to the detriment of human actors who naturally communicate in more sensuous and subjective ways. As remedies Berardi suggests poetry and "chaos"—citing the elegies of Rilke and Guattari's work on chaos—as methods for human subjects to overcome the lived experience of market logic. Additionally both books cite the work of Deleuze and Guattari, Marx's Fragment on Machines from the Grundrisse, the Tractatus Logico-Philosophicus by Wittgenstein, and Symbolic Exchange and Death by Baudrillard.

=== The Uprising ===
In The Uprising Berardi rejects economic discourse, asserting that economics itself is not a science but rather a form of political ideology. (Note: "It is difficult to believe that something like 'economic science' really exists. What is a science? Without embarking on epistomological discussions, I would simply say that science is a form of knowledge which is free of dogma, which is able to extrapolate general laws from the observation of empirical phenomena (and consequently able to predict something about what will happen next), and finally which is able to understand those kinds of changes that Thomas Kuhn has labeled paradigm shifts. As far as I know, the discourse named 'economics' does not correspond to this schema.") Consequently he further rejects the notion that neoliberal economic policy is based in the objectivity of science, but is instead merely a political program and an undesirable one. Against the mathematical language of economics (which he alleges masquerades as scientific) Berardi proposes a speculative (and also unscientific) rhetoric of poetry, which he intends to disrupt the conventional wisdom of contemporary economics.

Berardi decries the automation and standardization of language via computer technology, which he alleges results in an impoverished language as experienced by the human subject, with the result that it is more difficult to conceptualize another form of life apart from the current economic/political situation. (Note: "The techno-linguistic machine is giving language to human beings, and also taking the place of human beings in language for the current generation. The first generation that learned more words from a machine than from their mothers has a problem concerning the relationship between words and the body, between words and affection. The separation of language learning from the body of the mother and from the body in general is changing language itself, and is changing the relationship between language and the body.") He also criticizes the fragmentation of precarious work (e.g. seasonal work, telecommuting) which leads to social atomization and precludes social solidarity, and further rejects neoliberal and conservative economic views. As remedies, Berardi proposes both a rediscovery of poetic language which speaks directly to humans, and also a redirection of the general intellect—a Marxist term deriving from the Grundrisse, referring to the cognitive capacity of society—away from capitalism and towards social solidarity.

=== Breathing ===
In Breathing, Berardi uses respiration as a metaphor to discuss modern society. Beginning with his own asthma and the death of Eric Garner, he advances the notion that humanity is experiencing a "breathlessness" in all areas of life as a result of being out of sync with contemporary capitalism and technology. The book continues several of the themes previously treated in The Uprising.

Berardi cites Chaosmosis, a text by Félix Guattari, to establish a dichotomy of rhythm and chaos. This dichotomy is then compared with (regular and irregular) breathing and the alleged tension between humans and capitalist society.

The established order—social, political, economic, and sexual—aims to enforce a concatenation that stiffens and stifles the vibrational oscillation of singularities. This stiffening of vibrant bodies results in what Guattari calls 'spasms'. Guattari did not have time to further elaborate his concept of the chaosmic spasm, as he died a few months after the publication of Chaosmosis, but I think that this concept is crucial for an understanding of subjectivity under today's conditions of info-neural acceleration. The spasm provokes suffering and breathlessness in the nervous system and the consciousness of the social organism. But the spasm is 'chaosmic', in Guattari's terms, inasmuch as it invites the organism to remodulate its vibration and to create, ex nihilo, a harmonic order by way of resingularization."

— Breathing, pp. 23–24.

The rhetorical suggestion is that humanity is obliged to "shake off" capitalism in a spasm which will allow the social body to "breathe regularly" again, in a new rhythm.

Later, Berardi examines other alleged social ills of the early 21st century. He cites the novels of Jonathan Franzen as providing "insight into what is happening to the American mind, and particularly to the American unconscious, during the reign of Trump... the living brain of America is decaying, seized by anxiety and depression, furiously looking for scapegoats and for revenge." Berardi criticizes the virtual reality of dating apps (juxtaposed with reports of decreased sexual activity among millennials) and internet forum posts by the American hacker and troll weev as further examples of sickness in society. As proposed remedies, Berardi returns to poetry and the notion of seeking different rhythms of life.

== Bibliography (selected) ==
=== Books ===
- Thinking Gaza: An Essay on Ferocity. MIT Press. 24 March 2026. ISBN 978-1-63590-277-8.
- Quit Everything: Interpreting Depression. London: Repeater Books, 2024. ISBN 9781915672513
- The Third Unconscious: The Psychosphere in the Viral Age. London & New York: Verso Books, 2021. ISBN 9781839762536
- The Second Coming. Cambridge: Polity Press, 2019. ISBN 1509534849
- Breathing: Chaos and Poetry. Cambridge, Mass.: Semiotext(e) / Intervention Series, 2018. ISBN 1635900387
- Futurability: The Age of Impotence and the Horizon of Possibility. London & New York: Verso Books, 2017. ISBN 1784787442
- And: Phenomenology of the end. Cambridge, Mass.: Semiotext(e), 2015. ISBN 1584351705
- Heroes: Mass Murder and Suicide. London & New York: Verso Books, 2015. ISBN 1781685789
- The Uprising: On Poetry and Finance. Cambridge, Mass.: Semiotext(e) / Intervention Series, 2012. ISBN 1584351128
- After the Future. Edited by Gary Genosko and Nicholas Thoburn. Oakland & Edinburgh: AK Press, 2011. ISBN 1849350590
- The Soul at Work: From Alienation to Autonomy. Translated by Francesca Cadel and Giuseppina Mecchia, with preface by Jason E. Smith. Los Angeles, CA: Semiotexte, 2009. ISBN 1584350768
- With Marco Jacquement and Gianfranco Vitali. Ethereal Shadows: Communications and Power in Contemporary Italy. London: Autonomedia, 2009.
- Precarious Rhapsody. Semio-capitalism and the Pathologies of the Post-Alpha Generation. London: Autonomedia, 2009.
- Skizomedia. Trent'anni di mediattivismo. Untranslated: Schizomedia: Thirty Years of Media Activism. Rome: Derive Approdi, 2006.
- Il sapiente, il mercante, il guerriero: dal rifiuto del lavoro all'emergere del cognitariato Untranslated: The Warrior, The Merchant, and the Sage: the Emergence of the Cognitariat Refusal of Work. Rome: DeriveApprodi, 2004.
- With Jacquement e Vitali and Baldini Castoldi Dalai. Telestreet. Macchina immaginativa non omologata. Untranslated: Telestreet: Machine Imagination Not Approved. 2003.
- Alice è il diavolo. Storia di una radio sovversiva. Untranslated: Alice is the Devil: Story of a Subversive Radio. Shake, 2002.
- Un'estate all'inferno. Untranslated: Summer in Hell. Ed. Luca Sossella. 2002.
- Félix. Narrazione del mio incontro con il pensiero di Guattari, cartografia visionaria del tempo che viene. Translated: Félix Guattari. Thought, Friendship, and Visionary Cartography. London: Palgrave, 2008.
- La fabbrica dell'infelicita'. New economy e movimento del cognitariato. Untranslated: The Factory of Unhappiness: New Economy and Movement of the Cognitariat. Rome: DeriveApprodi, 2001.
- La nefasta utopia di Potere Operaio. Untranslated: The Ominous Utopia of Workers' Power. Castelvecchi, 1997.
- Exit, il nostro contributo all'estinzione della civilta. Untranslated: Exit – Our Contribution to the Extinction of Civilization.
- Cibernauti. Untranslated: Cybernauts. Castelvecchi, 1995.
- Come si cura il nazi, Neuromagma. Untranslated: How is the Nazi, Neuromagma. 1994.
- Mutazione e cyberpunk. Untranslated: Mutation and Cyberpunk. 1993.
- Piu' cyber che punk. Untranslated: More Cyber Than Punk. 1990.
- Infovirus. Untranslated. Topia. 1985.
- Enfin le ciel est tombè sur la terre. Untranslated: Finally the Sky Fell to the Earth. Seuil, 1978.
- Contro il lavoro. Untranslated: Against Work. Milano: Feltrinelli, 1970.

=== Essays and speeches ===
- "Futurism and the reversal of the future". London: May 2009.
- "Communism is back but we should call it the therapy of singularisation". London: February 2009.
- "The Post-Futurist Manifesto". Trans. R. W. Flint. 2009.
- "Biopolitics and Connective Mutation". Culture Machine, Vol. 7, 2005.
- "What is the Meaning of Autonomy Today: Subjectivation, Social Composition, Refusal of Work". Replicart. September 2003.
- "The Obsession with Identity Fascism". Trans. Steve Wright. From The Ominous Utopia of Worker Control (Untranslated text, 1997).
- "Info Labour and Precarity". Trans. Eric Empson.

== Filmography ==
- The Move (documentary). Directed by Renato de Maria. 1991.
