= Fordism =

Ford's assembly-line mass production and consumption manufacturing system

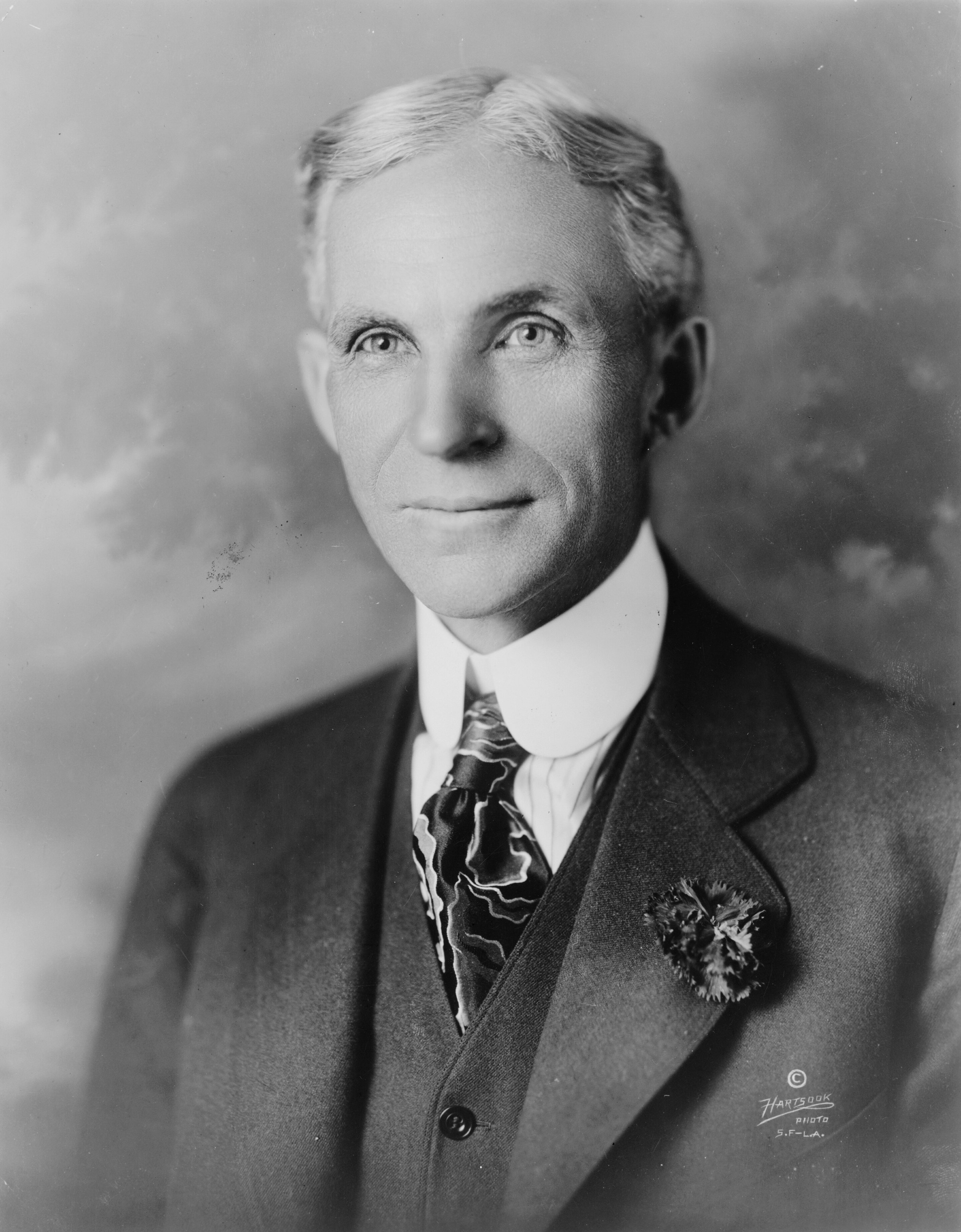
Henry Ford, after whom Fordism is named

Fordism is an industrial engineering and manufacturing system that serves as the basis of modern social and labor-economic systems that support industrialized, standardized mass production and mass consumption. The concept is named after Henry Ford. It is used in social, economic, and management theory about production, working conditions, consumption, and related phenomena, especially regarding the 20th century. It describes an ideology of advanced capitalism centered around the American socioeconomic systems in place in the post-war economic boom.

== Overview ==
Fordism is a "manufacturing system designed to produce standardized, low-cost goods and afford its workers decent enough wages to buy them." It has also been described as "a model of economic expansion and technological progress based on mass production: the manufacture of standardized products in huge volumes using special purpose machinery and unskilled labor." Although Fordism was a method used to improve productivity in the automotive industry, the principle could be applied to any kind of manufacturing process. Major success stemmed from three major principles:

1. The standardization of the product (nothing is handmade, but everything is made through machines and molds by unskilled workers)
2. The employment of assembly lines, which use special-purpose tools and/or equipment to allow common-skilled workers to contribute to the finished product
3. Workers are paid higher "living" wages so that they can afford to purchase the products they make

The principles, coupled with a technological revolution during Henry Ford's time, allowed for this form of labor to gain attraction. His assembly line was revolutionary though not original as it had previously been used at slaughterhouses. His most original contribution was breaking down complex tasks into simpler ones, with the help of specialised tools. Simpler tasks created interchangeable parts that could be used the same way every time. That allowed for flexibility, creating an assembly line that could change its constituent components to meet the needs of the product being assembled. In reality, the assembly line had existed before Ford, although not with the same effectiveness. His real accomplishment was recognizing the potential by breaking it all down into its components, to build it back up again in a more effective and productive combination, thereby producing a method for the real world.

The major advantages of such a change was that it cut down on the manpower necessary for the factory to operate, and it deskilled the labour itself, cutting down on costs of production.

There are four levels of Fordism, as described by Bob Jessop.

1. Capitalist labour process: Through implementing highly organized, Taylorist methods of production, designed to produce higher output, output can be increased and workers fully utilized.
2. Accumulation regime: Under the adherence to a belief in a 'virtuous circle of growth,' by increasing productivity, wages rise resulting in higher productivity, demand, investment, and operational efficacy.
3. Social mode of economic regulation: Clarity is gained by analyzing the in/outflow of capital, both in micro- [wages, internal movement] and macro- [monetary body, commerciality, external relations].
4. Generic mode of 'societalization': Deciphering State's and company's roles in the day-to-day economic lifestyles and patterns of the workforce, their economic habits, and the regional impact.

== Background ==
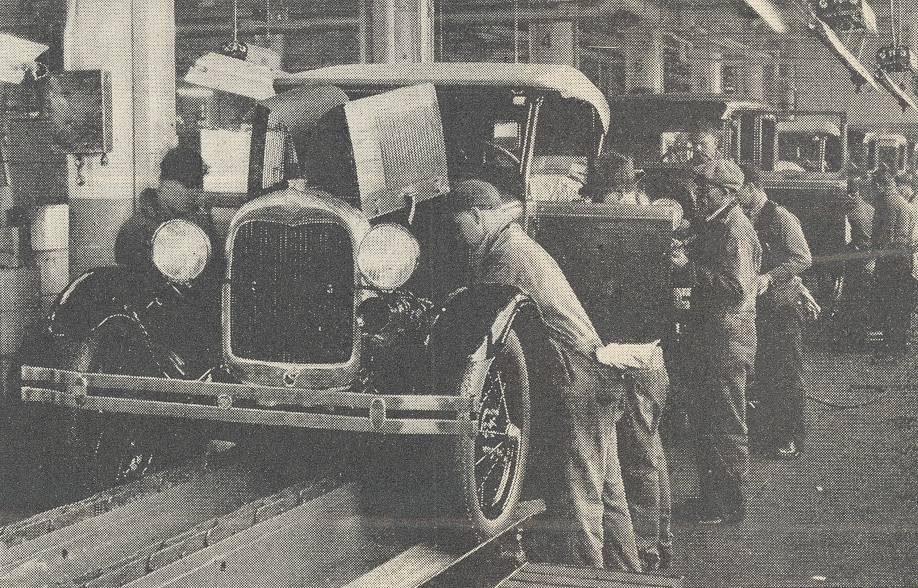
Ford cars (Model A shown) became a symbol of effective mass production. Efficiency both decreased the price of the cars and allowed Ford to increase his workers' wages. Hence, common workers could buy their own cars.

The Ford Motor Company was one of several hundred small automobile manufacturers that emerged between 1890 and 1910. After five years of producing automobiles, Ford introduced the Model T, which was simple and light but sturdy enough to drive on the country's primitive roads. The mass production of this automobile lowered its unit price, making it affordable for the average consumer. Furthermore, Ford substantially increased his workers' wages to combat rampant absenteeism and employee turnover, which approached 400% annually, which had the byproduct of giving them the means to become customers. That led to massive consumption. In fact, the Model T surpassed all expectations because it attained a peak of 60% of the automobile output within the United States.

The production system that Ford exemplified involved synchronization, precision, and specialization within a company.

Ford and his senior managers did not use the word "Fordism" themselves to describe their motivations or worldview, which they did not consider an "ism". However, many contemporaries framed their worldview as one and applied the name Fordism to it.

== History ==
The term gained prominence when it was used by Antonio Gramsci in 1934 in his essay "Americanism and Fordism" in his Prison Notebooks. Since then, it has been used by a number of writers on economics and society, mainly but not exclusively in the Marxist tradition.

According to historian Charles S. Maier, Fordism proper was preceded in Europe by Taylorism, a technique of labor discipline and workplace organization, based upon supposedly scientific studies of human efficiency and incentive systems. It attracted European intellectuals, especially in Germany and Italy, from the fin de siècle to World War I.

After 1918, however, the goal of Taylorist labor efficiency thought in Europe moved to "Fordism", the reorganization of the entire productive process by the moving assembly line, standardization, and the mass market. The grand appeal of Fordism in Europe was that it promised to sweep away all the archaic residues of precapitalist society, by subordinating the economy, society, and even the human personality to the strict criteria of technical rationality. The Great Depression blurred the utopian vision of American technocracy, but World War II and its aftermath revived the ideal.

Later, under the inspiration of Gramsci, Marxists picked up the Fordism concept in the 1930s and developed Post-Fordism in the 1970s. Robert J. Antonio and Alessandro Bonanno (2000) trace the development of Fordism and subsequent economic stages, from globalization to neoliberal globalization, during the 20th century, and emphasized the United States role in globalization. "Fordism," for Gramsci, meant routine, intensified labor to promote production. Antonio and Bonanno argue that Fordism peaked in the post-World War II decades of American dominance and mass consumerism but collapsed from political and cultural attacks on the people in the 1970s.

Advances in technology and the end of the Cold War ushered in a new "neoliberal" phase of globalization in the 1990s. Antonio and Bonanno further suggest that negative elements of Fordism, such as economic inequality, remained, allowing related cultural and environmental troubles, which inhibited America's pursuit of democracy to surface.

Historian Thomas Hughes has detailed how the Soviet Union, in the 1920s and the 1930s, enthusiastically embraced Fordism and Taylorism by importing American experts in both fields as well as American engineering firms to build parts of its new industrial infrastructure. The concepts of the Five-Year Plan and the centrally-planned economy can be traced directly to the influence of Taylorism on Soviet thinking. Hughes quotes Joseph Stalin's Foundations of Leninism:

"American efficiency is that indomitable force which neither knows nor recognizes obstacles; which continues on a task once started until it is finished, even if it is a minor task; and without which serious constructive work is inconceivable...The combination of the Russian revolutionary sweep with American efficiency is the essence of Leninism."

Hughes describes how, as the Soviet Union developed and grew in power, both the Soviets and the Americans chose to ignore or deny the contribution of American ideas and expertise. The Soviets did so because they wished to portray themselves as creators of their own destiny and not indebted to their rivals, while the Americans did so because they did not wish to acknowledge, during the Cold War, their part in creating a powerful rival.

== Post-Fordism ==
Information technology, white-collar work, and specialization are some of the attributes of post-Fordism.

The period after Fordism has been termed Post-Fordist and Neo-Fordist. The former implies that global capitalism has made a clean break from Fordism, including overcoming its inconsistencies, but the latter implies that elements of the Fordist ROA continued to exist. The Regulation School preferred the term After-Fordism (or the French Après-Fordisme) to denote that what comes after Fordism was or is not clear.

In Post-Fordist economies:

- New information technologies are important.
- Products are marketed to niche markets rather than in mass consumption patterns based on social class.
- Service industries predominate over manufacturing.
- The workforce is feminized.
- Financial markets are globalized.
- White collar creativity is needed.
- Workers do not stay in one job for their whole lives.
- 'Just-in-time' systems in which products are manufactured after orders are placed.

== Cultural references ==
The mass-produced robots in Karel Čapek's play R.U.R. have been described as representing "the traumatic transformation of modern society by the First World War and the Fordist assembly line."

A religion based on the worship of Henry Ford is a central feature of the technocracy in Aldous Huxley's Brave New World, where the principles of mass production are applied to human reproduction as well as to industry.

== See also ==
- Cognitive-cultural economy
- Division of labour
- High modernism
- Manifest Destiny
- Modern Times (film)
- New Frontier
- Post-Fordism
- Progress
- Scientism
- Techno-progressivism
- Technocentrism
- Technological utopianism

== Bibliography ==
- Antonio, Robert J. and Bonanno, Alessandro. "A New Global Capitalism? From 'Americanism and Fordism' to 'Americanization-globalization.'" American Studies 2000 41 (2–3): 33–77. ISSN 0026-3079.
- Banta, Martha. Taylored Lives: Narrative Production in the Age of Taylor, Veblen, and Ford. U. of Chicago Press, 1993. 431 pp.
- Baca, George. "Legends of Fordism." Social Analysis Fall 2004: 171–180.
- De Grazia, Victoria (2005), Irresistible Empire: America's Advance Through 20th-Century Europe, Cambridge: Belknap Press of Harvard University Press, ISBN 0-674-01672-6
- Doray, Bernard (1988). From Taylorism to Fordism: A Rational Madness.
- Holden, Len. "Fording the Atlantic: Ford and Fordism in Europe" in Business History Volume 47, #1 January 2005 pp. 122–127.
- Hounshell, David A. (1984), From the American System to Mass Production, 1800–1932: The Development of Manufacturing Technology in the United States, Baltimore, Maryland: Johns Hopkins University Press, ISBN 978-0-8018-2975-8, LCCN 83016269, OCLC 1104810110
- Hughes, Thomas P. (2004). American Genesis: A Century of Invention and Technological Enthusiasm 1870–1970. 2nd ed. The University of Chicago Press.
- Jenson, Jane. "'Different' but Not 'Exceptional': Canada's Permeable Fordism," Canadian Review of Sociology and Anthropology, Vol. 26, 1989.
- Jürgens, Ulrich. "Automation and Its Impact on Productivity and Workers: Lessons from the History of the Car Industry." Weizenbaum Journal of the Digital Society 5.2 (2025). online
- Koch, Max. (2006). Roads to Post-Fordism: Labour Markets and Social Structures in Europe.
- Ling, Peter J. America and the Automobile: Technology, Reform, and Social Change chapter on "Fordism and the Architecture of Production"
- Link, Stefan J. Forging Global Fordism: Nazi Germany, Soviet Russia, and the Contest over the Industrial Order (2020) excerpt
- Maier, Charles S. "Between Taylorism and Technocracy: European Ideologies and the Vision of Industrial Productivity." Journal of Contemporary History (1970) 5(2): 27–61. ISSN 0022-0094 Fulltext online at Jstor
- Nolan, Maty. Visions of Modernity: American Business and the Modernization of Germany Oxford University Press, 1994 online
- Mead, Walter Russell. "The Decline of Fordism and the Challenge to American Power." New Perspectives Quarterly; Summer 2004: 53–61.
- Meyer, Stephen. (1981) "The Five Dollar Day: Labor Management and Social Control in the Ford Motor Company, 1908–1921" State University of New York Press.
- Pietrykowski, Bruce (1995). "Fordism at Ford: Spatial Decentralization and Labor Segmentation at the Ford Motor Company, 1920–1950". Economic Geography. 71: 383–401. Archived from the original on 17 November 2011 – via Questia.
- Roediger, David, ed. "Americanism and Fordism - American Style: Kate Richards O'hare's 'Has Henry Ford Made Good?'" Labor History 1988 29(2): 241–252. Socialist praise for Ford in 1916.
- Settis, Bruno. (2016) Fordismi. Storia politica della produzione di massa, Il Mulino, Bologna.
- Shiomi, Haruhito and Wada, Kazuo. Fordism Transformed: The Development of Production Methods in the Automobile Industry (Oxford University Press, 1995).
- Tolliday, Steven and Zeitlin, Jonathan eds. The Automobile Industry and Its Workers: Between Fordism and Flexibility in Comparative analysis of developments in Europe, Asia, and the United States from the late 19th century to the mid-1980s. (1987)
- Watson, Daniel. "Fordism: A review essay." Labor History 60.2 (2018): 144–159. online
- Watts, Steven. The People's Tycoon: Henry Ford and the American Century. (2005).
- Williams, Karel, Colin Haslam and John Williams. "Ford versus 'Fordism': The Beginning of Mass Production?" Work, Employment & Society, Vol. 6, No. 4, 517–555 (1992). Focus on Ford's flexibility and commitment to continuous improvements.
- Wilson, J. M. "Henry Ford vs. assembly line balancing." International Journal of Production Research (2014). 52(3), 757–765. https://doi.org/10.1080/00207543.2013.836616
- Wilson, James M., and Alan McKinlay. "Rethinking the assembly line: Organisation, performance and productivity in Ford Motor Company, c. 1908–27." Business History 52.5 (2010): 760–778. online
