= Paolo Virno =

Italian philosopher (1952–2025)

- Born: 14 May 1952; Naples, Italy
- Died: 7 November 2025 (aged 73); Rome, Italy

Education
- Education: Sapienza University of Rome

Philosophical work
- Era: Contemporary philosophy
- Region: Western philosophy
- School: Continental philosophy; Autonomist Marxism
- Institutions: University of Urbino; Roma Tre University
- Main interests: Political philosophy, semiotics, post-Fordism, theory of subjectivity, materialism, communication ethics
- Notable ideas: The flourishing of the general intellect in post-Fordist capitalism

Paolo Virno (/ˈvɜːrnoʊ/; Italian: [ˈvirno]; 14 May 1952 – 7 November 2025) was an Italian philosopher, semiologist and a figurehead for the Italian Marxist movement.

Implicated in belonging to illegal social movements during the 1960s and 1970s, Virno was arrested and jailed in 1979, accused of belonging to the Red Brigades. He spent several years in prison before finally being acquitted, after which he organised the publication Luogo Comune (Italian for "commonplace") in order to vocalise the political ideas, he developed during his imprisonment. At the time of his death, Virno was teaching philosophy at the Roma Tre University.

== Biography ==
Virno was born in Naples, but spent his childhood and adolescence in Genoa. He had his first political experiences when joining the social movements of 1968—the association between personal fulfillment and anti-capitalism, typical of the critique artiste ("artistic critique") of the 1960s, which then constituted one of the key reasons for his political philosophy. He moved to Rome with his family at the beginning of the 1970s, where he studied philosophy in university.

Simultaneously, Virno was involved in the labour movement and campaigned in the organisation Potere Operaio, a Marxist group involved in the recruitment and mobilisation of industrial workers. Potere Operaio, unlike political communists of the Soviet Union and China who sought to combine the student bodies with the workers' unions, focused mainly on factory and industrial workers in a programme stemming from Marx's theory criticising the organisation of work. Virno participated in the movement, organising protests and strikes in northern Italian factories, until its dissolution in 1973.

In 1977, Virno presented his doctoral thesis on the concept of work and the theory of consciousness of Theodor Adorno, while actively participating in the movement of 1977, which organised around the precariousness of workers. The Metropolitan magazine, which he founded along with Oreste Scalzone and Franco Piperno, was revered as the body of the intellectual movement at the time. Two years later, the editorial board of Metropolitan France was jailed on charges of belonging to the Red Brigades.

The three-year period of custody was a time of intense intellectual activity for Virno and others involved. After being sentenced in 1982 to 12 years in prison for "subversive activities and creation of an armed group" (though the charges of belonging to the Red Brigades did not materialise), Virno appealed and was released pending trial in the second instance; in 1987 he would eventually be acquitted, along with Piperno. His experience during these years were fed into the organisation of the Luogo Comune publication, devoted to the analysis of life forms within post-Fordism.

In 1993, Virno left his post as editor of Luogo Comune to teach philosophy at the University of Urbino. In 1996, he was invited to talk at the University of Montreal and upon his return he held the chair of philosophy of language, semiotics and ethics of communication at the University of Cosenza (Calabria). He later taught at the University of Rome.

Virno died on 7 November 2025, at the age of 73.

== Philosophical work ==
The early works of Virno were directly linked to his political participation, but after years of imprisonment, which along with his fellow prisoners, he conducted intensive studies of philosophy, and his focus on theoretical research has become more ambitious, covering political philosophy, linguistics and the study of mass media.

On the one hand, studies pertaining to philosophy of language have led to the confrontation of the classic themes of philosophy — like the analysis of subjectivity — with the limits imposed under linguistics. On the other hand, Virno has explored the ethical dimension of communication. The juncture of these fields was found to be a materialism that encompasses the processes of language and thought as a working link, keeping in line with the traditions of Theodor Adorno and Alfred Sohn-Rethel, the interrelationship between work, thought, language, society and history is the nexus of its philosophical thought.

The philosophical concepts, however, maintained a close link with theory and action-related policies; notions of "world", "power", "potential" or "history", which have been the focus of many of his works, were in fact conceived in key by Marx. Virno, along with many of his contemporaries such as Antonio Negri, has abandoned and argued against the hegemony of the dialectic tradition in Marxist philosophy.

Virno maintains the status of historical and linguistic concepts as being political-state, sovereignty, obedience, legality, legitimacy, which are accepted in social theory and philosophy as invariant, although polemically are considered to have been invented in the 17th century, with very specific and controversial political objectives. The reinvention of the concepts of society is part of the political task that has been proposed, regarding the concept of exodus — perhaps the best example of this joint, where the personal experiences of emotion are understood as an act of resistance toward established power and status quo. The assumption by the personality of the flight as a reaction to the social structure. On these lines, Virno has criticised these restrictions as symbolic of the counter-culture movements.

== Bibliography ==
Italian

- Convenzione e Materialismo (1986); Roma: Ed. Theoria
- Opportunisme, Cynisme et Peur. Ambivalence du Désenchantement Suivi de les Labyrinthes de la Langue (1991); Paris-Combas: Editions de l'éclat
- Mondanità. L'idea di "Mondo" tra Esperienza Sensibile e Sfera Pubblica (1994); Roma: Ed. Manifestolibri
- Parole con parole. Poteri e Limiti del Linguaggio (1995); Roma: Donzelli

Publications in English

- A Grammar of the Multitude. New York: Semiotext(e), 2004. ISBN 9781584350217
- Multitude: Between Innovation and Negation. New York: Semiotext(e), 2008. ISBN 1584350504
- When the Word Becomes Flesh. New York: Semiotext(e), 2015. ISBN 1584350946
- Déjà Vu and the End of History. New York: Verso Books, 2015. ISBN 1781686114
- Essay on Negation: For a Linguistic Anthropology. London/Calcutta: Seagull Books, 2018. ISBN 0857424386
- Convention and Materialism: Uniqueness without Aura. Translated by Lorenzo Chiesa. Cambridge, Mass.: MIT Press, 2021. ISBN 026204580X
- The Idea of World: Public Intellect and Use of Life. London/Calcutta: Seagull Books, 2022. ISBN 0857429892
