= Radio Alice =

Italian pirate radio station

Radio Alice was an Italian free radio broadcasting from Bologna at the end of the 1970s. It started transmitting on 9 February 1976 using an ex-military transmitter on a frequency of 100.6 MHz. The station founders were associated with the Italian counter-culture movement of 1977 and drew inspiration from the Situationists and Dada. Franco "Bifo" Berardi, one of the founders, described Radio Alice as a "mix between a classical medium of militant information and a sort of art experiment in media sabotage."

The station was closed by the carabinieri on 12 March 1977. Radio Alice then re-opened again for two years and became politically aligned with the autonomism movement. After closure, the frequency was then given by the state to Radio Radicale. Radio Alice's output covered a myriad of subjects: labor protests, poetry, yoga lessons, political analysis, love declarations, cooking recipes, Jefferson Airplane, Area or Beethoven music. Participants in the station included Franco "Bifo" Berardi, Maurizio Torrealta, Filippo Scòzzari, Paolo Ricci and Carlo Rovelli. In 2002 some former staff members participated in the founding of Orfeo TV, the first Telestreet unlicensed TV.

The work of Radio Alice inspired the founders of Novara Media.

== See also ==
- Autonomism
- Working Slowly (Radio Alice), a 2004 Italian film about Radio Alice by Guido Chiesa
- Wu Ming

== Sources ==
- Alice è il diavolo - Storia di una radio sovversiva, 1976, L'Erba Voglio (2002, Shake Edizioni)
