= Roman Rosdolsky =

Ukrainian Marxian scholar, historian, and political theorist (1898–1967)

- Роман Роздольський
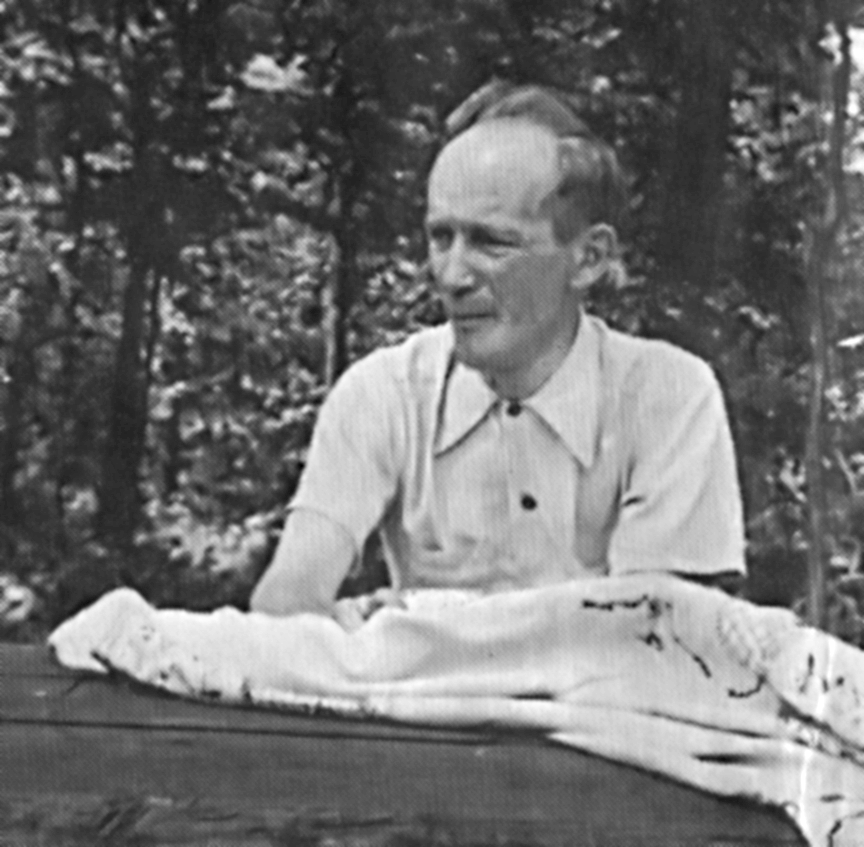
- Portrait of Rosdolsky, c. 1960
- Born: Roman Osipovich Rosdolsky; 19 July 1898; Lemberg, Kingdom of Galicia and Lodomeria, Austria-Hungary
- Died: 20 October 1967 (aged 69); Detroit, Michigan, United States
- Occupation: Translator
- Writing career
- Pen name: Roman Prokopovycz; P.Suk.; Tenet; W.S.
- Period: 20th century
- Political party: KPZU
- Father: Osyp Rosdolsky

Roman Osipovich Rosdolsky (Ukrainian: Роман Осипович Роздольський, romanized: Roman Osypovych Rozdolskyy; 19 July 1898 – 20 October 1967) was a prominent Ukrainian Marxian scholar, historian and political theorist. Rosdolsky's book of 1968 entitled Zur Entstehungsgeschichte des Marxschen 'Kapital': Der Rohentwurf des Kapital 1857–1858 (lit. 'On the history of the creation of Marx's 'Kapital': The rough draft of Capital 1857–1858'; transl. into English as The Making of Marx's Capital, 1977), became a foundational text in the rediscovery of Marx critique of political economy, as well as influenced later scholars such as Moishe Postone.

== Biography ==
Rosdolsky was born in Lemberg then in the Kingdom of Galicia and Lodomeria, Austro-Hungarian Empire. Rosdolsky's father Osyp Rosdolsky was a Ukrainian theologian, philologist, ethnographer, and translator of some repute. Roman's uncle was Ukrainian composer Danylo Rosdolsky. Both Roman's grandparents were priests of the Greek Catholic Church and well-known supporters of the independence of the Ukrainian nation. Ivan Franko was a family friend.

As a youth, Rosdolsky was a member of the Ukrainian socialist Drahomanov Circles. He was drafted in the Imperial army in 1915, and edited with Roman Turiansky the journal Klyči in 1917. He was a founder of the International Revolutionary Social Democracy (IRSD) and studied law in Prague. During World War I he founded the antimilitaristic Internationale Revolutionäre Sozialistische Jugend Galiziens (transl. International Revolutionary Socialist Youth of Galizia). He became a member of the Central Committee of the Communist Party of Eastern Galicia (KPZU), representing its émigré organization 1921-1924 and a leading publicist of the Vasylkivtsi faction of the Ukrainian communists. In 1925, he refused to condemn Trotsky and his Left Opposition, and was later, at the end of the 1920s, expelled from the KPZU.

In 1926-1931, he was a correspondent in Vienna of the Marx-Engels Institute in Moscow, searching for archival materials. At that time, in 1927, he met his wife Emily. When the labour movement in Austria suffered repression, he emigrated in 1934 back to Lwów, where he worked at the university as lecturer and he published the Trotskyist periodical Žittja i slovo 1934-1938. He was arrested by the Gestapo in 1942, but survived internment for three years in the concentration camps of Auschwitz, Ravensbrück and Oranienburg. While he was in prison, his son Hans Georg was born in January 1943.

The family emigrated to the U.S. in 1947. Rosdolsky worked there as an independent scholar, doing thorough research in the Detroit library. He published also under pseudonyms such as Roman Prokopovycz, P.Suk., Tenet, and W.S.

Rosdolsky is mainly known in the English-speaking world for his careful scholarly exegesis on Marx's Grundrisse, The Making of Marx's Capital. The collection of essays overturned many previous interpretations of Das Kapital. Yet he published much more, especially on historical topics. During his life, he corresponded with numerous well known Marxist writers including Isaac Deutscher, Ernest Mandel, Paul Mattick, and Karl Korsch. Mandel called Rosdolsky's work on the National Question the only Marxist criticism of Marx himself.

Rosdolsky died in 1967 in Detroit.

== Main published works in English ==
- 1951 "The Distribution of the Agrarian Product in Feudalism", in: Journal of Economic History (1951), pp. 247–265
- 1952 "On the nature of peasant serfdom in Central and Eastern Europe", in: Journal of Central European Affairs, Vol. 12, 1952.
- 1963 "A Revolutionary Parable on the Equality of Men", in: Archiv für Sozialgeschichte, Bd. 3 (1963), pp. 291–293.
- 1965 "Worker and Fatherland: a Note on a Passage in the Communist Manifesto". Science & Society, Vol. 29, 1965, pp. 330–337 (reprinted in Bob Jessop & Dennis Wheatley (ed.), Karl Marx's social and political thought. London: Routledge, 1999).
- 1974 "Method of Marx's Capital". New German Critique, Number 3, Fall 1974.
- 1977 The Making of Marx's Capital. London: Pluto Press, 1977.
- 1986 Engels and the `Nonhistoric' Peoples: the National Question in the Revolution of 1848. Glasgow: Critique books, 1987. First published in Critique, No.18/19, 1986.
- Himka, John-Paul (January 1988). "A memoir of Auschwitz and Birkenau - a memoir of Marxist Roman Rosdolsky translated from Ukranian journal Oborona 1956 by John Paul Himka". Monthly Review. 39 (8): 33–38. Archived from the original on May 7, 2006 – via FindArticles.
- 1999 Lenin and the First World War. London: Prinkipo Press, 1999.
- 2009 "The Jewish Orphanage in Cracow". In: The Online Publications Series of the Center for Urban History of East Central Europe, No. 4, Lviv, October 2009 (translated by Diana Rosdolsky)
