= The Soul at Work: From Alienation to Autonomy =

2009 book by Franco Beraldi

- Author: Franco Berardi
- Publication date: 2009
- ISBN: 978-1-58435-076-7

The Soul at Work: From Alienation to Autonomy is a book by the Italian philosopher Franco Berardi.

== Summary ==
In the book Berardi reflects on the new forms of alienation and addresses people's feelings of alienation in regards to work, as well as to how their refusal to submit to work used to be the foundation of a human community - that fought for autonomy against the work society.

Berardi cites a number of authors in the book. For example: Epicurus, Felix Guattari, Jean Baudrillard, Luciano Gallina, Gregory Bateson, Alain Ehrenberg, Giovanni Pico della Mirandola.

== See also ==
- Critique of work
- Pharmaceutical industry
- Socialisation
