= Telestreet =

Telestreet is an Italian movement that set up free TV stations in several metropolitan areas in Italy. The movement started in Bologna with a small transmitting station, OrfeoTv, which was founded by activist Franco "Bifo" Berardi. Since June 2002, this micro-TV station has been broadcasting for a few hours a day within a range of 200 metres.

There are now nearly one hundred mini TV stations across Italy. Their transmitting hardware contains slightly modified receiver electronics.

The telestreet are usually promoted by organizations, groups or individuals who use the facility for television and social uses for group benefit, with the aim of making television a free communication tool like a newspaper or a website.

== See also ==
- Radio Alice
