= Cognitive-cultural economy =

Cognitive-cultural economy or cognitive-cultural capitalism is represented by sectors such as high-technology industry, business and financial services, personal services, the media, and the cultural industries. It is characterized by digital technologies combined with high levels of cognitive and cultural labor.

== Overview ==
The concept of cognitive-cultural economy has been associated with 'post-Fordism', the 'knowledge economy', the 'new economy' and highly flexible labor markets.

As Fordist mass production began to wane after the mid to late 1970s in advanced capitalist countries, a more flexible system of productive activity began to take its place. The concept of cognitive-cultural capitalism has developed as a response to the insufficiency of the interpretations of this transition from a Fordist to a post-Fordist model of "flexible accumulation". Early empirical studies of this new system were published in the 1980s on the basis of case-study materials focused mainly on high-technology industrial districts in the United States (Silicon Valley, Orange County, Boston's Route 128, etc.—see Saxenian) and revived craft industries in the north-east and center of Italy (the so-called Third Italy). Over the following decades, considerable empirical and theoretical advances were made on the basis of studies of the new cultural economy (fashion, film, publishing, etc.).

Levy and Murnane in The New Division of Labor highlight the replacement of standardized machinery in the American production system by digital technologies that not only act as a substitute for routine labor, but that also complement and enhance the intellectual and affective assets of the labor force. These technologies underpinned an enormous expansion of the technology-intensive, service, financial, craft, and cultural industries that became the heart of the cognitive-cultural economy.

== See also ==
- Creative industries
- Financial services
- General intellect
- High-technology industry
- Operaismo
- Postfordism
- Regulation school
