= Alain Lipietz =

French engineer, economist and politician (born 1947)

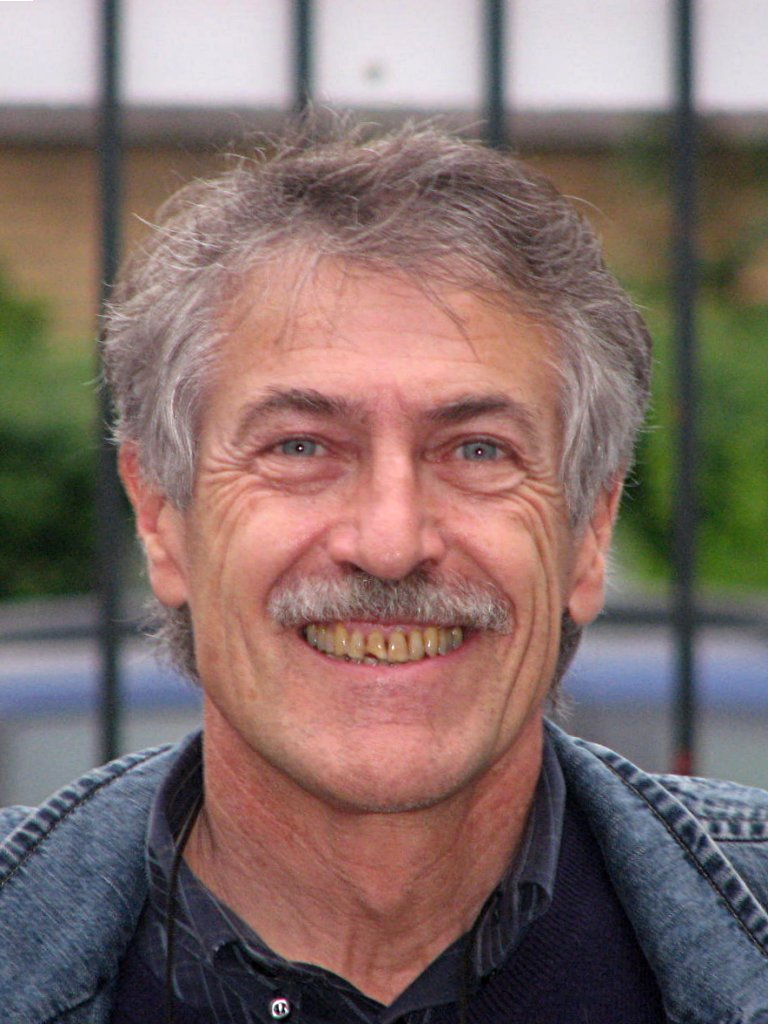

Member of the European Parliament
- In office 1999–2009

Personal details
- Born: Alain Guy Lipiec; 19 September 1947 (age 79) Charenton-le-Pont, France
- Party: Europe Ecology – The Greens
- Education: École Polytechnique; École des Ponts ParisTech

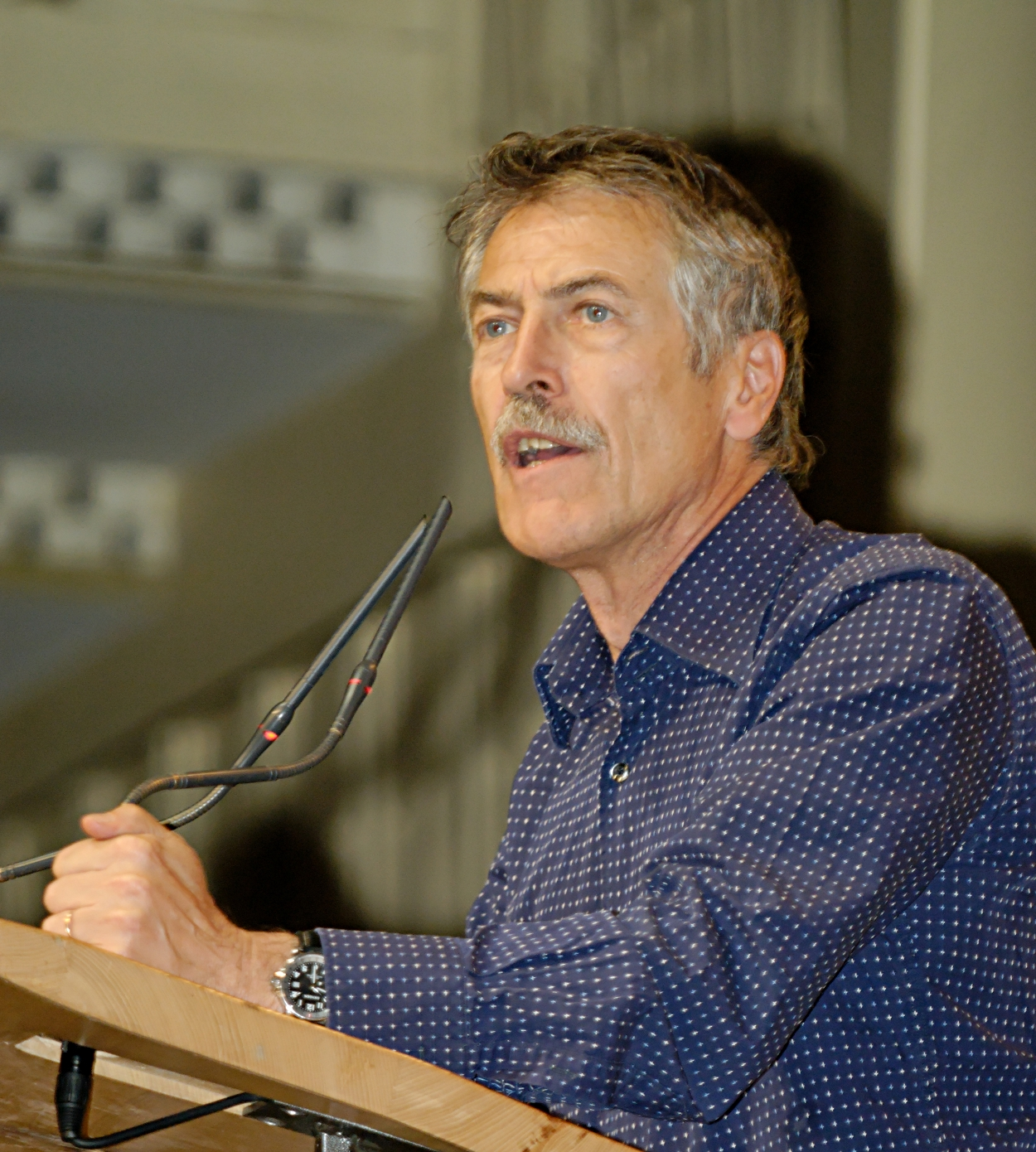
Alain Lipietz attending Dominique Voynet's meeting during the 2007 French presidential election

Alain Lipietz (born Alain Guy Lipiec, 19 September 1947) is a French engineer, economist and politician, a former Member of the European Parliament, and a member of the French Green Party. He has, however, been suspended from the party since 25 March 2014 and is an elected local politician in Val de Bièvre, Paris, France.

== Education and background ==
Alain Lipietz was raised in Paris in a middle class, Leftist family. His mother was French and his father was a Jewish Pole, who had fled antisemitism in Poland at the age of two and arrived in France in 1924. They had three children. Lipietz was a precocious child, winning a prize at the age of 15 for public speaking. He studied at the exclusive École polytechnique as an engineer (entered in 1966) and the École Nationale des Ponts et Chaussées (diploma in 1971). He had participated in the May '68 protests in Paris, and seen the plight of miners in the north of France, prompting him to study economics, obtaining a Masters from the Sorbonne in 1972.

From 1971 to 1973 he was a researcher in economics at the Institut de recherche des transports (The French transportation research institute) and then from 1973 to 1999 at the Centre d'études prospectives d'économie – Mathématiques appliquées à la planification (Center for prospective studies of economics – applied mathematics for planning). He became a research director at CNRS from 1988 to 2002. In 1990 he became chief engineer at the Corps of Bridges and Roads (France), and taught at various Paris universities over the course of his career.

Despite his interests in regional planning and economics, since the beginning of his career he also devoted himself to the analysis of social and environmental issues. In particular he contributed to the Regulation school of economic thought, as well as environmental theory and policy.

Lipietz first married at age 20. Francine Compte, a feminist and writer, died of cancer in 2008. He married Natalie Gandais in July 2015.

== Political activities ==
Alain Lipietz is a former Maoist. He was then a candidate of Les Verts for the legislative elections of 1986 in Seine-Saint-Denis, and became the national spokesperson of the French Green Party in 1997.

He was an elected representative of the Green Party at the European Parliament from 1999 to 2009, serving two terms.

Alain Lipietz was an adviser to the Commission économique des Verts, a member of the Commission française du développement durable (from 2000) and a member of the Conseil d'établissement du Collège de France (since 2001).

On 21 June 2001, Lipietz was elected as candidate for the French Green Party in the 2002 presidential elections. With 50% of the votes cast in the party's primaries, Lipietz narrowly beat rival candidate Noël Mamère.

However, controversy arose during the summer of 2001, when Lipietz seemed to have appeared sympathetic to separatists jailed for planting bombs in Corsica. A second controversy was his opposition to reopening the Mont Blanc Tunnel between France and Italy, which had been closed since the tunnel fire in 1999, which killed 39 people. Meanwhile, the party dropped from seven to five percent support in opinion polls. Finally, on 14 October 2001, Les Verts managed to survive a major internal crisis and changed their Presidential candidate, dropping Alain Lipietz to choose Noël Mamère, who had supposedly made the irrevocable decision not to run just a day sooner.

== Court challenge to SNCF ==
In 2006 Alain and his sister Hélène, A former Green Senator and lawyer, sued the French government and SNCF, the national railway of France, for reparations for transporting members of their family to the Drancy deportation camp during World War II. The case was heard in the French Administrative Court, the body charged with trying cases against the French government and its agencies. The defendants argued at trial that they were at the time under orders of the German military; the railroad further argued that the German military threatened to shoot any railroad official who disobeyed their orders. The court disagreed, concluding that the Vichy government could not have avoided knowledge of the prisoners' likely deportation to concentration camps, and that SNCF made no effort to either protest the transportation or to transport them in a humane manner. On June 6, 2006, the court ordered them to pay € 61,000 (almost $80,000).

The French government accepted the decision, but in 2007 SNCF successfully appealed the decision regarding themselves. The appeal court found that SNCF was a separate entity to the government and thus outside the competence of the Administrative court.

The Lipietz family are understood to be considering a further appeal to the State Council in respect of the claim against SNCF.

== French local politics ==
In 2014, Alain Lipietz ranked second in the EELV (Greens) candidate list for Villejuif (94) municipal election in the Paris southern suburbs, and as a candidate for President of the Agglomeration of Val de Bièvre (which comprises Arcueil, Cachan, Fresnes, Gentilly, Le Kremlin-Bicêtre, L'Haÿ-les-Roses and Villejuif). Coming fifth, he and colleagues then engineered a coalition with right wing candidates and socialist dissidents, to attain a majority coalition. The national Green Party suspended the local EELV Villejuif candidates for this alliance with the right wing, which is against party policy. Alain Lipietz has become a councillor in the majority coalition and one of the vice-presidents of the Agglomeration of Val de Bièvre. He remains suspended by the Greens.

== Main publications ==
Lipietz is a prolific academic author with most of his work spanning regional development and regulation theory, labour economics, and green politics.

He is the author of:

- Lipietz, A.Qu'est-ce que l'écologie politique ? La Grande Transformation du XXIè siècle (3rd ed. Paris: Les Petits Matins, 2012: 2nd ed. 2003: 1st ed. 1999)
- Lipietz, A.Green Deal. La crise du libéral-productivisme et la réponse écologiste. (Paris: La Découverte, 2012)
- Lipietz, A. La SNCF et la Shoah. Le procès G. Lipietz contre Etat et SNCF. (Paris: éd. Les Petits Matins, 2011)
- Lipietz, A. Face à la crise: l'urgence écologiste (Paris: Textuel, 2009)
- Lipietz, A. Les Fantômes de l'Internet. (Paris: Les Petits Matins, 2011)
- Lipietz, A. Refonder l'espérance : Leçons de la majorité plurielle (Paris: La Découverte, 2003)
- Lipietz, A. The theory of social regulation (in Japanese) (Tokyo: Aoki Shoten, 2002)
- Lipietz, A.Pour le tiers secteur: L'économie sociale et solidaire. (Paris: La Découverte, 2001)
- Benko, G. and Lipietz, A. (eds.) La richesse des nations: La nouvelle géographie socio-économique (Paris: PUF, 2000)
- Lipietz, A. El padre y la madre de la riqueza. Trabajo y ecologia (Lima: ADEC_ATC, 1995)
- Lipietz, A. Green Hopes. The Future of Political Ecology (London: Polity Press, 1995)(Vert-espérance. Le futur de l'écologie politique first published Paris: La Découverte, 1993)
- Lipietz, A. Un developpement ecologiquement soutenable: serait-il impossible?/Sera impossivel un desenvolvimento ecologicamente viavel? (Camara Municipal de Matosinhos, 1994)
- Lipietz, A. La société en sablier : Le partage du travail contre la déchirure sociale (Paris: La Découverte, 1993)
- Lipietz, A. Bagdad, Rio: le XXIè siècle est commencé (Paris: Quai Voltaire, 1992)
- Lipietz, A. Phèdre: identification d'un crime (Paris: Métailié, 1992)
- Benko, G. and Lipietz, A. (eds), (1992), Les régions qui gagnent: districts et réseaux, les nouveaux paradigmes de la géographie économique. (Paris: PUF, 1992)
- Lipietz, A. Choisir l'audace: Une alternative pour le XXI siècle (Paris: La Découverte, 1989)
- Lipietz, A. Towards a New Economic Order: Post-Fordism, Ecology, Democracy (Oxford University Press, 1989)
- Lipietz, A. Nach dem Ende des "Goldenen Zeitalters": Regulation und Transformation kapitalistischer Gesellschaften. (Berlin: Argument Verlag, 1988)
- Lipietz, A. Mirages and Miracles: Crisis in Global Fordism (London: Verso, 1987)
  (Mirages et miracles. Problèmes de l'industrialisation dans le Tiers-Monde, Paris: La Découverte 1985)
- Lipietz, A. The Enchanted World: Inflation, Credit and the Global Crises (London, Verso 1985) (Le monde enchanté: de la valeur à l'envol inflationniste. Paris: La Découverte, 1983)
- Lipietz, A. l'Audace Ou l'Enlisement: Sur les Politiques Economiques de la Gauche (Paris: La Découverte, 1984)
- Lipietz, A, D. Clerc and J. Satre-Buisson. La Crise (Paris: Syros, 1983).
- Lipietz, A. Crise et inflation, pourquoi? (Paris: François Maspero, 1979)
- Lipietz, A. Le capital et son espace (Paris: La Découverte, 1977)
- Lipietz, A. Le Tribut foncier urbain. (Paris: F. Maspero 1974)

He has also worked on many of the EC directives regarding the financial sector. (1990–2010)
