= General intellect =

Crucial force of production, according to Karl Marx

General intellect, according to Karl Marx in the Grundrisse, is capable of becoming a structural force of production. The concept designates a combination of technological expertise and social intellect, or general social knowledge (increasing importance of machinery in social organization). The "general intellect" passage in the Fragment on machines, says that, while the development of machinery led to the oppression of workers under capitalism, it also offers a prospect for future liberation.

== Overview ==
Nature builds no machines, no locomotives, railways, electric telegraphs, self-acting mules etc. These are products of human industry; natural material transformed into organs of the human will over nature, or of human participation in nature. They are organs of the human brain, created by the human hand; the power of knowledge, objectified. The development of fixed capital indicates to what degree general social knowledge has become a direct force of production, and to what degree, hence, the conditions of the process of social life itself have come under the control of the general intellect and been transformed in accordance with it; to what degree the powers of social production have been produced, not only in the form of knowledge, but also as immediate organs of social practice, of the real life process.

— Karl Marx, The Grundrisse, 1858.

According to Marx, the development of the general intellect manifests in a capitalist society, in the control of the social life process.

Thus, for Dyer-Witheford, the vision laid out in the Fragment “is eminently recognizable as a portrait of what is now commonly termed an ‘information society’ or ‘knowledge economy’” (1999, 221). […] In Virno’s view the Fragment argues that “abstract knowledge (primarily but not only scientific knowledge) is in the process of becoming nothing less than the main force of production and will soon relegate the repetitious and segmented assembly of the production-line to a residual position” (2007, 3).

In other words, with the idea of the general intellect, Marx designates a radical change of the subsumption of labour to capital and indicates a third stage of the division of labour. Paolo Virno maintained that "general intellect" is not exclusive to communism, and applies generally to late capitalism.

== Etymology ==
According to Matteo Pasquinelli, Marx took the expression 'general intellect' (Marx's term is gesellschaftliche Wissen) from William Thompson's book An Inquiry Into the Principles of the Distribution of Wealth (1824), an early text written on mental labour. According to Pasquinelli, the concept disappears in the transition between the Grundrisse and Capital as it is replaced by the notion of collective worker or Gesamtarbeiter.

== See also ==
- Cognitive-cultural economy
