= Regulation school =

Group of writers in political economy

The regulation school (French: l'école de la régulation) is a group of writers in political economy and economics whose origins can be traced to France in the early 1970s, where economic instability and stagflation were rampant in the French economy. The term régulation was coined by Frenchman Destanne de Bernis, who aimed to use the approach as a systems theory to bring Marxian economic analysis up to date. These writers are influenced by structural Marxism, the Annales School, institutionalism, Karl Polanyi's substantivist approach, and theory of Charles Bettelheim, among others, and sought to present the emergence of new economic (and hence social) forms in terms of tensions within existing arrangements. Since they are interested in how historically specific systems of capital accumulation are "regularized" or stabilized, their approach is called the "regulation approach" or "regulation theory". Although this approach originated in Michel Aglietta's monograph A Theory of Capitalist Regulation: The US Experience (Verso, 1976) and was popularized by other Parisians such as Robert Boyer, its membership goes well beyond the so-called Parisian School, extending to the Grenoble School, the German School, the Amsterdam School, British radical geographers, the US Social Structure of Accumulation School, and the neo-Gramscian school, among others.

== The regulation approach ==
Robert Boyer describes the broad theory as "The study of the transformation of social relations, which creates new forms- both economic and non-economic- organized in structures and reproducing a determinate structure, the mode of reproduction". This theory or approach looks at capitalist economies as a function of social and institutional systems and not just as government's role in the regulation of the economy, although the latter is a major part of the approach.

== Regimes of accumulation and modes of regulation ==
Regulation theory discusses historical change of the political economy through two central concepts, "regime of accumulation or accumulation regime" (AR) and "mode of regulation" (MR). The concept of regime of accumulation allows theorists to analyze the way production, circulation, consumption, and distribution organize and expand capital in a way that stabilizes the economy over time. Alain Lipietz, in Towards a New Economic Order, describes the regime of accumulation of Fordism as composed of mass-producing, a proportionate share-out of value added, and a consequent stability in firm’s profitability, with the plant used at full capacity and full employment (p. 6).

An MR is a set of institutional laws, norms, forms of state, policy paradigms, and other practices that provide the context for the AR's operation. Typically, it is said that it comprises a money form, a competition form, a wage form, a state form, and an international regime, but it can encompass many more elements than these. Generally speaking, MRs support ARs by providing a conducive and supportive environment, in which the ARs are given guidelines that they should follow. In cases of tension between the two, a crisis may occur. Thus this approach parallels Marx's characterisation of historical change as driven by contradictions between the forces and the relations of production (see historical materialism).

== Translation and definition ==
Bob Jessop summarises the difficulties of the term in Governing Capitalist Economies as follows: "The RA seeks to integrate analysis of political economy with analysis of civil society and or State to show how they interact to normalize the capital relation and govern the conflictual and crisis-mediated course of capital accumulation. In this sense, régulation might have been better and less mechanically translated as regularization or normalization" {Jessop, 2006, p.4}. Therefore, the term régulation does not necessarily translate well as "regulation". Regulation in the sense of government action does have a part in regulation theory.

== History of modes of regulation ==
Robert Boyer distinguished two main modes of regulation throughout the 19th and 20th centuries:

- The "mode of regulation of competition" (1850–1930). It consisted of a first mode of regulation, from 1850 to the beginning of the 20th century, that Boyer called "extensive mode of regulation", characterized by low productivity gains, important part of the output dedicated to equipments, and high competition. The second period is called "intensive mode of regulation without mass consumption", because it consists of high productivity gains (thanks to Taylorist methods) and the production of consumption commodities.
- The "monopolist mode of regulation" (after 1930), characterized by high productivity and mass consumption. The Fordist system made possible a regular growth of economic output and an increase in income at the same time.

== Crisis ==
Regulationist economists distinguish between cyclical and structural crises. They study only structural crises, which are the crises of a mode of regulation. From this distinction, they have formulated a typology of crises that accounts for various disarrangements in institutional configurations. According to its initial objective, which was to understand the rupture of the Fordist mode of regulation:

- Exogenic crises are due to an external event; they can be very perturbing but cannot endanger the mode of regulation, and even less the mode of accumulation. Neoclassical economists (or economists of the school of rational anticipations) consider that all crises are exogenic.
- Endogenous crises are cyclical crises that are necessary and inevitable, for they make it possible to cancel imbalances accumulated during the phase of expansion without major deterioration of institutional forms. These crises are inseparable from the operation of capitalism.
- The crisis of the mode of regulation: unable to avoid a downward spiral, institutional forms and the ways the state intervenes in the economy must be modified. The best example is the crisis of 1929, where the free play of market forces and competition did not lead to a renewed phase of expansion.
- The crisis of the mode of accumulation means that it is impossible to continue long-term growth without major upheaval of institutional forms. The crisis of 1929 is the best example: the interwar period marks the passage from a mode of accumulation characterised by mass production without mass consumption to a mode incorporating both mass production and mass consumption.

== Current developments ==
Since the 1980s, the regulation school has developed research at other socio-economic levels: firms, markets and branches studies (food and agriculture, automotive, banking); development and local regions ("regulation, sectors and territories" research workshop); developing countries or developed economies others than France and USA (South Korea, Chile, Belgium, Japan, Algeria): political economy of globalization (diversity of capitalisms, politics and firms). By doing so, its methods now range from institutional macroeconomics to discourses analysis, with quantitative and qualitative methods.

== Members of the school ==
- Michel Aglietta
- Alain Lipietz
- Robert Boyer
- Bob Jessop
- Jamie Peck
- André Orléan
- Christoph Scherrer
- Daniel Drache
- Matt Vidal

== See also ==
- Cybernetics
