= Feminisation of the workplace =

Trend towards inclusive modes of working

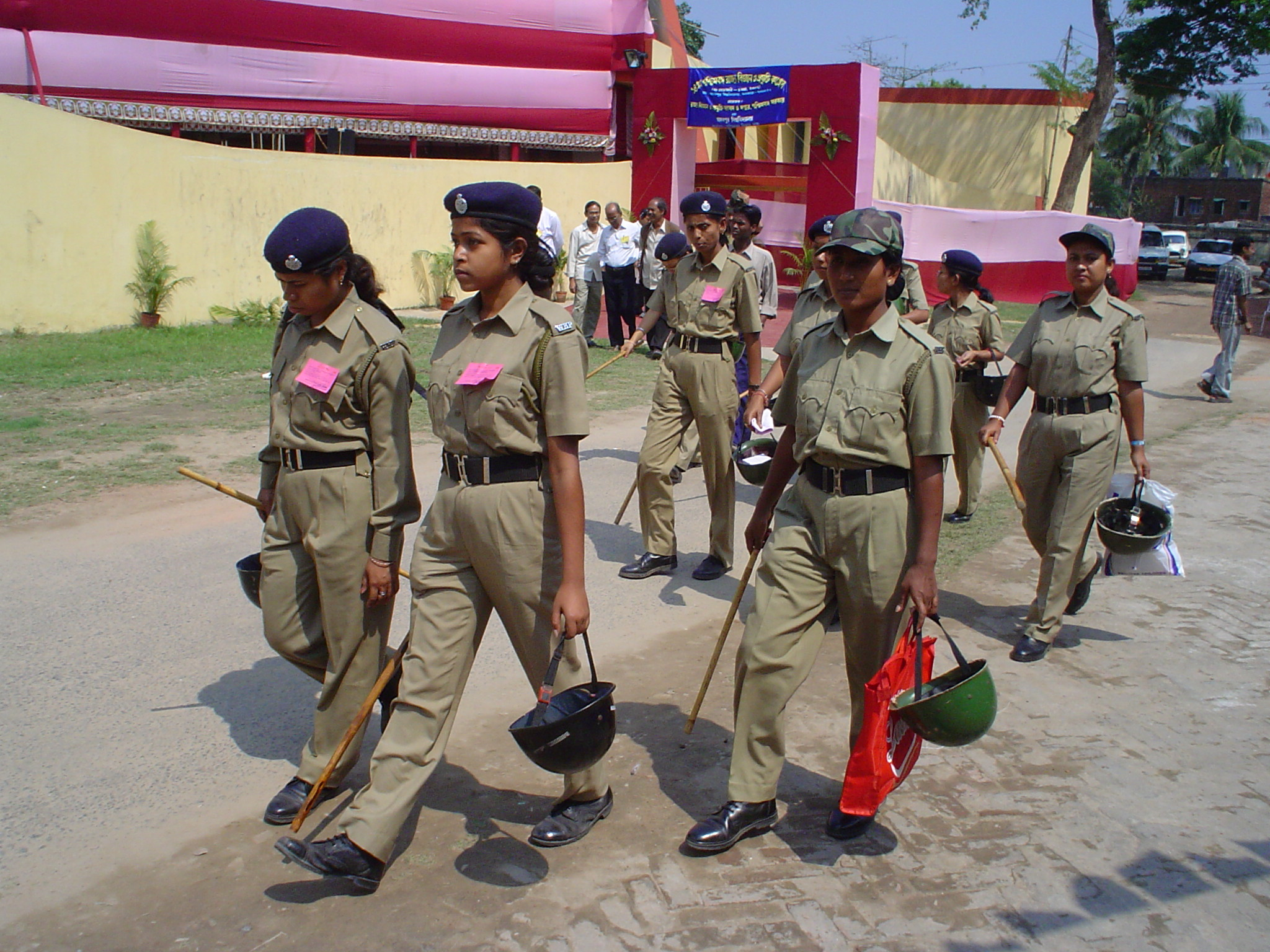
Women police on duty at Jadavpur, Kolkata, West Bengal, Science and Technology Fair, 2007

The feminisation of the workplace is the feminisation, or the shift in gender roles and sex roles and the incorporation of women into a group or a profession once dominated by men, as it relates to the workplace. It is a set of social theories seeking to explain occupational gender-related discrepancies.

== Categories of feminisation ==
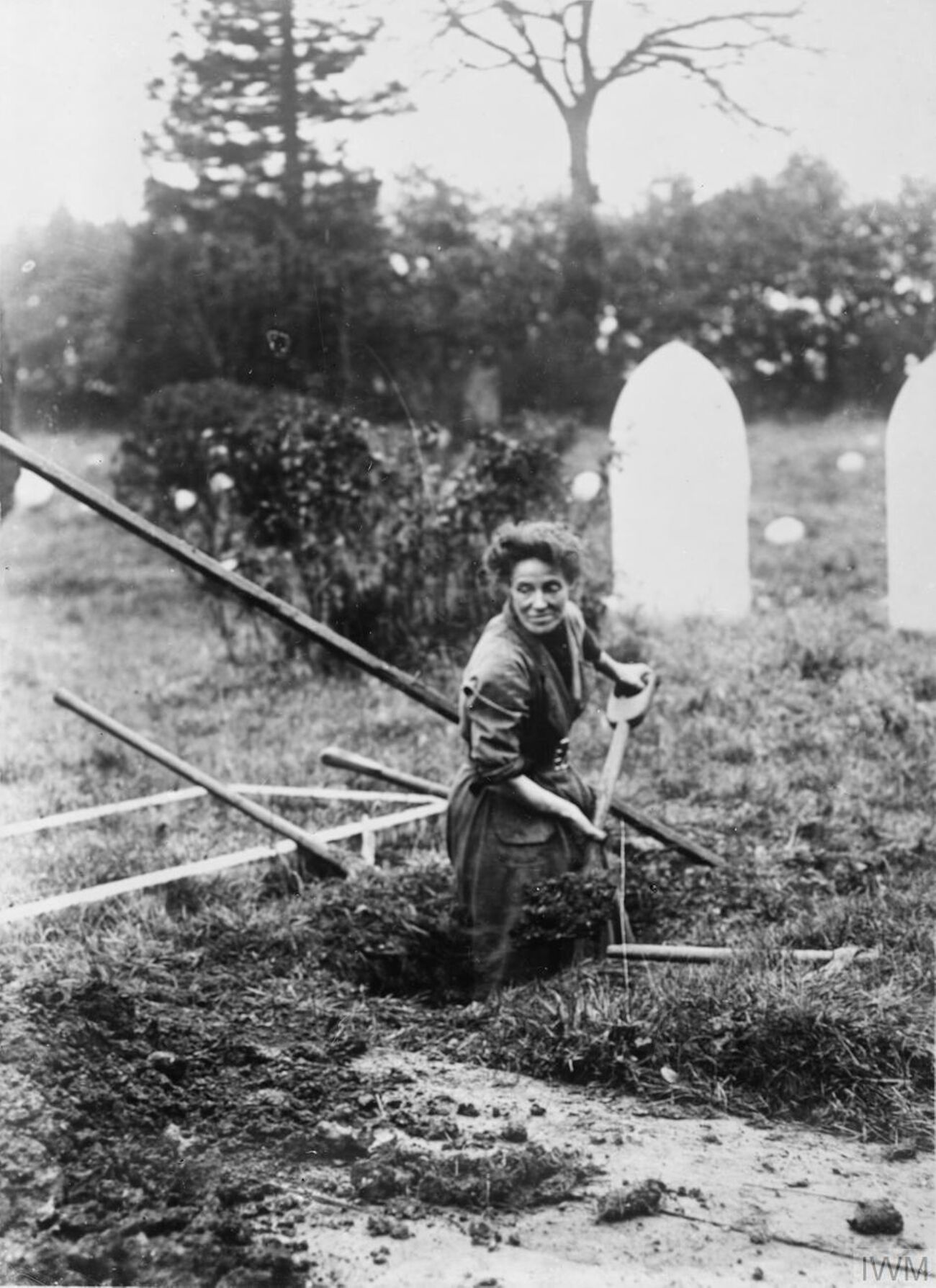
To support her large family, this woman took over her husband's job as a gravedigger while he was overseas during World War I. During wartime, labour shortages can open employment opportunities for women in jobs traditionally held by men.

=== Survival ===
Feminisation of survival is a term that feminists use to describe a social condition where women are forced into inhumane conditions for the survival of themselves and their families.

In 1888, the government of Canada decided to invite skilled Chinese men to work in a gold rush and the Canadian Pacific Railway to reduce the cost of labour wages and to make these projects affordable. The Chinese were motivated by desires to leave China and to earn higher wages. Although these immigrants were earning a higher compensation in Canada compared to that in China, they experienced exclusion and occupational inequality. Even though the issue of racial exclusion is currently desensitised, there are workers who encounter violence and abuse in their working environment, a majority of which are women. Exporting labour to developed countries is still booming since it creates economic growth and diversity. The globalisation of labour eases the government debts and unemployment rates of developing countries. Women, especially in southeast Asian countries, are attracted to this money-making opportunity.

The mostly poor and low-wage women were often considered burdens rather than resources, but now an increasing number of women are earning a profit and securing government revenues. Several developing countries in southeast Asia, especially the Philippines, have seen the emergence of exporting labour to developed countries due to high foreign debt and unemployment. Filipino women working overseas in the United States of America sent home almost $8 billion a year in 2003, and most of these women entered the fields of health care, domestic service, and child care. Filipino overseas workers have earned the title of "migrant heroism" for sacrificing their family lives and normalising migration remittance-sending to their motherland. Not only do these women hold a higher responsibility in their family and country, but they are also faced with racialisation, violence and abuse.

=== Labour market ===
In the new era, women restricted the 'spatial reach' of their job searches due to childcare responsibilities. The open employment for middle-class women catalyses the growing use of domestic workers for household cleaning and childcare. There has been a complexity in the modern economy with women's responsibility at home and at work. Cultural theories maintain that lower wages in female-dominated occupations are the product of societal bias against the work typically carried out by women and that the sex composition of occupations affects wages directly. In contrast, recent human capital theories maintain that the wage penalties associated with working in female-dominated occupations result from different requirements in specialised training and that the effect is indirect. Many feminist scholars insist that sexual difference is the primary reason for differences between both sexes in the labour market outcomes.

Women face discrimination in the workplace, such as the "glass ceiling," although female participation in the labour market has increased markedly during the past twenty years. However, even with increased participation in the labour force and the high levels of commitment that women give to their workplace, women's work is still undervalued. Additionally, many times a woman's work schedule is structured in such a way that it conflicts with her care-giving responsibilities. The women who are also union members at work feel "side-lined" and "downgraded" about the workplace issues that they face that are apart from the union's agenda. However, high levels of unionisation strongly correlate with a lower wage gap as well as a lower gender gap. One way in which people have tried to help working women is through legislation. In late 2003, Norway passed a law that advocated for forty per cent of representation of gender public board companies. The main objective for this was to increase the representation of women in top positions in the top sector and decrease gender disparity. The result, however, had very little impact on women in business, especially those who made it into corporate sectors.

The "Glass ceiling" has proven to prevent women from attaining higher levels of professional success. The development of the glass ceiling has influenced gender discrepancies within the labour market. The development of the phenomenon is affected by several factors, such as gender roles, gender bias, and sexual harassment. In addition to outmoded institutional structures, conscious and unconscious biases play a substantial role in hindering the promotion of women within the labour force. Additionally, the difficulty of achieving senior and executive level positions is due to the practice of utilising "male" characteristics as the standard expectation when assessing, hiring, and promoting women workers. Despite the phenomenon, women have proven to be beneficial in business leadership. Researches have found that improvements within firm value, financial performance, economic growth, innovation, and philanthropy has been due to the inclusion of women leadership within companies.

On the other side, something that is often ignored is the "glass escalator", in which a man enters a female-dominated workplace and is quickly promoted through the ranks. Several fields such as education, nursing, and social work demonstrate this phenomenon. Many factors affect this outcome, such as societal pressure on men and women alike to conform to gender roles, i.e., men seeking managerial positions and women seeking more domestic roles. Also, even within female-dominated professions, men are usually the ones making promotion decisions.

Despite these setbacks, women have been performing their jobs well. Women make up 40.9% of the American workforce, and they are CEOs of some of the largest companies such as PepsiCo, Archer Daniels Midland, and W. L. Gore & Associates. Women also earn almost 60% of university degrees from America and Europe. They make up the majority of the professional workforce in many countries, for example, fifty-one per cent in the United States. Even with this high percentage, women's earnings are far less than what men are paid on average. They are also intensely under-represented at the top of their organisations. Surprisingly, feminisation of the workplace has been driven by the relentless drive of the service sector and the equal decline of manufacturing. More women than ever before are willing to work outside their homes. Even after having children, 74% of women in the workforce manage to return to work, and 40% return to their full-time jobs.

=== Science and technology ===
According to the American Association of University Women, young boys' and girls' capabilities and interests in science, mathematics and engineering are equally well established; however, most girls begin to lose their interest in their high school years because of the gap in gender representation in both science and engineering. As a result, women are underrepresented in science-related occupations due to the gendered interactions early in life. Researchers claim that the segregation of men and women into different occupations is the principal reason for earning differences between men and women. They argue that occupational segregation restricts people's choice of career. Researchers also observed both gender's general behaviours that can represent their preferred profession, finding that the boys are encouraged (and assumed) to be outgoing, analytical, and aggressive, while girls are encouraged (and assumed) to be passive, dependent, and nurturing.

In the last 25 years, increasing involvement of women and minorities has prevented a severe shortage of science and engineering workers; but if current rates of gender and ethnic participation in these bachelor's degree programmes do not change, the number of qualified workers will soon be inadequate to meet the science, technology, and engineering needs of society.

There is an under-representation of women in the STEM fields. According to a study done by the U.S. Department of Commerce, in the United States women account for approximately twenty-four per cent of the STEM workforce, while making up forty-eight per cent of the overall workforce. There are a variety of factors that contribute to this discrepancy such as lack of female role models, gender stereotypes, and sexism in hiring. The roots of under-representation are in grade school, where girls fall behind boys in math because they are led to believe they are not as intelligent as boys and therefore incapable of being good at math. Other influences include teachers, family, culture, stereotypes, and role models throughout school. Women are earning the same number of bachelor's degrees as men but only account for thirty per cent of STEM degrees. Women who earn these degrees are more likely to go into healthcare or education rather than STEM professions.

Women are adequately represented in healthcare professions. Women constitute for 44% of doctors and 89% of nursing, health visitation staff, and midwifery. However, women are disproportionately represented in different specialties in comparison to men. In surgical specialties, women represent 3.5% compared to 16% representation of men. In general practice, women represent 47% compared to 37% representation of men. The discrepancy between men and women in certain specialties are due to factors of inherent differences and discrimination within the workplace. Researchers argue that specialties within the medical field for women are influenced by personal affairs that include family commitments, work-life balance, and sense of selflessness. Additionally, researchers claim that women are deterred from pursuing certain clinical specialties due to difficulties of indirect discrimination such as a male dominated work culture, gender stereotypes, and unsocial hours. Despite these barriers, women in healthcare professions have proven to deliver better health intervention and health care system savings in comparison to their male counterparts.

The wage gap with in STEM jobs is smaller than in non-STEM jobs. Women in STEM careers earn thirty-five per cent more than women in non-STEM careers. They also earn more than men with non-STEM jobs. Female engineering majors match their male counterparts in number who go into the engineering occupation, but physical and life sciences majors turned toward a broader range of careers outside STEM. Within these career fields, there is a pattern of sexist hiring practices that lead to less women being hired in these fields. The lack of women in these fields creates a cold work environment that causes women to quit. In the life sciences, women are earning more doctorates than men, but only one-third are hired as assistant professors after completing their PhD. However, once hired, they are more likely to prosper in the STEM profession. Women who have a family are more likely to switch to a non-STEM major or work fewer hours than men in the same fields.

=== Sports ===
In the United States, women were seen as 'ill-equipped' to participate in sports, and their involvement was viewed as unfeminine and undesirable.

Today, women represent forty-one per cent of high school athletes and thirty-seven per cent of college athletes. Increasing numbers of women are participating in sports at the professional level as well. The passage of Title IX sparked the increase in women participating in sports throughout high school and college in the United States. Title IX of the 1972 Educational Amendments Act prohibits discrimination based on gender to any educational programme receiving federal funding. Since the passage of Title IX, women in collegiate sports has increased dramatically. In 1981 the number of women participating in collegiate sports was 74,329, and by 2001, that number increased to 150,916. In addition, the number of female participants have increased from about twenty-five per cent of the student athlete population to forty-two per cent. Before 1972 and the passage of Title IX, women were, for the most part, absent from sports in high school. In 1972 only one in twenty-seven women participated in high school sports, but by 1998 that statistic became one in three. Following the passage of Title IX, the number of girls participating in athletics rose from 294,015 to 817,073. After only six years that number increased even more to over two million girls getting involved in high school sports. Prior to 1972 girls only made up seven per cent of student athletes and that number rose to thirty-two per cent in 1978. This was a momentous time for women in sports because there was finally more representation across the board. Compared to women, one in two males participate in high school sports.

After the passing of Title IX, the number of women managing and coaching sports in general has decreased. The number of women in administrative positions within sports declined seventeen per cent from 1972 to 1987. It was also found that in Texas schools women only made up six per cent of the athletic directors and that in Florida only thirteen per cent were women. In addition to administrative positions, women coaches have seen a significant decline in count after Title IX was passed. In 1973, women coaches were at an all-time high of around eighty per cent, but over the next ten years that number rapidly declined to around forty per cent despite the increasing opportunities for women. Ever since Title IX was passed, female head coaches have been harder and harder to find, especially from 1977 to 1982, when there was a thirty-six per cent decrease. This issue has still not improved much since 1972, even though Title IX was implemented to prevent this from happening.

== Education sector ==
Women represent a significant majority of education professionals -- particularly in early childhood and elementary education. Not all roles of education sector are majority female, tertiary educators across the OECD in 2014 is 43% female.

Across the OECD 68% of teachers were female in 2014. Women make up 97% of teachers in pre-primary education, 82% in primary education, 63% in secondary education. In primary school, the proportion of female teachers exceeds 60% in all OECD countries apart Saudi Arabia and Turkey.

Between 1988 and 2012, the number of women employed in the United States' labour force accounted to 67 million; in those 24 years, there was a 56% increase in women teaching K-12 education.

== See also ==
- Feminisation (sociology)
- Women in the workforce
