= Posthegemony =

Concept in political philosophy

Posthegemony or post-hegemony is a period or a situation in which hegemony is no longer said to function as the organizing principle of a national or post-national social order, or of the relationships between and amongst nation states within the global order. The concept has different meanings within the fields of political theory, cultural studies, and international relations.

== In cultural studies ==
In the field of cultural studies, posthegemony has been developed as a concept by a number of critics whose work engages with and critiques the use of cultural hegemony theory within the writings of Ernesto Laclau and within subaltern studies. George Yúdice, in 1995, was one of the first commentators to summarize the background to the emergence of this concept:

Flexible accumulation, consumer culture, and the "new world information order" are produced or distributed (made to flow) globally, to occupy the space of the nation, but are no longer "motivated" by any essential connections to a state, as embodied, for example, in a "national-popular" formation. Their motivations are both infra- and supranational. We might say that, from the purview of the national proscenium, a posthegemonic situation holds. That is, the "compromise solution" that culture provided for Gramsci is not now one that pertains to the national level but to the local and transnational. Instead, the "culture-ideology of consumerism" serves to naturalize global capitalism everywhere [emphasis added].

The concept of posthegemony is related to the rise of the "multitude" as a social force which, unlike the "people", cannot be captured by hegemony, together with the roles of affect and habitus in mechanisms of social control and agency. Posthegemony and its related terms are influenced by Gilles Deleuze and Félix Guattari, Pierre Bourdieu and Michael Hardt and Antonio Negri's accounts of the supra- and infra-national forces that are said to have rendered obsolete the national-popular forms of coercion and consent through which, for Antonio Gramsci, hegemony structured and constituted society.

The features of posthegemony as a concept correspond closely to those of postmodernity. Thus, posthegemony theory argues that ideology is no longer a political driving force in mechanisms of social control and that the modernist theory of hegemony, which depends on ideology, therefore no longer accurately reflects the social order. Some commentators also argue that history is not, as Karl Marx described it, a class struggle, but rather a "struggle to produce class".

The concept of posthegemony also resonates with the work of post-Foucauldian theorists such as Giorgio Agamben. Nicholas Thoburn, drawing on Agamben's discussion on the "state of exception", writes that "it is, perhaps, with the recasting of the relationship between law and politico-military and economic crises and interventions that is instituted in the state of exception that the time of hegemony is most revealed to have passed."

== In international relations ==
In international relations, posthegemony refers to the decline of the US unilateral hegemony. This has likely been the result of the difficulties that have arisen out of the unilateral style foreign policy. These difficulties predominantly include disdain from; those directly affected by the, sometimes forceful, hegemonic actions of the US, those who spectated the actions, and even Americans themselves who view the actions of their government as immoral. For example, after the Vietnam War, in 1978, 72 per cent of Americans thought the war was not merely a gross mistake, but fundamentally wrong and immoral. This exemplifies the hegemonic decline: how could the US maintain the legitimacy of their interventions if their own citizens find them wrong and immoral?

The dominant power(s) of the world is/are fluid, the initial period of US unilateralism can be loosely pinpointed to their interventions during the world wars. Following this period of rising US dominance on the world stage,

there have been no shortage of people who, from the rise of the [Soviet Union's] space programme in the 1950s, through to the third world revolutions of the 1960s and 1970s in Vietnam, Iran and elsewhere, and to the emergence of Japan, Europe and now China as major economic powers, have predicted that US dominance, predominance, hegemony or, in more recent, post–Cold War terms, "unipolarity", are ebbing away.

The predictions of these individuals represent the fluidity of power over time, through the idea that, during the period where the US was unequivocally dominant, people could still see the inevitable future, of a change in power and authority, on the world stage.

== Criticism ==
Among the criticisms of the theory of posthegemony is Richard Johnson's, that it involves "a marked reduction of social complexity." Johnson concedes that "one considerable achievement of 'the post-hegemony project' is to draw many observable post-9/11 features into a single imaginative picture, while also synthesizing different currents in contemporary social theory." But he argues that "it is strange, however, that the result is viewed as the end of hegemony rather than as a new hegemonic moment." He, therefore, calls for a rejuvenation of the concept of hegemony, rather than its abandonment.

== See also ==
- Postnationalism
- James C. Scott
- Emerging power
- New world order (politics)
- Post-9/11
- Post–Cold War era
- Post-Western era

== Bibliography ==
- Beasley-Murray, Jon (2003). "On Posthegemony". Bulletin of Latin American Research. 22 (1): 117–125. doi:10.1111/1470-9856.00067.
- Beasley-Murray, Jon (2010). Posthegemony: Political Theory and Latin America. Minneapolis, Minnesota: University of Minnesota Press. ISBN 978-0-8166-4714-9.
- Hagopian, Patrick (2009). The Vietnam War in American Memory: Veterans, Memorials, and the Politics of Healing. Amherst, Massachusetts: University of Massachusetts Press. ISBN 978-1-55849-693-4.
- Halliday, Fred (2008). International Relations in a Post-Hegemonic Age (PDF) (Speech). Valedictory Lecture as Montague Burton Professor of International Relations. London: London School of Economics and Political Science.
- Hardt, Michael; Negri, Antonio (2000). Empire. Cambridge, Massachusetts: Harvard University Press. ISBN 978-0-674-25121-2.
- Hardt, Michael; Negri, Antonio (2004). Multitude: War and Democracy in the Age of Empire. London: Hamish Hamilton. ISBN 978-0-241-14240-0.
- Johnson, Richard (2007). "Post-hegemony? I Don't Think So". Theory, Culture & Society. 24 (3): 95–110. doi:10.1177/0263276407075958. ISSN 1460-3616. S2CID 144990811.
- Moreiras, Alberto (2001). The Exhaustion of Difference: The Politics of Latin American Cultural Studies. Durham, North Carolina: Duke University Press. ISBN 978-0-8223-2726-4.
- Thoburn, Nicholas (2007). "Patterns of Production: Cultural Studies after Hegemony" (PDF). Theory, Culture & Society. 24 (3): 79–94. doi:10.1177/0263276407075959. ISSN 1460-3616. S2CID 145746865.
- Williams, Gareth (2002). The Other Side of the Popular Neoliberalism and Subalternity in Latin America. Durham, North Carolina: Duke University Press. ISBN 978-0-8223-2925-1.
- Yúdice, George (1995). "Civil Society, Consumption, and Governmentality in an Age of Global Restructuring: An Introduction". Social Text (45): 1–25. ISSN 0164-2472. JSTOR 466672.
