= Tractatus =

Tractatus is Latin for "treatise". It may refer to:

- Tractatus de amore by Andreas Capellanus
- Tractatus Astrologico Magicus, also known as the Aldaraia and the Book of Soyga, a 16th-century Latin treatise on magic
- Tractatus coislinianus, an ancient manuscript on comedy in the tradition of Aristotle
- Tractatus Eboracenses (Tractates of York), dealing with the relationship between kings and the Catholic Church, c. 1100
- Tractatus of Glanvill, the Tractatus de legibus et consuetudinibus regni Angliae (Treatise on the laws and customs of the Kingdom of England), the book of authority on English common law, written c. 1188 and attributed to Ranulf de Glanvill
- Tractatus Logico-Philosophicus, a philosophical work by Ludwig Wittgenstein
- Tractatus de Purgatorio Sancti Patricii (Treatise on Saint Patrick's Purgatory), a Latin text of c. 1180–84
- Tractatus de Sphaera, or De sphaera mundi, the basic elements of astronomy written by Johannes de Sacrobosco c. 1230
- Tractatus de superstitionibus (disambiguation), a title shared by two medieval tractates on superstition

== By Baruch Spinoza ==
- Tractatus de Intellectus Emendatione (On The Improvement Of The Understanding), an unfinished work by Baruch Spinoza
- Tractatus Theologico-Politicus, a philosophical work by Spinoza
- Tractatus Politicus

== See also ==
- Tractate (disambiguation)
- Wittgenstein Tractatus (film), a film by Peter Forgacs
