= Multitude (philosophy) =

Philosophical term for "the many"

Jean Duvet's The Apocalypse: An Innumerable Multitude Which Stand before the Throne (1546–56), on Revelation 7

In philosophy, multitude often refers to a collective of people defined by common mode of existence, not shared identity. In ancient and medieval philosophy, thinkers explored the nature and role of "the many", typically in social and political contexts (increasingly the latter during the Middle Ages). The concept gained prominence in the 17th century through the work of Thomas Hobbes and Baruch Spinoza, who developed it as a technical term.

Focusing on mechanism in philosophy amid the Scientific Revolution, Hobbes sought to apply principles of classical mechanics to model human behavior and political organization. He saw the multitude as an unstable pre-political mass and said it benefited from cohesion and unification, which required the force of a social contract with a sovereign authority. At the time, there were disputes over absolute monarchy, which culminated in English Civil War.

In the prosperous, tolerant, and unstable Dutch Republic, Spinoza recognized the multitude's immanent potential for rational self-organization and collective power. While he saw it as foundational to democratic agency, he held reservations about its volatility, grounded in his theory of the affects. He stressed that the multitude's inadequate understanding made it liable to control by superstition or charismatic authority.

In contemporary philosophy, thinkers revived the concept mostly from Spinoza, while also drawing on the work of Karl Marx. Together, Michael Hardt and Antonio Negri reinterpreted the multitude more globally as a plural, autonomous, and radically democratic, even revolutionary, subject. They saw it as capable of resisting imperialism and the exploitation of labor, and of transforming political systems and institutions more broadly.

== Ancient origins ==
Whether as a term or concept, the multitude is mentioned in general, philosophical, and religious texts from antiquity, including ancient philosophy. The Book of Exodus is sometimes read as the story of Moses transforming a multitude bound by kinship and tribe into a people united by law and covenant with a supreme God, though this transformation remains incomplete amid persistent resistance. The multitude is also mentioned in texts attributed to Thucydides, Plato (e.g., Euthyphro), Aristotle, Polybius, and Cicero.

== Medieval philosophy ==
The multitude appears in medieval philosophy texts, including the works of Averroes and Thomas Aquinas.

In mid-13th century Italy, with the evolution of late medieval communes' political and legal practices, the institutionalized term popolo (people) obtained a more political and factional than social sense. In Italian city-states like Florence, Bologna, and Perugia, the people denoted citizens with political rights. Florence's 1293 Ordinances of Justice excluded magnates from government, and the people became less a social class than one crucial to regime change and relativized to (or even identified with) the ruling class.

In Summa theologica, Aquinas defined a people (Latin: populus) as an ordered multitude ("multitudo hominum sub aliquo ordinem comprehensorum"), not a disordered ("confusa") multitude lacking hierarchy or direction. Insofar as even the lowly class ("vilis populus") may be part of the ordered multitude, the sense is political, not social. Later theorists variously interpreted the matter, including Peter of Auvergne (in Quaestiones super libros Politicorum, 1296–1301), Marsilius of Padua (in Defensor pacis, 1324), and Bartolus de Saxoferrato (in De regimine civitatis).

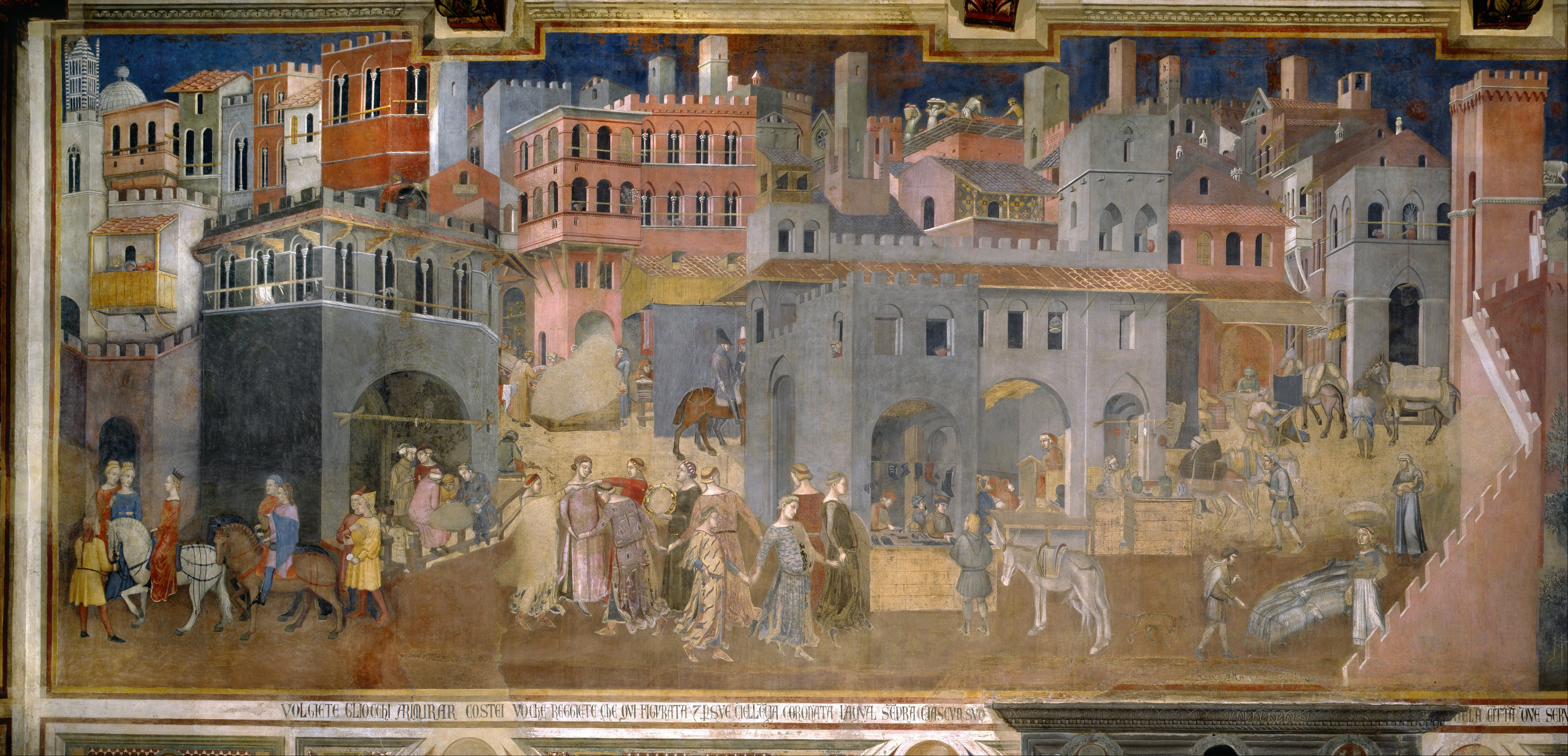
The Effects of Good Government in the City, from Ambrogio Lorenzetti's The Allegory of Good and Bad Government

== Renaissance thought ==
=== Machiavelli ===
Against historians who accused the multitude of being vain and inconstant, Niccolò Machiavelli argued in Discourses on Livy that the multitude is wiser and more constant than any prince, though prince and people alike swing between humble servility and proud domination. For Machiavelli, the true divide is between law and lawlessness (and yet, Machiavelli scholar Harvey Mansfield has observed, the multitude's laws are made by princes).

== Early modern philosophy ==
=== Hobbes ===
Impressed by Galileo Galilei's mechanics amid the Scientific Revolution, and against the backdrop of the English Civil War, including the Personal Rule, Hobbes theorized the multitude as a disorganized mass requiring the force of sovereign authority to unify. He saw the multitude as a rabble that needed to enact a social contract with a monarch, thus making them a people. Until then, he said, such masses retained individualistic capacity for political self-determination.

Arguing that private revelation cannot ground public law, Hobbes also vested sole authority to interpret prophetic revelation in the sovereign authorized by the multitude, thereby subordinating religion to politics for the sake of peace. He applied this to Biblical canonization, writing in Leviathan that the issue is not the (ostensibly undisputed) divine status of religious texts but "by what authority they are made law". (Note: English Wikisource has original text related to this article: Leviathan (1651)/Chapter 33)

=== Spinoza ===
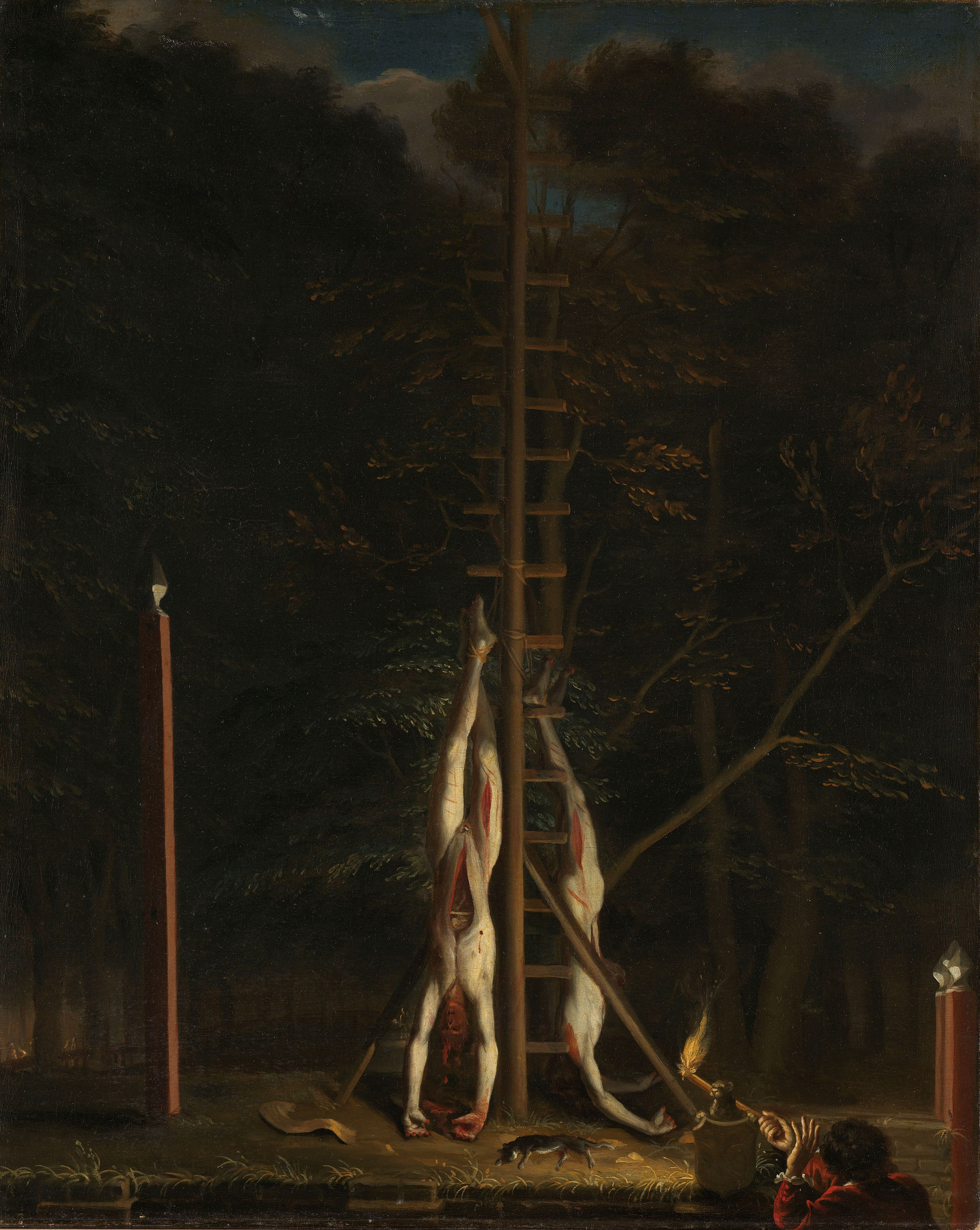
Jan de Baen's The Corpses of the De Witt Brothers

The multitude (Latin: multitudo; Dutch: veelheid) is a key concept in Spinoza's political philosophy. Building on his earlier use of vulgus (common people or crowd) (Note: Spinoza's vulgus may also be translated as mass, public, or volk, among other terms.) and Hobbes's technical use of multitude, Spinoza developed the concept amid war and civil conflict, which informed and motivated his work. His evolving attitude toward the multitude vacillated between admiration and contempt, reflecting his historical context and the logical refinement of his thought.

==== Background ====
Karel van Mander's Saint John the Baptist Preaching to the Multitude

Spinoza's concerns were shaped by civil instability in the Dutch Republic during the First Stadtholderless Period and after the Rampjaar. A period of relative freedom and tolerance gave way to civil disorder and war, including the Anglo-Dutch Wars and Franco-Dutch War. The turmoil culminated in Calvinist (Dutch Reformed Church) and Orangist mobs lynching Loevestein faction members Cornelis and Johan de Witt.

Spinoza believed Calvinist ministers deliberately fomented moral panics among their congregations. He worked to counter the "prejudices of theologians", he wrote thinker Henry Oldenburg in 1665, as "the main obstacles to ... philosoph[izing]". He aimed to "expos[e] such prejudices and remov[e] them from the minds of sensible people", thereby "vindicat[ing] completely" the freedom to philosophize, which he considered "suppressed by the excessive authority and egotism of the preachers". (Note: Curley noted that Spinoza's TTP was originally planned as broadly theological but ultimately included a political theory. Spinoza had already been accused of atheism, which he denied, and was commonly reputed to be an atheist, a matter that remains somewhat complex. Spinoza valued Scripture mostly from a moral perspective, not as history. He did not think it adequately conceived of God and semantically revised the term, specifically rejecting the anthropomorphism of God and the doctrines of miracles in religious texts. Curley wrote that Spinoza, while arguably no atheist, challenged the common idea of theism, making his position difficult to describe concisely.)

==== Texts ====
Selected Spinoza texts relating to the multitude or vulgus
Date	Title (Abbreviation)
1656/1657– (Note: The TIE was left unfinished and published posthumously in 1677.)	Tractatus de intellectus emendatione (TIE)
1660s–1675 (Note: The Ethics was begun in the early 1660s as an elaboration of the Korte verhandeling van God, de mensch en deszelvs welstand (KV), or Short Treatise of God, Man and His Well-Being (1660–1662), of which only a contemporary Dutch translation survived.)	Ethica ordine geometrico demonstrata (E)
1665–1669	Tractatus theologico-politicus (TTP)
1675– (Note: The TP was left unfinished and published posthumously in 1677.)	Tractatus politicus (TP)

Spinoza used multitudo mainly in the mature Tractatus politicus (TP), after earlier, more negative uses in the Tractatus theologico-politicus (TTP). He also used it to denote mathematical and metaphysical multiplicity. In the TP, multitudo largely replaces plebs (ordinary people or plebeians), populus (people), and vulgus. (Note: In the TP, vulgus reappears only once, where Spinoza defends it against Roman historians.)

Spinoza used vulgus pejoratively in the Ethics, TTP, and elsewhere. As he applied vulgus to many he deemed unreliable in capability or judgment, including philosophers, translations such as "mob", "rabble", or "the vulgar" are potentially misleading, though "mob" may be apt in political contexts.

===== TIE =====
In the Tractatus de Intellectus Emendatione (TIE), the young Spinoza desired the improvement of the vulgus, which he viewed with concern and hope. In seeking the path to the good life (eudaimonia), he contrasted their immediate or ostentatious materialistic concerns with the pursuit of knowledge and love of God, "the end for which I strive". Rather than condemning them, he hoped "many should acquire [this view] along with me", arguing that better education, medicine, and social order would not only be virtuous, but also instrumental in raising the vulgus to higher pursuits and greater capabilities.

===== Ethics and TTP =====
In mid-1660s Amsterdam, amid political factionalism, riots, and war, Spinoza became fearful of the vulgus. He was especially concerned by the dominant role of religion in politics and its threat to freedom of thought. He described the vulgus as "terrifying if unafraid" in the Ethics, referring both to the fear felt by the masses and the fear they inspire, and showing concern for crowd psychology. (Note: Latin Wikisource has original text related to this article: Ethica/Pars quarta – De servitute humana seu de affectuum viribus. The scholium (note) to Propositio LIV reads in part, "Terret vulgus nisi metuat". English Wikisource has original text related to this article: Ethics (Spinoza)/Part 4 (in Elwes's 1883 translation). The Note to Proposition LIV reads in part, "The crowd plays the tyrant, when it is not in fear". Curley translated this passage, "The mob is terrifying, if unafraid.") Pausing work on the Ethics to begin the Tractatus theologico-politicus (TTP), he sought to understand events through the concept of the multitude and, more broadly, to understand people's affects, or confused ideas and passions, in order to promote peace and more stable political institutions.

In the TTP, Spinoza called democracy the "most natural" and "best" form of state (civitas). He held that democracy was the form of state most likely to secure freedom and peace, which he regarded as the state's chief aims. Since democracy requires the vulgus, this left a key tension in Spinoza's political philosophy and posed the question: how does the vulgus give rise to the "best" state? In Spinoza's Hebrew republic reading, the multitude becomes a free people when shared beliefs overcome social closure to unite individuals around the common good.

A 1665 Dutch political broadside illustrating a crowd's imagination

For Spinoza, all governments mobilize the multitude's imagination, passions, and beliefs, with political theology resting on the moral certainty that prophetic imagination offers. Whereas "the prophet's authority and the confidence he enjoys" depend on collective belief, Spinoza wrote, modern rulers inherit prophets' role: "sovereign powers are the interpreters of their own sovereign right", their laws "upheld only by their own sovereign authority ... supported only by their own testimony". Yet because authority rests on shared narratives and values, the multitude's imagination can sustain domination or transform the political community.

===== TP =====
In the Tractatus politicus (TP), Spinoza drew on the Ethics' theories of affects and power, seeking a way for the multitude, like individuals in the Ethics, to be ruled less by fear. Here the term denotes a large aggregate of people, organized or not, often moved by (shared) affect but ideally united by reason in a union of minds (acting with "one mind"). One reading of Spinoza's moral and political philosophy holds that our greatest good lies in "living in a community with other people, and binding ourselves to our fellow citizens ... 'to make us one people'". (Note: In the TTP, Spinoza wrote that such association was necessary for security, enjoyment, prosperity, the division of labor, and the flourishing of art, science, and understanding.) Doing so rationally and virtuously, however, is a supreme challenge. (Note: In practice, Spinoza wrote, everyone must contract to act in common as determined and redetermined by voting, though they inevitably think freely. This comes closest to the natural condition, he argued, and "the more we depart from [it], ... the more violent the government".) The individual's task in the Ethics, overcoming bondage to the passions, thus became the task of the entire community in Spinoza's mature political philosophy.

In the TP, the multitude's power arose from the aggregation and organization of individuals, and Spinoza, seeing natural right as coextensive with power, drew relations between individual and sovereign, and between multitude and state. The multitude's power depended not only on number but also on the manner of agreement among its individuals. Less adequate ideas and passive affects like fear diminished collective power, whereas more adequate ideas and active affects like joy increased it by fostering unity. To cultivate these conditions, Spinoza recommended democracy, broadly conceived, as the best form of government and favored large, deliberative, popular councils, postulating their epistemic advantages.

Whereas the TTP described democracy as the "freest" or "most natural" regime, the TP called it the "most absolute" or "best" because it best preserved natural rights and maximized the state's power. (Note: Spinoza's Latin: "Transeo tandem ad tertium, et omnino absolutum imperium, quod Democraticum appellamus." Latin Wikisource has original text related to this article: Tractatus Politicus#CAPUT XI) The state's chief aim accordingly shifted from freedom to prosperity and stability, both of which required "absolute" sovereign power, denoting full (not unlimited) sovereign power. (Note: The Latin absolutus, the past participle of absolvere, had established technical senses of "finished", "complete", and "brought to a conclusion", alongside a more rhetorical sense of "unrestricted" or "unconditional". Latin Wikisource has original text related to this article: Tractatus Politicus#CAPUT V) This power exceeded clerical authority in principle but remained defined in relation to the multitude as one possible limit among many: in Spinoza's immanent naturalism, just as God is identified with Nature in the Ethics, (Note: Spinoza's Latin: "Deus sive Natura") sovereign power remains natural rather than transcendent ("Kings are not Gods, but men", he wrote).

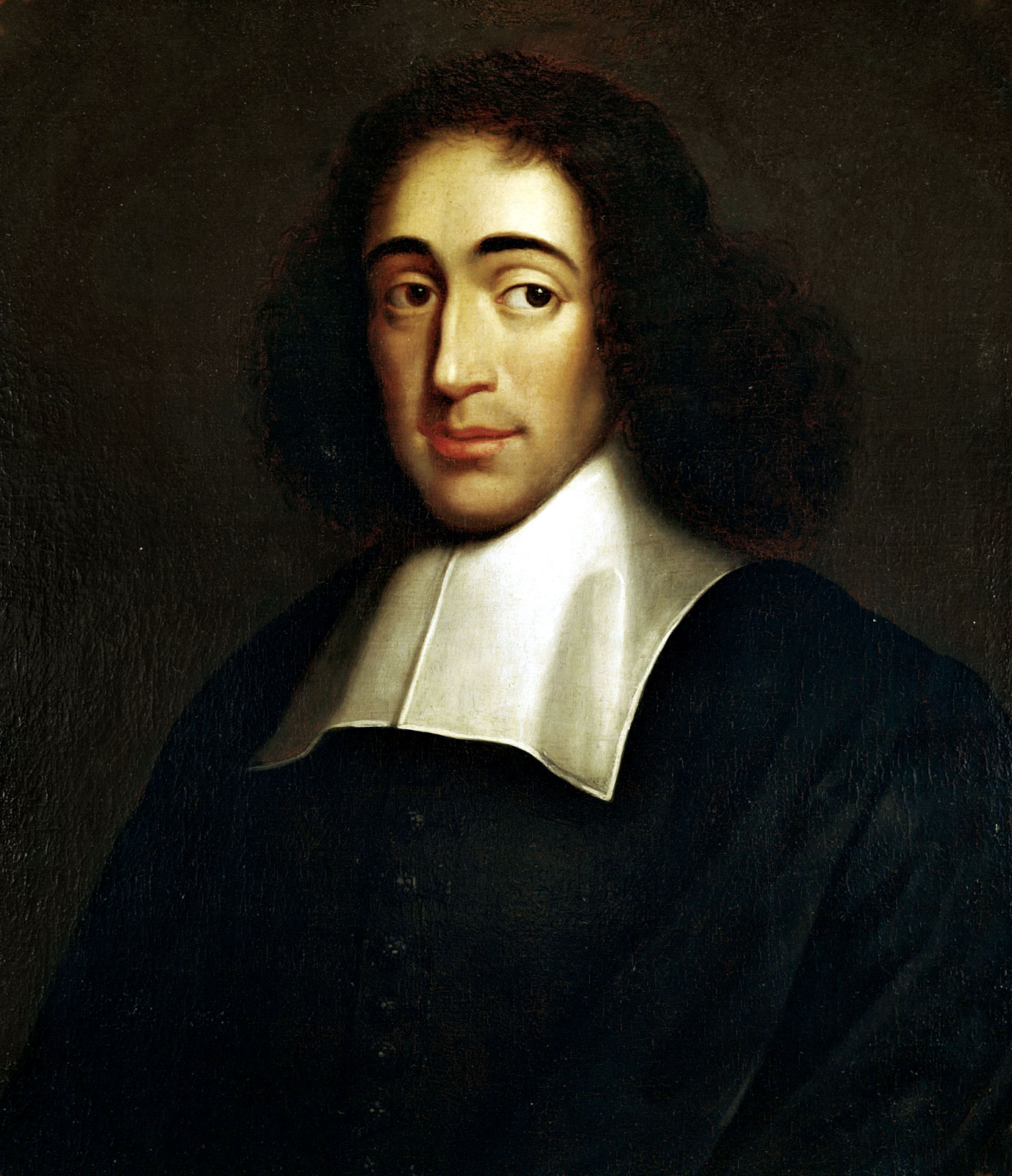
Spinoza, anonymous portrait

==== Reception ====
Many twentieth-century commentators argued that Spinoza had effectively abandoned democracy in the TP, but many others argued he was merely refining his theories of affects, power, and the multitude. On the right, Leo Strauss emphasized Spinoza's fear of the masses, interpreting his political philosophy as guidance for an elite. Indeed, Spinoza asked unprepared commoners not to read his TTP, arguing it exceeded their capacities and would be misinterpreted, though the work is arguably his most positive about democracy.

While many or probably most contemporary Spinoza scholars reject Strauss's views, some secondary literature shows Strauss's influence, including that of Raia Prokhovnik, Alexandre Matheron, Steven B. Smith, and, to some extent, Étienne Balibar. Matheron, Prokhovnik, and Smith held that Spinoza ultimately rejected democracy in the TP. He may have seen aristocracy as the best possibility, Matheron and Prokhovnik wrote, given democracy's obstinate tension with reason. Smith identified this aristocracy as a philosophical clerisy. Ericka Tucker, surveying Spinozist scholarship, cast doubt on this interpretation. (Note: She noted a rejection of these views in "Steinberg (2009)", referring to either Diane Steinberg's study of Spinoza's epistemology and philosophy of mind, "Knowledge in Spinoza's Ethics", or Justin Steinberg's on the continuity between Spinoza's Ethics and his political philosophy, "Spinoza on Civil Liberation". D. Steinberg argued that Spinoza may have held the nonstandard view that knowledge ("cognitio"), limited in adequacy by an apparently infinite (unlimited) regress of finite, remote causes, need not involve belief. He distinguished three kinds of knowledge: opinion or imagination, reasoning from "common notions", and a third kind that may be both deductive and reductive. Likely rejecting doxastic voluntarism, he held that suspension of judgment is an involuntary, necessary predicament of inadequacy and that error arises from ignorance. He likely held that the relative force and coherence of competing ideas, rather than beliefs as such, determine which become dominant, though none need prevail conclusively.) Balibar was more nuanced: he agreed that Spinoza expressed fear of the labile masses but argued that Spinoza's pro-democratic arguments stood.

Claiming consensus, Tucker emphasized that while Spinoza consistently expressed concern about the multitude, his attitude was complex, vacillating, and deeply connected with his views on democracy. She proposed that he ultimately developed a theory of the multitude as something to be understood, not feared, to sustain institutions, peace, and prosperity within democratic states. Nonetheless, Spinoza's concept of the multitude differs from the later, radically democratic or even revolutionary interpretation by Hardt and Negri, who optimistically counter Spinoza's caution about the vulgus.

== Contemporary philosophy ==
Since the 20th century, the concept has been revived within broadly Marxist philosophy to describe a new model of resistance against global systems of power. Hardt and Negri describe it as such in Empire (2000), expanding upon this description in Multitude: War and Democracy in the Age of Empire (2004). Other theorists to use the term include those associated with Autonomism, like Sylvère Lotringer and Paolo Virno. Still others are connected with the eponymous French journal Multitudes, including Laurent Bove and Pierre-François Moreau. In this context, it approximates transnational or global social movements.

=== Hardt and Negri ===
Negri describes the multitude in his The Savage Anomaly as an unmediated, revolutionary, immanent, and positive collective social subject which can found a "nonmystified" form of democracy (p. 194). In his more recent writings with Michael Hardt, however, he does not so much offer a direct definition, but presents the concept through a series of mediations. In Empire, it is mediated by the concept of Empire, the new global constitution that Negri and Hardt describe as a copy of Polybius's description of Roman government:

New figures of struggle and new subjectivities are produced in the conjecture of events, in the universal nomadism [...]. They are not posed merely against the imperial system—they are not simply negative forces. They also express, nourish, and develop positively their own constituent projects. ... This constituent aspect of the movement of the multitude, in its myriad faces, is really the positive terrain of the historical construction of Empire, ... an antagonistic and creative positivity. The deterritorializing power of the multitude is the productive force that sustains Empire and at the same time the force that calls for and makes necessary its destruction.

They were vague as to this "positive" or "constituent" aspect of the multitude:

Certainly, there must be a moment when reappropriation [of wealth from capital] and self-organization [of the multitude] reach a threshold and configure a real event. This is when the political is really affirmed—when the genesis is complete and self-valorization, the cooperative convergence of subjects, and the proletarian management of production become a constituent power. ... We do not have any models to offer for this event. Only the multitude through its practical experimentation will offer the models and determine when and how the possible becomes real.

In their sequel Multitude: War and Democracy in the Age of Empire they still refrain from a clear definition of the concept but approach the concept through mediation of a host of "contemporary" phenomena, most importantly the new type of postmodern war they postulate and the history of post-WWII resistance movements. It remains a rather vague concept which is assigned a revolutionary potential without much theoretical substantiation apart from a generic potential of love.

==== Reception ====
In the Introduction to Virno's A Grammar of the Multitude, Lotringer criticized Hardt's and Negri's use of the concept for its ostensible return to dialectical dualism.

== See also ==
- Collective behavior
- Feeding the multitude
- Global citizens movement
- Hoi polloi
- Mass movement
- Mass society
- Mathesis universalis
- Pluralism
- Public opinion
- Populism
- Spectacle (critical theory)
- What Is the Third Estate?
