= Gopal Balakrishnan =

American philosopher

- Born: February 27, 1966 (age 60); New Delhi, India
- Occupation: scholar

Academic background
- Education: University of California, Los Angeles (Ph.D., 1998) (M.A., 1993); Cornell University (B.A., 1989)
- Thesis: 'The Enemy: An Intellectual Portrait of Carl Schmitt' (1998)
- Doctoral advisor: Robert Brenner, Perry Anderson

Academic work
- Discipline: Historian
- Sub-discipline: European Intellectual History
- Institutions: University of California, Santa Cruz (2005-2019); University of Chicago (2001-2005)
- Website: gopal-balakrishnan.com

Gopal Balakrishnan (born February 27, 1966) is an American historian and scholar of European intellectual history and political theory. He served as professor in the History of Consciousness Department at the University of California, Santa Cruz from 2015 to 2019.

== Education ==
Balakrishnan completed a Bachelor of Arts degree at Cornell University in 1989. He later studied European intellectual history and historical sociology at UCLA during the 1990s with Perry Anderson, Robert Brenner, Rogers Brubaker, and Michael Mann. He received a Master of Arts degree from UCLA in 1993 and completed his Ph.D. in 1998. His doctoral dissertation, The Enemy: An Intellectual Portrait of Carl Schmitt, examined the political thought of the German legal theorist Carl Schmitt and later formed the basis of his book of the same name. His research during this period focused on political thought, intellectual history, and critical theory.

== Career ==
After completing his doctorate in 1998, Balakrishnan held a postdoctoral fellowship at the University of Chicago. In 2001 he joined the University of Chicago faculty, where he taught until 2005.

Balakrishnan joined the University of California, Santa Cruz as a faculty member in 2005. In 2006, he was appointed associate professor in the university’s History of Consciousness Department. In 2015, he was promoted to professor and granted tenure.

=== Scholarly Work ===
Balakrishnan’s academic work has been the subject of discussion in several independent scholarly publications. A review in the American Historical Review characterized his book The Enemy: An Intellectual Portrait of Carl Schmitt as a systematic study that situates Schmitt’s political theory within the broader crises of twentieth-century European history.

In a review for Newsday, critic Scott McLemee described The Enemy: An Intellectual Portrait of Carl Schmitt as a “stimulating” examination of Schmitt’s political thought, noting that the book engages with themes that remain unsettling in contemporary debates. In Boston Review, William E. Scheuerman praised Balakrishnan’s The Enemy for “usefully highlight[ing] those facets of [Schmitt’s] thinking that anticipate present‑day left‑wing political and intellectual concerns.”

In his book Antagonistics: Capitalism and Power in an Age of War (2009), Balakrishnan analyzed the global political economy and the geopolitical dynamics of contemporary capitalism.

From 1995 to 2017, he published essays in New Left Review on geopolitics, sovereignty, and economic stagnation that have been referenced in critical-theory scholarship for their engagement with debates on state power and the long-term trajectory of global capitalism.

=== Controversy ===
In 2017, a number of people published allegations that Balakrishnan had committed sexual assault on multiple occasions. UC Santa Cruz launched an investigation in 2017 that was extended in May 2018. In October 2018, Balakrishnan remained on paid administrative leave. He subsequently resigned as a member of the editorial board of the New Left Review. In September 2019, he was fired from his position at UCSC, becoming the first tenured faculty member to be fired at UCSC.

== Selected publications ==
=== Books ===
- Balakrishnan, Gopal; Anderson, Benedict, eds. (1996). Mapping the nation. Verso.
- Balakrishnan, Gopal (2000). The enemy: an intellectual portrait of Carl Schmitt. Verso.
- Balakrishnan, Gopal, ed. (2003). Debating Empire. Verso.
- Balakrishnan, Gopal (2009). Antagonistics: capitalism and power in an age of war. Verso.

=== Articles ===
- Balakrishnan, Gopal (September–October 2000). "Hardt and Negri's Empire". New Left Review. II (5). New Left Review.

Review of the book Empire by Michael Hardt and Antonio Negri.

- Balakrishnan, Gopal (September–October 2003). "Algorithms of war". New Left Review. II (23). New Left Review.

Review of the book The Shield of Achilles by Philip Bobbitt.

- Balakrishnan, Gopal (September–October 2009). "Speculations on the stationary state". New Left Review. II (59). New Left Review.
- Balakrishnan, Gopal (November–December 2010). "The coming contradiction". New Left Review. II (66). New Left Review.

Review of the book Valences of the Dialectic by Frederic Jameson.
