= Tractate =

Tractate, a written work dealing formally and systematically with a subject, may refer to:

- Masekhet, an organizational element of Talmudic literature
- Minor tractate, a group of essays on Jewish religious laws
- Treatise, a formal and systematic written discourse on some subject

== See also ==
- Tract (disambiguation)
- Tractatus (disambiguation)
