= The Great Recoil =

2021 book by Paolo Gerbaudo

The Great Recoil: Politics After Populism and Pandemic
- Author: Paolo Gerbaudo
- Language: English
- Genre: Non-fiction
- Publisher: Verso Books
- Publication place: United Kingdom

The Great Recoil: Politics After Populism and Pandemic is a 2021 book by Paolo Gerbaudo, a professor of digital politics at King's College London. The book examines the impact of the rise of populism in the 21st century and the COVID-19 pandemic on neo-liberalism. Gerbaudo argues that they have led to a "great recoil" from dominant neo-liberal globalisation, including the emergence of a greater focus on state interventionism and greater prominence given to notions of national sovereignty in public discourse. He then argues that the left needs to find a way to respond effectively to this recoil.

== Reception ==
Michael Burleigh of the Literary Review wrote that the book "should be essential reading for those interested in the current state of European social democracy." Jasmine Liu of the Chicago Review of Books wrote that the book argues that the COVID-19 pandemic "has forced a brute reckoning with the ravages of neoliberalism" and that the book "convincingly pulls off is a postmortem of early 2000s utopianism of the type laid out in Empire." Writing for Verso Books, Gabriel Hetland wrote that the book argues that "the vacuum left by the fall of neoliberal hegemony was first filled by right-wing nationalist populism" but that "Gerbaudo’s distinction between territorial sovereignty, controlled by the Right, and popular sovereignty, fails to capture the continuing salience that “the national question” has for the Left in regions such as Latin America."

Marco Bitschnau of the University of Neuchâtel wrote that the book touches "extensively about sovereignty, protection and control, but the relationship between them remains opaque and many details appear superfluous" and that Gerbaudo's "analysis is more astute than the utopian dreams of the Occupy crowd. And yet, there are striking similarities, especially his conviction that we are witnessing a real paradigm shift rather than a straw fire."
