= Commonwealth (Hardt and Negri book) =

2009 book by Michael Hardt and Atonio Negri

- Authors: Michael Hardt; Antonio Negri
- Language: English
- Subjects: Globalization international relations
- Publisher: Harvard University Press
- Publication date: 2009
- Publication place: United States
- Media type: Print
- ISBN: 9780674060289 (paperback)
- Dewey Decimal: 321.02 H26
- Preceded by: Multitude: War and Democracy in the Age of Empire

Commonwealth is a book by autonomous Marxist theorists Michael Hardt and Antonio Negri that was published in 2009. It completes a trilogy which includes Empire (2000) and Multitude: War and Democracy in the Age of Empire (2004).

The influence of the book has paralleled the rise of the "common" as a concept at the center of the political and cultural debate.

== Overview ==
In Part 1 of the book the authors introduce the concept of "the republic of property". They state that "What is central for our purposes here is that the concept of property and the defense of property remain the foundation of every modern political constitution. This is the sense in which the republic, from the great bourgeois revolutions to today, is a republic of property".

In Part 2 the authors deal with the relationship between modernity and anti-modernity and end up proposing what they call "altermodernity". Altermodernity "involves not only insertion in the long history of antimodern struggles but also rupture with any fixed dialectic between modern sovereignty and antimodern resistance. In the passage from antimodernity to altermodernity, just as tradition and identity are transformed, so too resistance takes on a new meaning, dedicated now to the constitution of alternatives. The freedom that forms the base of resistance, as we explained earlier, comes to the fore and constitutes an event to announce a new political project."

== Reception ==
For Alex Callinicos, "what is newest in Commonwealth is its take on the fashionable idea of the common. Hardt and Negri mean by this not merely the natural resources that capital seeks to appropriate, but also "the languages we create, the social practices we establish, the modes of sociality that define our relationships", which are both the means and the result of biopolitical production. Communism, they argue, is defined by the common, just as capitalism is by the private and socialism (which they identify in effect with statism) with the public."

Writing for Artforum, David Harvey critiques the approach taken by Hardt and Negri in Commonwealth: "In the search for an altermodernity—something that is outside the dialectical opposition between modernity and antimodernity—they need a means of escape. The choice between capitalism and socialism is, they suggest, all wrong. We need to identify something entirely different—communism—working within a different set of dimensions." Harvey also questions the authors' claim that in order to contend with what they call the "republic of property," revolutionary ideology "should not shun identity politics but instead must work through it and learn from it." Whereas Negri and Hardt argue that identity politics is the "primary vehicle for struggle within and against the republic of property since identity itself is based on property and sovereignty," Harvey argues that they make a mistake when then they "dismiss Slavoj Žižek’s contention that there is something far more foundational about class than there is about all the other forms of identity in relation to the perpetuation of capitalism." Harvey continues: "No matter how important race, gender, and sexual identity may have been in the history of capitalism’s development, and no matter how important the struggles waged in their name, it is possible to envisage the perpetuation of capitalism without them—something that is impossible in the case of class" In a response published alongside David Harvey's review, Michael Hardt and Antonio Negri suggest that Harvey has mistaken their use of "singularity" in Commonwealth for the "mathematical notion of singularity, roughly in line with Badiou’s thought, which differs significantly from ours. We instead define the concept of singularity, contrasting it to the figure of the individual on the one hand and forms of identity on the other, by focusing on three aspects of its relationship to multiplicity: Singularity refers externally to a multiplicity of others; is internally divided or multiple; and constitutes a multiplicity over time—that is, a process of becoming."

== See also ==
- Autonomism
