= Declaration (book) =

- First edition
- Author: Michael Hardt, Antonio Negri
- Publisher: Argo-Navis
- Publication date: May 2012

Declaration was originally a self-published electronic pamphlet by Michael Hardt and Antonio Negri on the Occupy movement that was released as a "Kindle single" in May 2012. The book explores the new democratic politics of organization, representation, and resistance that have been inaugurated by the movement. It has since been published in paper form by Argo-Navis.

An excerpt from the introduction was published in Jacobin magazine under the title "Take Up the Baton".
