= Tractatus de Intellectus Emendatione =

Unfinished work by Baruch Spinoza

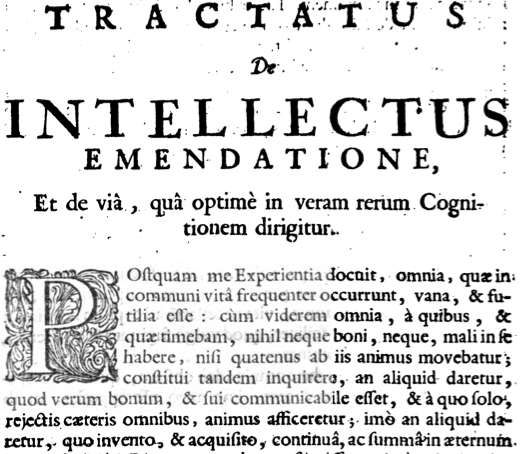
- Title page of Spinoza's TIE from the Opera Posthuma
- Author: Baruch Spinoza

Tractatus de Intellectus Emendatione (Treatise on the Emendation of the Intellect) is an unfinished work of philosophy by the seventeenth-century philosopher Baruch Spinoza, published posthumously in 1677.

== Summary ==
The Tractatus was first published in 1677, the year of Spinoza's death, by some of his closest friends, along with other works including the Ethica and the Tractatus Politicus. It is an attempt to formulate a philosophical method that would allow the mind to form the clear and distinct ideas that are necessary for its perfection. It contains, in addition, reflection upon the various kinds of knowledge, an extended treatment of definition, and a lengthy analysis of the nature and causes of doubt. He discusses, among other topics, perception, experience, intelligence, memory, and forgetting.

== Themes ==
Spinoza commenced this treatise with the intention of examining the problem of knowledge, but the work was never completed. In his other works epistemological discussions are intimately linked with the rest of his philosophy. Indeed, even in the Treatise on the Improvement of the Understanding epistemological views are almost inseparably connected with ethical ones. That is the consequence of his characteristic conception of knowledge. For Spinoza "knowledge" is "life", not in the sense that contemplation is the highest life, but in the sense that knowledge is the means of holding together the threads of life in a systematic unity that can fill its proper place in the cosmic system.

There are two things which must be borne in mind in connection with Spinoza's conception of knowledge. The first is his insistence on the active character of knowledge. The ideas or concepts by means of which thought constructs reality are not like "lifeless pictures on a panel"; they are activities by which reality is apprehended; they are part of reality, and reality is activity. The second point is that Spinoza does not divorce knowing from willing. Man always acts according to his lights. If a man's endeavours appear to fall short of his knowledge, that is only because his knowledge is not really what it is held to be, but is wanting in some respect. On the one hand, reason, for Spinoza, is essentially the "practical reason". On the other hand, the highest expression of willing is experienced in that striving for consistency and harmony which is so characteristic of reason.

== English translations ==
- 1884 by R. H. L. Elwes, an abriged version in the second volume of The Chief Works of Benedict de Spinoza (George Bell & Sons, London).
- 1958 by Joseph Katz (The Library of Liberal Arts, New York).
- 1985 by Edwin Curley, in the first volume of The Collected Works of Spinoza (Princeton University Press).
- 2002 by Samuel Shirley, in Spinoza's Complete Works, with introduction and notes by Michael L. Morgan (Hacket Publications).

== Bibliography ==
- Pringle-Pattison, Andrew Seth (1911). "Spinoza, Baruch" . In Chisholm, Hugh (ed.). Encyclopædia Britannica. Vol. 25 (11th ed.). Cambridge University Press. pp. 687–691.
- Chisholm, Hugh, ed. (1911). "Cartesianism" . Encyclopædia Britannica. Vol. 5 (11th ed.). Cambridge University Press. p. 422.
