= Tract =

Tract may refer to:

== Geography and real estate ==
- Housing tract, an area of land that is subdivided into smaller individual lots
- Land lot or tract, a section of land
- Census tract, a geographic region defined for the purpose of taking a census

== Writings ==
- Tract (literature), a short written work, usually of a political or religious nature
- Tract (liturgy), a component of Roman Catholic liturgy
- Treatise

== Biology ==
- Nerve tract, a bundle of fibers that connects different parts of the central nervous system - analogous to a nerve in the peripheral nervous system
- A genetic tract, a sequence of repeating nucleotides or amino acids, such as a polyglutamine tract
- A collection of related anatomic structures, such as:
  - Gastrointestinal tract
  - Genitourinary tract
  - Reproductive tract
  - A grouping of feathers, e.g. primaries, auricular, scapular

== Businesses ==
- Tract (imprint), an imprint of the German group VDM Publishing devoted to the reproduction of Wikipedia content

== See also ==
- Track (disambiguation)
