= Tractatus de superstitionibus =

Tractatus de superstitionibus is a title shared by two different medieval literary works by the following:

- Nicholas Magni (1405)
- Martin of Arles (1515)
