= Michael Hardt =

American philosopher (1960-)

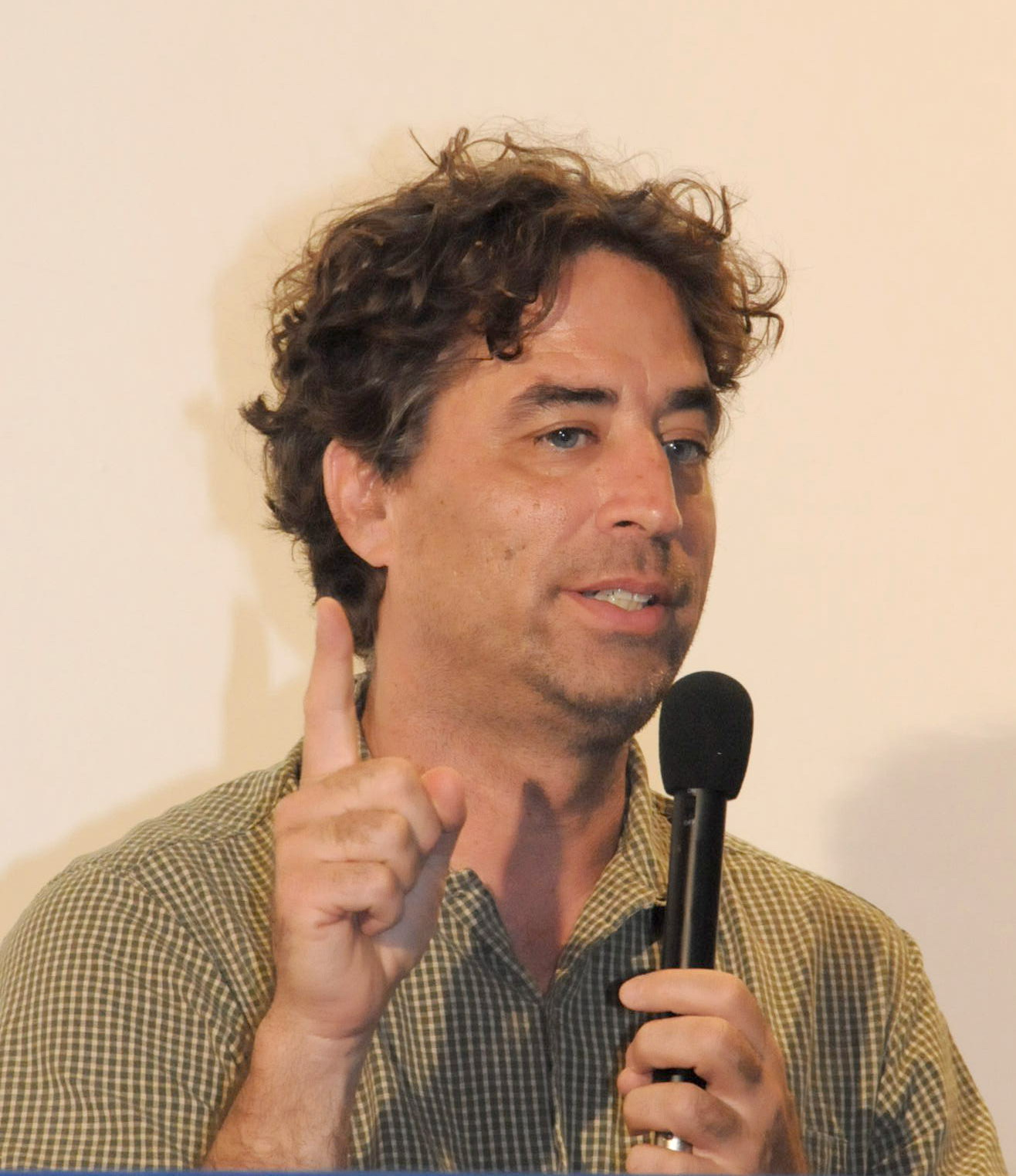
- Michael Hardt speaking at the Seminário Internacional Mundo. 2008
- Born: 1960 (age 65–66); Bethesda, Maryland, U.S.

Education
- Education: Swarthmore College (B.S.); University of Washington (M.A.; Ph.D.)

Philosophical work
- Era: 20th-century philosophy
- Region: Western philosophy
- School: Continental philosophy Autonomism
- Main interests: Political philosophy Literary theory
- Notable ideas: Theory of Empire, altermodernity

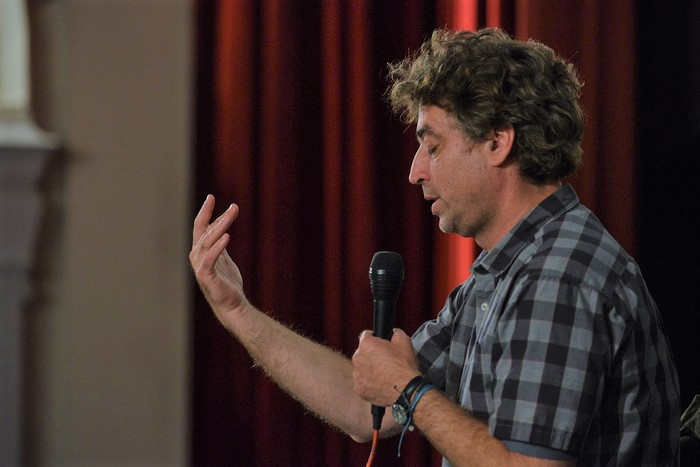
Michael Hardt speaking at Subversive Festival

Michael Hardt (born 1960) is an American political philosopher and literary theorist. Hardt is best known for his 2000 book Empire, which was co-written with Antonio Negri.

Hardt and Negri suggest that several forces which they see as dominating contemporary life, such as class oppression, globalization and the commodification of services (or production of affects), have the potential to spark social change of unprecedented dimensions. A sequel, Multitude: War and Democracy in the Age of Empire was published in August 2004. It outlines an idea first propounded in Empire, which is that of the multitude as possible locus of a democratic movement of global proportions. The third and final part of the trilogy, Commonwealth, was published in 2009.

== Early life and education ==
Hardt attended Winston Churchill High School in Potomac, Maryland. He studied engineering at Swarthmore College in Pennsylvania from 1978 to 1983. In college during the 1970s energy crisis, he began to take an interest in alternative energy sources. Talking about his college politics, he said, "I thought that doing alternative energy engineering for third world countries would be a way of doing politics that would get out of all this campus political posing that I hated. It seemed that way, but I was quickly disabused."

During college, he worked for various solar energy companies. Hardt also participated, after college, in the Sanctuary Movement and later helped establish a project to bring donated computers from the United States and put them together for the University of El Salvador. Yet, he says that this political activity did more for him than it did for the Salvadorans.

In 1983, he moved to Seattle to study comparative literature at the University of Washington. While working on his PhD, Hardt began to translate Antonio Negri's book on Baruch Spinoza, The Savage Anomaly, in order to come into contact with him. He first met Negri in Paris in the summer of 1986 to discuss translation difficulties. After their meeting, Hardt decided to complete his graduate exams and move to Paris the following summer. He received an M.A. in 1986 and completed his dissertation on Gilles Deleuze in 1990, with which he earned his PhD.

After briefly teaching at the University of Southern California, Hardt began teaching in the Literature Program at Duke University in 1994. He is currently professor of Literature and Italian at Duke.

== Thought ==
Hardt is concerned with the joy of political life, and has stated, "One has to expand the concept of love beyond the limits of the couple." The politics of the multitude is not solely about controlling the means of productivity or liberating one's own subjectivity. These two are also linked to love and joy of political life and realizing political goals.

Hardt does not consider teaching a revolutionary occupation, nor does he think the college is a particularly political institution. "But thinking of politics now as a project of social transformation on a large scale, I'm not at all convinced that political activity can come from the university."

Hardt says visions of a public education and equal and open access to the university are gradually disappearing: the "war on terror" has promoted only limited military and technological knowledges, while the required skills of the biopolitical economy, "the creation of ideas, images, code, affects, and other immaterial goods" are not yet recognized as the primary key to economic innovation. Many of Hardt's works have been co-written with Antonio Negri.

== Occupation movements of 2011–2012 ==
In May 2012 Hardt and Negri self-published an electronic pamphlet on the occupation and encampment movements of 2011–2012 called Declaration that argues the movement explores new forms of democracy.

== Publications ==
=== Books ===
==== Single-authored ====
- Gilles Deleuze: an Apprenticeship in Philosophy, ISBN 0-8166-2161-6, 1993
- The Subversive Seventies, ISBN 978-0197674659, 2023

==== With Antonio Negri ====
- Labor of Dionysus: a Critique of the State-form, ISBN 0-8166-2086-5, 1994
- Empire, ISBN 0-674-00671-2, 2000
- Multitude: War and Democracy in the Age of Empire, ISBN 1-59420-024-6, 2004
- Commonwealth, ISBN 0-674-03511-9, 2009
- Declaration, ISBN 0-786-75290-4, 2012
- Assembly, ISBN 978-0190677961, 2017

=== Selected articles ===
- Hardt, Michael (1995). "The Withering of Civil Society". Social Text (45): 27–44. doi:10.2307/466673. JSTOR 466673.
- Hardt, Michael (1997). "Prison Time". Yale French Studies (91): 64–79. doi:10.2307/2930374. JSTOR 2930374.
- "The Global Society of Control". Discourse. 20 (3): 139–152. 1998.
- "Affective Labor". boundary 2. 26 (2): 89–100. 1999.
- Hardt, Michael (2001). "Sovereignty". Theory and Event. 5 (4). doi:10.1353/tae.2001.0040. S2CID 244692620.
- "Porto Alegre: Today's Bandung?". New Left Review. II (14). March–April 2002.
- Hardt, Michael. (2007). "Jefferson and Democracy". American Quarterly. 59 (1): 41–78. doi:10.1353/aq.2007.0026. S2CID 145786386.
- "Two Faces of Apocalypse: A Letter from Copenhagen". Polygraph. 22: 265–274. 2010.
- Hardt, Michael (July 2010). "The Common in Communism". Rethinking Marxism. 22 (3): 346–356. doi:10.1080/08935696.2010.490365. hdl:10593/11443. S2CID 54968674.
- Hardt, M. (Winter 2011). "The Militancy of Theory". South Atlantic Quarterly. 110 (1): 19–35. doi:10.1215/00382876-2010-020.
- Hardt, M. (April 2012). "Falsify the Currency!". South Atlantic Quarterly. 111 (2): 359–379. doi:10.1215/00382876-1548257.
- Hardt, M. (2013). "How to Write with Four Hands". Genre. 46 (2): 175–182. doi:10.1215/00166928-2088007.
- Hardt, M. (September 2015). "The Power to Be Affected". International Journal of Politics, Culture, and Society. 28 (3): 215–222. doi:10.1007/s10767-014-9191-x. S2CID 143992813.
- “A Global War Regime”, with Sandro Mezzadra, Side Car, New Left Review, 09 May 2024.

== Film appearances ==
- Antonio Negri: A Revolt that Never Ends, ZDF/Arte, 52 min., 2004.
- Examined Life, Sphinx Productions, 87 min., 2008.
- Marx Reloaded, Arte, April 2011.
- every day words disappear, Johan Grimonprez, Zap-O-Matik, 15 min., 2016.

== Works cited ==
- Hardt, Michael, Caleb Smith, and Enrico Minardi. "The Collaborator and the Multitude: An Interview with Michael Hardt." The Minnesota Review 61-62 (Spring/Summer 2004). 63–77.
- Hardt, Michael. "How to Write With Four Hands." Genre 46.2 (2013). 175–182.
- Vulliamy, Ed. "Empire hits back". The Guardian, Sunday 15 July 2001.
- Žižek, Slavoj (September 2001). "Have Michael Hardt and Antonio Negri rewritten the Communist Manifesto for the twenty-first century?". Rethinking Marxism. 13 (3–4): 190–198. doi:10.1080/089356901101241875. S2CID 140777766. Full text.
