= Antonio Negri =

Italian political philosopher (1933–2023)

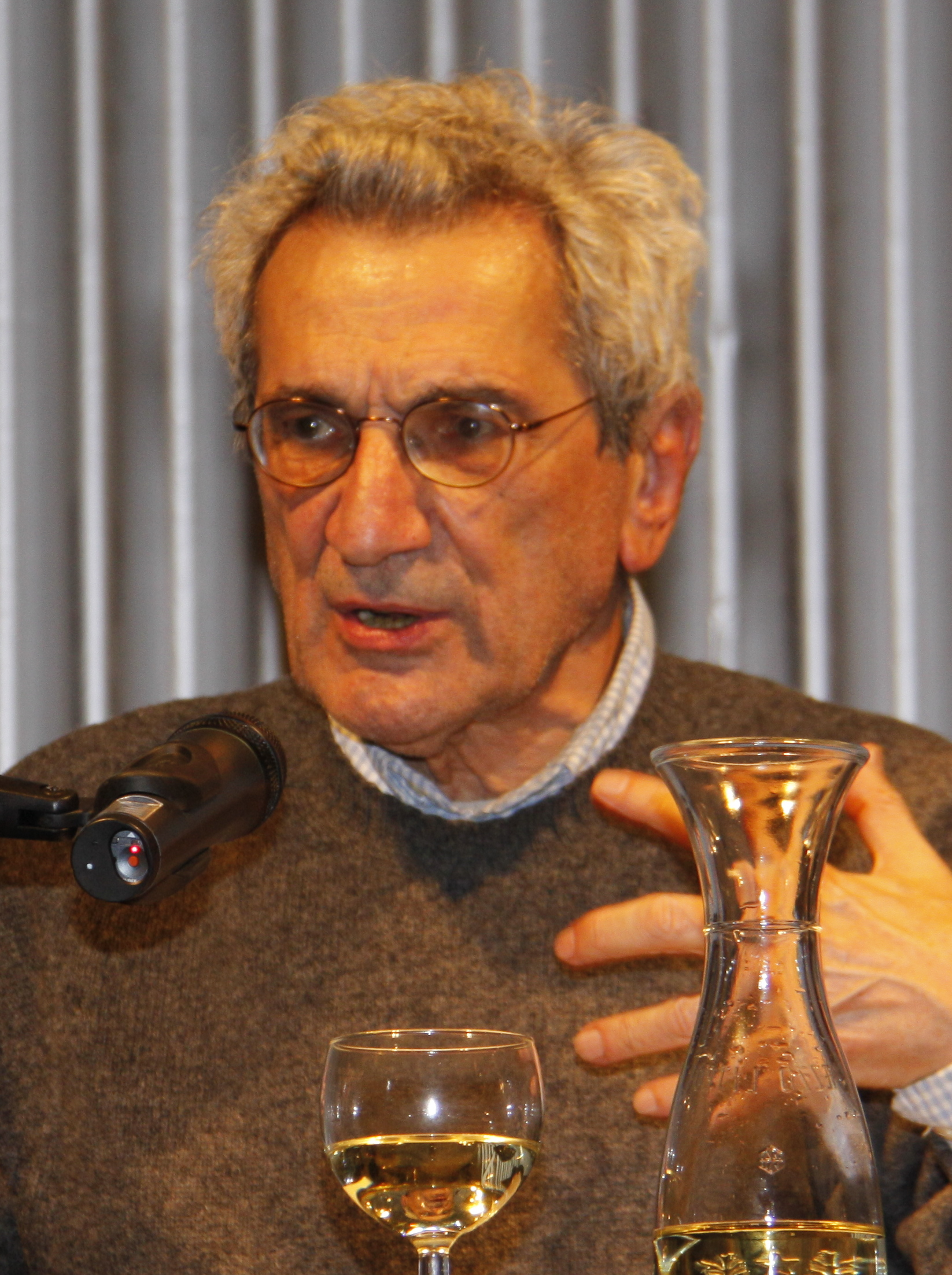
- Negri in 2009
- Born: 1 August 1933; Padua, Kingdom of Italy
- Died: 16 December 2023 (aged 90); Paris, France

Education
- Education: University of Padua; Istituto italiano per gli studi storici
- Academic advisor: Umberto Antonio Padovani

Philosophical work
- Era: Contemporary philosophy
- Region: Western philosophy
- School: Continental philosophy; Autonomist Marxism
- Institutions: University of Padua; University of Paris VIII; University of Paris VII; École Normale Supérieure; CIPh
- Main interests: Political philosophy; class conflict; globalization; commons; biopolitics
- Notable ideas: Philosophy of globalization; multitude; theory of Empire; constituent power; immaterial labour; post-Fordism; altermodernity; refusal of work

Member of the Chamber of Deputies
- In office 12 July 1983 – 1 July 1987
- Constituency: Milan–Pavia

Personal details
- Party: PSI (1956–1963); Potere Operaio (1967–1973); Autonomia Operaia (1976–1978); PR (1983–1987)

Antonio Negri (/ˈnɛɡri/; Italian: [ˈneːɡri]; 1 August 1933 – 16 December 2023) was an Italian political philosopher known as one of the most prominent theorists of autonomism, as well as for his co-authorship of Empire with Michael Hardt. Born in Padua, Italy, Negri became a professor of political philosophy at the University of Padua, where he taught state and constitutional theory. Negri founded the Potere Operaio (Worker Power) group in 1969 and was a leading member of Autonomia Operaia, and published highly influential books, including Empire and Multitude: War and Democracy in the Age of Empire.

Negri was accused in the late 1970s of being the mastermind of the left-wing urban guerrilla organization Red Brigades (Brigate Rosse or BR), which was involved in the May 1978 kidnapping and murder of former Italian prime minister Aldo Moro. On 7 April 1979, Negri was arrested and charged with a number of crimes, including the Moro murder. Most charges were quickly dropped, but in 1984, having fled to France, he was sentenced in absentia to 30 years in prison. He was given an additional four years on the charge of being morally responsible for the violence of political activists in the 1960s and 1970s. The question of Negri's involvement with left-wing extremism is a controversial subject. He was indicted on a number of charges, including "association and insurrection against the state" (a charge which was later dropped), and sentenced for involvement in two murders.

Negri fled to France where, protected by the Mitterrand doctrine, he taught at the Paris VIII (Vincennes) and the Collège international de philosophie (CIPh), along with Jacques Derrida, Michel Foucault, and Gilles Deleuze. In 1997, after a plea-bargain that reduced his prison time from 30 to 13 years, he returned to Italy to serve the end of his sentence. Many of his most influential books were published while he was behind bars. After his release he lived in Venice and Paris with his partner, the French philosopher Judith Revel. He was the father of film director Anna Negri.

== Early years ==
Antonio Negri was born in Padua, in the Northeastern Italian region of Veneto, in 1933. His father was an active communist militant from the city of Bologna (in the Northeastern Italian region of Emilia-Romagna), and although he died when Negri was two years old, his political engagement made Negri familiar with Marxism from an early age, while his mother was a teacher from the town of Poggio Rusco (in the province of Mantua, Lombardy). He began his career as a militant in the 1950s with the activist Roman Catholic youth organization Gioventù Italiana di Azione Cattolica (GIAC). Negri became a communist in 1955 when working at the Nahsonim kibbutz in central Israel. The kibbutz was organised according to ideas of Zionist socialism and its the members were Jewish communists. He joined the Italian Socialist Party in 1956 and remained a member until 1963, while at the same time becoming more and more engaged throughout the late 1950s and early 1960s in Marxist movements.

Negri studied philosophy and was hired as a professor at the University of Padua, soon after receiving his doctorate in 1956. There, he taught dottrina dello Stato ("state doctrine"), an Italian field similar to the philosophy of law, covering state and constitutional theory. In the early 1960s, Negri joined the editorial group of Quaderni Rossi, a journal that represented the intellectual rebirth of Marxism in Italy outside the realm of the Italian Communist Party. Negri was part of the group that left Quaderni Rossi in 1964 to found Classe Operaia, and he contributed to the journal as a writer and editor. In 1969, together with Oreste Scalzone and Franco Piperno, Negri was one of the founders of the group Potere Operaio (Workers' Power) and the operaismo (lit. 'workerism') movement.

== Arrest and flight ==
On 16 March 1978, Aldo Moro, the party leader of Christian Democracy and the former Italian prime minister, was kidnapped in Rome by the Red Brigades. Forty-five days after the kidnapping and nine days before Moro's death, the Red Brigades called his family and informed Moro's wife of his impending death. The conversation was recorded and later broadcast. While a number of people who knew Negri at the time identified him as the probable author of the call, the caller was later revealed to be Valerio Morucci.

On 7 April 1979, Negri and other activists were charged with kidnapping, assassination and insurrection. Padua's Public Prosecutor Pietro Calogero accused them of being involved in the political wing of the Red Brigades, and thus behind left-wing terrorism in Italy. Negri was charged with a number of offences, including leadership of the Red Brigades, masterminding the 1978 kidnapping and murder of the President of the Christian Democratic Party, Aldo Moro, and plotting to overthrow the government. At the time, Negri was a political science professor at the University of Padua and visiting lecturer at Paris' École Normale Supérieure. The Italian public was shocked that an academic could be involved in such events.

A year later, a leader of the BR, having decided to cooperate with the prosecution, testified that Negri "had nothing to do with the Red Brigades." The charge of 'armed insurrection against the State' against Negri was dropped and he consequently did not receive the 30-year plus life sentence requested by the prosecutor, but did receive 30 years for being the instigator of political activist Carlo Saronio's murder and having 'morally concurred' with the murder of Andrea Lombardini, a carabiniere, during a failed bank robbery.

Some of his peers found little fault with Negri's activities. Michel Foucault commented, "Isn't he in jail simply for being an intellectual?" French philosophers Félix Guattari and Gilles Deleuze also signed in November 1977 L'Appel des intellectuels français contre la répression en Italie (The Call of French Intellectuals Against Repression in Italy) in protest against Negri's imprisonment and Italian anti-terrorism legislation. On the other hand, in the late 1980s Italian President Francesco Cossiga described Antonio Negri as "a psychopath" who "poisoned the minds of an entire generation of Italy's youth."

In 1983, four years after his arrest and while he was still in prison awaiting trial, Negri was elected to the Italian legislature as a member for the Radical Party. He was freed from prison claiming parliamentary immunity and was released, fleeing to France with the help of Félix Guattari and Amnesty International. His release was later revoked when the Chamber of Deputies voted to strip him of his immunity. Negri remained in exile in France for the next 14 years, where he was protected from extradition by the Mitterrand doctrine.

In France, Negri began teaching at the Paris VIII (Vincennes), and also at the Collège international de philosophie founded by Jacques Derrida. Although the conditions of his residence in France prevented him from engaging in political activities, he wrote prolifically and was active in a broad coalition of left-wing intellectuals. In 1997, he returned to Italy to serve out his sentence, hoping to raise awareness of the status of hundreds of other political exiles from Italy. His sentence was commuted and he was released from prison in 2003, having written some of his most influential works while behind bars.

== Political thought and writing ==
Negri was one of the central theorists of autonomist Marxism, and was a prominent philosopher within libertarian socialism, communism, and Marxism. He also wrote various works on imperialism, radical democracy, and political praxis.

=== Labor of Dionysus: A Critique of the State-Form (1994) ===
Written together with Michael Hardt, the authors ask themselves in this book, "How is it, then, that labour, with all its life-affirming potential, has become the means of capitalist discipline, exploitation, and domination in modern society?" The authors expose and pursue this paradox through a systematic analysis of the role of labour in the processes of capitalist production and in the establishment of capitalist legal and social institutions. Critiquing liberal and socialist notions of labour and institutional reform from a radical democratic perspective, Hardt and Negri challenge the state-form itself.

=== Insurgencies: Constituent Power and the Modern State (1999) ===
This book, written solely by Negri, "explores the drama of modern revolutions-from Machiavelli's Florence and Harrington's England to the American, French, and Russian revolutions-and puts forward a new notion of how power and action must be understood if we are to achieve a radically democratic future."

=== Empire (2000) ===
In general, the book theorises an ongoing transition from a "modern" phenomenon of imperialism, centred around individual nation-states, to an emergent postmodern construct created among ruling powers which the authors call "Empire", with different forms of warfare:

According to Hardt and Negri's Empire, the rise of Empire is the end of national conflict, the "enemy" now, whoever he is, can no longer be ideological or national. The enemy now must be understood as a kind of criminal, as someone who represents a threat not to a political system or a nation but to the law. This is the enemy as a terrorist ... In the "new order that envelops the entire space of ... civilization", where conflict between nations has been made irrelevant, the "enemy" is simultaneously "banalized" (reduced to an object of routine police repression) and absolutized (like the Enemy, an absolute threat to the ethical order").

Empire elaborates a variety of ideas surrounding constitutions, global war, and class. Hence, the Empire is constituted by a monarchy (the United States and the G8, and international organizations such as NATO, the International Monetary Fund or the World Trade Organization), an oligarchy (the multinational corporations and other nation-states) and a democracy (the various non-government organizations and the United Nations). Part of the book's analysis deals with "imagin[ing] resistance", but "the point of Empire is that it, too, is "total" and that resistance to it can only take the form of negation – "the will to be against". The Empire is total, but economic inequality persists, and as all identities are wiped out and replaced with a universal one, the identity of the poor persists.

=== Multitude: War and Democracy in the Age of Empire (2004) ===
Multitude addresses these issues and picks up the thread where Empire leaves off. In order to do so, Hardt and Negri argue, one must first analyse the present configuration of war and its contradictions. This analysis is performed in the first chapter, after which chapters two and three focus on multitude and democracy, respectively. Multitude is not so much a sequel as it is a reiteration from a new point of view in a new, relatively accessible style that is distinct from the predominantly academic prose style of Empire. Multitude remains, the authors insist, despite its ubiquitous subject matter and its almost casual tone, a book of philosophy which aims to shape a conceptual ground for a political process of democratisation rather than present an answer to the question 'what to do?' or offer a programme for concrete action.

=== Commonwealth (2009) ===
In 2009 Negri completed the book Commonwealth, the final in a trilogy that began in 2000 with Empire and continued with Multitude in 2004, co-authored with Michael Hardt.

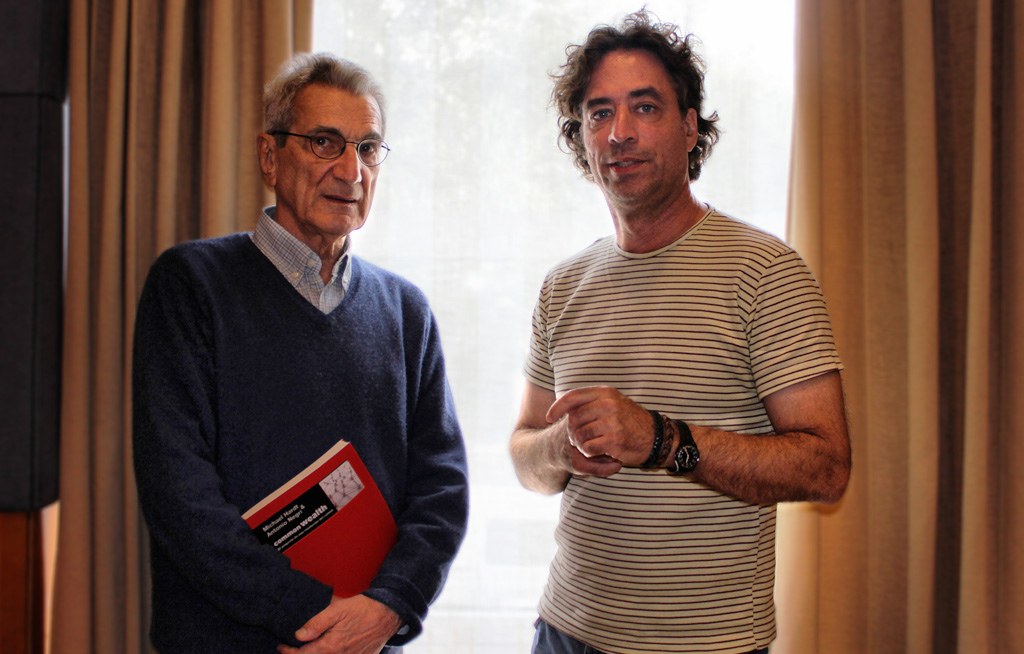
Antonio Negri holding a copy of Commonwealth, with co-author Michael Hardt

In this book, the authors introduce the concept of "the republic of property": "What is central for our purposes here is that the concept of property and the defence of property remain the foundation of every modern political constitution. This is the sense in which the republic, from the great bourgeois revolutions to today, is a republic of property". Part 2 of the book deals with the relationship between modernity and anti-modernity and proposes altermodernity. Altermodernity "involves not only insertion in the long history of antimodern struggles but also rupture with any fixed dialectic between modern sovereignty and antimodern resistance. In the passage from antimodernity to altermodernity, just as tradition and identity are transformed, so too resistance takes on a new meaning, dedicated now to the constitution of alternatives. The freedom that forms the base of resistance, as we explained earlier, comes to the fore and constitutes an event to announce a new political project."

For Alex Callinicos in a review "What is newest in Commonwealth is its take on the fashionable idea of the common. Hardt and Negri mean by this not merely the natural resources that capital seeks to appropriate, but also "the languages we create, the social practices we establish, the modes of sociality that define our relationships", which are both the means and the result of biopolitical production. Communism, they argue, is defined by the common, just as capitalism is by the private and socialism (which they identify in effect with statism) with the public." For David Harvey Negri and Hardt "in the search of an altermodernity – something that is outside the dialectical opposition between modernity and anti-modernity – they need a means of escape. The choice between capitalism and socialism, they suggest, is all wrong. We need to identify something entirely different, communism – working within a different set of dimensions." Harvey also notes that "Revolutionary thought, Hardt and Negri argue, must find a way to contest capitalism and 'the republic of property.' It 'should not shun identity politics but instead must work through it and learn from it,' because it is the 'primary vehicle for struggle within and against the republic of property since identity itself is based on property and sovereignty.'" In the same exchange in Artforum between Harvey and Micheal Hardt and Antonio Negri, Hardt and Negri attempt to correct Harvey in a concept that is important within the argument of Commonwealth. As such, they state that "We instead define the concept of singularity, contrasting it to the figure of the individual on the one hand and forms of identity on the other, by focusing on three aspects of its relationship to multiplicity: Singularity refers externally to a multiplicity of others; is internally divided or multiple; and constitutes a multiplicity over time – that is, a process of becoming."

After Commonwealth, he wrote multiple notable articles on the Arab Spring and Occupy movements, along with other social issues.

=== Occupy movements of 2011–2012 and Declaration ===
In May 2012, Negri self-published (with Michael Hardt) an electronic pamphlet on the occupy and encampment movements of 2011–2012 called Declaration that argues the movement explores new forms of democracy. The introduction was published at Jacobin under the title "Take Up the Baton". He also published an article with Hardt in Foreign Affairs in October 2011 stating "The Encampment in Lower Manhattan Speaks to a Failure of Representation."

=== Assembly and essay collections (2013–2023) ===
In 2013, Negri published Spinoza: Politics and Postmodernity, a collections of essays on Spinoza and his contemporary relevance to philosophy and political theory, translated into English by William McCuaig.

In 2017, Negri and Michael Hardt published Assembly. The book provides a series of reflections on the nature of contemporary capitalism and social movements, drawing together the concepts and ideas explored previously in their Empire 'trilogy' such as the common, the multitude, and globalisation. It also introduces a new political concept of 'assembly', which draws on Gilles Deleuze and Félix Guattari's concept of an 'assemblage' (French: agencements) as a way of thinking about mass movements and the role of constituent power. It also provides analyses of events that occurred in the years since Commonwealth was published in 2009, such as the rise of right-wing populism, Occupy Wall Street, the automation of work, and the digital economy. It continues their reflections on the character and goals of leaderless movements, and especially focuses on the ways in which these movements can seek to self-organise in radically democratic and egalitarian ways. They propose that instead of the usual model of leadership and movement in which leadership serves to articulate the long-term and 'large scale' programme of the multitude, this relationship should instead be inverted: leadership instead comes to serve specific, tactical, and short-term ends (such as the organisation of specific moblisations, protests, direct action, strikes, etc.), while the multitude (or collective) serves to "articulate the long-term goals and objectives" to which the leadership must submit and facilitate.

The book received generally positive reviews. Writing for Critical Inquiry, Kyle Perry argues that the central claim of the book is that "advocates for a truly democratic world must no longer refuse the demands of leading, strategizing, decision making, and institution building that can otherwise remain variously secondary, absent, or anathema amid left, liberatory, and progressive causes." It also rejects as a false binary the idea that liberal-democratic institutions should either be occupied or destroyed; instead, "The better move is to get creative about inventing new, effective, and crucially 'nonsovereign' institutions. Such institutions are not meant to 'rule over us' but to 'foster continuity and organization" and to "help organize our practices, manage our relationships, and together make decisions'." Writing for the Los Angeles Review of Books, Terence Renaud argues that "Given how much the political terrain has changed since Empire appeared in 2000, much of Hardt and Negri's project appears dead. It has said all that it's going to say. Even so, the authors do an excellent job of highlighting the internal challenges that a resurgent left will face. Every new left risks degenerating into sectarian conflict, heavy-handed leadership, and complacency about its own righteousness. Hardt and Negri insist on a self-critical and internally democratic left that never ceases to call its own assumptions into question. In order to transform society, the left must first transform itself."

Between 2016 and 2019, Negri published a three-volume collection of essays written in various years, but translated, collected and published together in English in these volumes. The first volume was titled Marx and Foucault, and published on 16 December 2016. In this first volume, Negri aims to show "how the thinking of Marx and Foucault were brought together to create an original theoretical synthesis – particularly in the context of Italy from May '68 onwards." The second volume was titled From the Factory to the Metropolis, and was published in February 2018. This second volume turns towards an analysis of the passage from the traditional proletarian 'mass worker' of industrial capitalism (especially as found in Marx's writing) to the contemporary 'socialised worker', as well as of the modern 'metropolis', which Negri describes as "a space of antagonisms between forms of life produced, on the one hand, by finance capital (the capital that operates around rents), and on the other by the 'cognitive proletariat'. The central question is then how 'the common' of the latter can be mobilised for the destruction of capitalism." The third and final volume of this 'trilogy' was titled Spinoza: Then and Now, which was published in February 2020. In this third volume, Negri "examines how Spinoza's thought constitutes a radical break with past ideas and an essential tool for envisaging a form of politics beyond capitalism."

On 29 October 2021, Negri published the first volume of a new trilogy of books. This first volume is titled Marx in Movement: Operaismo in Context, and seeks to provide an account and examination of the history of Italian Autonomist (or 'Autonomist Marxist') thought, particularly in terms of Negri's theoretical development of the concept of the 'social worker' as an attempt to update Marxism in light of the changes since the factory-based industrial labour of Marx's time.

== Personal life and death ==
Negri married Paola Meo in 1962. They had two children (Anna and Francesco) and later divorced. He has another daughter, Nina Negri, from a separate relationship. He met the philosopher Judith Revel in 1996; they married in 2016.

Negri died in Paris on 16 December 2023, at the age of 90.

== Electoral history ==
Election	House	Constituency	Party	Votes	Result
1983	Chamber of Deputies	Milan–Pavia	PR	13,521	Elected

== Bibliography ==
Listed in order of their first publication in English.

- Antonio Negri, Revolution Retrieved: Selected Writings on Marx, Keynes, Capitalist Crisis and New Social Subjects, 1967–83. Translated by Ed Emery and John Merrington. London: Red Notes, 1988. ISBN 0-906305-09-8
- Antonio Negri, The Politics of Subversion: A Manifesto for the Twenty-First Century. Cambridge: Polity Press, 1989.
- Félix Guattari and Antonio Negri, Communists Like Us. Cambridge, Mass.: Semiotext(e) Press, 1990. ISBN 0936756217
- Antonio Negri, The Savage Anomaly: The Power of Spinoza's Metaphysics and Politics. Translated by Michael Hardt. Minneapolis: University of Minnesota Press, 1991. ISBN 0816618771
- Antonio Negri, Marx Beyond Marx: Lessons on the Grundrisse. New York: Autonomedia, 1991. ISBN 093675625X
- Antonio Negri, Insurgencies: Constituent Power and the Modern State. Translated by Maurizia Boscagli. Minneapolis: University of Minnesota Press, 1999. Reprint by University of Minnesota Press, 2009.
- Antonio Negri, Time for Revolution. Translated by Matteo Mandarini. New York: Continuum, 2003. ISBN 9780826473288
- Antonio Negri, Negri on Negri: In Conversation with Anne Dufourmentelle. London: Routledge, 2004.
- Antonio Negri, Subversive Spinoza: (Un)Contemporary Variations. Edited by Timothy S. Murphy, translated by Timothy S. Murphy, Michael Hardt, Ted Stolze, and Charles T. Wolfe. Manchester: Manchester University Press, 2004.
- Antonio Negri, Books for Burning: Between Civil War and Democracy in 1970s Italy. Edited by Timothy S. Murphy, translated by Arianna Bove, Ed Emery, Timothy S. Murphy, and Francesca Novello. London and New York: Verso, 2005.
- Antonio Negri, Political Descartes: Reason, Ideology and the Bourgeois Project. Translated by Matteo Mandarini and Alberto Toscano. New York: Verso, 2007.
- Goodbye Mr. Socialism Antonio Negri in conversation with Raf Valvola Scelsi, Seven Stories Press, 2008.
- The Cell (DVD of 3 interviews on captivity with Negri) Angela Melitopoulos, Actar, 2008.
- Antonio Negri, The Porcelain Workshop: For a New Grammar of Politics Translated by Noura Wedell. California: Semiotext(e) 2008.
- Antonio Negri, Reflections on Empire. Translated by Ed Emery. Cambridge: Polity Press, 2008. ISBN 9780745637051
- Antonio Negri, Empire and Beyond. Translated by Ed Emery. Cambridge: Polity Press, 2008. ISBN 9780745640488
- Antonio Negri, The Labor of Job: The Biblical Text as a Parable of Human Labor. Translated by Matteo Mandarini. Durham: Duke University Press 2009 (begun 1983).
- Cesare Casarino and Antonio Negri, In Praise of the Common. Minneapolis: University of Minnesota Press, 2009.
- Antonio Negri, Diary of an Escape. Translated by Ed Emery. Cambridge: Polity Press, 2009. ISBN 9780745644257
- Antonio Negri, Art and Multitude. Translated by Ed Emery. Cambridge: Polity Press, 2011. ISBN 9780745648996
- Antonio Negri, The Winter is Over: Writings on Transformation Denied, 1989–1995. Edited by Giuseppe Caccia. Translated by Isabelli Bertoletti, James Cascaito, and Andrea Casson. Cambridge, Mass.: Semiotext(e), 2013. ISBN 1584351217
- Antonio Negri, Pipeline: Letters from Prison. Translated by Ed Emery. Cambridge: Polity Press, 2014. ISBN 0745655645
- Antonio Negri, Factory of Strategy: 33 Lessons on Lenin. New York: Columbia University Press, 2014. ISBN 0231146833
- Antonio Negri, Marx and Foucault. Cambridge: Polity Press, 2016. ISBN 9781509503407
- Antonio Negri, From the Factory to the Metropolis. Translated by Ed Emery. Cambridge: Polity Press, 2018. ISBN 9781509503452
- Antonio Negri, Spinoza: Then and Now. Translated by Ed Emery. Cambridge: Polity Press, 2020. ISBN 150950351X
- Antonio Negri, Marx in Movement: Operaismo in Context. Translated by Ed Emery. Cambridge: Polity Press, 2021. ISBN 9781509544233
- Antonio Negri, The End of Sovereignty. Translated by Ed Emery. Cambridge: Polity Press, 2022. ISBN 1509544305
- Antonio Negri, Story of a communist: A memoir. Edited by Girolamo De Michele. Translated by Ed Emery. London: Erin, 2024. ISBN 9781912475377

=== In collaboration with Michael Hardt ===
- Michael Hardt and Antonio Negri, Labor of Dionysus: A Critique of the State-Form. Minneapolis: University of Minnesota Press, 1994. ISBN 0816620865
- Michael Hardt and Antonio Negri, Empire. Cambridge, Mass.: Harvard University Press, 2000. ISBN 0674006712
- Michael Hardt and Antonio Negri, Multitude: War and Democracy in the Age of Empire, New York: Penguin Press, 2004. ISBN 0143035592
- Michael Hardt and Antonio Negri, Commonwealth, Belknap Press of Harvard University Press, 2009. ISBN 978-0-674-03511-9
- Michael Hardt and Antonio Negri, Declaration, 2012.
- Michael Hardt and Antonio Negri, Assembly. Translated by Ed Emery. Oxford: Oxford University Press, 2018. ISBN 9780190677961

=== Online articles ===
- Multitudes quarterly journal (in French)
- Archives of the journal Futur Antérieur (in French)
- English translations of recent articles by Antonio Negri from Generation Online
- Hardt & Negri (2002), "Marx's Mole is Dead" in Eurozine
- Between "Historic Compromise" and Terrorism: Reviewing the experience of Italy in the 1970s Le Monde Diplomatique, August–September 1998
- "Towards an Ontological Definition of Multitude" Article published in the French journal Multitudes.
- Extract from Negri and Hardt's Empire at Marxists.org
- "Take Up the Baton."

=== Interviews ===
Transcendence, Spirituality, Practices, Immanence: A Conversation with Antonio Negri by Judith Revel, Rethinking Marxism, 28(3–4), 470–478, (2016). doi:10.1080/08935696.2016.1243627

- From Sociological to Ontological Inquiry: An Interview with Antonio Negri by Max Henninger, Italian Culture, Volume 23, 2005, pp. 153–166 (Article) Published by Michigan State University Press DOI: https://doi.org/10.1353/itc.2006.0013
- Workerist Marxism: Interview with Antonio Negri, Crisis and Critique, Vol2, Issue2.
- Antonio Negri and Danilo Zolo, Empire and the multitude: A dialogue on the new order of globalization, Radical Philosophy 120, Jul/Aug 2003.
- “The Revolution Will Not Be an Explosion Somewhere Down the Road”: An Interview with Antonio Negri, Grey Room (2010) (41): 6–23, MIT Press. https://doi.org/10.1162/GREY_a_00010
- The Paris Commune: Antonio Negri, by Niccolò Cuppini, as part of the Planetary Commune project, Autonomies, 8 April 2021.

== Films ==
- Marx Reloaded, Arte, April 2011.
- Antonio Negri: A Revolt that Never Ends, ZDF/Arte, 52 min., 2004.

== See also ==
- Giorgio Agamben
- Paolo Virno
