= Multitude: War and Democracy in the Age of Empire =

Book by Antonio Negri and Michael Hardt

- Author: Michael Hardt and Antonio Negri
- Language: English
- Subject: Political science Marxism; Globalization; Philosophy; Postmodernism
- Publisher: Penguin Books
- Publication date: 2004
- Publication place: United States
- Media type: Print (hardcover & paperback)
- Pages: 448 pp.
- ISBN: 1-59420-024-6
- OCLC: 54487542
- Dewey Decimal: 321.8 22
- LC Class: JC423 .H364 2004
- Preceded by: Empire
- Followed by: Commonwealth

Multitude: War and Democracy in the Age of Empire is a book by autonomous Marxist philosophers Antonio Negri and Michael Hardt that was published in 2004. It is the second installment of a "trilogy", also comprising Empire (2000) and Commonwealth (2009).

== Summary ==
Multitude is divided into three sections: "War," which addresses the current "global civil war"; "Multitude," which elucidates the "multitude" as an "active social subject, which acts on the basis of what the singularities share in common"; and, "Democracy," which critiques traditional forms of political representation and gestures toward alternatives.

Multitude addresses these issues and elaborates on the assertion, in the Preface to Empire, that:

"The creative forces of the multitude that sustain Empire are also capable of autonomously constructing a counter-Empire, an alternative political organization of global flows and exchanges."
