= Empire (Hardt and Negri book) =

Book by Antonio Negri and Michael Hardt

- Cover of the first edition
- Authors: Michael Hardt; Antonio Negri
- Language: English
- Subjects: Globalization; International relations
- Publisher: Harvard University Press
- Publication date: 2000
- Publication place: United States
- Media type: Print (hardcover and paperback)
- Pages: 478
- ISBN: 0-674-25121-0 (hardcover) ISBN 0-674-00671-2 (paperback)
- OCLC: 41967081
- Dewey Decimal: 325/.32/09045 21
- LC Class: JC359.H279 2000
- Preceded by: Labor of Dionysus: A Critique of the State-Form
- Followed by: Multitude: War and Democracy in the Age of Empire

Empire is a book by autonomist philosophers Michael Hardt and Antonio Negri. Written in the mid-1990s, it was published in 2000 and quickly sold beyond its expectations as an academic work.

It is part of a trilogy which includes Multitude: War and Democracy in the Age of Empire (2004) and Commonwealth (2009).

== Summary ==
In general, Hardt and Negri theorize an ongoing transition from a "modern" phenomenon of imperialism, centered on individual nation-states, to an emergent postmodern construct created among ruling powers which the authors call "Empire" (the capital letter is distinguishing), with different forms of warfare:

... according to Hardt and Negri's Empire, the rise of Empire is the end of national conflict, the "enemy" now, whoever he is, can no longer be ideological or national. The enemy now must be understood as a kind of criminal, as someone who represents a threat not to a political system or a nation but to the law. This is the enemy as a terrorist....In the "new order that envelops the entire space of... civilization," where conflict between nations has been made irrelevant, the "enemy" is simultaneously "banalized" (reduced to an object of routine police repression) and absolutized (as the Enemy, an absolute threat to the ethical order).

Hardt and Negri elaborate a variety of ideas surrounding constitutions, global war, and class. Hence, the Empire is constituted by a monarchy (United States and G8, and international organizations such as NATO, International Monetary Fund, or World Trade Organization), an oligarchy (multinational corporations and other nation-states), and a democracy (various non-government organizations and United Nations). Part of the book's analysis deals with "imagin[ing] resistance," but "the point of Empire is that it, too, is 'total' and that resistance to it can only take the form of negation – 'the will to be against'." The Empire is total, but economic inequality persists, and as all identities are wiped out and replaced with a universal one, the identity of the poor persists.

== Influences ==
The book's description of pyramidal levels is a replica of Polybius' description of Roman government, hence the Empire denomination. Furthermore, the crisis is conceived as inherent to the Empire.

Hardt and Negri are heavily indebted to Michel Foucault's analysis of biopolitics, as well as the work of Gilles Deleuze and Félix Guattari, especially their book A Thousand Plateaus. A number of concepts developed by Deleuze and Guattari—such as multiplicity, deterritorialization, nomads, and control—are central to Empire's claims. Before Empire, Negri was best known for having written The Savage Anomaly (1981), a milestone book in Spinozism studies which he wrote in prison. Empire is thus, unsurprisingly, also influenced by Spinoza. It is also influenced by the work of Carl Schmitt, in particular his theory of sovereignty, as well as Niccolò Machiavelli.

The ideas first introduced in Empire (notably the concept of multitude, taken from Spinoza) were further developed in the books Multitude: War and Democracy in the Age of Empire (2004), Commonwealth (2009), and Assembly (2017), which were also written by Hardt and Negri.

== Reception and legacy ==
Empire has been described by the London Review of Books as "the most successful work of political theory to come from the Left for a generation." The book has been highly influential on numerous debates within the Left, and has even been called "a bible of the anti-globalisation movement" by one critic and "the most influential book in recent decades on a classic sociological theme." In a review of the book, Slavoj Žižek stated that the book "sets as its goal, writing the Communist Manifesto for the twenty-first century," although he criticised it as "pre-Marxist" in its failure to relate radical demands (such as global citizenship and guaranteed minimum income) to the "inherent antagonisms" of the capitalist process that would make their realisation possible.

Gopal Balakrishnan, reviewing the book for the New Left Review, wrote that when compared with influential conservative books such as Francis Fukuyama's The End of History and the Last Man, "[c]omparable totalizations from the Left have been few and far between; diagnoses of the present more uniformly bleak. At best, the alternative to surrender or self-delusion has seemed to be a combative but clear-eyed pessimism, orienting the mind for a Long March against the new scheme of things. In this landscape, the appearance of Empire represents a spectacular break. Michael Hardt and Antonio Negri defiantly overturn the verdict that the last two decades have been a time of punitive defeats for the Left."

Empire has created intellectual debates around its arguments. Certain scholars have compared the evolution of the world order with Hardt and Negri's world image in Empire. A number of publications and debates centered on the book, both positively and negatively. Hardt and Negri's theoretical approach has also been compared and contrasted with works of 'the global capitalism school' whose authors have analyzed transnational capitalism and class relations in the global epoch.

Hardt and Negri published an essay titled "'Empire' 20 Years On" in the November/December 2019 edition of New Left Review, in which they provide a critical analysis of the book's legacy and their perspective on it looking back.

== Publication history ==
Empire was published by Harvard University Press in 2000 as a 478-page hardcover (ISBN 0-674-25121-0) and paperback (ISBN 0-674-00671-2).

== See also ==
- Autonomous Marxism
- Anti-globalization movement
- Empire
- Tiqqun
