= Tractatus Theologico-Politicus =

1670 philosophical work by Baruch Spinoza

Tractatus Theologico-Politicus (Note: The full title tagline in Latin is: Continens Dissertationes aliquot, Quibus ostenditur Libertatem Philosophandi non tantum salva Pietate, et Reipublicae Pace posse concedi: sed eandem nisi cum Pace Reipublicae, ipsaque Pietate tolli non posse. Which in English would mean: Containing several dissertations, without prejudice to the freedom of the Philosophers or to Piety, and to the Peace conceded by the Republic; but also dealing with the Peace of the Republic itself, which without Piety cannot properly continue. To this the Latin text of 1 John 4,13 is added: Per hoc cognoscimus quod in Deo manemus, et Deus manet in nobis, quod de Spiritu suo dedit nobis. (By this we know that we dwell in God, and that God dwells in us, because he has given us of his own Spirit.))
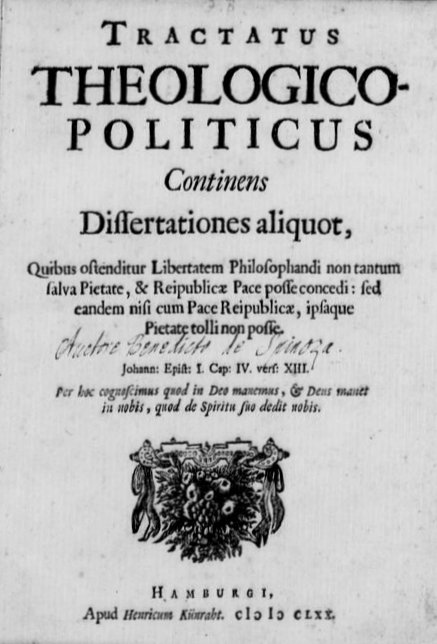
- Author: Baruch Spinoza
- Language: Latin
- Publication date: 1670
- Publication place: Dutch Republic
- Dewey Decimal: 199/.492

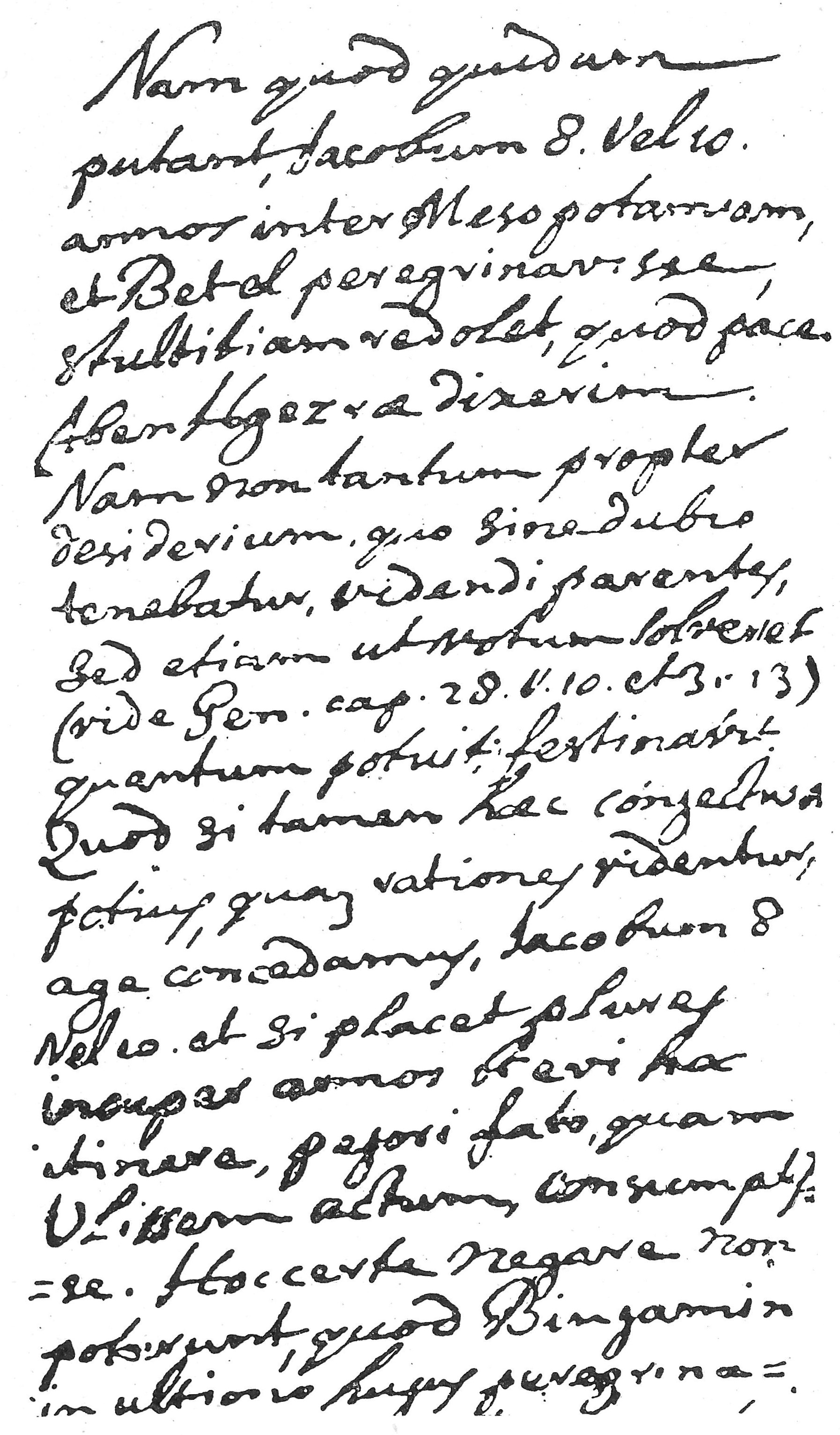
Manuscript notes by Spinoza on Tractatus Theologico-Politicus, chapter 9. Adnotatio 14. "That some people think that Jacob had travelled 8 or 10 years between Mesopotamia and Bethel, is redolent of stupidity, Ezra forgive me...".

The Tractatus Theologico-Politicus (TTP) or Theologico-Political Treatise, is a 1670 work of philosophy written in Latin by the Dutch philosopher Baruch Spinoza (1632–1677) and published anonymously. The book was one of the most important and controversial texts of the early modern period. Its aim was "to liberate the individual from bondage to superstition and ecclesiastical authority." In it, Spinoza expounds his views on contemporary Jewish and Western Christianity and critically analyses the Bible, especially the Hebrew Bible.

The work has been characterized as "one of the most significant events in European intellectual history", laying the groundwork for ideas about liberalism, secularism, and democracy. He argues what the best roles for state and religion should be and concludes that a degree of democracy and freedom of speech and religion works best, such as in Amsterdam, while the state remains paramount within reason. The goal of the state is to guarantee the freedom of citizens. Religious leaders should not interfere in politics.

Spinoza interrupted his writing of his magnum opus, the Ethics, to respond to the increasing intolerance in the Dutch Republic, directly challenging religious authorities and their power over freedom of thought. He published the work anonymously in Latin, rightly anticipating harsh criticism and vigorous attempts by religious leaders and conservative secular authorities to suppress his work entirely, he halted the publication of a Dutch translation. One anonymous critic described it as being "Forged in hell by the apostate Jew working together with the devil".

== Historical context ==
The vaunted religious tolerance of the Dutch Republic was under strain in the mid-seventeenth century. War with England over trade and imperial dominance affected the Northern Netherlands' prosperity.

The conservative leaders of the Dutch Reformed Church put pressure on civil authorities to curtail freedom of expression and the circulation of ideas to which they objected. In the political sphere conservatives sought to restore the position of stadtholder, or head of state, with a member of the House of Orange. During the First Stadtholderless Period (1650–1672) Johan de Witt functioned as head of state and was in favor of policies of religious toleration, which had helped fuel prosperity. Jews could practice their religion openly and were an integral part of the commercial sector.

There were also a great number of Christian sects that contributed to the religious and intellectual ferment of the Republic. Some dissenters began openly challenging religious authorities and religion itself, as Spinoza had done, leading to his expulsion from the Jewish community in Amsterdam in 1656.

A like-minded friend and kindred intellectual spirit, Adriaan Koerbagh (1633–1669), had published two works scathing of religion. Because they were published in Dutch rather than Latin, and therefore accessible to a much wider readership, he quickly came to the attention of religious authorities and was arrested and thrown into prison, where he quickly died. His death was a hard blow for Spinoza, whose reaction was to commence writing in 1665 what became the TTP.

Heeding the danger of writing in Dutch, Spinoza's treatise is in Latin. Unlike the dense text of the Ethics, the TTP is much more accessible and deals with religion and politics rather than metaphysics. Scholars have suggested that the text of the TTP incorporates the apologia ("defense") he had written in Spanish after his expulsion in 1656.

== Writing and publication history ==
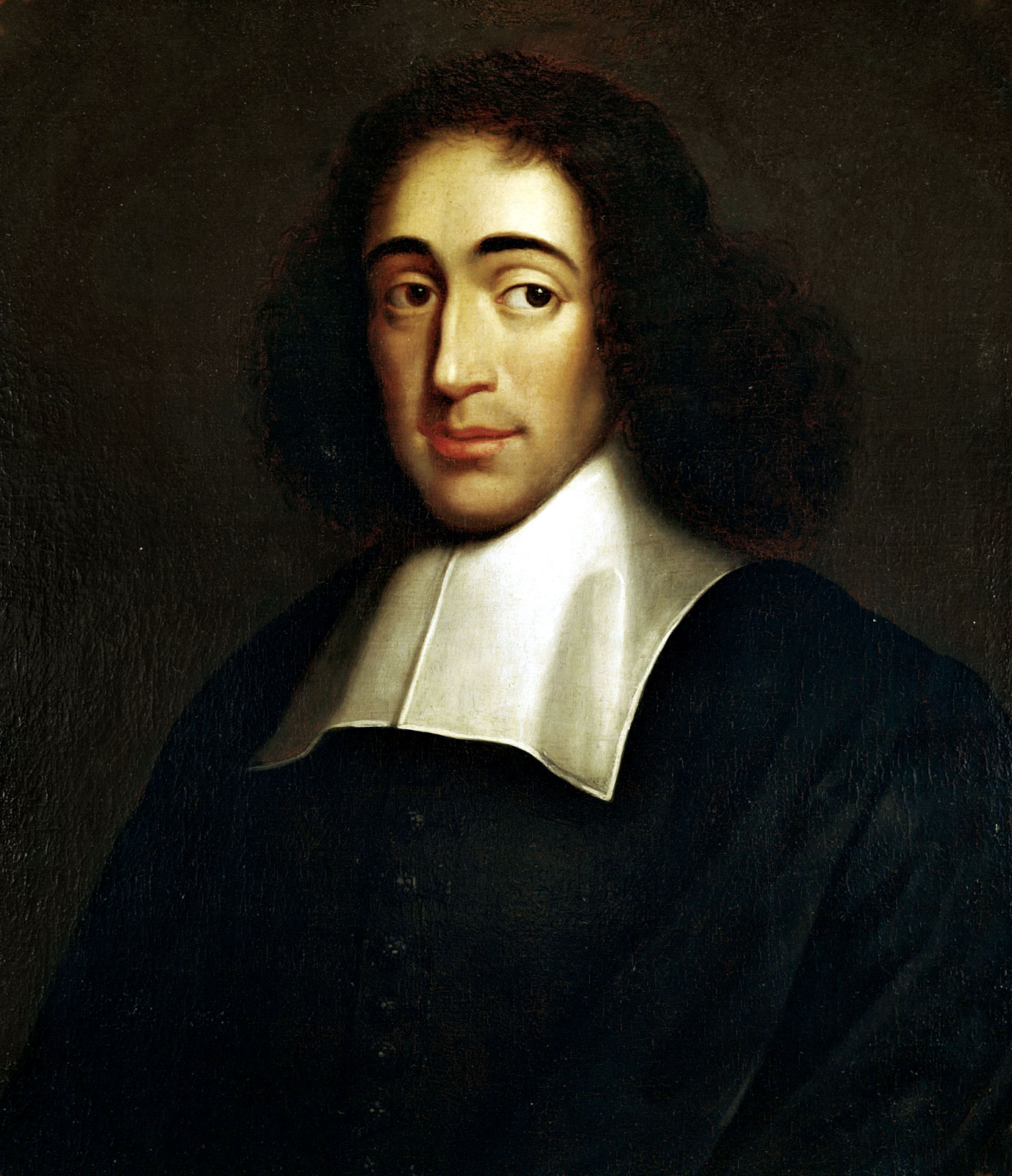
Portrait of Baruch Spinoza, 1665

Spinoza had been working on his magnum opus, the Ethics, when he put it aside to write the TTP. Unlike the abstract composition of that work as a mathematical proof, the TTP is more discursive and accessible to readers of Latin. He wrote to Henry Oldenburg, Secretary of the Royal Society, who had visited him in the Netherlands, and they continued the connection via letters, telling him about the new work. Oldenburg was surprised, and Spinoza wrote his justifications for the diversion from metaphysics. The TTP is a frontal assault on the power of theologians underpinned by scripture. Spinoza wanted to defend himself against charges of atheism. He sought the freedom to philosophize, unhindered by religious authority.

The treatise was published anonymously in 1670 by Jan Rieuwertsz. in Amsterdam. In order to protect the author and publisher from political retribution, the title page identified the city of publication as Hamburg and the publisher as Henricus Künraht (who had died in 1605). Spinoza wrote in Neo-Latin, the language of European scholars of the era. To reach beyond the scholarly readership in the Dutch Republic, publication in Dutch was the next step. Jan Hendriksz Glazemaker, Spinoza's Dutch translator and a Collegiant freethinker, prepared the edition by 1671 and sent it to the publisher; Spinoza himself intervened to prevent its printing for the moment, since the translation could have put Spinoza and his circle of supporters in increased danger with authorities.

== Structure of the work ==
Preface to Spinoza's Theological-Political Treatise, read in Latin with English subtitles

The work comprises 20 named chapters preceded by a preface. The majority of chapters deal with aspects of religion, with the last five concerning aspects of the state. The following list gives shortened chapter titles, taken from the full titles, in the 2007 edition of the TTP edited by Jonathan I. Israel.

- Preface.
- Chapter 1. On prophecy.
- Chapter 2. On the prophets.
- Chapter 3. On the vocation of the Hebrews.
- Chapter 4. On the divine law.
- Chapter 5. On ceremonies and narratives.
- Chapter 6. On miracles.
- Chapter 7. On the interpretation of Scripture.
- Chapter 8. Pentateuch, Joshua, Judges, Ruth, Samuel, Kings.
- Chapter 9. Further queries about the same books.
- Chapter 10. Remaining Old Testament books.
- Chapter 11. Apostles and prophets.
- Chapter 12. Divine law and the word of God.
- Chapter 13. The teachings of Scripture.
- Chapter 14. Faith and philosophy.
- Chapter 15. Theology and reason.
- Chapter 16. Foundations of the state.
- Chapter 17. The Hebrew state in the time of Moses.
- Chapter 18. The Hebrew state and its history.
- Chapter 19. Sovereign powers and religion.
- Chapter 20. A free state.

== Treatment of religion ==
In the treatise, Spinoza put forth his most systematic critique of Judaism, and all organized religion in general. Spinoza argued that theology and philosophy must be kept separate, particularly in the reading of scripture. Whereas he contends that the goal of theology is obedience, philosophy aims at understanding rational truth. Scripture does not teach philosophy and thus cannot be made to conform with it; otherwise, the meaning of scripture will be distorted. Conversely, if reason is made subservient to scripture, then, Spinoza argues, "the prejudices of a common people of long ago... will gain a hold on his understanding and darken it."

Spinoza held that purported supernatural occurrences—namely prophecy and miracles—have only natural explanations. He argued that God acts solely by the laws of God's own nature and rejected the view that God acts for a particular purpose or telos. For Spinoza, those who believe that God acts for some particular end are delusional, projecting their hopes and fears onto the workings of nature.

== Scriptural interpretation ==
Spinoza was not only the father of modern metaphysics, moral philosophy, and political philosophy, but also of so-called higher criticism of the Hebrew Bible. He was particularly attuned to the idea of interpretation; he felt that all organized religion was simply the institutionalized defense of particular interpretations. He rejected in its entirety the assumption of Mosaic authorship of the first five books of the Hebrew Bible, called the Pentateuch in Christianity and the Torah in Judaism. He provided an analysis of the structure of the Hebrew Bible, which demonstrated that it was essentially a compiled text with many different authors and diverse origins; in his view, it was not "revealed" all at once.

His Tractatus Theologico-Politicus undertook to show that Jewish scripture, properly understood, gave no authority for the militant intolerance of the clergy, which sought to stifle all dissent by the use of force. To achieve his objective, Spinoza had to show what a proper understanding of the Bible means, which gave him the occasion to apply criticism to the Bible. His approach stood in stark contrast to contemporaries such as John Bunyan, Manasseh ben Israel, and militant clerics. Spinoza, who permitted no supernatural rival to Nature and no rival authority to the civil government of the state, rejected also all claims that biblical texts should be treated in a manner entirely different from that in which any other document is treated that claims to be historical. His contention that the Bible "is in parts imperfect, corrupt, erroneous, and inconsistent with itself, and that we possess but fragments of it" roused a great storm at the time, and was mainly responsible for his evil repute for a century at least. Nevertheless, many have gradually adopted his views, agreeing with him that the real "word of God", or true religion, is not something written in books but "inscribed on the heart and mind of man". Many scholars and religious leaders now praise Spinoza's services in correctly interpreting scripture as a document of first-rate importance in the progressive development of human thought and conduct.

== Treatment of Judaism ==
Spinoza had been permanently excommunicated from the Jewish community in Amsterdam in 1656, having previously been raised in that community and educated in a yeshiva. After his expulsion, he never sought to return. In the TTP, he does not refer to himself as a Jew, although a number of Christians labeled him as such. He speaks only of "the Hebrews" or "the Jews" in the third person. His knowledge of Hebrew, his yeshiva studies of Jewish scripture, and his insider knowledge of how religious authorities exercised power by claiming special knowledge of sacred texts meant Judaism was a salient target for his defense of individual freedom of thought.

The treatise rejected the notion of the Jews as the chosen people. To Spinoza, all peoples were on par with each other, articulating a key element of what came to be called liberalism. God has not elevated one over the other.

Spinoza also offered a sociological explanation of how the Jewish people had survived for so long, despite facing relentless persecution. In his view, the Jews had been preserved due to a combination of gentile hatred (i.e., antisemitism) and Jewish separatism.

He also gave one final, crucial reason for the continued Jewish presence, which, in his view, was sufficient to maintain the survival of the nation forever: circumcision. It was the ultimate anthropological expression of bodily marking, a tangible symbol of separateness that was the ultimate identifier.

Spinoza also posited a novel view of the Torah; he contended that it was essentially a political constitution of the ancient state of Israel. In his view, because the state no longer existed, its constitution could no longer be valid. He argued that the Torah was thus suited to a particular time and place; because times and circumstances had changed, the Torah could no longer be regarded as a legally binding document on the Jewish people.

== Spinoza's political theory ==
Spinoza agreed with Thomas Hobbes that if each man had to fend for himself, with nothing but his own right arm to rely upon, then the life of man would be "nasty, brutish, and short". The truly human life is only possible in an organised community, that is, a state or commonwealth. The state ensures security of life, limb and property; it brings within reach of every individual many necessaries of life which he could not produce by himself; and it sets free sufficient time and energy for the higher development of human powers. Now, the existence of a state depends upon a kind of implicit agreement on the part of its members or citizens to obey the sovereign authority that governs it. In a state, no one can be allowed to do just as he pleases. Every citizen is obliged to obey the laws, and he is not free even to interpret the laws in a special manner. This looks at first like a loss of freedom on the part of the individuals and the establishment of an absolute power over them. Yet that is not really so. In the first place, without the advantages of an organised state, the average individual would be so subject to dangers and hardships of all kinds and to his own passions that he could not be called free in any real sense of the term, least of all in the sense that Spinoza used it. Man needs the state not only to save him from others but also from his own lower impulses and to enable him to live a life of reason, which alone is truly human. In the second place, state sovereignty is never really absolute. It is true that almost any kind of government is better than none, so that it is worth bearing much that is irksome rather than disturb the peace. But a reasonably wise government will even in its own interest endeavour to secure the goodwill and cooperation of its citizens by refraining from unreasonable measures, and will permit or even encourage its citizens to advocate reforms, provided they employ peaceable means. In this way, the state really rests, in the last resort, on the united will of the citizens, on what Jean-Jacques Rousseau, who read Spinoza, subsequently called the "general will".

Spinoza sometimes writes that the state ought to be accorded absolute sovereignty over its subjects. But that is due mainly to his determined opposition to every kind of ecclesiastical control over it. Though he is prepared to support what may be called a state religion, as a kind of spiritual cement, his account of this religion is such as to make it acceptable to the adherents of any one of the historic creeds, to deists, pantheists and all others, provided they are not fanatical believers or unbelievers. It is ostensibly in the interest of freedom of thought and speech that Spinoza would entrust the civil government with something approaching absolute sovereignty in order to effectively resist the tyranny of the militant churches.

=== Human power consists in strength of mind and intellect ===
One of the most striking features in Spinoza's political theory is his basic principle that "right is might." This principle he applied systematically to the whole problem of government, and seemed rather pleased with his achievement, inasmuch as it enabled him to treat political theory in a scientific spirit, as if he were dealing with applied mathematics. The identification or correlation of right with power has caused much misunderstanding. People supposed that Spinoza reduced justice to brute force. But Spinoza was very far from approving Realpolitik. In the philosophy of Spinoza, the term "power" (as should be clear from his moral philosophy) means a great deal more than physical force. In a passage near the end of his Political Treatise he states explicitly that "human power chiefly consists in strength of mind and intellect" — it consists, in fact, of all the human capacities and aptitudes, especially the highest of them. Conceived correctly, Spinoza's whole philosophy leaves ample scope for ideal motives in the life of the individual and of the community. However, Spinoza considers only men full citizens, as outlined in his unfinished Tractus Politicus, as noted by biographers Steven Nadler and Jonathan I. Israel.

=== Monarchy, Aristocracy, and Democracy ===
Spinoza discusses the principal kinds of states, or the main types of government, namely, monarchy, aristocracy, and democracy. Each has its own peculiarities and needs special safeguards, if it is to realise the primary function of a state. Monarchy may degenerate into tyranny unless it is subjected to various constitutional checks which will prevent any attempt at autocracy. Similarly, aristocracy may degenerate into an oligarchy and needs analogous checks. On the whole, Spinoza favours democracy, by which he meant any kind of representative government. In the case of democracy, the community and the government are more nearly identical than in the case of monarchy or aristocracy; consequently, a democracy is least likely to experience frequent collisions between the people and the government and so is best adapted to secure and maintain that peace.

== Reception and influence ==
It is unlikely that Spinoza's Tractatus ever had political support of any kind, with attempts being made to suppress it even before Dutch republican magistrate Johan de Witt's murder in 1672. In 1673, it was publicly condemned by the Dutch Reformed Church's Synod of Dordrecht (1673) and officially banned the following year. Harsh criticism of the TTP began to appear almost as soon as it was published. One of the first, and most notorious, critiques was by Leipzig professor Jakob Thomasius in 1670. Conversely, the British philosopher G. E. Moore suggested to Ludwig Wittgenstein that he title one of his works "Tractatus Logico-Philosophicus" as an homage to Spinoza's treatise.

== English translations ==
- 1862 by Robert Willis with introduction and notes (Trübner & Co., London). See below for the full text in Wikisource.
- 1883 by R. H. M. Elwes in the first volume of The Chief Works of Spinoza (George Bell & Sons, London).
- 1958 by A. G. Wernham in The Political Works of Spinoza, an abriged version, with introduction and notes, that includes the full text of the Tractatus Politicus (Clarendon Press, Oxford).
- 1982 by Samuel Shirley, with an introduction by B. S. Gregory (Brill, Leiden). Latter added to his translation of the Complete Works, with introduction and notes by Michael L. Morgan (Hacket Publications, 2002).
- 2007 by Jonathan Israel and Michael Silverthorne with introduction and notes also by Israel in the Cambridge Texts in History of Philosophy series.
- 2016 by Edwin Curley in the second volume of The Collected Works of Spinoza (Princeton University Press; first volume issued in 1985).

== See also ==
- Thomas Hobbes
- Moses Maimonides
- Abraham ibn Ezra
- Demythologization
- Toleration
- Tractatus Politicus
