= Tractatus Politicus =

Last treatise written by Baruch Spinoza

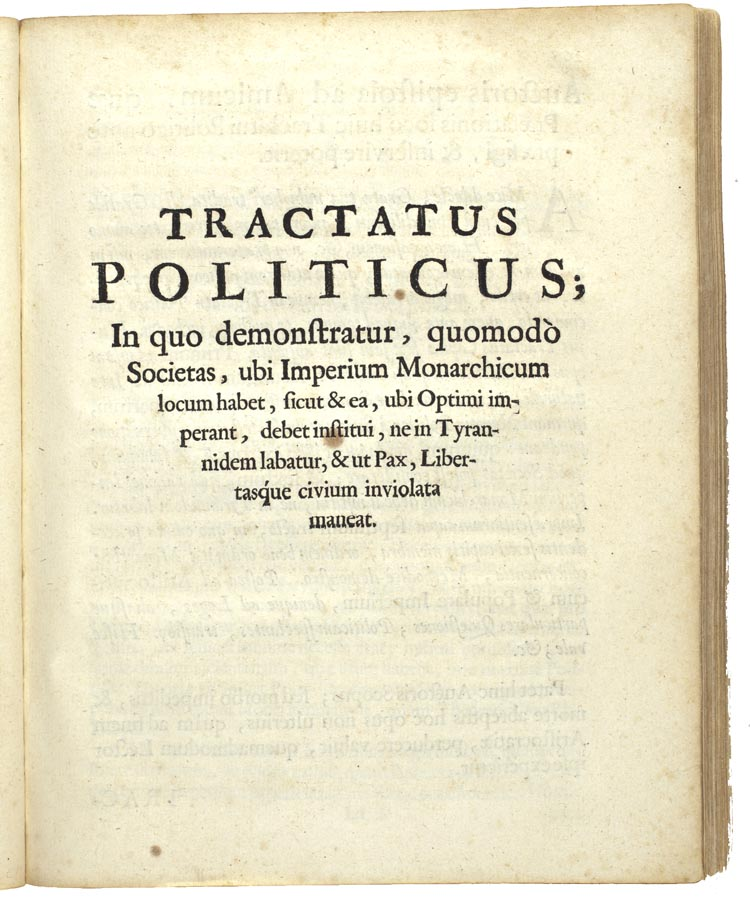
The title page of the Tractatus politicus in the Opera Posthuma.

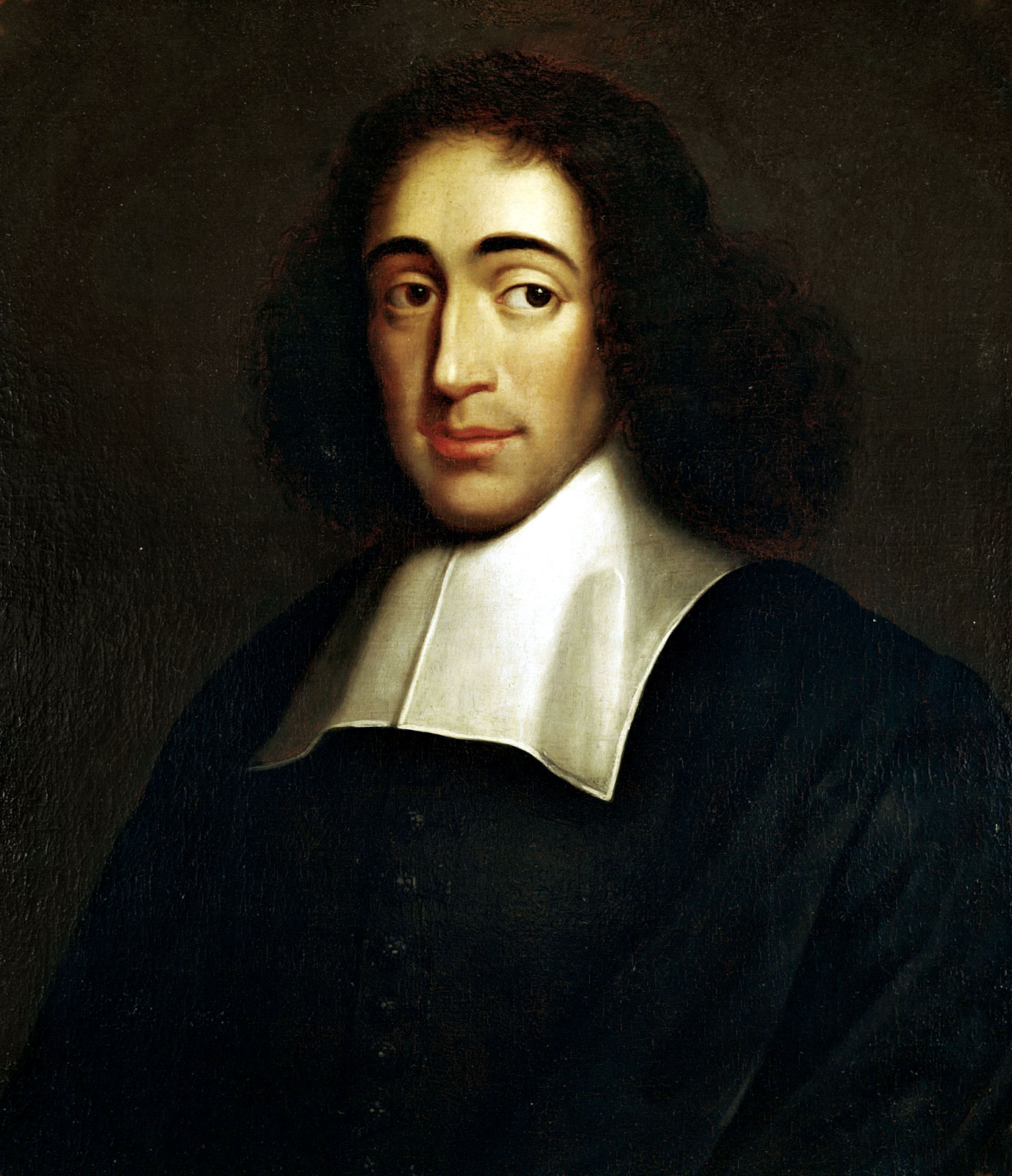
Portrait of Baruch Spinoza, 1665.

Tractatus Politicus (TP) or Political Treatise was the last and incomplete treatise written by Baruch Spinoza. It was written in 1675–77 and published posthumously in 1677. This treatise has the subtitle, "In quo demonstratur, quomodo Societas, ubi Imperium Monarchicum locum habet, sicut et ea, ubi Optimi imperant, debet institui, ne in Tyrannidem labatur, et ut Pax, Libertasque civium inviolata maneat." ("In which it is demonstrated how a society, may it be a monarchy or an aristocracy, can be best governed, so as not to fall into tyranny, and so that the peace and liberty of the citizens remain unviolated").

== Summary ==
The Political Treatise has eleven Chapters: I. Introduction, II. Of Natural law (referring to his Theologico-Political Treatise), III. Of the Right of Supreme Authorities, IV. Of the Function of Supreme Authorities, V. Of best State of Dominion, VI. to VII. Of Monarchy, VIII. to X. Of Aristocracy, XI. Of Democracy.

As in Aristotle's Politics, Spinoza analyzes each form of government: monarchy, aristocracy, and democracy without affirming which of these is the best. Unlike Aristotle, Spinoza argued in the last chapter that democracy is not "rule of majority", but freedom for all by the natural law. This unfinished work includes Spinoza's only discussion of women, whom he considered unsuitable to hold political power, at odds with his usual radical stances on other hierarchies.

The treatise also characterizes the notion of peace in Chapter V, section 4, affirming that "Peace is not mere absence of war, but is a virtue that springs from force of character." In the same Chapter, section 7 Niccolò Machiavelli is referred to as stating that the prince should establish and maintain dominion, though why Machiavelli did this is not clear, with the suggestion that Machiavelli is showing how imprudent it is to try to remove a tyrant if one is unable to remove the causes of his being a tyrant. Indeed, it has been suggested that the Political Treatise is an extended response to the authoritarian rule of William of Orange following the invasion of the Netherlands by France in 1672 and which continued as Spinoza was writing the text.

== English translations ==
- 1883 by R. H. M. Elwes in the first volume of The Chief Works of Benedict de Spinoza (George Bell & Sons, London).
- 1958 by A. G. Wernham in The Political Works of Spinoza, with introduction and notes; also includes an abridged version of the Tractatus Theologico-Politicus (Clarendon Press, Oxford).
- 2000 by Samuel Shirley, with introduction and notes by Steven Barbone and Lee Race, and a Prefatory essay by Douglas Den Uyl (Hacket Publications). Latter added to his translation of the Complete Works in one volume, with introduction and notes by Michael L. Morgan (also Hacket Publications, 2002).

== See also ==
- Theologico-Political Treatise
- Natural law
- Form of government
