= List of films about the Years of Lead (Italy) =

Below is an incomplete list of feature films, television films or television series which include events of the Years of Lead (Italy). This list does not include documentaries or short films.

== 1960s ==
Year	Country	Main title (alternative title)	Original title (original script)	Director	Subject
1969	Italy	His Day of Glory	La sua giornata di gloria	Edoardo Bruno	Drama
1969	Italy	The Wildcat	Il gatto selvaggio	Andrea Frezza	
1969	Italy	Mother's Heart	Cuore di mamma	Salvatore Samperi	Drama

== 1970s ==
Year	Country	Main title (alternative title)	Original title (original script)	Director	Subject
1970	Italy	Let's Have a Riot	Contestazione generale	Luigi Zampa	Comedy
1970	Italy	Investigation of a Citizen Above Suspicion	Indagine su un cittadino al di sopra di ogni sospetto	Elio Petri	Crime, drama
1972	Italy; France	Slap the Monster on Page One	Sbatti il mostro in prima pagina	Marco Bellocchio	Drama, mystery, thriller. Murder of Milena Sutter.
1972	Italy; West Germany; Monaco	Execution Squad	La polizia ringrazia	Steno	Crime, drama
1972	Italy	Chronicle of a Homicide	Imputazione di omicidio per uno studente	Mauro Bolognini	Crime, drama
1973	Italy	Life at stake	La vita in gioco	Gianfranco Mingozzi	Drama
1973	Italy	We Want the Colonels	Vogliamo i colonnelli	Mario Monicelli	Comedy. Piano Solo, Golpe Borghese.
1973	Italy; France	Dirty Weekend	Mordi e fuggi	Dino Risi	Comedy, crime, drama, thriller
1973	Italy	The Great Kidnapping	La polizia sta a guardare	Roberto Infascelli	Action, crime, thriller
1974	Italy	A normal day of violence	Un normale giorno di violenza	Giorgio Francesco Rizzini	Drama. Antonio Annarumma.
1974	Italy; France	Quick trial	Processo per direttissima	Lucio De Caro	Crime, drama. Giuseppe Pinelli, Italicus Express bombing.
1975	Italy	Killer Cop	La polizia ha le mani legate	Luciano Ercoli	Action, crime, drama. Piazza Fontana bombing.
1975	Italy	The Left Hand of the Law	La polizia interviene: ordine di uccidere	Giuseppe Rosati.	Crime, drama
1975	Italy	Silent Action	La polizia accusa: il Servizio Segreto uccide	Sergio Martino	Action, crime, drama. Golpe Borghese.
1976	Italy; France	Illustrious Corpses	Cadaveri eccellenti	Francesco Rosi	Crime, mystery, thriller
1976	Italy	San Babila-8 P.M.	San Babila ore 20: un delitto inutile	Carlo Lizzani	Crime, drama. Murder of Alberto Brasili.
1976	Italy	Caro Michele		Mario Monicelli	Comedy, drama. Based on the novel Caro Michele.
1977	Italy	An Average Little Man	Un borghese piccolo piccolo	Mario Monicelli	Comedy, crime, drama, thriller. Based on the novel Un borghese piccolo piccolo.
1977	Italy	I Am Afraid	Io ho paura	Damiano Damiani	Crime, drama, thriller
1977	Italy	Could It Happen Here?	Italia: ultimo atto?	Massimo Pirri	Action
1977	Italy	The... Beautiful Country	Il... Belpaese	Luciano Salce	Comedy, drama
1979	Italy; France; Canada	Dear Father	Caro papà	Dino Risi	Drama

== 1980s ==
Year	Country	Main title (alternative title)	Original title (original script)	Director	Subject
1980	Italy	To Love the Damned	Maledetti vi amerò	Marco Tullio Giordana	Drama
1981	Italy	The lost party	La festa perduta	Pier Giuseppe Murgia	Drama, romance
1981	Italy	Tragedy of a Ridiculous Man	La tragedia di un uomo ridicolo	Bernardo Bertolucci	Comedy, crime, drama
1981	Italy; France	Three Brothers	Tre fratelli	Francesco Rosi	Drama. Based on the novel Third Son.
1981	Italy	The Fall of the Rebel Angels	La caduta degli angeli ribelli	Marco Tullio Giordana	Drama
1982	Italy; France	Blow to the Heart	Colpire al cuore	Gianni Amelio	Drama
1984	Italy	The boy from Ebalus	Il ragazzo di Ebalus	Giuseppe Schito	Drama
1985	Italy	Secrets Secrets	Segreti segreti	Giuseppe Bertolucci	Drama
1986	Italy; France	Devil in the Flesh	Il diavolo in corpo	Marco Bellocchio	Drama, romance. Based on the novel Le Diable au corps.
1986	Italy	The Moro Affair	Il caso Moro	Giuseppe Ferrara	Crime, drama, history. Kidnapping and murder of Aldo Moro.
1987	Italy		Il grande Blek	Giuseppe Piccioni	Drama
1988	Italy	The Invisible Ones	Gli invisibili	Pasquale Squitieri	Drama. Based on the novel Gli invisibili.
1989	Italy		Roma-Paris-Barcelona	Paolo Grassini; Italo Spinelli	Drama
1989	Italy	About That Strange Girl	A proposito di quella strana ragazza	Marco Leto	Drama, mystery

== 1990s ==
Year	Country	Main title (alternative title)	Original title (original script)	Director	Subject
1990	Italy	A cold May morning	Una fredda mattina di maggio	Vittorio Sindoni	Drama
1991	United States	Year of the Gun		John Frankenheimer	Action, romance, thriller. Based on the novel Year of the Gun. Kidnapping and murder of Aldo Moro
1992	Italy; France	The End Is Known	La fine è nota La fin est connue	Cristina Comencini	Thriller. Based on the novel The End Is Known.
1993	Italy	The time of return	Il tempo del ritorno	Lucio Lunerti	Drama, thriller
1995	Italy; France	Who Killed Pasolini?	Pasolini, an Italian Crime	Marco Tullio Giordana	Crime, drama. Pier Paolo Pasolini.
1995	Italy; France	The Second Time	La seconda volta	Mimmo Calopresti	Drama. Based on the autobiography Colpo alla nuca.
1996	Italy	My Generation	La mia generazione	Wilma Labate	Drama
1997	Italy	The Grey Zone	Le mani forti	Franco Bernini	Drama. Piazza della Loggia bombing.

== 2000s ==
Year	Country	Main title (alternative title)	Original title (original script)	Director	Subject
2001	Italy	Reconciled	Riconciliati	Rosalía Polizzi	Drama
2002	Italy	The Bankers of God: The Calvi Affair	I banchieri di Dio	Giuseppe Ferrara	Biography, crime, drama, history, thriller. Clearstream affair.
2003	Italy; Spain; United Kingdom	I'm Not Scared	Io non ho paura	Gabriele Salvatores	Crime, drama, mystery, thriller. Based on the novel I'm Not Scared.
2003	Italy	The Fugitive	Il fuggiasco	Andrea Manni	Drama. Based on the autobiography Il fuggiasco. Massimo Carlotto.
2003	Italy	The Best of Youth	La meglio gioventù	Marco Tullio Giordana	Drama, romance
2003	Italy; United Kingdom; Germany	Five Moons Square	Piazza delle Cinque Lune	Renzo Martinelli	Drama, thriller. Kidnapping and murder of Aldo Moro.
2003	Italy	Good Morning, Night	Buongiorno, notte	Marco Bellocchio	Drama. Based on the book Il prigioniero. Kidnapping and murder of Aldo Moro.
2004	Italy	If it is light it will be beautiful	Se sarà luce sarà bellissimo	Aurelio Grimaldi	Drama. Kidnapping and murder of Aldo Moro.
2004	Italy; France	Working Slowly (Radio Alice)	Lavorare con lentezza	Guido Chiesa	Drama. Radio Alice.
2005	Italy	Contributory negligence	Concorso di colpa	Claudio Fragasso	Thriller
2005	Italy; France; United Kingdom	Criminal Novel	Romanzo Criminale	Michele Placido	Crime, drama
2006	Italy; France	The Goodbye Kiss	Arrivederci amore, ciao	Michele Soavi	Crime, drama, thriller. Based on the novel Arrivederci amore, ciao.
2007	Italy	Guido who challenged the Red Brigades	Guido che sfidò le Brigate Rosse	Giuseppe Ferrara	Crime, drama. Guido Rossa.
2007	Italy; France	My Brother Is an Only Child	Mio fratello è figlio unico	Daniele Luchetti	Comedy, crime, drama, history. Based on the novel Il fasciocomunista.
2008	Italy; France	Il divo		Paolo Sorrentino	Biography, drama. Giulio Andreotti.
2009	Italy; Belgium; United Kingdom; France	The Front Line	La prima linea	Renato De Maria	Biography, crime, drama. Based on the book Miccia corta. Sergio Segio.

== 2010s ==
Year	Country	Main title (alternative title)	Original title (original script)	Director	Subject
2012	Italy; France	Piazza Fontana: The Italian Conspiracy	Romanzo di una strage	Marco Tullio Giordana	Crime, drama, mystery. Based on the book Il segreto di piazza Fontana. Piazza Fontana bombing.
2014	Italy	Bologna 2 August... The days of anger	Bologna 2 agosto... I giorni della collera	Giorgio Molteni; Daniele Santamaria Maurizio	Drama. Bologna massacre.
2015	Italy	The yellow line	La linea gialla	Francesco Conversano; Nene Grignaffini	Drama. Bologna massacre.
2017	France; Italy	After the War	Après la guerre	Annarita Zambrano	Crime, drama. Marco Biagi.

== 2020s ==
Year	Country	Main title (alternative title)	Original title (original script)	Director	Subject
2020	Italy	The Mattarella crime	Il delitto Mattarella	Aurelio Grimaldi	Crime, drama, history. Piersanti Mattarella.
2020	Italy	Our father	Padrenostro	Claudio Noce	Drama. Prisco Palumbo.
2022	Italy	I was at war but I didn't know it	Ero in guerra ma non lo sapevo	Fabio Resinaro	Drama. Based on the book Ero in guerra ma non lo sapevo. Murder of Pierluigi Torregiani.
2023	Italy	Nuovo Olimpo		Ferzan Özpetek	Drama, romance
2024	Italy; France	The Time It Takes	Il tempo che ci vuole	Francesca Comencini	Drama. Luigi Comencini, Francesca Comencini.
2025	Italy		Albatross	Giulio Base	Biography. Almerigo Grilz.
2025	Italy	The Big Fake	Il falsario	Stefano Lodovichi	Drama, history. Based on the book Il falsario. Antonio Chichiarelli.

== Television films ==
Year	Country	Main title (alternative title)	Original title (original script)	Director	Subject
1978	Italy	West	Occidente	Dante Guardamagna	Drama. Based on the novel Occidente.
1991	Italy; Germany	Women in Arms	Donne armate	Sergio Corbucci	Crime, thriller
1993	Italy	The Dozier case	Il caso Dozier	Carlo Lizzani	Thriller. Kidnapping of James Dozier.
2010	Italy	The draw	Il sorteggio	Giacomo Campiotti	Drama. Red Brigades.

== Television series ==
Year	Country	Main title (alternative title)	Original title (original script)	Director	Subject
1982	Italy	Words and blood	Parole e sangue	Damiano Damiani	Crime
1984	Italy; France		Nucleo zero	Carlo Lizzani	Drama, thriller
2008	Italy	Aldo Moro - The president	Aldo Moro - Il presidente	Gianluca Maria Tavarelli	Biography, drama. Kidnapping and murder of Aldo Moro.
2008–10	Italy	Criminal Novel – The Series	Romanzo criminale – La serie	Stefano Sollima	Crime, drama, thriller
2014	Italy	The broken years	Gli anni spezzati	Graziano Diana	Drama. Luigi Calabresi, Mario Sossi.
2022	Italy; France	Exterior Night	Esterno notte	Marco Bellocchio	Crime, drama, history. Kidnapping and murder of Aldo Moro.
