= Years of Lead (Italy) =

Period of social and political turmoil in Italy

- Part of the Cold War
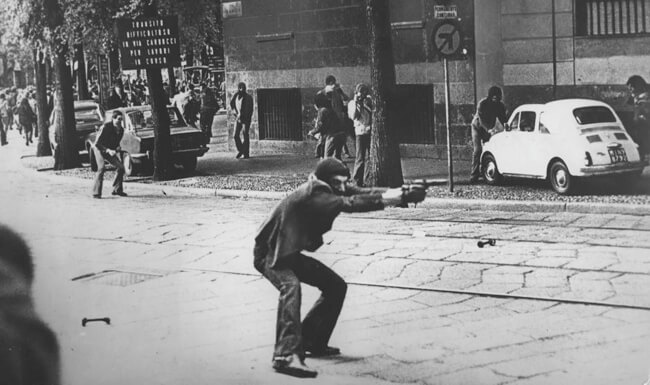
- Leftist militant Giuseppe Memeo aims his gun at police during a rally at Via De Amicis in Milan on May 14th 1977. This picture, taken by Paolo Pedrizzetti, became the defining image of the era
Date	1 March 1968 – 23 October 1988
Location	Italy (mainly Northern Italy and Rome)
Result	Italian Government victory; Most militant and terrorist groups disbanded

Belligerents
Italian government; SISMI; SISDE; Armed Forces; Carabinieri; State Police; NATO (Operation Gladio)	Far-left terrorists: Red Brigades (Note: Disbanded by police.); Front Line (Note: Disbanded by members due to increasing police pressure. Most already joined the Red Brigades; others focused on politics.); October 22 Group (Note: Dismantled by police. Members merged into the Red Brigades and Partisan Action Groups.); PAC (Note: Dismantled by police.); Continuous Struggle (Note: Disbanded due to internal feuds. Some members merged into the Red Brigades whilst others formed Prima Linea.); Workers' Power (Note: Disbanded due to internal disagreements. Some members merged into the group Autonomous Worker.); Workers' Autonomy (Note: Dissolved due to police pressure and members merging into the PAC, Red Brigades, and Prima Linea. Those imprisoned often associated with NAP.); Support by: RAF; Sigurimi (alleged); (Palestine Liberation Organization) PLO (alleged); KGB (alleged); (East Germany) Stasi (alleged); Mukhabarat el-Jamahiriya (alleged); UDBA (alleged)	Far-right terrorists: New Order (Note: Banned, some joined Ordine Nero.); National Vanguard (Note: Banned. Its members joined Ordine Nero.); Black Order; NAR (Note: Dismantled.); Third Position (Note: Dissolved by police. Used by NAR as a cover name later on.); Propaganda Due; Support by: SISMI (factions); Magliana Gang; CIA (alleged); Greek Junta (alleged); Sicilian Mafia (Cosa Nostra) (alleged); Francoist Spain (alleged); Croatian National Resistance (alleged)

Commanders and leaders
Giulio Andreotti; Aldo Moro †; Mariano Rumor; Franco Restivo; Emilio Colombo; Virginio Rognoni; Arnaldo Forlani	Renato Curcio (POW); Margherita Cagol †; Alberto Franceschini (POW); Marco Cattin (POW); Mario Rossi (POW); Giangiacomo Feltrinelli †; Cesare Battisti (POW); Giuseppe Pinelli †; Adriano Sofri (POW); Francesco Lorusso †; Franco Piperno (Note: Fled Italy); Antonio Negri (POW); Oreste Scalzone; Lanfranco Pace; Emilio Vesce (Note: Acquitted)	Franco Freda; Pierluigi Concutelli (POW); Mario Tuti (POW); Stefano Delle Chiaie; Adriano Tilgher; Vincenzo Vinciguerra (POW); Fabrizio Zani (POW); Valerio Fioravanti (POW); Alessandro Alibrandi †; Massimo Carminati (POW); Franco Anselmi †; Roberto Fiore; Gabriele Adinolfi; Licio Gelli (POW)

Units involved
Armed Forces: +90,000 soldiers (1973) (NATO) Gladio: 622 members	BR: Several thousand active members PL: 1,072 members and collaborators O22: 25 members PAC: 60 militants AO: 200 members	Ordine Nuovo: 10,000; National Vanguard: 600–2,000 members at varying times NAR: 53 members Terza Posizione: 42

Casualties and losses
Italy: 14 civil servants killed Armed Forces: 1 Air Force General killed; 1 soldier killed; 2 wounded; Carabinieri: 15 killed; 3 injured; State Police: 32 killed; 1 wounded; Penitentiary Police: 4 killed; Italy: 67 killed in total U.S.: 1 Army officer kidnapped; 1 diplomat murdered	BR: 12,000 far-left militants arrested; 600 fled the country; at least 2 killed; 1 injured; PL: at least 5 killed; 1 arrested; O22: 8 arrested PAC: 1 injured in friendly fire incident; 60 arrested; several tortured; CS: (at least) 1 killed; 5 arrested; AO: 3 killed (Note: By a prematurely detonated explosive they were planting.); 200 exiled	Ordine Nuovo: At least 3 arrested NAR: 53 arrested Terza Posizione: 42 indicted
- Total deaths (including civilians): 428, c. 2,000 physical and psychological injuries

The Years of Lead (Italian: Anni di piombo) were a period of social and political turmoil in Italy that lasted from the late 1960s to the late 1980s, marked by a wave of both far-left and far-right political terrorism.

The Years of Lead are sometimes considered to have begun with the 1968 movement in Italy and the Hot Autumn strikes starting in 1969; the death of the policeman Antonio Annarumma in November 1969; the Piazza Fontana bombing in December of that year, which killed 17 and was perpetrated by right-wing terrorists in Milan; and the death shortly after of anarchist worker Giuseppe Pinelli while in police custody under suspicion of being responsible for the attack, which he was ultimately deemed as not having committed.

The conflict involved violent struggles between militant neo-fascist and far-left organizations, as well as the Italian state. Neo-fascist groups pursued a campaign of indiscriminate bombings and massacres known as the "strategy of tension", which sought to sow panic, blame the left, and provoke an authoritarian coup. Far-left groups, most prominently the Red Brigades, carried out targeted assassinations, kidnappings, and bombings intended to destabilize the state and inspire a proletarian revolution. This political violence emerged from a backdrop of widespread social unrest following the post-war economic boom, and disillusionment with the mainstream political parties, primarily the ruling Christian Democracy and the Italian Communist Party.

Major attacks of the period include the 1969 Piazza Fontana bombing, the 1974 Piazza della Loggia bombing, and the 1980 Bologna Massacre, all committed by neo-fascist or far-right groups. Meanwhile, the 1978 kidnapping and murder of former prime minister Aldo Moro by the Red Brigades left a lasting impact on and stunned the nation. The deadliest single attack of the era was the 1980 Bologna Massacre conducted by the neo-fascist Nuclei Armati Rivoluzionari, which killed 85 people. Between 1968 and 1988, the conflict resulted in 428 deaths and approximately 2,000 injuries attributed to political violence.

The violence began to decline in the early 1980s following the arrest of key political terrorists and Red Brigades leaders and the introduction of anti-terrorism laws that encouraged militants to become state witnesses (pentiti). Parliamentary inquiries later revealed the covert involvement of rogue elements within Italian intelligence services and the secret Propaganda Due (P2) Masonic lodge in the far-right's strategy of tension. NATO's "stay-behind" network in Italy, known as Gladio, was also speculated to be connected to some of these operations, though this remains controversial and was never proved in court. Although most armed groups were dismantled by the end of the 1980s, the Years of Lead have left a profound impact on Italian politics and society.

== Origin of the name ==
The term's origin possibly came about as a reference to the number of shootings during the period of the conflict, or as a reference to a popular 1981 West German film, named Marianne and Juliane in English after the main characters, but which was released in Italy as Anni di piombo. This is closer to the original title, Die bleierne Zeit (The Leaden Time), which refers to the 1950s in West Germany, a period which is perceived as conservative and suppressive by the character of Marianne, a female terrorist within the film. Marianne's terrorist cell is based on the real-life West German far-left militant group the Red Army Faction (RAF), who gained notoriety during the 1970s by kidnapping and killing dozens. Their Italian counterpart, the Red Brigades, copied one of the RAF's 1977 German Autumn crimes in the 1978 kidnapping and murder of Aldo Moro.

== Background ==
The Years of Lead emerged from the widespread social unrest of the late 1960s. The turmoil was fuelled by the rapid and disruptive social changes of the post-war Italian economic miracle, which saw a mass exodus from rural areas and the explosive, often chaotic growth of cities. This transformation, combined with the paralysis of the political system—dominated by the Christian Democracy (DC) in a permanent but unstable coalition—created deep-seated tensions. Expectations for reform in housing, education, and social services, raised by the brief centre-left experiment of the early 1960s, remained largely unfulfilled, leading to profound disillusionment.

This unrest coalesced into two major movements: the student movement and the workers' movement. The Italian student movement, part of the global Protests of 1968, began in late 1967. It was driven by the crisis of an education system that had expanded massively but remained chronically underfunded, overcrowded, and unreformed. The movement quickly developed a radical anti-authoritarian and anti-capitalist critique, challenging not only university structures but also the values of consumer society and the traditional nuclear family. It drew ideological inspiration from a mixture of dissident Catholicism, a revival of Marxist thought outside the traditional Communist Party, and international events such as the Vietnam War and the Cultural Revolution.

The student protests intersected with a powerful wave of labour unrest that culminated in the "Hot Autumn" (Autunno caldo) of 1969. This period saw millions of workers, particularly in the northern industrial centres, engage in massive strikes. The militancy was especially strong among the new generation of semi-skilled workers, many of whom were recent migrants from Southern Italy, who found themselves working in rigid, alienating assembly-line conditions. Student activists joined workers on picket lines, and new forms of struggle emerged, including wildcat strikes and factory occupations, which challenged both management authority and the control of traditional trade unions. While the unions ultimately reasserted their leadership and secured a landmark national contract for metalworkers in late 1969, the "Hot Autumn" fundamentally changed the balance of power in the factories and demonstrated a new potential for mass collective action.

It was in this climate of intense social conflict and revolutionary expectation that armed political violence began to escalate. The Italian Communist Party (PCI), then the most powerful opposition movement, was prevented to gain power by the alliance of most other parties with the Christian Democracy. Its apparent abandonment of revolutionary goals also disappointed left-wing radicals. On the right, neo-fascists remained marginalized since the fall of Benito Mussolini: the Italian Social Movement (MSI) failed to break out of its isolation following its brief alliance with Fernando Tambroni's government in 1960. This situation favored the rise of radicals both on the left and on the right. On the far left, small groups emerged from the student and worker movements, disillusioned with the perceived moderation of the Communist Party and committed to overthrowing the state through armed struggle. On the far right, neo-fascist groups, frustrated by the MSI's failures and inspired by the theories of neofascist Clemente Graziani, initiated the "strategy of tension" — a campaign of indiscriminate bombings designed to create panic, discredit the left, and provoke an authoritarian coup d'état inspired by the Greek coup in 1967. The first major attack of this campaign, the Piazza Fontana bombing of December 1969, is often cited as the symbolic start of the Years of Lead.

== Timeline of events ==
=== 1969 ===
==== Public protests ====
Public protests shook Italy during 1969, with the workers' rights movement and autonomist student movement being particularly active, leading to the occupation of the Fiat Mirafiori automobile factory in Turin.

==== Killing of Antonio Annarumma ====
On 19 November 1969, Antonio Annarumma, a Milanese policeman, was killed during a riot by far-left demonstrators. He was the first civil servant to die in the wave of violence.

==== Piazza Fontana bombing ====
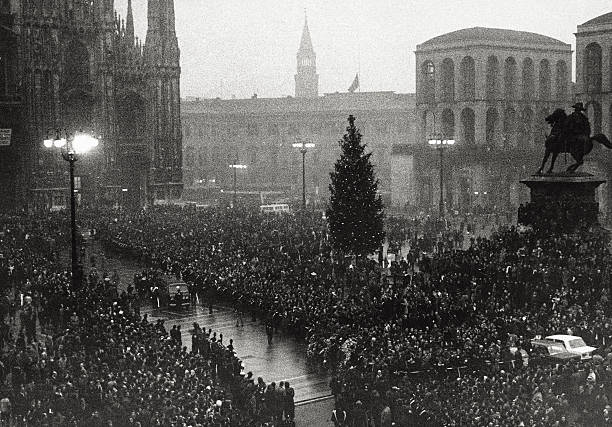
A passage of the funerals of the victims of the Piazza Fontana bombing. The funeral march goes through Milan Cathedral Square. Milan, 12 December 1969

The Victor Emmanuel II Monument, the Banca Nazionale del Lavoro in Rome and the Banca Commerciale Italiana and the Banca Nazionale dell'Agricoltura in Milan were bombed in December.

Local police arrested 80 or so suspects from left-wing groups, including Giuseppe Pinelli, an anarchist initially blamed for the bombing, and Pietro Valpreda. Their guilt was denied by left-wing members, especially by members of the student movement, then prominent in Milan's universities, as they believed that the bombing was carried out by fascists. Following the death of Giuseppe Pinelli, who mysteriously died on 15 December while in police custody, the radical left-wing newspaper Lotta Continua started a campaign accusing police officer Luigi Calabresi of Pinelli's murder. In 1975, Calabresi and other police officials were acquitted by judge Gerardo D'Ambrosio who decided that Pinelli's fall from a window had been caused by him becoming ill and losing his balance.

Meanwhile, the anarchist Valpreda and five others were convicted and jailed for the bombing. They were released after three years of preventive detention. Then, two neo-fascists, Franco Freda (resident in Padua) and Giovanni Ventura, were arrested and accused of organizing the massacre before being acquitted by the Supreme Court in 1987 for lack of evidence.

In the 1990s, new investigations into the Piazza Fontana bombing, citing new witnesses' testimony, implicated Freda and Ventura again. However, the pair cannot be put on trial again because of double jeopardy, as they were acquitted of the crime in 1987.

=== 1970 ===
==== Birth of the Red Brigades ====
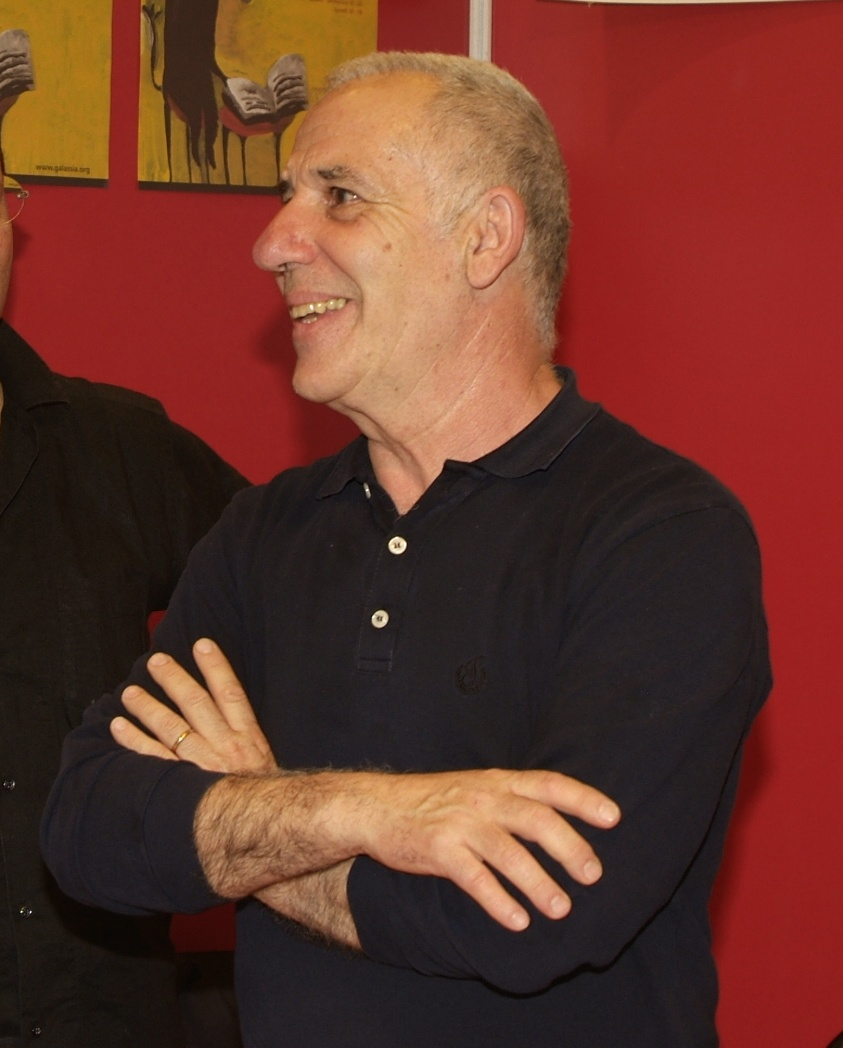
Renato Curcio in 2008

The Red Brigades were founded in August 1970 by Renato Curcio and Margherita (Mara) Cagol, who had met as students at the University of Trento and later married, and Alberto Franceschini.

While the Trento group around Curcio had its main roots in the Sociology Department of the Catholic University, the Reggio Emilia group (around Franceschini) mostly included former members of the FGCI (the Communist youth movement) expelled from the parent party for their extremist views.

Another group of militants came from the Sit-Siemens factories in Milan; these were Mario Moretti, a union official, Corrado Alunni, who would leave the Red Brigades to found another organization "fighter", and Alfredo Buonavita, a blue-collar worker.

The first action of the RB was burning the car of Giuseppe Leoni (a leader of Sit-Siemens company in Milan) on 17 September 1970, in the context of the labour unrest within the factory.

==== Borghese coup attempt ====
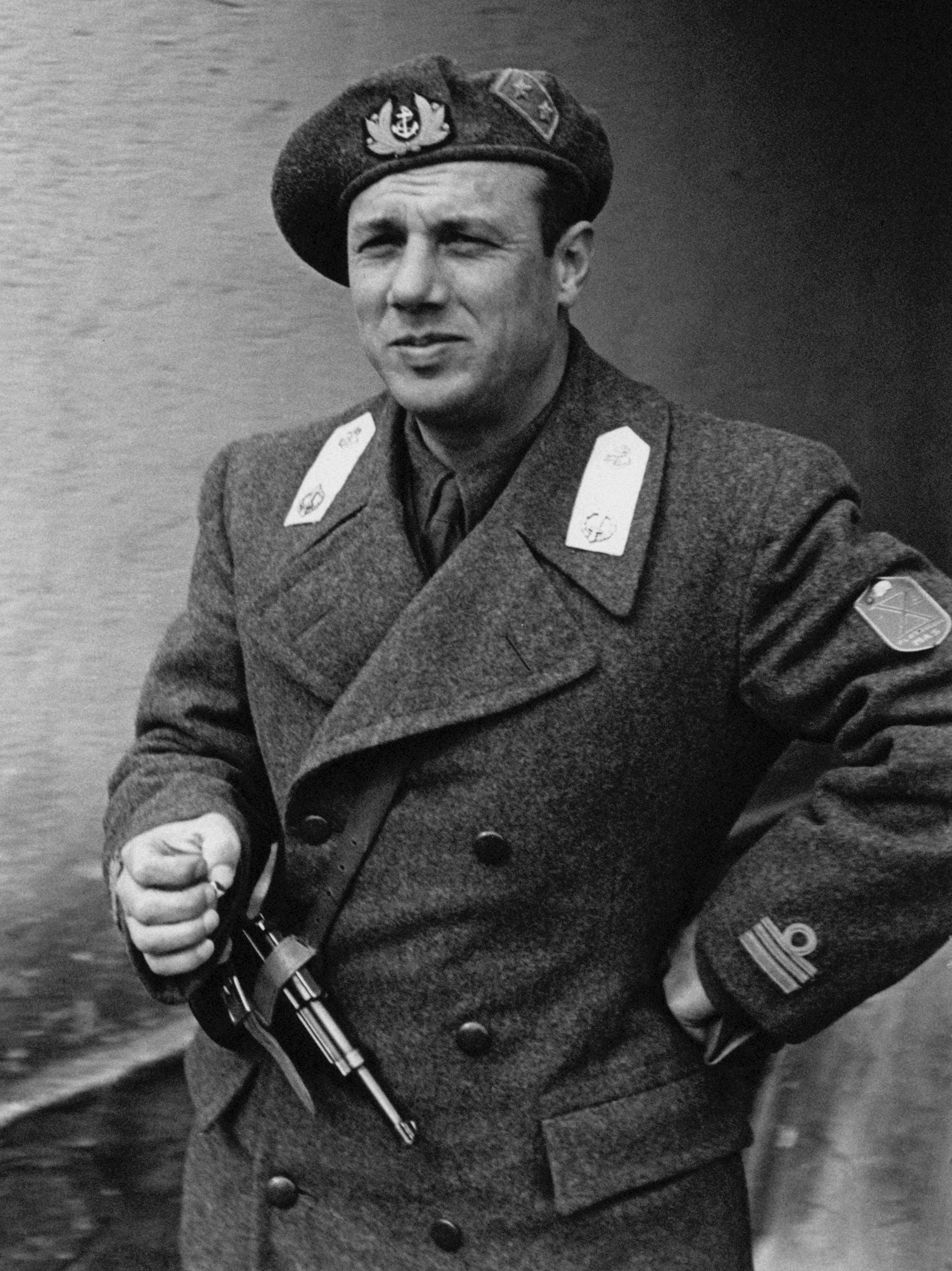
Junio Valerio Borghese

In December, a neo-fascist coup, dubbed the Golpe Borghese, was planned by young far-right fanatics, mainly veterans of Italian Social Republic, and supported by members of the Corpo Forestale dello Stato, along with right-aligned entrepreneurs and industrialists. The "Black Prince", Junio Valerio Borghese, took part in it. The coup, called off at the last moment, was discovered by the newspaper Paese Sera, and publicly exposed three months later.

=== 1971 ===
==== Assassination of Alessandro Floris ====
On 26 March, Alessandro Floris was assassinated in Genoa by a unit of the October 22 Group, a far-left terrorist organization. An amateur photographer had taken a photo of the killer that enabled police to identify the terrorists. The group was investigated, and more members were arrested. Some fled to Milan and joined the Gruppi di Azione Partigiana (GAP) and, later, the Red Brigades.

The Red Brigades considered Gruppo XXII Ottobre its predecessor and, in April 1974, they kidnapped Judge Mario Sossi in a failed attempt at freeing the jailed members. Years later, the Red Brigades killed judge Francesco Coco on 8 June 1976, along with his two police escorts, Giovanni Saponara and Antioco Deiana, in revenge.

=== 1972 ===
==== Assassination of Luigi Calabresi ====
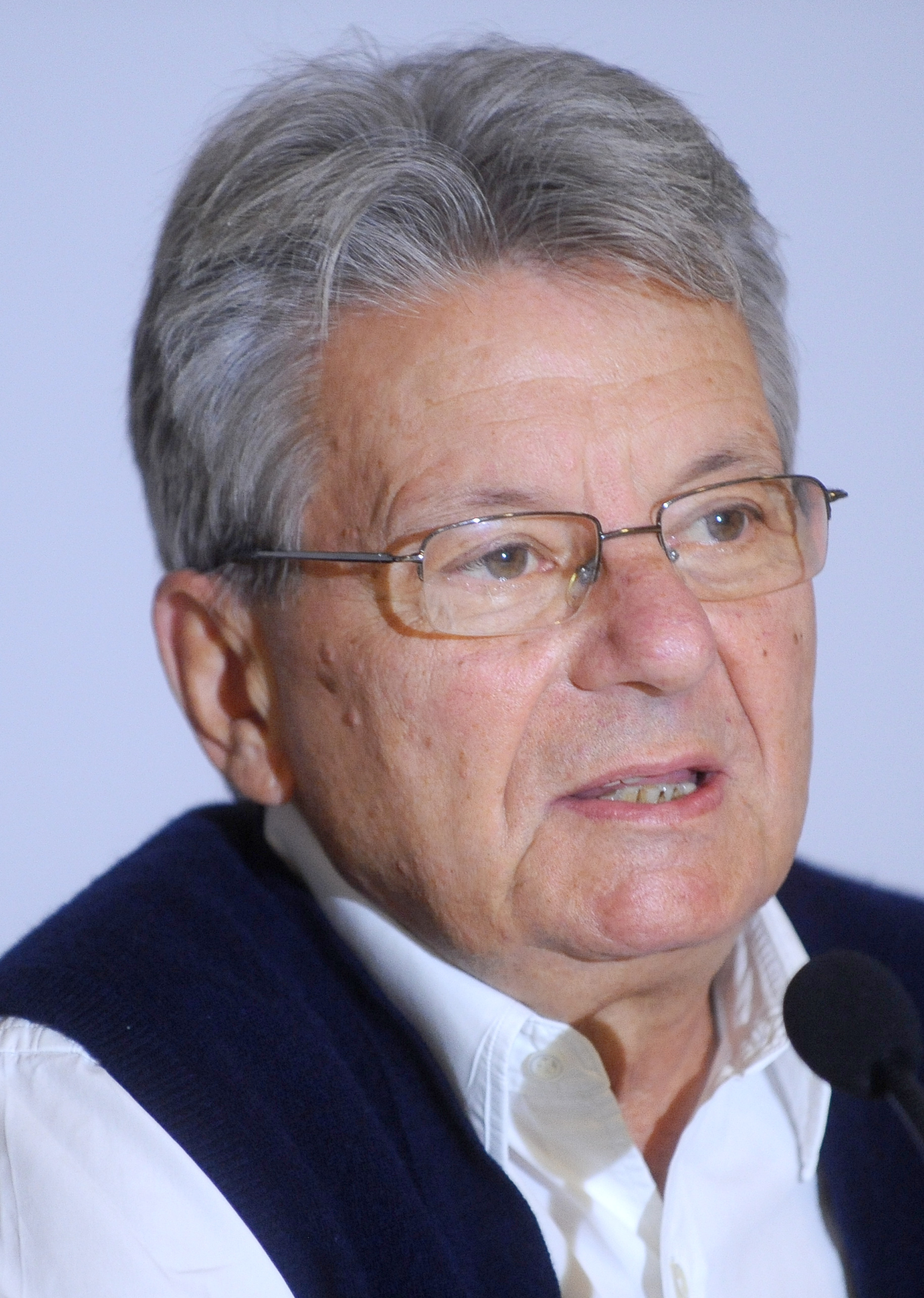
Adriano Sofri in 2014

On 17 May 1972, police officer Luigi Calabresi, a recipient of the gold medal of the Italian Republic for civil valour, was killed in Milan. Authorities initially focused on suspects in Lotta Continua; then it was assumed that Calabresi had been killed by neo-fascist organizations, bringing about the arrest of two neo-fascist activists, Gianni Nardi and Bruno Stefano, along with German Gudrun Kiess, in 1974. They were ultimately released. Sixteen years later, Adriano Sofri, Giorgio Petrostefani, Ovidio Bompressi, and Leonardo Marino were arrested in Milan following Marino's confession to the murder. Their trial finally established their guilt in organising and carrying out the assassination. Calabresi's assassination opened the chapter of assassinations carried out by armed groups of the far-left.

==== Peteano bombing ====
On 31 May 1972, three Italian Carabinieri were killed in Peteano in a bombing attributed to Lotta Continua. Officers of the Carabinieri were later indicted and convicted for perverting the course of justice. Judge Casson identified Ordine Nuovo member Vincenzo Vinciguerra as the man who had planted the Peteano bomb.

The neo-fascist terrorist Vinciguerra, arrested in the 1980s for the bombing in Peteano, declared to magistrate Felice Casson that this false flag attack had been intended to force the Italian state to declare a state of emergency and to become more authoritarian. Vinciguerra explained that the SISMI military intelligence agency had protected him by allowing his escape to Francoist Spain.

Casson's investigation revealed that the right-wing organization Ordine Nuovo had collaborated with the Italian Military Secret Service, SID (Servizio Informazioni Difesa). Together, they had engineered the Peteano attack and then blamed the Red Brigades. He confessed and testified that he had been covered by a network of sympathizers in Italy and abroad who had ensured that he could escape after the attack. "A whole mechanism came into action", Vinciguerra recalled, "that is, the Carabinieri, the Minister of the Interior, the customs services and the military and civilian intelligence services accepted the ideological reasoning behind the attack."

=== 1973 ===
==== Primavalle fire ====
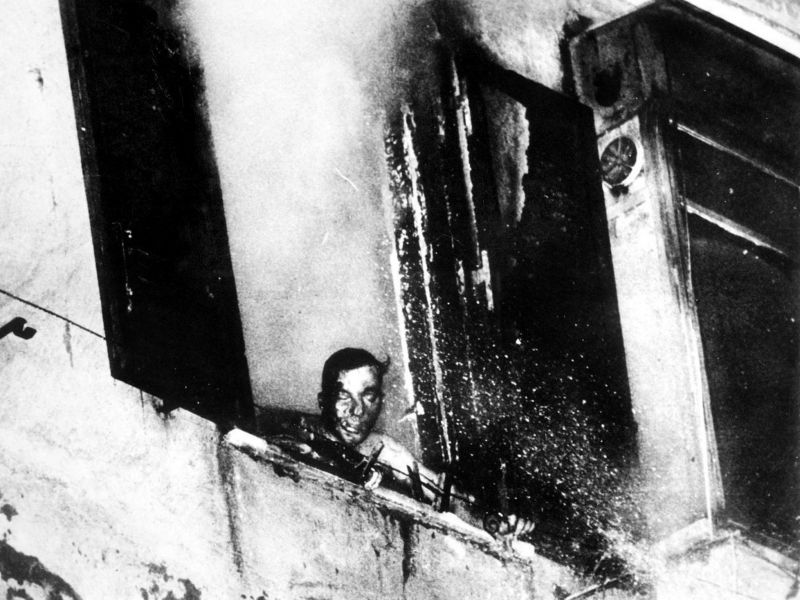
Virgilio Mattei, killed by communists in the Primavalle fire

A 16 April 1973 arson attack by members of Potere Operaio on the house of neo-fascist Italian Social Movement (MSI) militant Mario Mattei in Primavalle, Rome, resulted in his two sons, aged 22 and 8, being burned alive.

==== Milan Police command bombing ====
During a 17 May 1973 ceremony honouring Luigi Calabresi, in which the Interior Minister was present, Gianfranco Bertoli, an anarchist, threw a bomb that killed four and injured 45.

In 1975, Bertoli was sentenced to life imprisonment: despite self-identifying as an anarchist, the Milan Court wrote that he was connected with the far-right New Order and was a SID informant and a confidant of the police.

In the 1990s, it was suspected that Bertoli was a member of Gladio but he denied it in an interview: in the list of 622 Gladio members made public in 1990, his name is missing.

A magistrate investigating the assassination attempt of Mariano Rumor found that Bertoli's files were incomplete. General Gianadelio Maletti, head of the SID from 1971 to 1975, was convicted in absentia in 1990 for obstruction of justice in the Mariano Rumor case.

=== 1974 ===
==== Piazza della Loggia bombing ====
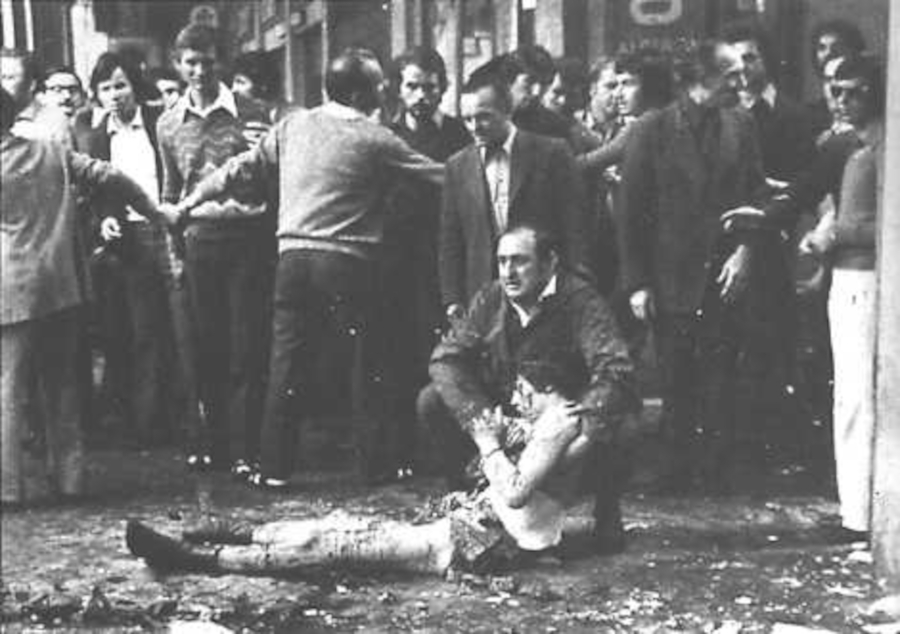
Piazza della Loggia bombing

In May 1974, a bomb exploded during an anti-fascist demonstration in Brescia, Lombardy, killing eight and wounding 102. On 16 November 2010, the Court of Brescia acquitted the defendants: Francesco Delfino (a Carabiniere), Carlo Maria Maggi, Pino Rauti, Maurizio Tramonte, and Delfo Zorzi (members of the Ordine Nuovo neo-fascist group). The prosecutor had requested life sentences for Delfino, Maggi, Tramonte, and Zorzi, and acquittal for lack of evidence for Pino Rauti. The four defendants were acquitted again by the appeal court in 2012 but, in 2014, the supreme court ruled that the appeal trial would have to be held again at the appeal court of Milan for Maggi and Tramonte. Delfino and Zorzi were definitely acquitted. On 22 July 2015, the appeal court sentenced Maggi and Tramonte to life imprisonment for ordering and coordinating the massacre.

==== First murder by the Red Brigades ====
On 17 June 1974, two members of MSI were murdered in Padua. Initially, an internal feud between neo-fascist groups was suspected, since the crime had occurred in the city of Franco Freda. However, the murder was then claimed by the Red Brigades: it was the first murder of the organization, which, until then, had only committed robberies, bombings, and kidnappings.

==== Planned coup ====
Count Edgardo Sogno said in his memoirs that in July 1974, he visited the Central Intelligence Agency (CIA) station chief in Rome to inform him of preparations for a coup. Asking what the United States (US) government would do in case of such a coup, Sogno wrote that he was told, "the United States would have supported any initiative tending to keep the communists out of government". General Maletti declared, in 2001, that he had not known about Sogno's relationship with the CIA and had not been informed about the coup, known as Golpe bianco (White Coup), led by Randolfo Pacciardi.

==== Bombing of Italicus train ====
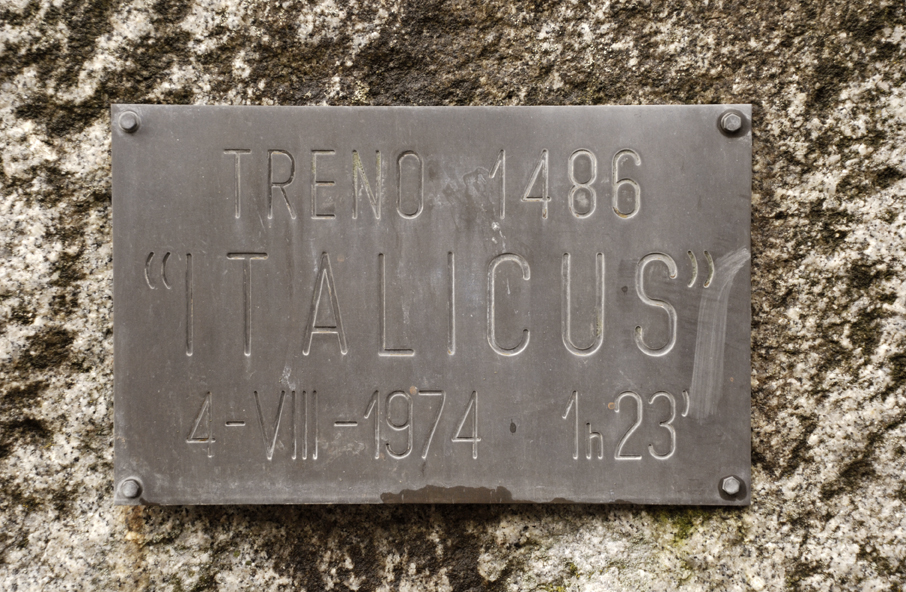
Memorial plaque of the Italicus Express bombing

On 4 August 1974, 12 people were killed and 48 others injured in the bombing of the Italicus Rome-Brenner express train at San Benedetto Val di Sambro. Responsibility was claimed by the neo-fascist terrorist organization Ordine Nero.

==== Arrest of Vito Miceli ====
General Vito Miceli, chief of the SIOS military intelligence agency in 1969, and head of the SID from 1970 to 1974, was arrested in 1974 on charges of "conspiracy against the state". Following his arrest, the Italian secret services were reorganized by a 24 October 1977 law in an attempt to reassert civilian control over the intelligence agencies. The SID was divided into the current SISMI, the SISDE, and the CESIS, which was to directly coordinate with the Prime Minister of Italy. An Italian Parliamentary Committee on Secret services control (Copaco) was created at the same time. Miceli was acquitted in 1978.

==== Arrest of Red Brigades leaders ====
In 1974, some leaders of the Red Brigades, including Renato Curcio and Alberto Franceschini, were arrested, but new leadership continued the war against the Italian right-wing establishment with increased fervour.

The Italian government showed reluctance in addressing far-left terrorism. The ruling Christian Democracy party underestimated the threat of the Red Brigades, speaking of "phantom" Red Brigades, emphasising instead the danger of neo-fascist groups. The Italian left wing was also less worried by the existence of an armed communist organization than by the possible abuses by the police against protesters, calling for the disarmament of police during street demonstrations.

The year before, Potere Operaio had disbanded, although Autonomia Operaia carried on in its wake. Lotta Continua also dissolved in 1976, although their magazine continued for several years. From the remnants of Lotta Continua and similar groups, the terror organization Prima Linea emerged.

=== 1975 ===
On 28 February, student and fascist activist Mikis Mantakas was killed by far-leftists during riots in Rome.

On 13 March, a young militant of Italian Social Movement (MSI) Sergio Ramelli was assaulted in Milan by a group of Avanguardia Operaia and wounded in the head with wrenches (aka Hazet 36). He died on 29 April, after 47 days in the hospital.

On 25 May, student and left activist Alberto Brasili was stabbed in Milan by neo-fascist militants.

On 5 June, Giovanni D'Alfonso, a member of the Carabinieri police force, was killed by the Red Brigades.

On 2 November, famous director and leftist intellectual Pier Paolo Pasolini was abducted, tortured and murdered at a beach in Ostia. Multiple journalists, investigators and Giuseppe Pelosi, who was convicted of the murder of Pasolini, have alleged that the murder had a political background and was connected to the Banda della Magliana or P2. A year prior to his murder, Pasolini alleged in his column for Il Corriere della Sera that the Italian State engaged in a strategy of tension with organized crime and right-wing terrorist groups.

=== 1976 ===
On 27 January, two Carabinieri officers are shot dead in their sleep at a station at Alcamo Marina in what is knows as the Alcamo Marina Massacre. First the Red Brigades are suspected, but later four teenagers are arrested and convicted. After more than 30 years the four are acquitted after it was revealed that their confessions were obtained by torture. Some have suspected that prior to their murder the Carabinieri had stumbled across an arms delivery that belonged to either organized crime or Gladio.

On 29 April, lawyer and militant of Italian Social Movement (MSI) Enrico Pedenovi was killed in Milan by the organization Prima Linea. This was the first assassination conducted by Prima Linea.

On 8 July, in Rome, Judge Vittorio Occorsio was killed by neo-fascist Pierluigi Concutelli.

On 14 December, in Rome, policeman Prisco Palumbo was killed by the Nuclei Armati Proletari.

On 15 December, in Sesto San Giovanni (a town near Milan), vice chief Vittorio Padovani and Marshal Sergio Bazzega were killed by young extremist Walter Alasia.

=== 1977 ===
On 11 March, Francesco Lorusso was killed by the military police (the Carabinieri) at the university of Bologna.

On 12 March, a Turin policeman Giuseppe Ciotta was killed by Prima Linea.

On 22 March, a Rome policeman Claudio Graziosi was killed by Nuclei Armati Proletari.

On 28 April, in Turin, lawyer Fulvio Croce was killed by the Red Brigades.

On 12 May, in Rome, 19-year-old student Giorgiana Masi was killed during clashes between police officers and demonstrators.

On 14 May, in Milan, activists from a far-left organization pulled out their pistols and began to shoot at the police, killing policeman Antonio Custra. A photographer took a photo of an activist shooting at the police. This year was called the time of the "P38", referring to the Walther P38 pistol.

On 16 November, in Turin, Carlo Casalegno, deputy director of the newspaper La Stampa, was seriously wounded in an ambush of the Red Brigades. He died thirteen days later, on November 29.

=== 1978 ===
On 4 January, in Cassino, chief of Fiat security Carmine De Rosa was killed by leftists.

On 7 January, in Rome, young militants of Italian Social Movement (MSI) Franco Bigonzetti and Francesco Ciavatta were killed by far-leftists, another militant (Stefano Recchioni) was killed by the police during a violent demonstration. Some militants left the MSI and founded the Nuclei Armati Rivoluzionari, which had ties with the Roman criminal organization Banda della Magliana.

On 20 January, in Florence, policeman Fausto Dionisi was killed by Prima Linea.

On 7 February, in Prato (a town near Florence), notary Gianfranco Spighi was killed by leftists.

On 14 February, in Rome, Judge Riccardo Palma was killed by the Red Brigades.

On 10 March, in Turin, Marshal Rosario Berardi was killed by the Red Brigades.

On 16 March in Milan, the killing of Fausto and Iaio occurred. Nobody has ever been found responsible for the double murder.

On 11 April, in Turin, policeman Lorenzo Cutugno was killed by the Red Brigades.

On 20 April, in Milan, policeman Francesco Di Cataldo was killed by the Red Brigades.

On 10 October, in Rome, judge Girolamo Tartaglione was killed by the Red Brigades.

On 11 October, in Naples, university teacher Alfredo Paolella was killed by Prima Linea.

On 8 November, in Patrica (a town near Frosinone), judge Fedele Calvosa was killed by the Unità Comuniste Combattenti.

==== Kidnapping and assassination of Aldo Moro ====
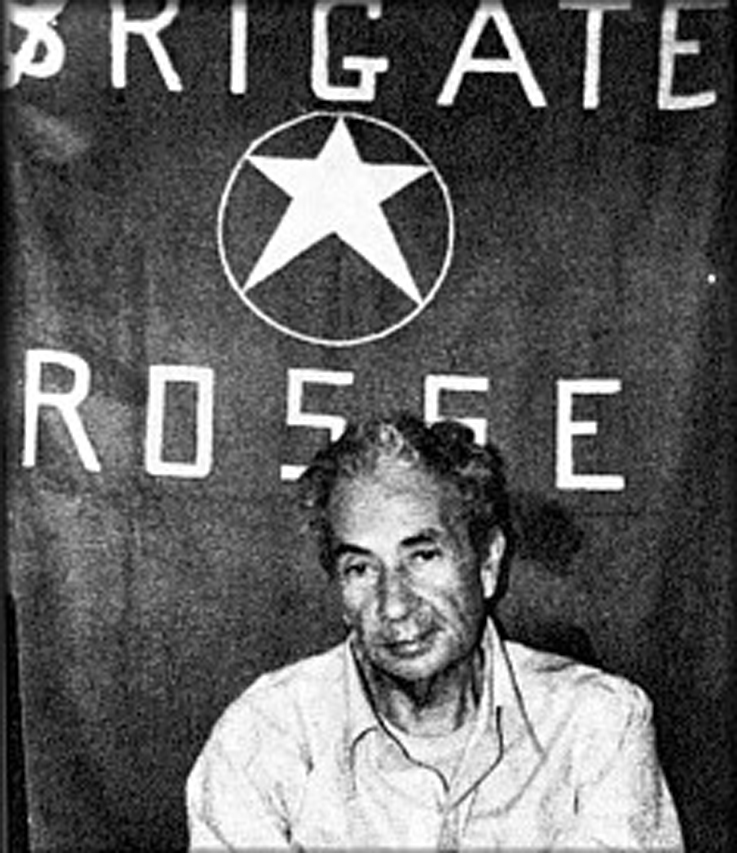
Aldo Moro, photographed during his kidnapping by the Red Brigades

On 16 March 1978, Aldo Moro was kidnapped by the Red Brigades (then led by Mario Moretti), and five of his security detail were killed. Aldo Moro was a left-leaning Christian Democrat who served several times as prime minister; before his murder, he had been trying to include the Italian Communist Party (PCI), headed by Enrico Berlinguer, in the government through a deal called the Historic Compromise. PCI was, at the time, the largest communist party in Western Europe; mainly because of its non-extremist and pragmatic stance, its growing independence from Moscow and its eurocommunist doctrine. The PCI was especially strong in areas such as Emilia-Romagna, where it had stable government positions and mature practical experience, which may have contributed to a more pragmatic approach to politics. The Red Brigades were fiercely opposed by the Communist Party and trade unions: some left-wing politicians used the expression "comrades who do wrong" (Compagni che sbagliano). Franco Bonisoli, one of RB's members who participated in the kidnapping, declared that the decision to kidnap Moro "was taken a week before, a day was decided, it could have been 15 or 17 March".

On 9 May 1978, after a summary "trial of the people", Moro was murdered by Mario Moretti with, it was also determined, the participation of Germano Maccari. The corpse was found that same day in the trunk of a red Renault 4 in via Michelangelo Caetani, in downtown Rome. A consequence was the fact that the PCI did not gain executive power.

Moro's assassination was followed by a large clampdown on the social movement, including the arrest of many members of Autonomia Operaia, including Oreste Scalzone and political philosopher Antonio Negri (arrested on 7 April 1979).

=== 1979 ===
Active armed organizations grew from 2 in 1969 to 91 in 1977 and 269 in 1979. In that year there were 659 attacks.

==== Most yearly assassinations ====
On 19 January, Turin policeman Giuseppe Lorusso was killed by the Prima Linea organization.

On 24 January, worker and trade unionist Guido Rossa was killed in Genoa by the Red Brigades.

On 29 January, Judge Emilio Alesandrini was killed in Milan by Prima Linea.

On 9 March, university student Emanuele Iurilli was killed in Turin by Prima Linea.

On 20 March, investigative journalist Mino Pecorelli was gunned down in his car in Rome. Prime Minister Giulio Andreotti and Mafia boss Gaetano Badalamenti were sentenced in 2002 to 24 years in prison for the murder, though the sentences were overturned the following year.

On 3 May, in Rome, policemen Antonio Mea and Piero Ollanu were killed by the Red Brigades.

On 13 July, in Druento (a town near Turin), policeman Bartolomeo Mana was killed by Prima Linea.

On 13 July, in Rome, Lieutenant Colonel of Carabinieri Antonio Varisco was killed by the Red Brigades.

On 18 July, barman Carmine Civitate was killed in Turin, by Prima Linea.

On 21 September, Carlo Ghiglieno was killed in Turin by a group of Prima Linea.

On 11 December, five teachers and five students of the "Valletta" Institute in Turin were shot in the legs by Prima Linea.

=== 1980 ===
==== More assassinations ====
On 8 January, Milan policemen Antonio Cestari, Rocco Santoro, and Michele Tatulli were killed by the Red Brigades.

On 25 January, Genoa policemen Emanuele Tuttobene and Antonio Casu were killed by the Red Brigades.

On 29 January, petrochemical plant manager Silvio Gori was killed by the Red Brigades.

On 5 February, in Monza, Paolo Paoletti was killed by Prima Linea.

On 7 February, Prima Linea militant William Vaccher was killed on suspicion of treason.

On 12 February, in Rome, at the "La Sapienza" University, Vittorio Bachelet, vice-president of the High Council of the Judiciary and former president of the Roman Catholic association Azione Cattolica, was killed by the Red Brigades.

On 10 March, in Rome, cook Luigi Allegretti was killed by Compagni armati per il Comunismo.

On 16 March, in Salerno, Judge Nicola Giacumbi was killed by the Red Brigades.

On 18 March, in Rome, Judge Girolamo Minervini was killed by the Red Brigades.

On 19 March, in Milan, Judge Guido Galli was killed by a group of Prima Linea.

On 10 April, in Turin, Giuseppe Pisciuneri a Mondialpol guard, was killed by Ronde Proletarie.

On 28 May, in Milan, journalist Walter Tobagi was killed by Brigata XXVIII marzo.

On 23 June, in Rome, Judge Mario Amato was killed by the Nuclei Armati Rivoluzionari.

On 31 December, in Rome, General of Carabinieri Enrico Galvaligi was killed by the Red Brigades.

==== Bologna massacre ====
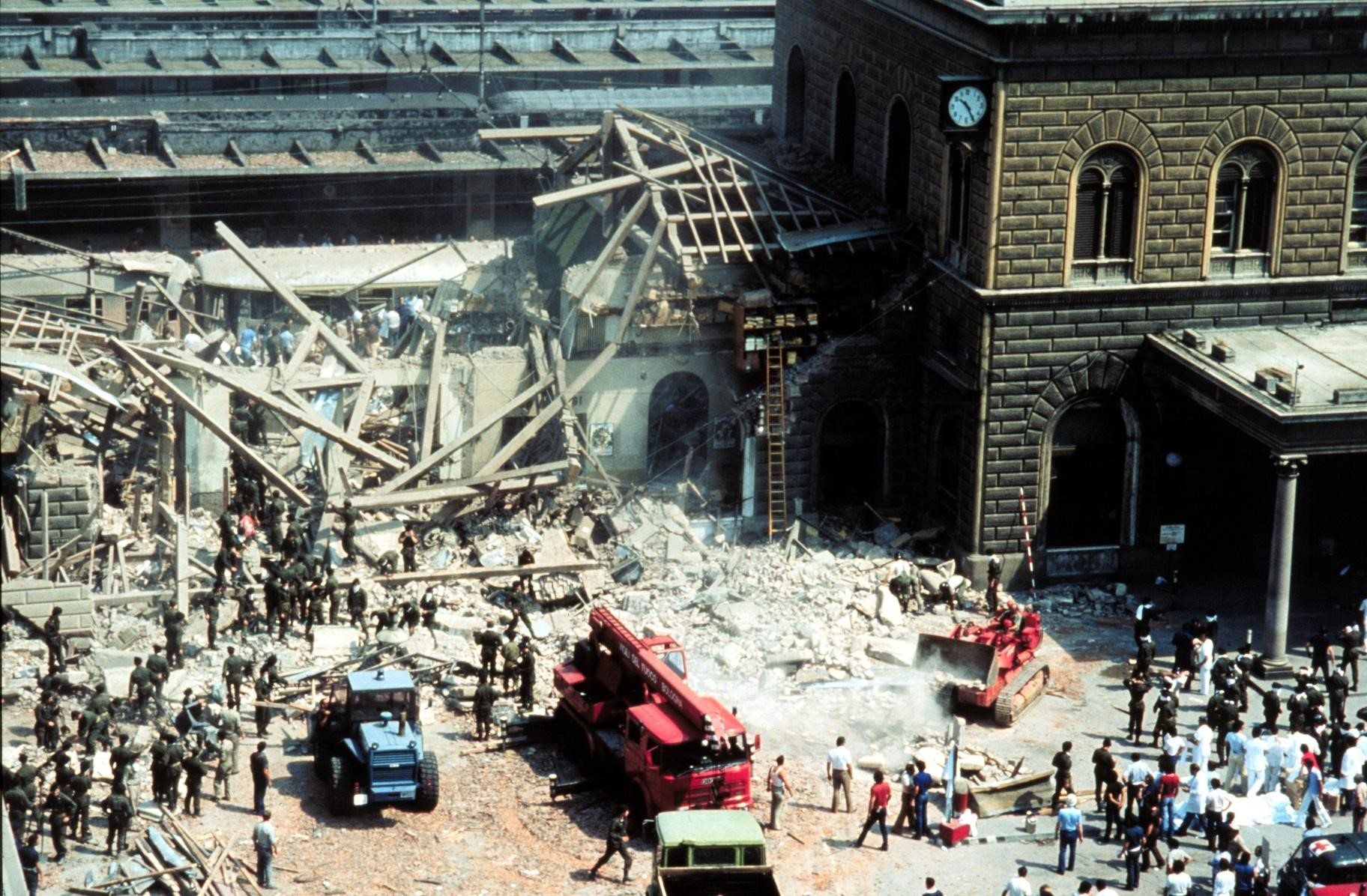
Aftermath of the Bologna massacre

On 2 August, a bomb killed 85 people and wounded more than 200 in Bologna. Known as the Bologna massacre, the blast destroyed a large portion of the city's main railway station. This was found to be a neo-fascist bombing, mainly organized by the Nuclei Armati Rivoluzionari: Francesca Mambro and Valerio Fioravanti were sentenced to life imprisonment. In April 2007, the Supreme Court confirmed the conviction of Luigi Ciavardini, a NAR member associated closely with close ties to Terza Posizione. Ciavardini received a 30-year prison sentence for his role in the attack.

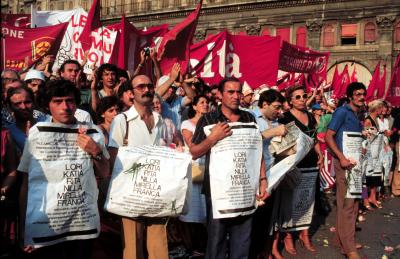
Funerals of the victims of the Bologna bombing of 2 August 1980

=== 1981 ===
On 5 July, Giuseppe Taliercio, director of the Porto Marghera's Montedison petrochemical establishment, was killed by the Red Brigades after 47 days of kidnapping.

On 3 August, Roberto Peci, an electrician, was killed by the Red Brigades after being kidnapped and held for 54 days. The killing was a vendetta against his brother Patrizio, a member of the RB who became a pentito the year before.

On 17 December, James L. Dozier, an American general and the deputy commander of NATO's South European forces based in Verona, was kidnapped by the Red Brigades. He was freed in Padua on 28 January 1982 by the Nucleo Operativo Centrale di Sicurezza (NOCS), an Italian police anti-terrorist task force.

=== 1982 ===
On 26 August, a group of Red Brigades terrorists attacked a military troop convoy in Salerno. In the attack, Corporal Antonio Palumbo and policemen Antonio Bandiera and Mario De Marco were killed. The terrorists escaped.

On 21 October, a group of Red Brigades terrorists attacked a bank in Turin, killing two guards, Antonio Pedio and Sebastiano d'Alleo.

=== 1984 ===
On 15 February, Leamon Hunt, American diplomat and Director General of the international peacekeeping force, Multinational Force and Observers (MFO), was killed by the Red Brigades.

==== Christmas massacre ====
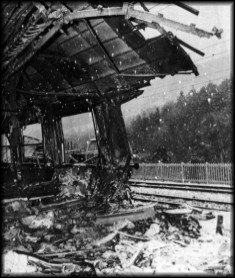
An UIC-X carriage was destroyed following the Train 904 bombing

On 23 December, a bomb on a train between Florence and Rome killed 16 and wounded more than 200. In 1992, Mafia soldiers Giuseppe Calò and Guido Cercola were sentenced to life imprisonment, Franco Di Agostino (another member of the Sicilian Mafia) got 24 years, and German engineer Friedrich Schaudinn 22 for the bombing. Camorra's member Giuseppe Misso was sentenced to 3 years; other members of Camorra, Alfonso Galeota and Giulio Pirozzi were sentenced to 18 months, and their role in the massacre was deemed marginal. On 18 February 1994, the Florence court absolved MSI member of Parliament Massimo Abbatangelo from the massacre charge, but ruled him guilty of giving the explosive to Misso in the spring of 1984. Abbatangelo was sentenced to 6 years. Victims' relatives asked for a tougher sentence, but lost the appeal and had to pay for judicial expenses.

=== 1985 ===
On 9 January, in Torvaianica (a town near Rome), policeman Ottavio Conte was killed by the Red Brigades.

On 27 March, in Rome, economist Ezio Tarantelli was killed by the Red Brigades.

=== 1986 ===
On 10 February 1986, Lando Conti, former mayor of Florence, was killed by the Red Brigades.

=== 1987 ===
On 20 March 1987, Licio Giorgieri, a general in the Italian Air Force, was assassinated by the Red Brigades in Rome.

=== 1988 ===
On 16 April 1988, Senator Roberto Ruffilli was assassinated in an attack by a group of the Red Brigades in Forlì. It was the last murder committed by the Red Brigades: on 23 October a group of irriducibili (hardliners) declared, in a document, that war against the State was over.

== Events after 1988 ==
=== Resurgence in the 1990s and 2000s ===
In the late 1990s and early 2000s, a resurgence of Red Brigades terrorism led to further assassinations.

On 20 May 1999, Massimo D'Antona, a consultant to the Ministry of Labour, was assassinated in an attack by a group of terrorists of the Red Brigades in Rome.

On 19 March 2002, Marco Biagi, an academic and consultant to the Ministry of Labour, was assassinated in an attack by a group of terrorists of the Red Brigades in Bologna.

On 2 March 2003, Emanuele Petri, a policeman, was assassinated by a group of Red Brigades terrorists near Castiglion Fiorentino.

=== 2021 arrests ===
In 2021, France arrested seven of the dozens of fugitive leftist militants who had been given French protection for decades. Among the arrested were Giorgio Pietrostefani, a founding member of the Lotta Continua group who was convicted of the murder of Milan police commissioner Luigi Calabresi. Others were Marina Petrella, Roberta Cappelli and Sergio Tornaghi, who had received life sentences for murders and kidnappings.

== Countries that granted participants asylum ==
=== France ===
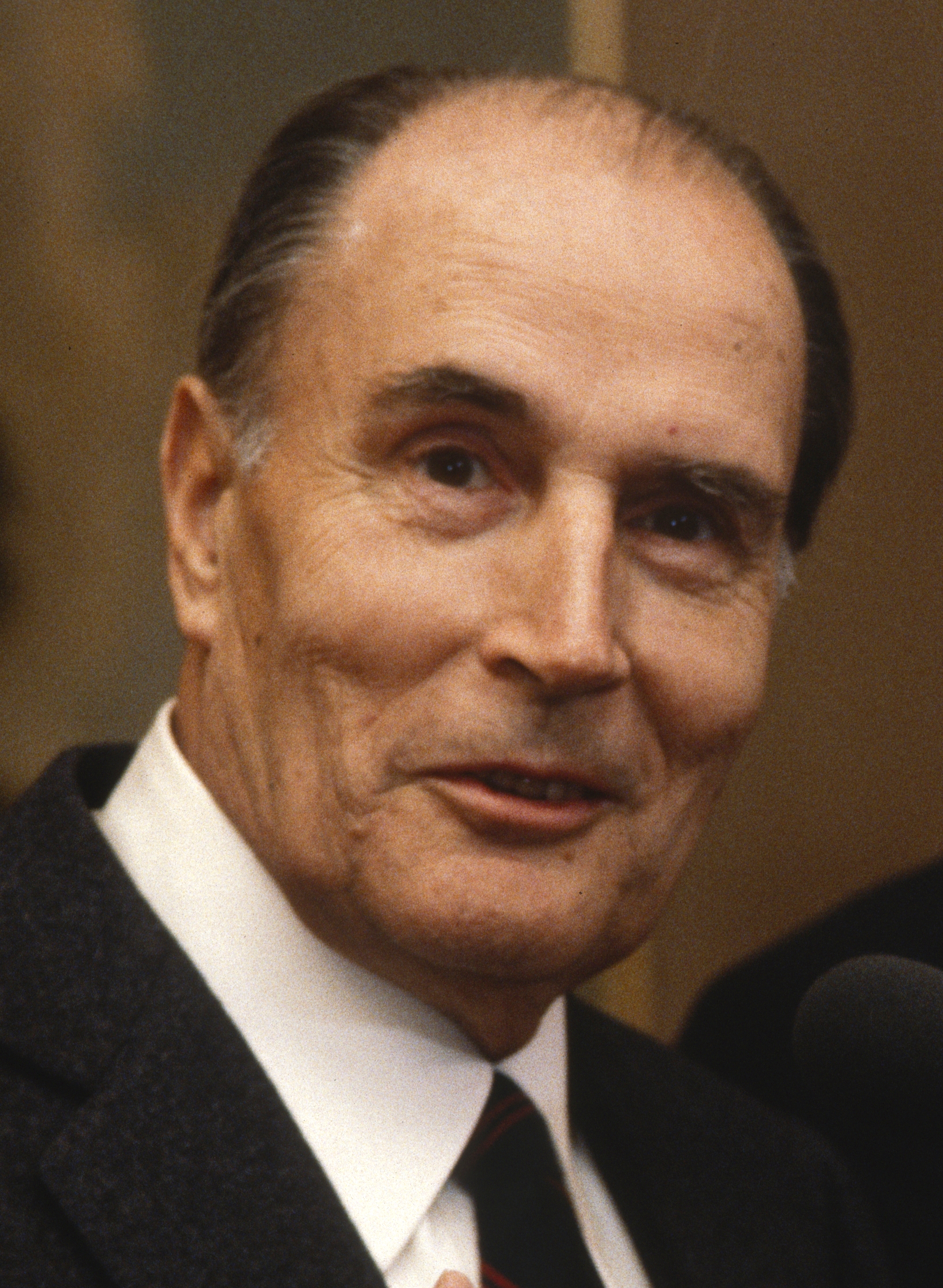
François Mitterrand

The Mitterrand doctrine, which was established in 1985 by then socialist French president François Mitterrand, stated that Italian far-left terrorists who fled to France and who were convicted of violent acts in Italy, excluding "active, actual, bloody terrorism" during the "Years of Lead", would receive asylum and would not be subject to extradition to Italy. They would be integrated into French society.

The act was announced on 21 April 1985, at the 65th Congress of the Human Rights League (Ligue des droits de l'homme, LDH), stating of Italian criminals who had given up their violent pasts and had fled to France would be protected from extradition to Italy:

Italian refugees ... who took part in terrorist action before 1981 ... have broken links with the infernal machine in which they participated, have begun a second phase of their lives, have integrated into French society ... I told the Italian government that they were safe from any sanction by the means of extradition.

According to Reuters, the Italian guerillas numbered in the dozens. The French decision had a long term negative effect on French-Italian relations.

Upon the arrest in France of seven Italian far-left militants, French Minister of Justice Eric Dupond-Moretti said he was "proud to participate to this decision that I hope will allow Italy to turn after 40 years a bloody and tearful page of its history."

=== Brazil ===
Some Italian citizens accused of terrorist acts have found refuge in Brazil such as Cesare Battisti and other former members of the Armed Proletarians for Communism, a far-left militant and terrorist organization.

=== Nicaragua ===
Some Italian far-left activists found political asylum in Nicaragua, including Alessio Casimirri, who took part in the kidnapping of Aldo Moro.

=== Spain ===
Some of the far-right activists, including Stefano Delle Chiaie and Junio Valerio Borghese, found refuge in Francoist Spain. Here a network of activists was established that facilitated the arrival of other far-right figures while simultaneously establishing clandestine businesses.

== Impact on emigration from Italy ==
The Years of Lead were believed to have increased the rate of immigration to the United States from Italy. However, as the Years of Lead came to an end in the 1980s and political stability increased in Italy, the rate of immigration to the United States decreased. In the years 1992–2002, Italian immigration ranged nearly 2,500 people annually.

== See also ==
- 1968 movement in Italy
- Armed, far-right organizations in Italy
- Definition of terrorism
- German Autumn
- Greek junta
- Guido Rossa
- History of the Italian Republic
- Hot Summer of 1975 (Portugal)
- Il sangue dei leoni
- Insurgency in Aceh (Indonesia)
- Kurdistan Workers' Party insurgency
- La notte della Repubblica (TV programme)
- List of films about the Years of Lead (Italy)
- Movement of 1977
- Operation Gladio
- Political violence in Turkey (1976–1980)
- Poliziotteschi
- Red Brigades
- Strategy of tension

== Bibliography ==
- Cento Bull, Anna; Giorgio, Adalgisa (2006). Speaking Out and Silencing: Culture, Society and Politics in Italy in the 1970s.
- Coco, Vittorio (2015). "Conspiracy Theories in Republican Italy: The Pellegrino Report to the Parliamentary Commission on Terrorism". Journal of Modern Italian Studies. 20 (3): 361–376. doi:10.1080/1354571X.2015.1026148.
- Diazzi, Alessandra; Tarabochia, Alvise Sforza, eds. (2019). The Years of Alienation in Italy: Factory and Asylum Between the Economic Miracle and the Years of Lead. doi:10.1007/978-3-030-15150-8. ISBN 978-3-030-15150-8.
- Drake, Richard (1999). "Italy in the 1960s: A Legacy of Terrorism and Liberation". South Central Review. 16: 62–76. doi:10.2307/3190077. JSTOR 3190077.
- Ginsborg, Paul (1990). A History of Contemporary Italy: Society and Politics, 1943–1988. Palgrave Macmillan. ISBN 978-1-4039-6153-2.
- King, Amy (2020). "Antagonistic martyrdom: memory of the 1973 Rogo di Primavalle". Modern Italy. 25 (1): 33–48. doi:10.1017/mit.2019.35.

=== In Italian ===
- Deliolanes, Dimitri (2019). Colonnelli. Il regime militare greco e la strategia del terrore in Italia (in Italian). Rome: Fandango Libri.
- Galli, Giorgio (1986). Storia del partito armato (in Italian). Milan: Rizzoli Editore.
- Guerra, Nicola (2021). "Il linguaggio politico della sinistra e della destra extraparlamentari negli anni di piombo" [The political language of the extra-parliamentary left and right in the years of lead]. Italian Studies (in Italian). 76 (4). Taylor & Francis: 406–420. doi:10.1080/00751634.2021.1923172. S2CID 236341889.
- Montanelli, Indro; Cervi, Mario (1989). L'Italia dei due Giovanni (in Italian). Milan: Rizzoli Editore.
- Montanelli, Indro; Cervi, Mario (1991). L'Italia degli anni di piombo (in Italian). Milan: Rizzoli Editore.
- Montanelli, Indro; Cervi, Mario (1993). L'Italia degli anni di fango (in Italian). Milan: Rizzoli Editore.
- Zavoli, Sergio (1992). La notte della repubblica (in Italian). Rome: Nuova Eri.
