= Killing of Fausto and Iaio =

1978 killings in Milan, Italy

Fausto Tinelli and Lorenzo Iannucci
- Fausto e Iaio
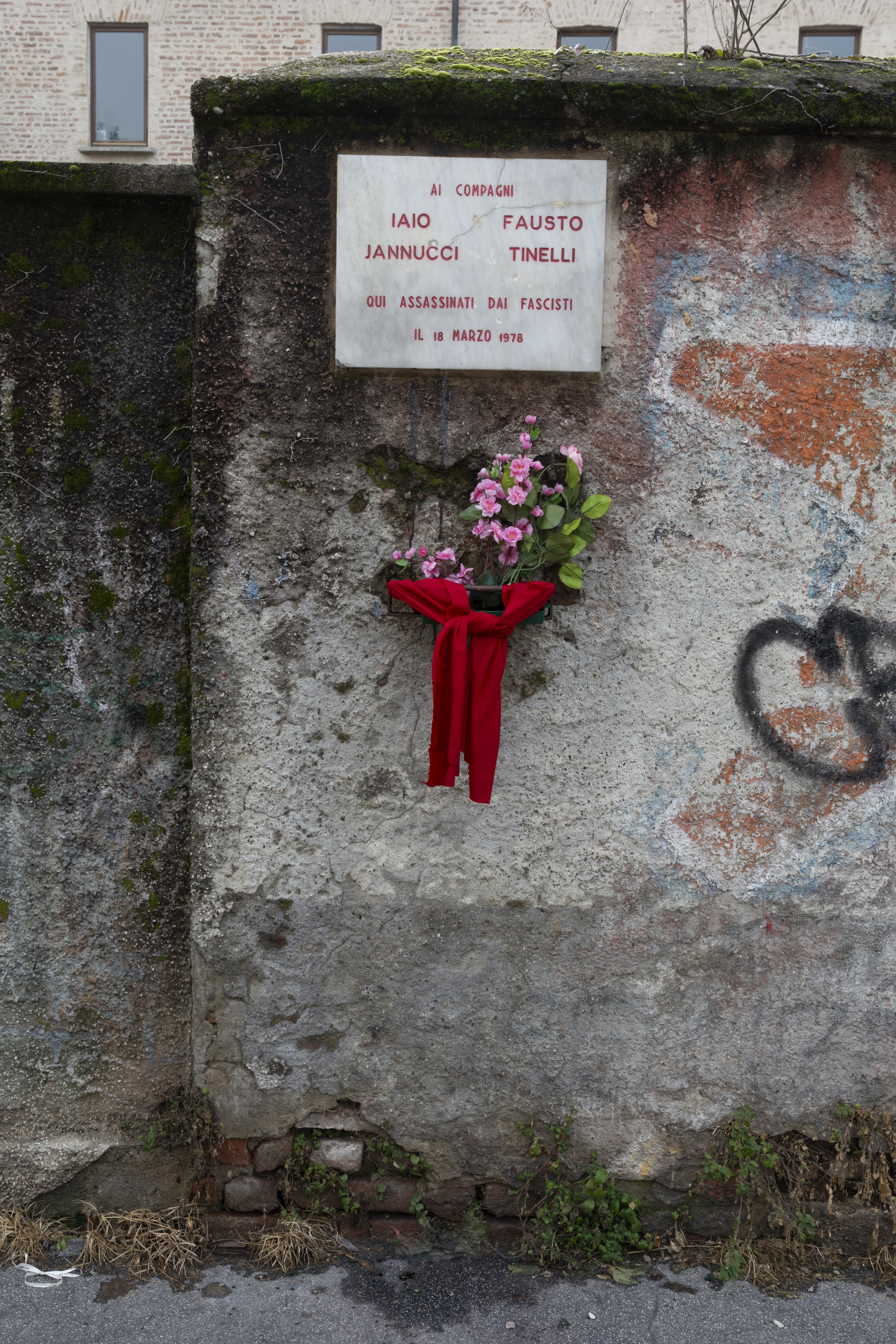
- Memorial plaque on via Mancinelli, Milan
- Born: 25 November 1959 and 29 September 1959; Trento and Telese, respectively
- Died: 18 March 1978 (aged 18) (both); Milan (both) 45°29′21.5″N 09°13′39.5″E
- Cause of death: Assassination
- Era: Years of Lead
- Website: faustoeiaio.info

Fausto Tinelli (1959–1978) and Lorenzo "Iaio" Iannucci (1959–1978) were two Italian left-wing activists who were shot dead after a street confrontation in Milan on 18 March 1978 during the Years of Lead. An official investigation into their deaths closed without a conviction in 2000. Various theories have been suggested for the double murder, involving the neo-fascist underground, the Italian intelligence agencies, the kidnapping of Aldo Moro, and local drug dealers.

== Background ==
Fausto Tinelli was born on 25 November 1959 in Trento. When he was a child, his parents moved to the district of Casoretto in Milan. After school, he studied mechanical engineering followed by fine art. He was politically left-wing, sympathetic to the militant party Lotta Continua (Continuous Struggle) but not a fully-fledged member. He became friends with Lorenzo Iannucci, known as Iaio, when they were children playing at the local oratory. Iannucci was born on 29 September 1959 in Telese in the province of Benevento and also moved to Milan as a child. When they were older, the two bonded through their mutual love of music and reading, and frequented Centro Sociale Leoncavallo, a left-wing self-managed social centre founded in 1975 which hosted social and cultural activities for the local community. Iannucci worked as a labourer. With other Leoncavallo activists, the two men were researching the local heroin trade and its connection to local neo-fascists.

After the strikes of the Hot Autumn of 1969, Italy entered into the Years of Lead (anni di piombo), a time of political upheaval in which various left-wing and right-wing groups fought in the streets. Neo-fascists began a campaign known as the strategy of tension. Over the course of the following decade of politically motivated violence, 415 people were killed. Twelve days before the double murder, neo-fascist Franco Anselmi had been shot dead whilst robbing a gun shop in Rome and two days prior to that murder, former prime minister Aldo Moro had been kidnapped by the Red Brigades, a Marxist–Leninist revolutionary group.

== Double murder ==
On 18 March 1978, Tinelli and Iannucci (commonly known as Fausto and Iaio) had been spending time together in Casoretto. They were planning to eat dinner at Tinelli's house and then go to a concert at Leoncavallo. Between 19:30 and 20:00, they passed the corner of via Casoretto and via Mancinelli, where they encountered three other men. Witnesses reported hearing muffled shots and both Iannucci and Tinelli fell to the ground; the former died immediately and the latter died after being rushed to hospital.

The three assailants ran away on foot, one dropping a blue hat. One of them had fired eight 7.65 calibre bullets from a Beretta gun; the weapon had been hidden in a plastic bag in order not to leave any used cartridges behind. In the days following the double assassination, there was a vigil at the site and a demonstration of between 100,000 and 300,000 people.

== Theories on murderers ==
Nobody has ever been convicted for the crime and there are different theories about the involvement of neo-fascists, the Italian intelligence agencies, and local drug dealers. In the immediate aftermath, four far-right groups claimed responsibility for the killings. Several figures in Italy's neo-fascist underground were linked to the murders, such as Massimo Carminati and Mario Corsi. One of the groups claiming responsibility was the far-right Esercito nazional rivoluzionario, Brigata combattente Franco Anselmi (Revolutionary National Army, Franco Anselmi brigade), whose name referenced Anselmi. In their communique, the brigade claimed they wanted to destroy the political system and take revenge for Anselmi's killing days before. The investigation was formally ended by Judge Clementina Forleo in 2000 who said there was considerable evidence against Claudio Bracci, Carminati, and Corsi, but not enough to convict them.

Another line of enquiry was that Iannucci and Tinelli were killed on account of the report they were compiling with other Leoncavallo activists about heroin selling in the local area, which linked the drug dealing to neo-fascists. In the late 1970s, anti-fascist activists were targeting the heroin trade. The double murder has also been linked to the kidnapping of Moro, since it was later discovered that the Red Brigades had a safe house close to Tinelli's home. In 2011, Tinelli's mother told the mainstream media that she blamed the intelligence agencies for her son's murder, because the third-floor flat in the building where the family lived had been used by a security agency to monitor the Red Brigades' apartment, and she thought she and her son had been put under surveillance.

== Legacy ==
Journalist Daniele Biachessi wrote a book about the murders entitled Fausto e Iaio: La speranza muore a diciotto anni (Fausto and Iaio: Hope dies at 18). The association Familiari e Amici di Fausto e Iaio (Relatives and Friends of Fausto and Iaio) campaigned for gardens in Milan to be named after the two men and in 2012, the gardens of Piazza Durante were dedicated to them. There was also an attempt to unofficially rename the road where the men were murdered to via Fausto e Iaio. The play Viva L'Italia: Le morti di Fausto e Iaio (Long Live Italy: The Deaths of Fausto and Iaio) was written by Roberto Scarpetti and premiered in 2013. In 2023, forty-five years after the murders, Fausto Tinelli's brother Bruno said that his family was still working to find out what had happened.

== See also ==
- List of unsolved murders (1900–1979)
