= Alessandro Alibrandi =

Italian neofascist terrorist (1960–1981)

- Corriere di Bologna article on Alibrandi's death, with allegations about the Bologna judiciary (1981)
- Born: 12 June 1960; Rome, Italy
- Died: 5 December 1981 (aged 21); Rome, Italy
- Cause of death: Gunshot wounds
- Other name: "Ali Baba"
- Organization: Armed Revolutionary Nuclei
- Known for: Acts of terrorism
- Political party: MSI
- Movement: Neofascism
- Opponents: Republic of Italy; Red Brigades
- Father: Antonio Alibrandi

Alessandro Alibrandi (12 June 1960 – 5 December 1981) was an Italian terrorist and a member of the neo-fascist organization Nuclei Armati Rivoluzionari. He was killed during a firefight with the police in Rome while attempting to steal their weapons.

== Early life and family ==
Alessandro Alibrandi's father, Antonio Alibrandi, came from a wealthy family of Civitavecchia landowners. In his days as a law student in the Facoltà di Giurisprudenza (jurisprudence faculty), Antonio Alibrandi was a far-right activist. He entered the judiciary in December 1953 and rose to serve as investigating magistrate in Rome for fifteen years. Antonio and his wife had three children: Alessandro, born on 12 June 1960, Cristina, and Lorenzo.

Alessandro enrolled in the Liceo Scientifico Statale John Fitzgerald Kennedy high school, in the Monteverde area. It is said that he sometimes used to walk around the Liceo corridors with a gun tucked over his trouser belt.

== Political militancy ==
Alibrandi became active in the neofascist party Movimento Sociale Italiano or MSI (Italian Social Movement) from an early age, first in its Fronte della Gioventù (Youth Front), and then in the FUAN (Fronte universitario d'azione nazionale, University Front of National Action). Nicknamed "Ali Baba" by his comrades, he quickly gravitated towards armed action. Joining him were several schoolmates and friends, most notably Valerio "Giusva" Fioravanti, Massimo Carminati, and Franco Anselmi, all of whom were frustrated with what they perceived to be MSI apathy in the face of "communist aggression". (Note: Invoking episodes such as the Primavalle fire or the Acca Larentia killings.)

== Armed militancy ==
On 30 September 1977, a group of MSI activists ran out of the party offices at Medaglie d'Oro to chase after people who were outside distributing anti-fascist leaflets. According to a subsequent testimony in 1981 by convicted neofascist terrorist and pentito Cristiano Fioravanti, he and Alibrandi, who were among the MSI militants, gave chase to twenty-year-old student Walter Rossi and killed him in via Elio Donato, with one 9mm pistol which they passed among them.

In late 1977, Alibrandi, the Fioravanti brothers, Carminati, Anselmi, Francesca Mambro, Dario Pedretti, Luigi Aronica, and other far-right militants, most of them former MSI members, formed the group Nuclei Armati Rivoluzionari (Armed Revolutionary Nuclei). In his testimony as a pentito, Cristiano Fioravanti later reported that NAR were never a "structured, hierarchical" organization "like the Red Brigades" and that the acronym was used by a number of neofascist armed militants for their actions.

On 28 February 1978, the third anniversary of the death of Mikis Mantakas, a Greek member of MSI's student front who was killed in a clash with left-wingers, Alibrandi along with other NAR members, including the two Fioravanti brothers, reached Piazza Don Bosco, near the Cinecittà district, where they ambushed a small group of young communist militants and killed Roberto Scialabba, an electrician.

On 27 November 1979, Alessandro Alibrandi, along with NAR members Valerio Fioravanti, Giuseppe Dimitri and Domenico Magnetta, robbed at gunpoint the Chase Manhattan Bank branch in Rome, while Massimo Carminati acted as getaway driver. By this time, NAR, through the mediation of Franco Giuseppucci and Danilo Abbruciati, had connected with the crime organization Banda della Magliana, which acted as money launderer for NAR's robbery loot.

The law enforcement authorities were closing in on Alibrandi and his comrades, so he left the country in 1981 and enlisted in the Maronite militia of the Kataeb Party, in Lebanon. There he trained with the Lebanese whose trainers ostensibly included Tzahal personnel. A SISDE report dated 25 June 1981 and signed by SISDE vicedirettore Vincenzo Parisi, which was leaked in 2020, stated that Alibrandi had at one time been treated for unspecified wounds in the Israeli military hospital in Nahariya.

Following the arrests of the Fioravanti brothers and others, he returned to Italy in June 1981 to "form the new NAR." The next target was DIGOS officer Francesco Straullu who was being accused in far-right media of "torturing" neofascists caught by the police. Straullu and officer Ciriaco Di Roma were driving in their car through the Acilia frazione, on 21 October 1981, when they were ambushed and assassinated by Alibrandi and other NAR members.

== Death ==
On the morning of 5 December 1981, Alibrandi was killed during a firefight with policemen. That morning, a group formed by Walter Sordi, Pasquale Belsito, Ciro Lai, and Alibrandi, went looking for a police patrol to disarm and take their guns. They set up on a bench near the Labaro train station, on the Via Flaminia, near Rome, when a police car passed them at slow speed and then suddenly reversed back towards them. Alibrandi immediately opened fire shooting at the car.

One policeman, 21-year-old Ciro Capobianco, was hit in the lungs while inside the patrol car. He would die two days later in the hospital. Another policeman got out and ran behind a corner at the train station from where he started returning fire. The third policeman, Salvatore Barbuto, ran to a nearby restaurant chased by Sordi whose firing injured him in the ribs and by Alibrandi. The injured policeman fired back and hit Alibrandi who fell to the ground, mortally wounded. The NAR unit, in a car they stole on the scene, disappeared towards Rome, leaving behind Alibrandi.

== Aftermath ==
The funeral of policeman Ciro Capobianco at San Gennaro in Naples was attended by a large crowd of people and the President of the Republic Sandro Pertini. In 2005, the State bestowed posthumously upon Capobianco the Gold Medal for Civil Valor. Salvatore Barbuto, by that time police chief inspector, was awarded in 2010 the State's Medal for Civil Valor.

Italian neo-fascists organized on 5 December 1998, the anniversary of Alibrandi's death, a memorial concert in the far-right social center "PortAperta," which was also attended by his father Antonio (Note: Antonio Alibrandi died on 15 September 2018. See Bocchino (2018).) and his brother Lorenzo. In a 2013 interview, Massimo Carminati, an old acquaintance of Alibrandi and at the time of the interview leader of the Mafia Capitale, claimed that Alibrandi was killed by friendly fire, relating what he was ostensibly told by "eye witness" Lorenzo Lai. Carminati's claims, however, contained errors, such as mistaking Lorenzo for Ciro Lai who actually participated in the 1981 Via Flaminia firefight.

== See also ==
- Years of Lead (Italy)
- Armed, far-right organizations in Italy
