= Marco Biagi =

Marco Biagi can refer to:

- Marco Biagi (jurist) (1950–2002), Italian jurist
- Marco Biagi (politician) (born 1982), Scottish SNP politician
