= Nuclei Armati Proletari =

The Armed Proletarian Cells (Italian: Nuclei Armati Proletari, abbreviated NAP) was a far-left terrorist group active in Southern Italy, from 1974 to 1977, during the so-called "Years of Lead". NAP was responsible for numerous terrorist acts.

== Organization ==
In contrast to the Red Brigades, NAP was structured "horizontally", with independently constituted cells.

Incarcerated members of NAP were looking for new members and supporters among criminal prisoners, defining them as "sub-proletarian class".

== See also ==
- Communist terrorism
- Red Brigades
- Prima Linea
- Armed Proletarians for Communism
