= Cesare Battisti (militant) =

Italian former militant and author

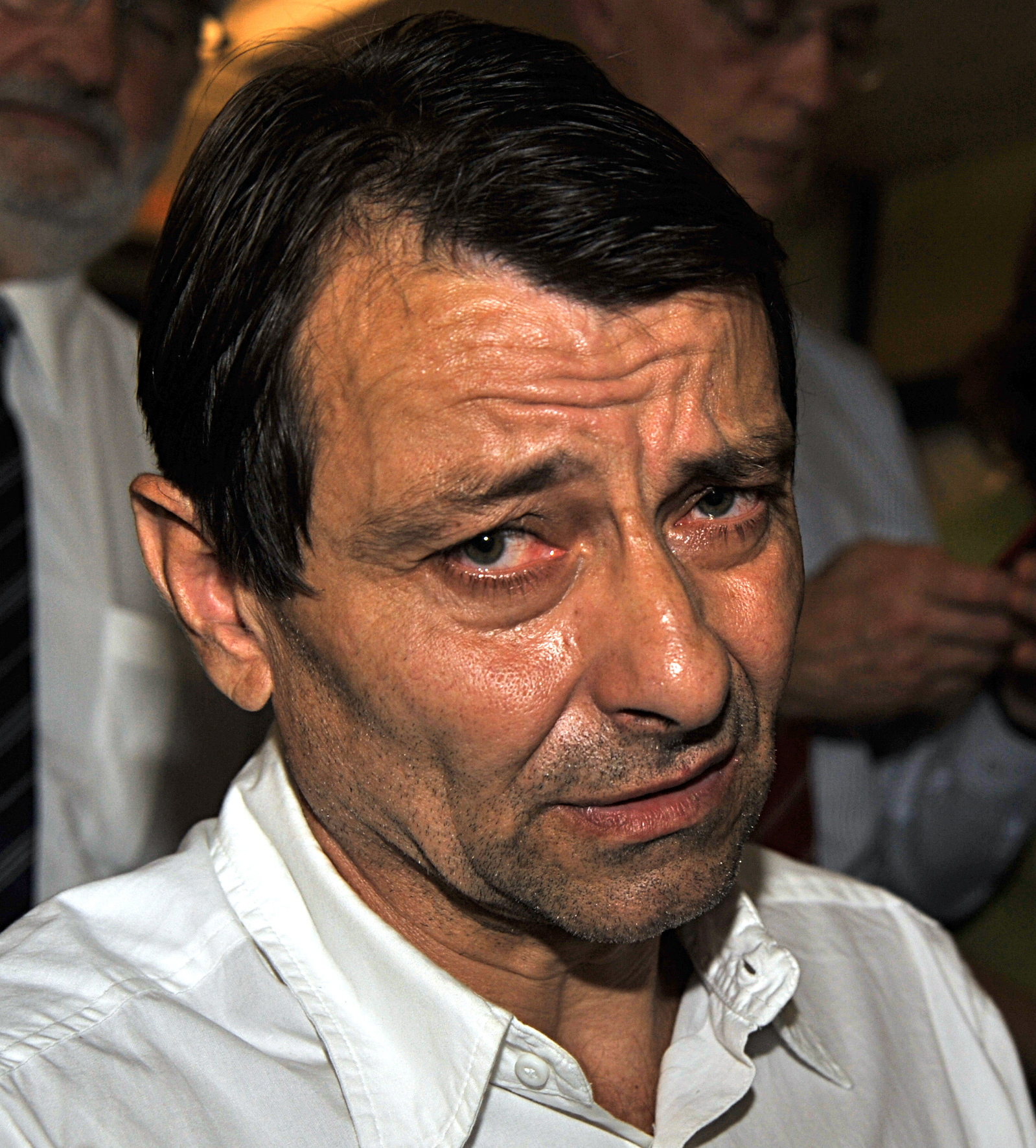
- Battisti in 2009
- Born: 18 December 1954 (age 71); Cisterna di Latina, Latina, Italy
- Height: 1.73 m (5 ft 8 in)
- Spouses: Laurence Battisti (1983–1997); Joice Lima Passos dos Santos (2015–2017)
- Children: Valentina (b. 1984); Charlene (b. 1995); Raul (b. 2013)
- Status: Convicted; incarcerated at Casa Circondariale di Oristano
- Criminal charges: Two murders, and an accomplice in two more
- Penalty: Life imprisonment

Cesare Battisti (born 18 December 1954) is an Italian former member of the left-wing militant group Armed Proletarians for Communism (PAC), who is currently imprisoned after years on the run. Active during the Italian Years of Lead, Battisti was sentenced to life imprisonment in Italy for four homicides (two policemen, a jeweller and a butcher). He fled first to France in 1981, where he received protection under the Mitterrand doctrine.

Battisti was tried in absentia and sentenced to 12 years for being a member of an armed group and for the material killing of two people and instigating another two homicides, based on testimony from Pietro Mutti. He was sentenced to life in prison in 1995. After the de facto repeal of the Mitterrand doctrine in 2002, Battisti fled to Brazil under a false identity to avoid a possible extradition, where he lived as a free man until an order of extradition issued in December 2018. He then fled to Santa Cruz in Bolivia, where he was arrested in March 2019 by an Italian team of Interpol officers and extradited to Italy.

Until 25 March 2019, Battisti denied having committed any of the murders he had been sentenced for; on that date, he admitted the involvement in four killings and apologized to the victims' relatives.

He is also a fiction author, having written 15 novels.

== Youth and PAC membership ==
Cesare Battisti was born in 1954 at Cisterna di Latina, near Latina. He left the classical lyceum he was attending in 1971, engaged in petty crime, and then moved on to more serious offenses. In 1976, he moved to Milan, and took part in the activities of the Armed Proletarians for Communism (PAC), an autonomist Marxist group which conducted armed struggle, and which had a "horizontal", decentralized structure, opposed to the centralist organization of the Red Brigades (BR). The organization, which counted approximately 60 members, had its roots in Barona, a district in the south of Milan.

Four assassinations were committed by the PAC: Antonio Santoro, a prison guard accused by the PAC of mistreatment of prisoners (on 6 June 1978 in Udine); jeweler Pierluigi Torregiani, who had shot and killed a robber in an act of self-defense (on 16 February 1979 in Milan); Lino Sabbadin, a butcher and member of the neo-fascist Italian Social Movement (on the same date, near Mestre); and DIGOS agent Andrea Campagna, who had participated in the first arrests in the Torregiani case (on 19 April 1979 in Milan). The PAC also engaged in several robberies.

The murder of Torregiani and Sabbadin had been decided upon by the PAC because both of them had previously killed left-wing militants. Torregiani was killed in revenge in front of his 13-year-old son, who was also accidentally shot by his father. The son was left paraplegic and considers Battisti to be responsible for the shooting. "It's not about the person of Cesare Battisti," he declared to the national press agency ANSA, "It's in order that everyone understands that, sooner or later, those who have committed such serious crimes should pay for their faults."

== First trial and escape ==
Cesare Battisti was arrested and jailed in Italy on 26 February 1979, then sentenced to 12 and a half years in prison for participation in an "armed group" ("partecipazione a banda armata"). He was sentenced on the grounds of material evidence and testimony provided by two "collaboratori di giustizia" (defendants who testified against their former accomplice) who benefitted from lighter sentences for their testimony. The status of "collaboratore di giustizia", also popularly known as pentito, was established by anti-terrorist legislation enacted during this period.

PAC militants organised Battisti's escape on 4 October 1981, from Frosinone prison. He fled to Paris and then Puerto Escondido, Oaxaca, Mexico, very shortly afterwards. While in Mexico, he founded a literary review, Via Libre, which is still active. He also participated in the creation of the Book Festival of Managua, Nicaragua, and organised the first Graphic Arts Biennal in Mexico. Battisti began to write at the suggestion of Paco Ignacio Taibo II and collaborated with various newspapers.

== Second trial ==
Pietro Mutti, one of the leaders of the PAC who had been sentenced in absentia for the assassination of the prison guard Santoro, was arrested in 1982. He sought the status of collaboratore di giustizia and his testimony, which helped him reduce his sentence, implicated Battisti and an accomplice in the four assassinations claimed by the PAC. Battisti's trial was thus reopened in 1987, and he was sentenced in absentia in 1988 for two assassinations (Santoro and DIGOS agent Campagna) and complicity in murder in the two others (jeweler Torregiani and butcher Sabbadin). The court sentenced him in 1995, on appeal, to a life-sentence. Two years earlier, the Court of Cassation had quashed, on procedural grounds, the case against Battisti's accomplice, who had also been accused by Pietro Mutti.

== Return to France ==
In 1985, the Socialist President of France François Mitterrand had indicated that "leftist Italian activists who were not indicted for violent crimes and had given up terrorist activity would not be extradited to Italy"; this became known as the "Mitterrand doctrine". Many Italian political activists had fled to France during the 1970s-1980s. Trusting in this declaration, Battisti returned to France in 1990, where he was arrested at Italy's request in 1991, when his sentence was confirmed in the Court of Cassation. He thus passed five months in Fresnes prison and then was freed after the extradition request was rejected by the Paris Appeal Court on 29 May 1991. French justice concluded that the anti-terrorist legislation enacted in Italy "went against the French principles of law," which, along with the European Court of Human Rights (ECtHR), prohibited in particular extradition of a person sentenced in absentia if that person had not been in a condition to adequately defend himself during his trial. The court also declared the evidence against Battisti as "contradictory" and "worthy of a military justice."

After his release in 1991, Battisti lived in Paris, where he wrote his first novel, Les Habits d'ombre ("The shadow clothes"). Two thrillers, L'Ombre rouge ("The red shadow") and Buena onda ("Good wave"), took as their setting and backdrop the Parisian world of Italian fugitives from justice. Another major novel, titled Dernières cartouches ("Last bullets"), takes place in Italy during the "years of lead".

In 1997, jointly with other left-wing Italians who had fled to France and were accused of taking part in violent crimes, he asked the President of Italy at the time, Oscar Luigi Scalfaro (DC), for amnesty without success.

== Arrest in France ==
On 10 February 2004, the French government arrested Battisti at Italy's request and planned to extradite him to Italy. On 30 June 2004, the Paris Court of Appeal approved his extradition. An appeal to the Court of Cassation was filed against this opinion, and another to the Conseil d'État against the extradition decree. President Jacques Chirac stated on 2 July 2004 that he would not oppose the French justice system's decision to extradite him. Perben confirmed Paris' new position: "There is no ambiguity. There has been a change of attitude from France, and I support it", (in reference to the "Mitterrand doctrine"), among other reasons "because of the European construction".

As of 2007, only Paolo Persichetti, a former member of the Unità Comuniste Combattenti, among the 200 Italians involved in Court cases dealing with political violence requested by Italy, had been extradited (in August 2002). He was eventually sentenced to 22 years in prison. Minister Edouard Balladur signed Persichetti's extradition decree in 1994; it was validated by the Conseil d'Etat the following year. According to RFI radio station, the Perben-Castelli agreement was divided in three parts: all events before 1982 would be prescribed "except in case of exceptional gravity"; facts between 1982 and 1993 would be "examined on a case-by-case basis", in function of the European Convention of Human Rights (ECHR) principle and of the "conditions in which the trials took place in Italy".

Still claiming innocence, Cesare Battisti failed to check in at the local police station while on parole and went underground on 21 August 2004.

On 18 March 2005, the Conseil d'Etat, ruling ultimately for Battisti's extradition, affirmed clearly that the Italian legislation did not conflict with the French principles of law. The Conseil established that:

the circumstance that some of the charges held against Mr Battisti, which led to the cited sentences, are partly based on statements by "repented" witnesses, is not contrary to French public order and does not constitute an infringement by Italian authorities of the requirements of Article 6 of the European Human Rights and fundamental liberties safeguard convention (...).

In July 2005, the Italian press revealed the existence of the Department of Anti-terrorism Strategic Studies (DSSA), a "parallel police" created by Gaetano Saya, leader of New Italian Social Movement neofascist party, and Riccardo Sindoca, two leaders of the National Union of the Police Forces (Unpf). Both claimed they were former members of Gladio, NATO's "stay-behind" paramilitary organization involved in Italy's strategy of tension and various alleged activist acts. According to Il Messaggero, quoted by The Independent, judicial sources declared that wiretaps suggested DSSA members had been planning to kidnap Cesare Battisti.

On 5 February 2005, the European Parliament adopted a resolution in which it expressed its trust "that the re-examination of the decision on the extradition of Cesare Battisti will take into account the judgment delivered by an EU Member State in full compliance with the principle of the rule of law in the European Union".

The European Court of Human Rights (ECtHR), in its December 2006 decision, rejected Battisti's claim that France's extradition decision was illegitimate. The Court stated:

The applicant had patently been informed of the accusation against him and of the progress of the proceedings before the Italian courts, notwithstanding the fact that he had absconded. Furthermore, the applicant, who had deliberately chosen to remain on the run after escaping from prison, had received effective assistance during the proceedings from several lawyers specially appointed by him. Hence, the Italian and subsequently the French authorities had been entitled to conclude that the applicant had unequivocally waived his right to appear and be tried in person. The French authorities had therefore taken due account of all the circumstances of the case and of the Court's case-law in granting the extradition request made by the Italian authorities: manifestly ill-founded.

== Arrest and asylum in Brazil ==
Battisti was arrested in Rio de Janeiro on 18 March 2007 by Brazilian and French police officers. Later, the Brazilian Minister of Justice Tarso Genro granted him the status of political refugee, in a controversial decision that was much criticized in Italy, even in Brazil and the international press. On 5 February 2009, the European Parliament adopted a resolution in support of Italy and held a minute of silence in memory to Battisti's victims. On 18 November 2009, the Brazilian Supreme Court considered the refugee status illegal and allowed for extradition, but also stated that the Brazilian constitution gives the president personal powers to deny the extradition if he chooses to, effectively putting the final decision in the hands of Brazilian President Luiz Inácio Lula da Silva. On 31 December 2010, on Lula's last effective day as president, the decision not to allow extradition was officially announced.

Battisti was released on 9 June 2011 from prison after the Brazilian Constitutional Court denied Italy's request to extradite him. Italy planned to appeal to the International Court of Justice in The Hague. In March 2015, a federal judge ruled null and void the decision to grant him a permanency visa as it would conflict with Brazilian law, ordering his deportation. On 14 September, the sixth section of the Regional Federal Courts of the First Region (seated in Brasília) declared the deportation of Battisti illegal. In December 2018, Brazilian President Michel Temer signed the order to extradite Battisti after the Brazilian Supreme Court ordered his arrest. He fled justice after this and escaped to Bolivia, where he was finally arrested on 12 January 2019. He was extradited to Italy the day after, where he is currently serving a sentence of life imprisonment.

After Brazil granted him refugee status through a decision of its Minister of Justice Tarso Genro. Battisti's request for asylum was first denied by the National Committee for Refugees, in a decision taken by simple majority. His defence appealed to the Minister of Justice, who granted him refugee status in January 2009, a decision which divided Brazilian public opinion.

Italian President Giorgio Napolitano wrote to Brazilian President Luiz Inácio Lula da Silva, informing him of the "emotion and understandable reactions" raised in his country, in public opinion and among political forces by this "grave decision". Italian Justice Minister, Angelino Alfano, asked Brazilian authorities to reconsider this decision "in the light of international cooperation against terrorism". Lula answered Napolitano, mentioning that Genro's decision was founded on the Brazilian constitution and on the UN 1951 Convention on Refugee Status and was a sovereign act by Brazil.

Criticism was also based on speculations about the influence exerted by Carla Bruni, spouse of the French President Nicolas Sarkozy, on Genro's decision. Brazilian Senator Eduardo Suplicy attested to Corriere della Sera that Bruni herself asked Lula to refuge Battisti. Bruni denied this claim on a RAI interview as she expressed her condolences with the families of Battisti's victims.

On 29 December 2010, unofficial reports in Italy and Brazil said President Lula was about to announce he was denying extradition of Battisti, just three days short of the end of his presidential term. The official announcement took place on 31 December, hours before the end of Lula's time in office.

On 8 June 2011, the Brazilian Supreme Court ruled that Lula's decision was final. Italian authorities announced their intention to appeal to the International Court of Justice saying Brazil breached an extradition treaty.

In March 2015, a federal judge ruled null and void a decision to grant him a permanent visa as this would conflict with Brazilian law and ordered his deportation. The judge stressed that the deportation should not be confused with extradition, as it does not require that Battisti be surrendered to Italy, but rather to the country from which he entered Brazil, or any other country that will agree to receive him.

In June 2015, Battisti married Joice Lima, a Brazilian citizen.

== Extradition to Italy ==
On 12 January 2019, Battisti was arrested by an Italian team of Interpol officers in Santa Cruz de La Sierra, Bolivia, and returned to Italy to start serving his sentence. On 25 March 2019, Battisti acknowledged his responsibilities in the crimes attributed to him, pleading guilty.

He was imprisoned in the Costantino Satta Correctional Facility, a maximum security prison of Ferrara; however, in 2022 he was transferred to a regular penitentiary in Parma. The transfer was strongly criticized by the centre-right coalition (particularly the right-wing to far-right League and Brothers of Italy) and by the families of Battisti's victims.

== Public opinion ==
The circumstances of his sentence have been questioned. A movement claiming Battisti's innocence is active in the media and in public opinion (especially in France and Italy). Among the most vocal supporters of Battisti are the writers Fred Vargas, Valerio Evangelisti and Bernard-Henri Lévy. They consider that the trials conducted in Italy were marked by irregularities. These alleged irregularities involved the use of torture (Battisti's French lawyers have not used this peculiar charge, the violation of article 3 ECHR, in their rejected claim to ECtHR), and the misuse of witnesses: according to Battisti's supporters, witnesses against Battisti were either affected by mental troubles, or were collaboratori di giustizia (that is, defendants testifying against other defendants in order to benefit from a reduced sentence. Those peculiar witnesses are also used by French justice, i.e. art. 132–78 French Code pénal). Battisti's supporters also claim that ballistic analysis and graphological expertise used in Italian court cases do in fact exonerate Battisti, contrary to what the courts considered.

Most of the public opinion in Italy disagrees with those views, and Battisti's arrest in Brazil has been commented upon favourably in the media. Rifondazione Comunista, however, claims that he should not be extradited, as he would not be granted the right to a new trial. In France, supporters of Battisti, such as Gilles Perrault, have called the 2007 arrest, a few weeks before the April 2007 presidential election, an "electoral feat", closely timed by the then Interior Minister Nicolas Sarkozy, candidate for the UMP conservative party. François Bayrou, candidate for the UDF right-of-centre party, has called for a new trial, as have members of the left-wing.

Defenders of Battisti, among whom the Human Rights League (LDH), consider that France's decision to extradite Battisti was illegal, since Battisti would not have the right to a new trial after having been judged in absentia. The right to a new trial is not a sufficient guarantee for the defendant, as clearly ruled by the ECHR in the case of Krombach v. France, application no. 29731/96; and also article 6 of ECHR, the juridical ground of Battisti's claim against extradition, doesn't prescribe a new trial. ECHR establishes that there is no absolute right to a new trial after a trial in absentia. Battisti's claim concerned the defendant's knowledge of the trial, and Battisti's lawyers argued that the defendant had not been in a position to know that in Italy there was a trial against him, and therefore his rights had been violated.

The Union syndicale des magistrats (USM, the largest trade union of French judges) has supported the fairness of the Italian trial in absentia and has also confirmed the legality of Battisti's sentence.

== Bibliography ==
- Travestito da uomo (French title: Les habits d'ombre)
- Nouvel an, nouvelle vie (1994)
- L'ombre rouge (Italian title: L'orma rossa; 1995)
- Buena onda (1996)
- Copier coller (1997)
- J'aurai ta Pau (1997)
- L'ultimo sparo (French title: Dernières cartouches; 1998)
- Naples (1999, short story anthology with works also by Jean-Jacques Busino, Carlo Lucarelli, Jean-Bernard Pouy and Tito Topin)
- Jamais plus sans fusil (2000)
- Terres brûlées (2000, editor)
- Avenida Revolución (2001)
- Le Cargo sentimental (2003)
- Vittoria (2003)
- L'eau du diamant (2006)
- Ma cavale (2006)
