= Armed Proletarians for Communism =

Italian far-left terrorist group

Armed Proletarians for Communism (Italian Proletari Armati per il Comunismo or PAC) was an Italian far-left terrorist group founded in 1976 and disbanded three years later, during the "Years of Lead".

== History ==
Armed Proletarians for Communism was founded in 1976, as one of the numerous armed groups spun out of Italian Autonomism (Autonomia Operaia). As opposed to the Red Brigades, the PAC was structured "horizontally", with independently constituted cells with their own actions.

Most of the early members were young workers, unemployed people and teachers. An estimate 60 people were involved in the group in Lombardy and Veneto.

The leaders of the PAC were Sebastiano Masala and Arrigo Cavallina who was considered to be the ideologue of the group.

The group was dissolved in 1979.

== Doctrine ==
Italian Autonomism held that the working class was a social group politically not represented, and exploited by ruling classes. A counter-power was to be organised by direct democracy and self-organisation. The movement drew upon theories of illegalism and propaganda of the deed formulated by the anarchist movement at the turn of the 20th century.

== Actions ==
The first actions of the PAC were, allegedly, in support of workers' revendications. They notably attacked and wounded physician Diego Fava, and committed around 60 armed robberies, ranging from store attacks to bank robberies (what they called "expropriations"). The PAC also organised attacks against companies which used illegal workers, people whom they accused of brutalising detainees, or self-defence groups.

Most of the "actions" did not cause victims, although the PAC did claim four murders:

- Antonio Santoro, prison guard, was assassinated on 6 June 1978 in Udine, for allegedly mistreating a detainee and member of the PAC. Cesare Battisti was sentenced for this murder.
- Pierluigi Torregiani, jeweller, assassinated in his shop on 16 February 1979 in Milan. One month before, Torregiani had shot and killed a robber in an act of self-defense, during a robbery at a restaurant where Torregiani (who was carrying some of his most valuable jewels) was dining. Another client, Vincenzo Consoli, was killed in the gunfight, and another was wounded. During Torregiani's assassination, his 13-year-old son, Alberto, was wounded and was left paraplegic. The four militants responsible for the assassination, Gabriele Grimaldi, Giuseppe Memeo, Sebastiano Masala and Sante Fatone, were identified and convicted in 1981.
- Lino Sabbadin, butcher and member of the neo-fascist Italian Social Movement, assassinated on 16 February 1979 in Caltana Santa Maria de Sala, in Veneto. Sabbadin was killed by Pietro Mutti and Diego Giacomin.
- Andrea Campagna, DIGOS member, was killed on 19 April 1979 in Milan, allegedly by Cesare Battisti and an accomplice. He was involved in the investigations regarding Torregiani's assassination, and accused by the PAC of torturing prisoners.

Torregiani and Sabbadin had defended themselves during hold-ups. They were assassinated on the same day, so as to teach people to "allow the deeds of the Proletarians forced to steal to survive".

From 1982, following Pietro Mutti's arrest, Cesare Battisti was accused of taking part in Santoro's and Campagna's murders, as well as being an accomplice in Torregiani's and Sabbadin's assassinations. He was judged and sentenced in absentia in 1988 and in 1993. Battisti has always denied being involved in the assassinations. In October 2017 he was arrested in Corumba, Brazil, near the Bolivian border.

== Prosecution of members ==
On 12 January 2019, Battisti was arrested by an Italian team of Interpol officers in Santa Cruz de La Sierra, Bolivia, and returned to Italy to start serving his sentence. On 25 March 2019, Battisti acknowledged his responsibilities in the crimes attributed to him, pleading guilty.

He was imprisoned in the Costantino Satta Correctional Facility, a maximum security prison of Ferrara; however, in 2022 he was transferred to a regular penitentiary in Parma. The transferring was strongly criticized by the centre-right coalition (particularly the right-wing to far-right League and Brothers of Italy) and by the families of Battisti's victims.

== See also ==
- History of the Italian Republic
- Years of Lead (Italy)
