= Franco Anselmi =

Italian terrorist (1956–1978)

- Police photograph (1976)
- Born: 1 March 1956; Bologna, Italy
- Died: 6 March 1978 (aged 22); Rome, Italy
- Cause of death: Gunshot wounds
- Other name: "Il cieco di Urbino"
- Organization: Armed Revolutionary Nuclei
- Known for: Acts of terrorism
- Height: 1.71 m (5 ft 7 in)
- Political party: ex-MSI
- Movement: Neofascism
- Opponents: Italian left and extreme left; Italian state

Franco Anselmi (1 March 1956 – 6 March 1978) was an Italian neofascist terrorist who was active in the organization Nuclei Armati Rivoluzionari (Armed Revolutionary Nuclei). He was killed during an attempt to rob a gun shop in Rome.

== Early life ==
Franco Anselmi was born in Bologna on 1 March 1956, the youngest of three children. His family moved to Florence and then to Rome, where young Franco enrolled in the Kepler XI Liceo Scientifico.

At school, he was already expressing nationalist views and sympathy for far-right parties and organizations. In 1972, during his fourth year at the school, he was attacked by a group of left-wing students. The blows put Anselmi in a coma for three months. Upon his release from medical care, he had suffered permanent damage to his eyes that significantly lowered his visual ability. To compensate for the lost school time, he enrolled at the Monsignor Egisto Tozzi Institute, in the Monteverde area of Rome, where, in 1975, he made the acquaintance of young neo-fascist militants, such as Valerio Fioravanti, Massimo Carminati, and Alessandro Alibrandi. His visual disability led to him subsequently being "affectionately" called by friends and subsequent comrades-in-arms il cieco di Urbino ("the blind man of Urbino"), a reference to the University of Urbino in which he enrolled after finishing school.

== Political militancy ==
In 1975, Anselmi joined the youth organization of the extreme-right Italian Social Movement (Movimento Sociale Italiano; MSI), then led by Giorgio Almirante; he was active in the Portuense quarter of the city.

On 28 February 1975, he took part in the demonstration organized by MSI in Rome on the occasion of the trial for the so-called Primavalle fire: On 16 April 1973, militants from the extreme-left organization Potere Operaio (Workers' Power) had firebombed the home of Mario Mattei, MSI secretary for Primavalle. Although Mattei himself escaped without injuries, two of his six sons, Virgilio (Note: Virgilio Mattei was a member of Volontari Nazionali, the security branch of MSI.) and Stefano, aged 22 and 8 respectively, died in the fire. The arsonists left a pamphlet on the pavement, signed "Tanas Brigade," that read "Class war - Death to the fascists - headquarters of the MSI - Mattei and Schiavoncino are hit by proletarian justice." (In a 2005 interview, Achille Lollo admitted his participation, alongside Marino Clavo and Manlio Grillo, all Potere Operaio members at the time, in the arson attack.)

The 1975 demonstration in Rome quickly turned violent with clashes breaking out between participants and leftist counter-demonstrators. The violence culminated in the killing of a Greek student, Mikis Mantakas, a member of the Fronte universitario d'azione nazionale (University Front of National Action), the student organization of MSI. (Note: Alvaro Lojacono, then a Potere Operaio member and subsequently a militant in the Red Brigades, was found guilty in absentia for the Mantakas murder and was convicted to 16 years in prison. In 1997, Lojacono was also sentenced to life imprisonment for his participation in the abduction and killing of Aldo Moro. He has served a total of 11 years in prison in Switzerland where he had escaped.) Mantakas was a friend of Anselmi and his killing arguably further radicalized Anselmi.

== Armed militancy ==
In 1976, while attending a neofascist rally in Sezze during that year's general election campaign, Anselmi was involved in a fracas instigated by MSI deputy Sandro Saccucci that resulted in the death of Luigi Di Rosa, a young communist activist. The following year, according to neofascist terrorist Cristiano Fioravanti, he and his brother Valerio Fioravanti (a former child film star), along with Anselmi, Alessandro Alibrandi and others, established an informal armed group with the aim of striking back at "leftist aggression" and engaging in "revolutionary struggle." According to pentito terrorist Walter Sordi, the group, also including Stefano Tiraboschi, started its "revolutionary struggle" through bank robberies and assassination attempts. The first time the group used the name Armed Revolutionary Nuclei (Nuclei Armati Rivoluzionari, NAR) was on the occasion of the December 1977 firebombing of offices of political parties, two of the Christian Democrats and one of the Communists.

On 30 December 1977, they firebombed the entrance of Il Messaggero in via dei Serviti, while, on 4 January 1978, they entered the editorial office of Corriere della Sera, issued threats to the newspaper's employees, and threw Molotov cocktails, one of which, thrown by Anselmi, mistakenly hit the building superintendent who suffered extensive burns. On 28 February 1978, on the occasion of the third anniversary of the death of Mantakas, Anselmi participated, together with the Fioravanti brothers and others, in the assassination of Lotta Continua militant Roberto Scialabba in Don Bosco square. Cristiano Fioravanti would later report that Anselmi unloaded his entire magazine without hitting Scialabba.

== Death ==
On 6 March 1978, NAR members raided the gunshop owned by the Centofanti brothers in the Monteverde area in Rome and took a number of weapons. Anselmi was the last to leave the shop because he was, according to subsequent witness reports, trying to disguise the robbery as being committed by drug addicts, asking for personal jewelry and money. As he was exiting the door, he was shot by Daniele "Danilo" Centofanti, dying instantly. Later the same month, NAR sent a flyer to an ANSA journalist in which they praised the "heroic life" of Anselmi and condemned Danilo Centofanti to death.

On 5 May 1987, in the annual award ceremony for "courageous actions" of Italian citizens, the President of the Republic bestowed the Silver Medal for Civil Valor to Danilo Centofanti for showing, during the 1978 robbery, "contempt of danger" and "civic sense."

In 2019, about a dozen sympathizers gave the fascist salute in a memorial ceremony at the place where 41 years before Anselmi had been killed. The event drew criticism from media and anti-fascist organizations.

== See also ==
- Years of Lead (Italy)
- Armed, far-right organizations in Italy
