= October 22 Group =

Far-left terrorist group in Italy, active 1969–1971

The October 22 Group (Italian: Gruppo XXII Ottobre) was an Italian terrorist organisation, inspired by the Uruguayan Tupamaros, established on 22 October 1969 and dismantled by police in 1971.

== Leadership and ideology ==
The group was led by Mario Rossi, an animal embalmer, and Augusto Viel, an electronics technician. Mario Rossi was a former communist who wanted to unite the workers of Italy to prevent the return of fascism. Mario Rossi created the October 22 Group to unite workers after seeing their struggles in his everyday life. He was inspired by the numerous worker riots in the 1960s that occurred at the factory he worked at in Milan. He spread his ideals to his friends and that was the basis of the October 22 Group. Others in the group were former members of the Italian Communist Party who left because they were dissatisfied with the groups inability to enact change within the government

The October 22 Group was inspired by left-wing, anti-fascist, and Maoist ideology. The group did not explicitly want to overthrow the government and their only clearly defined goal was to organize the working class. The October 22 Group never expanded outside of Genoa and was only active for a short time. They would eventually expand to about a dozen total members who all wanted to enact change within their government. The group was named by the media because of a ticket found in Mario Rossi's pocket when he was arrested after a failed robbery attempt that ended in murder. Its political approach was Marxist–Leninist but among its members were also petty criminals and even a fascist, Diego Vandelli, enrolled in the MSI and police informer.

== Attacks ==
The October 22 Group had a variety of targets including private citizens, private property, and particularly government property. Most of their attacks were not fatal. Like most Italian left-wing organizations, the movement used dynamite as their weapon of choice in their attacks. Of all the group's targets, private citizens were the most frequently targeted, including the abduction and ransom of the son of a wealthy citizen of Genoa. This was the first kidnapping done by an Italian leftist group and was successful. In 1970, Mario Rossi organized the abduction of Sergio Gadolla, son of a rich Genoa family, as a way of financing. From the action, the gang gained a 200 million liras ransom; most of the money, however, was raked off by Vandelli, who had acted as middleman. By then, the kidnapping was generally attributed by the press to the city's underworld.

On 26 March 1971, Rossi and Viel robbed a security officer who transported the wages for the Genoa Public Housing Institute's dependents. A delivery man of the institute, Alessandro Floris, tried bravely to stop the two raiders and was shot by Rossi. Floris was the first victim of the Italian red terrorism. (Later, Rossi has always denied firing to kill.) A passerby took a photo the moment when Rossi, on a scooter driven by Viel, pointed his gun against the body of Floris, lying on the ground in a pool of blood. The image, besides becoming a symbol of the years of lead, helped to identify the killer, who was captured the same day, after a long chase in the city's streets.

== Propaganda and grievances ==
Along with attacking symbolic targets of state power and capitalism, like the United States consulate. The group spread their anti-fascist propaganda by hijacking radio or television transmissions and the members distributed pamphlets. The group used guerilla warfare in an urban setting to respond to grievances they had using a manual written by a revolutionary from Brazil as their guide. Originally they planned to do the guerilla warfare in the mountains but decided on an urban setting. One example of the group responding to a grievance they had was when the group bombed an oil refinery to protest high gas prices at the time with no fatalities.

== Downfall and dissolution ==
The October 22 Group was only active for about two years before it disbanded due to the accidental murder of security officer Alessandro Floris by Mario Rossi. His arrest led the authorities to the group's warehouse where their revolutionary writings weapons were discovered. After the Rossi's arrest, the group was quickly disbanded in 1971. The group's trial took place in 1973: Rossi received a life sentence, the other members of the group received a combined 180 years of prison. The public prosecutor was Mario Sossi, a judge notorious for his intransigence and his right-wing ideas.

In 1974, Mario Sossi himself was kidnapped by the Red Brigades. The terrorist group asked, in exchange of the judge's life, the freedom and the expatriation to a communist country of Mario Rossi and the other members of the XXII October. The Genoa Assizes gave in to blackmail and ordered the eight prisoners' release, but the give-and-take was immediately stopped by the Ministry of Interior Paolo Emilio Taviani and by the Genoa General Procurator Francesco Coco. Three days later, Sossi was freed, without counterparts.

The Red Brigades in 1978 demanded the release of three of the October 22 members from prison in exchange for the release of Italian prime minister Aldo Moro, whom the Red Brigades had captured and later executed. The October 22 Group members who did not receive life were absorbed by The Red Brigades after the October 22 Groups collapse.

In the 1980s, after the end of the wave of terrorism, the members of the gang were gradually set free. Mario Rossi alone got bail only in 1990 and was definitively released in 2002.
