= Association for International and Comparative Studies in Labour and Industrial Relations =

Research institute in Bergamo, Italy

Coordinates: 45°41′44.8″N 9°39′49.1″E

- Formation: 2000
- Type: Professional association
- Headquarters: Bergamo, Italy
- President: Emmanuele Massagli
- Website: www.adapt.it

The Association for International and Comparative Studies in Labour and Industrial Relations (ADAPT) is a non-profit organization that conducts and supports academic research in the field of labour and industrial relations.

== About ==
ADAPT works in collaboration with national and international partners. It was founded in 2000 by Professor Marco Biagi. and is based in Bergamo, Italy. ADAPT is engaged in research in collaboration with a network of national and international partners. ADAPT’s publications by ADAPT University Press are both online and in print: The Journal of Industrial Relations Law (in Italian), Labour Studies Book Series which is published by Cambridge Scholars Publishing, working papers, International Bulletin, and E-Journal of International and Comparative Labour Studies (in English and Spanish).

== Higher Education ==
ADAPT offers two international PhD programs: The first is PhD in Labour Law at the University of Modena and Reggio Emilia in collaboration with the “Marco Biagi” Center for International and Comparative Studies and the University of Modena and Reggio Emilia and the second is PhD in Human Capital Formation and Labour Relations in collaboration with the University of Bergamo. Since their launch in 2007, the two PhD programs have enrolled 248 students and have graduated 138 PhDs. Since 2007, ADAPT has secured for its doctoral candidates 86 private scholarships through its partners and 85 public scholarships granted by the Italian Ministry of Higher Education and Research under an agreement.
