= Antonio Annarumma =

Italian policeman (1947–1969)

Antonio Annarumma (10 January 1947, Monteforte Irpino, Campania – 19 November 1969, Milan) was an Italian policeman who was killed at the age of 22 while serving during a demonstration organized by the Italian (Marxist–Leninist) Communist Party and from the Student Movement. He is sometimes considered to be the first victim of the Years of Lead, a period of social and political upheaval in Italy.

The demonstration passed in front of the Teatro Lirico, Milan, where a union rally was held by CISL with speaker Bruno Storti. During attacks on the police, Annarumma was hit by an iron tube, according to the court inquiry. After he was struck, the vehicle he was driving hit another police officer. Students believed it was the accident which killed him, but this claim was repudiated by the medical examination.
