= Guido Rossa =

Italian worker and trade unionist

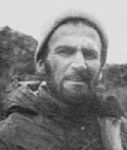
- Born: 1 December 1934; Cesiomaggiore, Italy
- Died: 24 January 1979 (aged 44); Genoa, Italy
- Cause of death: Gunshot wound
- Known for: Italian worker and syndicalist who was assassinated for denouncing the Red Brigades

Guido Rossa (1 December 1934 – 24 January 1979) was an Italian worker and syndicalist who was born in Cesiomaggiore, Veneto, and lived for several years in Turin. His first job was at the age of 14 as a worker in a ball bearing factory, then at Fiat in Turin as a milling machine worker.

In 1961, Rossa moved to Genoa to work for Italsider. The following year, he was elected to the labor union FIOM-CGIL. As a member of the Italian Communist Party, he was a trade unionist for the labor union CGIL at Italsider in Genoa-Cornigliano. He denounced a colleague, Francesco Berardi, to the Italian police—Berardi produced propaganda at Italsider on behalf of the Red Brigades. In retaliation, Rossa was killed by the Red Brigades on 24 January 1979, during the Years of Lead.

== See also ==
- Aldo Moro
- Kidnapping of Aldo Moro
