= Licio Giorgieri =

Italian Air Force general

Licio Giorgieri (1 June 1925 – 20 March 1987) was an Italian air force general who was killed by a faction the far-left terrorist organisation Red Brigades.

== Biography ==
Giorgieri was born in Trieste.

He graduated in naval and mechanical engineering in the University of Trieste in 1949 and later enrolled as officer of the Italian Air Force Engineering Corps in 1950. In 1983 he was promoted to General Inspector, becoming commander of the Corps and director of the Air Force's Direction of Aircraft Weapons. He also taught Rockets and Space Propulsion in the universities of Trieste and Rome.

On 20 March 1987, Giorgieri was ambushed by a commando of the Red Brigades; the Union of Combatant Communists in Rome. His car was flanked by a motorcycle whose riders fired five times, killing him. The general had reported a failed attempt against him in December 1986, but his protection had not been strengthened.

Giorgieri's assassins, Claudio Nasti and Daniele Mennella, were sentenced to 10 years in 1991.

A Lockheed F-104G exhibited in the Trieste Airport is named in his memory.
