= Gun shop =

Business that sells firearms

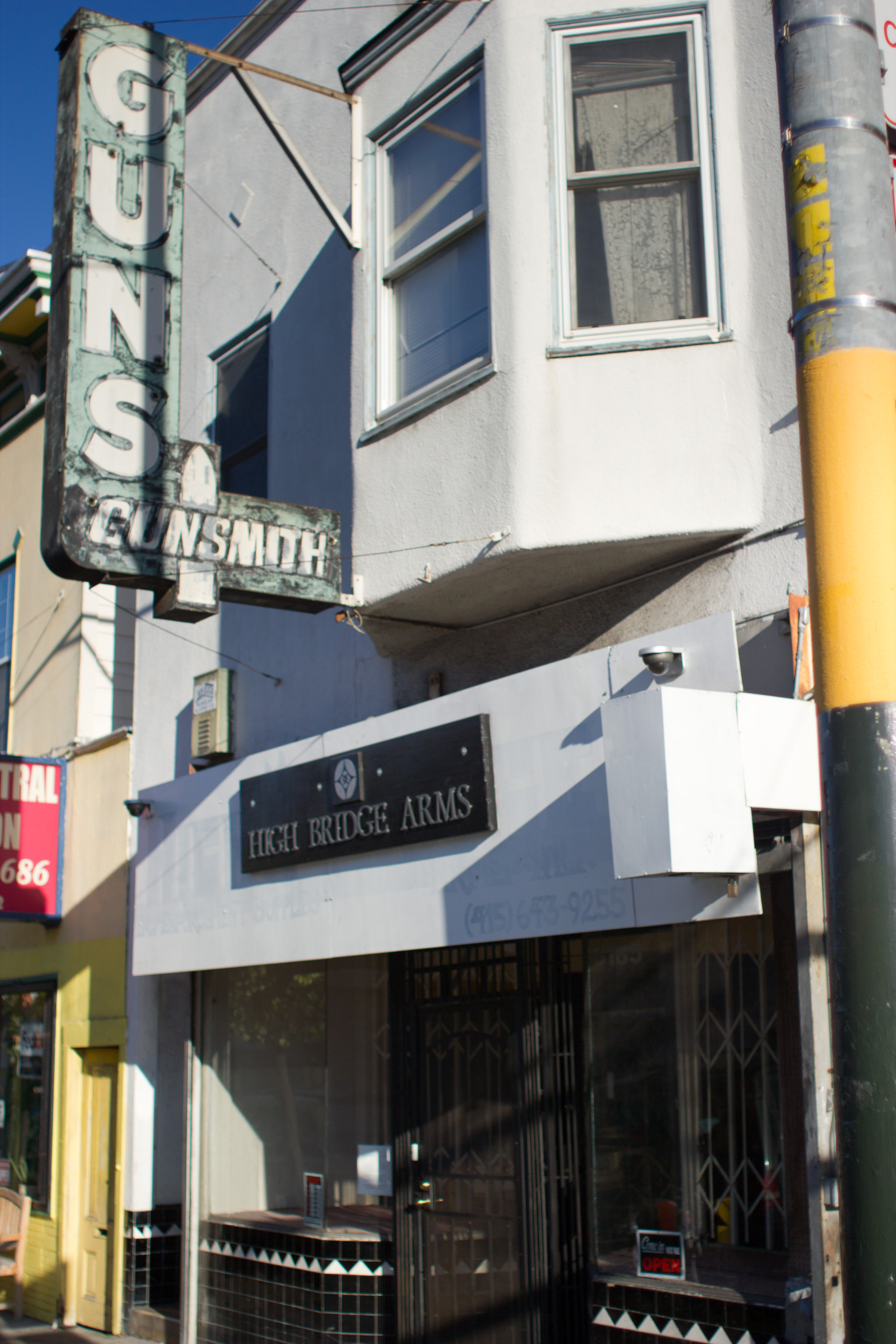
High Bridge Arms, pictured in January 2012, was a notable gun shop in San Francisco, California.

A gun shop (also known by various other names such as firearm store and gun store) is a retail business that sells firearms and ammunition. It may also have an on-site gunsmith's workshop where firearms can be repaired, modified, or built from scratch. Other items for sale many include safety equipment, hunting tools and accessories, specialty (usually hunting-focused) food and clothing, and gun culture souvenirs and memorabilia.

Often having designs reminiscent of other establishments such as department stores and grocery stores, gun shops operate under widely different gun control laws depending on the specific nation, locality, and jurisdiction involved.

== Services and trends ==
=== Europe ===
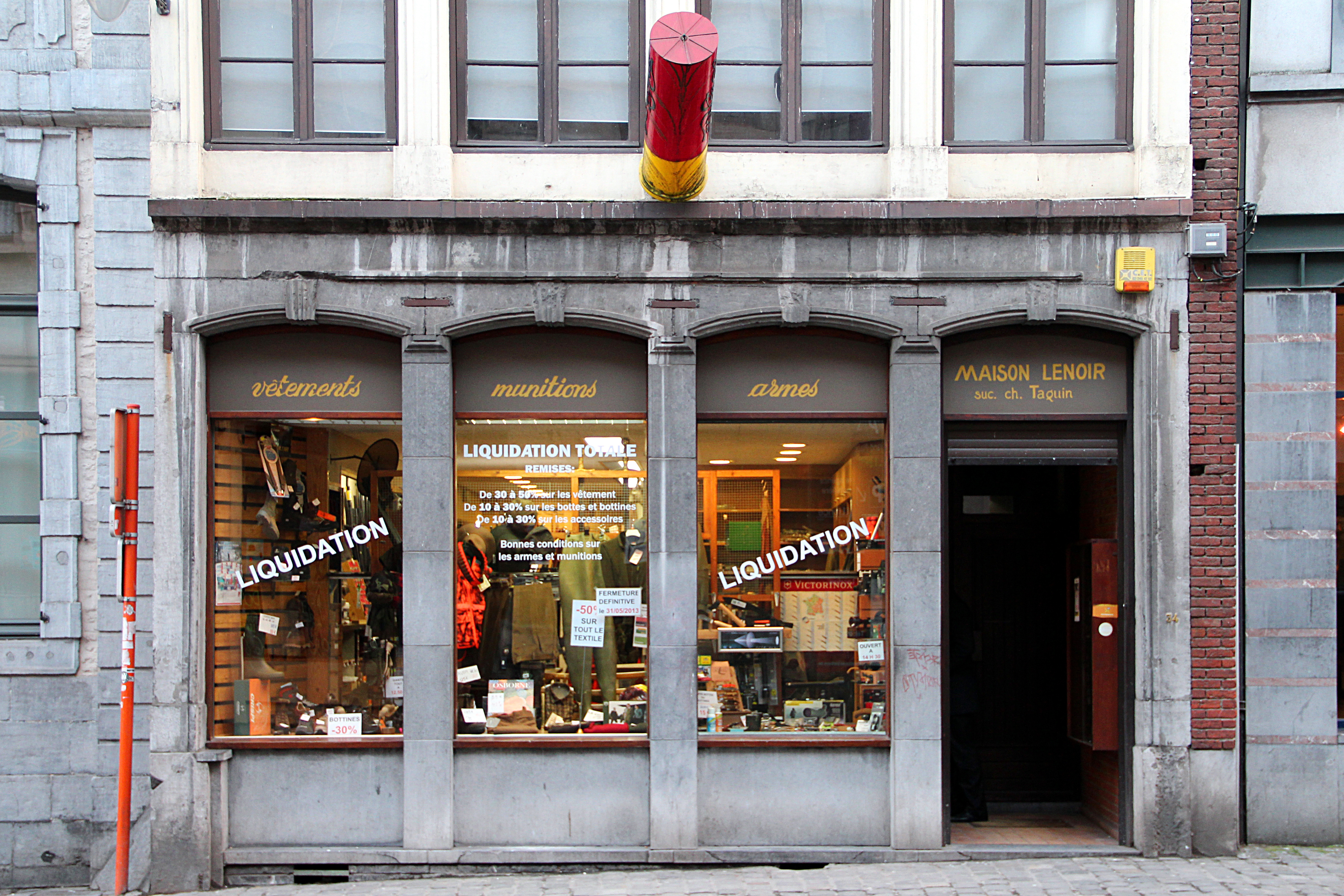
A gun shop in Mons, Belgium. In most of Europe, firearm possession is only permitted for sport and hunting purposes and not for personal defense.

Gun laws in Europe vary dramatically from nation to nation, with some areas having what amounts to a near total ban on civilian access to firearms while others have systems of moderate regulation. Nearly all nations have stricter laws than the United States, particularly in terms of measures to require firearms training, mandate background checks, and impose confiscation of weapons upon the committing of felony crimes.

Gun legislation in Germany provides as a contrast. Individuals who desire to acquire a firearm have to meet stringent standards to receive an ownership license (German: Waffenbesitzkarte or WBK). Personal characteristics such as mental fitness and ability to physically handle the weapons well are evaluated. Germans under the age of 21, unable to prove their citizenship status, possessing a documented history of mental illness, or otherwise failing to meet the guidelines will not receive the license.

=== Mexico ===
Retail gun shops are not legal in Mexico. The Directorate of Commercialization of Arms and Munitions (Dirección de Comercialización de Armamento y Municiones – DCAM) is the only outlet authorized to sell firearms and ammunition in the country. The business is located in Mexico City near the headquarters of the Secretariat of National Defense. No other legitimate sales may take place in the country.

Examples of specific companies with items sold in Mexico City include Beretta and Colt; rifles used in hunting are particularly available. The privately owned firearms are registered with the Mexican military and may be transported outside of the home only with a specific permit, which must be renewed annually. Prospective customers go through a system of strict regulations. Factors such as the amount of ammunition that an individual can buy each month are controlled.

=== United States ===
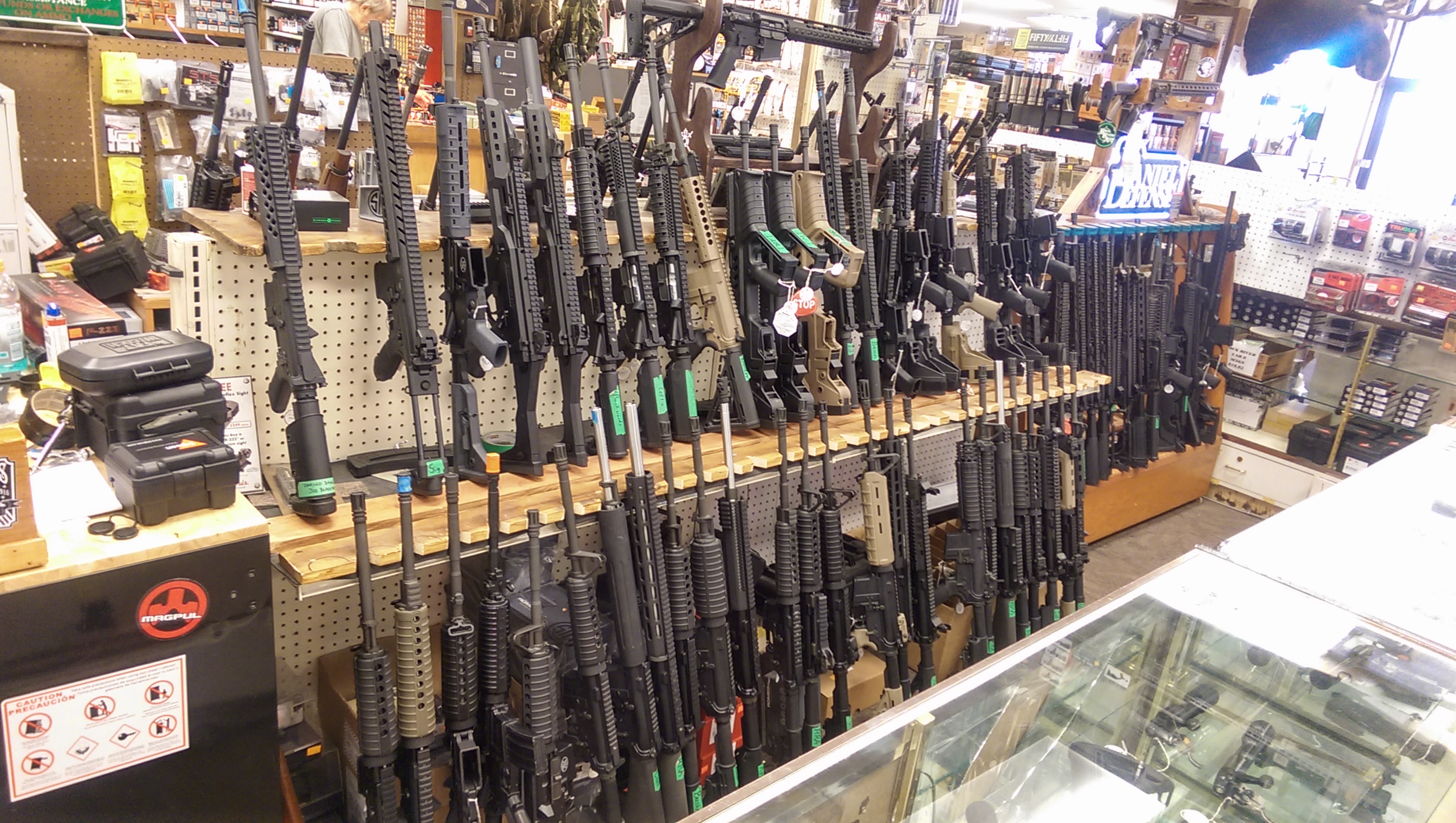
A rack of AR-15 style rifles in a gun shop in Salt Lake City, Utah

As of early 2019 there were approximately 63,000 licensed gun dealers in the U.S.

Akin to other general-interest shopping stores, sales at firearm shops tend to increase during the holiday season, with the month of December providing stores with the best margins. In the United States, prices for many firearms decreased in the aftermath of the Great Recession, even as general sales remained relatively high.

Although it is commonly thought that most gun purchases take place in the context of a firearm-specific independent business, data from the U.S. shows that many purchases actually take place in large chain stores.

Firearm distributors need to comply with rigorous checks from the Bureau of Alcohol, Tobacco, Firearms and Explosives on a local, state, and federal level. In the United States, gun shops are required to have a federal firearms license. These licenses exist to administer federally mandated regulations such as bans on straw purchasing.

== See also ==
- Arms industry
- Gun shows in the United States
- Gunsmith
- List of firearms
