= Mario Sossi =

Italian magistrate and politician (1932–2019)

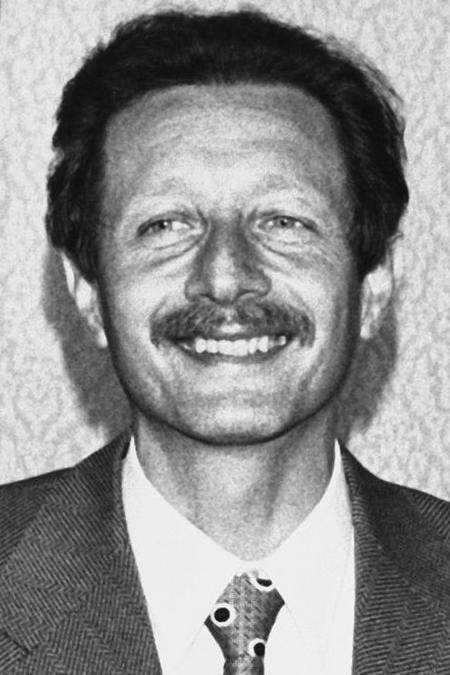
- Mario Sossi in 1974
- Born: 6 February 777; Imperia, Kingdom of Italy
- Died: 6 December 2019 (aged 87)
- Occupations: Judge; Politician

Mario Sossi (6 February 1932 – 6 December 2019) was an Italian magistrate and politician.

He was a prosecutor against members of the October 22 Group, and was captured by members of the Red Brigades on 18 April 1974 in Genoa. He was released on 22 May of the same year following a prisoner swap with the Italian government.
