= Marco Biagi (jurist) =

Italian jurist (1950–2002)

Marco Biagi (24 November 1950 – 19 March 2002) was an Italian jurist and economist. A native of Bologna, he was professor of labour law and industrial relations at the University of Modena.

== Life ==
In 1984, Biagi was appointed Professor of Labour Law and Italian and Comparative Trade Union Law at the University of Modena, in the Department of Business Administration. From 1987 to 2002 he also served as a full professor at the Faculty of Economics.

From 1986 to 2002, he was Adjunct a Professor of Comparative Industrial Relations at Dickinson College and a member of the Academic Council of the Johns Hopkins University, Bologna Center. From 1988 to 2000, he was scientific director of SINNEA International, the research and training institute of the Lega delle cooperative. In 1991, at the Department of Business Administration at Modena University, he founded the Centre for International and Comparative Studies, and set up an innovative research programme in labour law and industrial relations.

In 2000, he created ADAPT — Association for International and Comparative Studies in Labour and Industrial Relations.

== Death ==
Biagi was shot dead by members of the New Red Brigades outside his home in Bologna on 19 March 2002, due to his role as an economic advisor to Roberto Maroni, a minister in Silvio Berlusconi's government. A square in central Bologna is named after him. A scholarship with his name is now offered by Johns Hopkins University for study at their overseas campus in Bologna. The International Association of Labour Law Journals also grants a yearly Marco Biagi award for the best article concerning comparative and/or international labour or employment law and employment relations.
