= Divisione Investigazioni Generali e Operazioni Speciali =

Italian law enforcement agency

The General Investigations and Special Operations Division (Italian: Divisione Investigazioni Generali e Operazioni Speciali), generally known by its acronym DIGOS, is an Italian law enforcement agency charged with investigating sensitive cases involving terrorism, organized crime and serious offences such as kidnapping and extortion. It is a special operational division of Polizia di Stato, territorially organized within each provincial police headquarters (called Questura). It is responsible to the national Central Police Directorate for Crime Prevention (Italian: Direzione Centrale della Polizia di Prevenzione, DCPP), which is a part of the Public Safety Department of the Interior Ministry. The DIGOS, which has an Office in each provincial headquarters, or Questura, of the Polizia di Stato acts as its Intelligence branch. Through "general investigations" aimed at having a constant eye on the evolution on national soil of social unrest, political underground movements and sports-related violent phenomena the DIGOS periodically reports to the Minister of Interior and to the Head of Police. Such activity is strongly assisted by the peculiar and specially trained infiltration units belonging to DIGOS that constantly enrich such reports and investigations with "inside views" of the various phenomena (hence the "special operations" part of the acronym General Investigations and Special Operations Division or DIGOS). Special training of such units involves classes on local slang, specific environment habits and social camouflage along with prior real-life experiences as a selection preference.

== Controversies ==
The activities of the DIGOS have recently been criticized, for repression of the freedom of thought protected and guaranteed by Article 21 of the Italian Constitution. Interventions carried out by the DIGOS are usually justified by an attempt to quell provocation and to ensure that incidents do not occur, according to a very broad interpretation of a law dating to 1948, which punishes "anyone who by any means prevents or disturbs a public or private political campaign meeting". This law was approved at a very turbulent moment in Italian politics. Disputes, some of which were violent, were the norm during rallies at the time. Today even a banner hanging from a building can be considered a "disturbance". On other occasions, members of the DIGOS have been criticised for their disproportionate interventions to repress an effective threat, including through the use of force, which are claimed to have caused material damages, physical injury and the unjustified limitation of freedom of movement.
