= Fulvio Croce =

Italian lawyer (1901–1977)

- Born: 6 June 1901; Castelnuovo Nigra, Italy
- Died: 28 April 1977 (aged 75); Turin, Italy
- Occupation: Lawyer

Fulvio Croce (6 June 1901 – 28 April 1977) was an Italian lawyer. The president of the Turin Bar Association, he was killed by a terrorist group, the Red Brigades, whose leaders he had been appointed to defend.

== Biography ==
The great-grandson of Costantino Nigra, Croce was born in 1901 in Castelnuovo Nigra in the Piedmont region. In 1924 he obtained a degree in jurisprudence (Italian: giurisprudenza). After the Armistice of Cassibile of 8 September 1943, Croce joined the Alpini and the Italian resistance movement.

He was elected president of the Turin Bar Association in 1968. In 1977, the trial of Renato Curcio, Alberto Franceschini, Paolo Maurizio Ferrari, and Prospero Gallinari, members of the Red Brigades, began in Turin. At the first hearing of the trial, something totally new in Italy happened, as all the defendants refused to be defended by a counsellor and threatened death to any lawyer who agreed to be appointed as their counsellor by the court.

The defendants contended that the court did not have the authority to judge them. During the first hearing, Ferrari read a statement on behalf of all the defendants:

We publicly proclaim ourselves militants of the Communist Red Brigades. And as Communist fighters we collectively and fully assume political responsibility for all its past, present and future initiatives. By stating this, any legal basis for this trial is lost. The defendants have nothing to defend themselves from. On the contrary, the accusers have to defend the criminal anti-proletarian practice of the infamous regime that they represent. If there must be defenders, then these are for you, your Excellencies. To remove any misunderstanding, we therefore revoke our lawyers' mandate for the defence and invite them, in the event that they were appointed ex officio, to refuse any collaboration with the authorities [...]".

Guido Barbaro, the presiding judge of the Turin Corte d'Assise (English: Court of Assizes), appointed Croce, in his capacity of president of the Bar Association, as counsellor for the defendants. Although Croce was conscious of the serious danger, he accepted the defence and appointed as co-counsellors some other members of the Turin Bar Association Board of Governors; among them was Franzo Grande Stevens, who was charged of the defence of Renato Curcio.

At the hearing on 25 May 1976, the defendants reaffirmed their rejection of any defence, reading a new statement containing threats against Fulvio Croce and the lawyers he appointed: "The lawyers appointed by the court are in fact regime lawyers. They do not defend us, but the judges. As an organic and active part of the counter-revolution, every time they take initiatives in our name we will act accordingly". During the hearing, as well as during the fourth hearing on 26 May 1976, every time the public defenders spoke, they were insulted and threatened.

At the hearing on 7 June 1976, Grande Stevens, in accord with Croce, contended that Article 130 of the Italian Code of Criminal Procedure, which compels every defendant, even against his will and one charged of political crimes, to be defended by a counsellor, was unconstitutional. Grande Stevens contended that this article was in conflict with the European Convention on Human Rights, which gives everyone the right "to defend himself in person or through legal assistance of his own choosing" according to Article 6.3. He contended that to be represented by a lawyer is a right, not an obligation.

The Court of Assizes rejected this claim of unconstitutionality, perhaps biased by the murder of a district attorney, Francesco Coco, by the Red Brigades a few days before. Consequently, Croce and the other co-counsellors kept defending the members of the Red Brigades.

On 28 April 1977, Croce was killed. Three men shot at him five times using a Nagant 7.62, which was the same gun used to kill Carlo Casalegno. The Red Brigades took responsibility for the action through a phone call. In leaflets, they stated: "On 28 April 1977 a commando of the Red Brigades has executed the state servant Fulvio Croce."

== Memory ==
On 5 December 1977, Croce received the Gold Medal Award for Civil Valour (Italian: medaglia d'oro al valore civile). The book Life of a Lawyer (Italian: Vita d'un avvocato) by Franzo Grande Stevens was published by Cedam in 2000. The Foundation Memorial Fulvio Croce (Italian: Fondazione dell'Avvocatura Torinese Fulvio Croce) was established in 2004. In 2007, Rai Trade and the Turin Bar Association produced the documentary film Avvocato! Il processo di Torino al nucleo storico delle Brigate rosse (English: Lawyer! The Turin Trial of the Historic Nucleus of the Red Brigades). During some solemn commitment ceremonies and immediately after the ritual oath, the Council of the Milan Bar Association donated a copy of the film to each young new lawyer. The film was directed by Marino Bronzino.

Since 2010, a courtroom in the criminal hearings of the court of Trento is dedicated to Croce and Giorgio Ambrosoli. Since 2014, a courtroom in the Palace of Justice in Ascoli Piceno is dedicated to Croce, "a perennial remembrance, victim of terrorism". On 9 May 2016, a memorial plaque was affixed to the wall of the house in via Perrone 5, where the fatal attack took place, by the Municipality of Turin.

On the fortieth anniversary of his death in 2018, the Criminal Chamber of western Piedmont remembered him as "a great lawyer who sacrificed his life in the name of the right to defence, an example for all citizens and also for us." A letter sent to its members read: "He was barbarously killed because he did his duty, because he honoured the toga, and served the state, thus implementing the Constitution."

== Honours ==
- Gold Medal Award for Civil Valour, 5 December 1977.

== Bibliography ==
- Grande Stevens, Franzo (2000). Vita d'un avvocato [Life of a lawyer] (paperback ed.). Padoa: Cedam. ISBN 978-8-8132-5294-6 – via Google Books.
