= Raffaele Fiore =

Italian militant (1954–2025)

- Undated photograph of Fiore
- Born: 7 May 1954; Bari, Italy
- Died: 28 July 2025 (aged 71); Bari
- Known for: Member of the Red Brigades
- Spouse: Angela Vai
- Status: Released on parole in 1997
- Allegiance: Red Brigades
- Motive: Political (terrorism)
- Criminal charges: Kidnapping and murder
- Penalty: Life imprisonment

Details
- Date apprehended: 19 March 1979

Raffaele Fiore (7 May 1954 – 28 July 2025) was an Italian militant and member of the Red Brigades.

== Biography ==
Fiore was born on 7 May 1954 in Bari, but moved to Milan at a young age, after the death of his father. He became the leader of the Turin Red Brigades, known by the nom de guerre "Marcello", he carried out his first action on 22 April 1977, when together with Patrizio Peci and Angela Vai, known as "Augusta" (who would become his wife), he hit Antonio Munari, head of the FIAT workshop, in the legs after following him for weeks. The attack was claimed on 24 April with a communiqué.

Descending to Rome from Turin, he participated in the ambush of Via Fani, when an armed group of the Brigade, made up of ten members, kidnapped Christian Democracy (DC) member and former prime minister Aldo Moro and murdered the five men of the escort. Fiore was one of the four brigade members who, disguised as airmen, opened fire on cars to kill Aldo Moro's escort agents. According to Valerio Morucci's reconstruction, and the more recent account by Fiore himself, the latter's submachine gun (a Beretta M12, theoretically the most modern of those available in Via Fani) jammed immediately, preventing Fiore from hitting the driver of the Fiat 130 with Aldo Moro on board, pinned to Domenico Ricci.

He was also held responsible for the murder of the lawyer Fulvio Croce, in which he participated as a 'driver' while Rocco Micaletto, supported by Lorenzo Betassa and Angela Vai, would have fired directly on the president of the Turin lawyers; above all, he took part in the murder of the journalist Carlo Casalegno, and in this circumstance it was Fiore himself who personally shot Casalegno with the Nagant pistol covered by Piero Panciarelli, Patrizio Peci and Vincenzo Acella. Both events took place in Turin in 1977.

Fiore's activity ended on 19 March 1979 when he was captured in Turin. During the trial in Rome on 24 January 1983, he was sentenced to life imprisonment. He never repented, and in 1997, he was given parole.

Fiore died on 28 July 2025, at the age of 71.
