= Carlo Casalegno =

Italian journalist

Carlo Casalegno (Turin, 15 February 1916 – Turin, 29 November 1977) was an Italian journalist and writer. He was killed by a group of four terrorists belonging to the Red Brigades; he was the first journalist ever to be killed during the Years of lead.

== Biography ==
After having attended the Liceo Classico Massimo d'Azeglio, Carlo Casalegno graduated in literature at the University of Turin and then, from 1942 to 1943, he was a teacher at Palli high school in Casale Monferrato. He took part to the Italian Resistance by joining the Action Party and contributing to its newspaper "Italia libera". During the Post War period, he kept writing for the magazine "Giustizia e Libertà" which, in the meantime, had taken the place of "Italia Libera". From 1951 to 1954 he was the director of the magazine "Resistenza. Giustizia e Libertà".

In 1947 he started to work for the Turin newspaper La Stampa of which he became deputy director in 1968. He was the only domestic policy editor apart from the chief Arrigo Levi. From 1969 to 1977, in his weekly column entitled Il nostro Stato ("Our state"), he wrote a articles on topical issues such as divorce, the secularism of the State and in particular terrorism, always asking for precision and firmness in applying existing ordinary laws to fight it. He completely rejected the idea of resorting to special laws to suppress terrorism, fearing that such an initiative could have caused an endless sequence of violence, producing a loss of democratic freedom.

In 1976 the trial of the Brigate Rosse began, with among its main defendants Renato Curcio. This trial developed in an incredibly strained atmosphere, which led up to the murder of the lawyer Fulvio Croce, who had taken the defence of Red Brigades' militants despite the fact that they had threatened whoever would have done that (one cannot go to trial in Italy without a lawyer). Casalegno with his articles urged everyone not to hide in the face of terrorism, suggesting everyone to fulfil their role.

=== Ambush of the Red Brigades ===
In 1977, on 16 November at 13.55, while he was going back to his house in Re Umberto avenue, 54 for lunch, Carlo Casalegno was ambushed by a fireteam of the Turin Red Brigades' composed of Raffaele Fiore, Patrizio Peci, Piero Panciarelli and Vincenzo Acella. It seems Red Brigades' militants had initially planned kneecapping him but, after a series of postponements and a discussion between the members of the Turin column, it was decided to kill him, mainly because of his latest articles, considered to be highly controversial towards the armed struggle. Red Brigades' militants had planned to shoot him in the lobby of the building; Raffaele Fiore was charged with the shooting, covered by Piero Panciarelli, meanwhile Peci stayed to watch over the area, equipped with a submachine gun, Acella was to drive the car ready for withdrawal.

When Casalegno arrived in the lobby, Panciarelli and Fiore got closer, and Fiore called the journalist to make him turn so as not to shoot him on the back; Casalegno turned and was immediately hit by four bullets in his face from Fiore's Nagant M1895. The Red Brigades' militants fled, believing they had killed him. Although he suffered serious injuries to the jaw and mouth, he didn't die right away. He was rescued by his wife, and taken to Le Molinette hospital. There were some community manifestations of solidarity: the night after the ambush, there was a popular manifestation of citizens against terrorism in Piazza San Carlo with the attendance of some thousands of people.

Casalegno died on 29 November 1977, 13 days after the attack. His funeral was held on the 1 December in the church of Crocetta neighbourhood. Among the participants were Gianni Agnelli, the politicians Bettino Craxi and Giovanni Spadolini, and the former minister Carlo Donat-Cattin. Besides his wife, Dedi Andreis, Casalegno left a 33-year-old son, Andrea, a journalist and militant at Lotta Continua.

During the subsequent trial in the Corte d'Assise, which took place in the summer of 1983, the Red Brigades' militants said they had chosen to kill Casalegno instead of kneecapping him (as they had done with Indro Montanelli) because of an article of the 11 November '77 titled "Non occorrono leggi nuove, basta applicare quelle che ci sono. Terrorismo e chiusura dei covi" (New laws are not necessary, it's enough to apply the already existing ones). According to Peci, Casalegno was sentenced to death for having offended the memory of some members of the Red Army Faction who died in jail in (Germany) between October and November 1977 (Io, l'infame, p.137).

== Legacy ==
He was awarded the Gold Medal for Civil Valor and the Gold Medal as Terrorism Victim.

In 1980 Rotary Club Roma Nord Ovest created a journalistic prize named after Casalegno.

In February 2004 Carlo Casalegno was given a posthumous Honorary degree in law by the University of Turin.

== See also ==
- List of journalists killed in Italy

== Bibliography ==
- Andrea Casalegno, L'attentato, chiarelettere, 2008. ISBN 978-88-6190-052-3
- Carlo Marletti, Francesco Bullo Il Piemonte e Torino alla prova del terrorismo, Rubbettino editore, 2004. ISBN 978-88-498-1063-9
