= Prospero Gallinari =

Italian terrorist

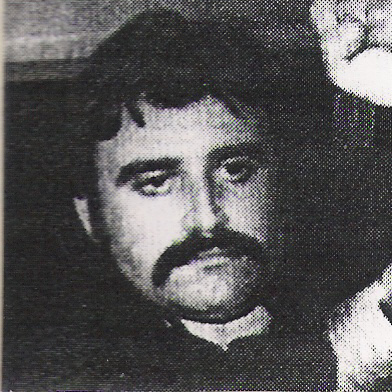
- Prospero Gallinari in 1974
- Born: 1 January 1951; Reggio Emilia, Italy
- Died: 14 January 2013 (aged 62); Reggio Emilia, Italy
- Other name: Il Gallo ("The Rooster")
- Status: Deceased
- Convictions: Terrorism; Multiple murder
- Penalty: Life imprisonment converted to house arrest for medical reasons in 1996

Prospero Gallinari (1 January 1951 – 14 January 2013), also known as "Gallo" (i.e. "rooster"), was an Italian terrorist, a member of the Red Brigades (BR) in the 1970s and 1980s.

== Biography ==
Gallinari was born in Reggio Emilia into a farming family of Communist tradition in 1951. At a very young age, he entered the Federazione Giovanile Comunista Italiana, in which he remained until the late 1960s. He emigrated to Milan, leaving his hometown.

== Militant activities ==
In 1969, together with Alberto Franceschini and other former Communist militants, Gallinari decided to pursue armed terrorism. After a short period as a member of the Superclan (a mostly unknown organization formed by Corrado Simioni, who was later accused of being the political mastermind of the Red Brigades during Mario Moretti's leadership), he became a member of the Red Brigades, initially as an external collaborator, then as a full clandestine member (1973-1974).

In 1974, he took part in the kidnapping of judge Mario Sossi and was later arrested in Turin, together with Alfred Bonavita. In 1976, he escaped from the prison of Treviso. He then belonged to the Roman "column" of the BR, and had a relevant role in the kidnapping of Aldo Moro, a Christian Democratic former prime minister of Italy (March 1978). Gallinari was one of the killers who ambushed the politician's car in Via Fani in Rome, assassinating three of the policemen who were part of Moro's armed escort. After Moro's kidnapping, Gallinari became a member of the executive committee of the BR. Moro was subsequently killed in obscure circumstances the following May.

== Arrest ==
Gallinari was arrested on 24 September 1979 while changing number plates on cars which would be used in a Red Brigade action. He was shot twice by the Italian police before he was arrested and underwent a five-hour emergency operation. Initially, he was convicted of killing Moro. However, later it was learned that not Gallinari but another Red Brigades militant, Germano Maccari, had killed Moro. According to the official trial reconstructions, Gallinari was present in the BR hideout in Rome where Moro was detained for 55 days, along with Moretti, Anna Laura Braghetti and Germano Maccari. During his detainment, Gallinari was one of the few BR terrorists who did not collaborate with the Italian justice. Instead, he continued to have contacts with the organization's free members and indirectly participated in their political debates.

== Semi-liberty regime ==
In October 1988, after most of the organization's members had been arrested, he co-signed a document with several other arrested Red Brigades terrorists confirming their belief in their creed. Due to health concerns (connected to the wounds he received during his arrest in 1979), Gallinari was allowed to spend certain periods of time outside the prison walls. In March 2006, he published an autobiographical book (entitled Un contadino nella Metropoli, "A countryman in the Metropolis"), providing his own version of the Red Brigades' deeds.

== Death ==
On the morning of 14 January 2013, Gallinari was found unresponsive in the garage of his home in Reggio Emilia and was brought to a hospital, where he was pronounced dead.

== Sources ==
- Gallinari, Prospero (2006). Un contadino nella metropoli. Milan: Bompiani.
