= Anna Laura Braghetti =

Italian political militant (1953–2025)

- Born: August 3, 1953; Rome
- Died: November 6, 2025 (aged 72); Rome
- Organisation: Red Brigades
- Spouse: Prospero Gallinari

Anna Laura Braghetti (3 August 1953 – 6 November 2025) was a far-left Italian terrorist who was a member of the Red Brigades.

== Biography ==
Braghetti was born on 3 August 1953 in Rome. She was a member of the Rome Red Brigades, and rented the apartment in Via Montalcini, which is believed to have been used for the imprisonment of kidnapped former Prime Minister Aldo Moro in 1978, prior to his murder.

Following the murder of Moro, Braghetti increased her involvement with the Red Brigades. On 3 May 1979, during a raid in Piazza Nicosia in Rome, at the headquarters of the Christian Democrats, she opened fire together with Francesco Piccioni against the State Police, resulting in the deaths of two officers.

On 12 February 1980, together with Bruno Seghetti, Braghetti participated in the murder of the vice president of the High Council of the Judiciary, Vittorio Bachelet. She was arrested on 27 May and sentenced to life imprisonment. In 1981, she married Prospero Gallinari, from whom she later separated. She did not benefit from any reduction in sentence and was given a conditional release in 2002.

While imprisoned Braghetti wrote a book, Il prigioniero (1988), about her time with the Red Brigades and the kidnapping and murder of Aldo Moro. The book was freely adapted into the film Good Morning, Night (2003) by director Marco Bellocchio.

Braghetti died in Rome on 6 November 2025, following a long illness, at the age of 72.
