= Communist Party of Italy (Marxist–Leninist) Red Line =

Political party in Italy

Communist Party of Italy (Marxist–Leninist) Red Line Partito Comunista d'Italia (marxista–leninista) Linea Rossa
- Secretary: Dino Dini
- Founded: 10 December 1968
- Dissolved: 1977
- Newspaper: Il Partito
- Ideology: Marxism–Leninism; Maoism

The Communist Party of Italy (Marxist–Leninist) Red Line (Italian: Partito Comunista d'Italia (marxista–leninista) Linea Rossa) was a political party in Italy that existed from 1968 to 1977. The group emerged in December 1968 after a split in the Communist Party of Italy (Marxist–Leninist) (PCd'I (m-l)).

== History ==
=== 1968 split ===
The split that produced the PCd'I (m-l) – Red Line had simmered since mid-1968. Osvaldo Pesce (a veteran communist leader from Milan and key founder of PCd'I (m-l) and Dino Dini had been sent to China as delegates of PCd'I (m-l). In Beijing, they were received by Mao Zedong, Zhou Enlai, Chen Boda, Kang Sheng, Jiang Qing, Yao Wenyuan, and other Politburo members. This visit occurred in the midst of the Cultural Revolution, characterized by mass mobilization against the party and state bureaucracy. The experience in China impacted the two Italian delegates, who upon their return began to question the role of Fosco Dinucci as the hitherto undisputed leader of PCd'I (m-l). Dini emerged as a factional leader within the party. In November 1968, an extraordinary party congress was held in Rovello Porro, at which the self-styled group of Dini, Angiolo Gracci, and some cadres from Tuscany converged with Walter Peruzzi's Lavoro Politico group from Verona in accusing the PCd'I (m-l) leadership of representing the ideological line of "the traitor Liu Shaoqi" (nicknamed "The Black Line").

On 10 December 1968, a split in PCd'I (m-l) was formalized as an anti-party group including Dini, Vincenzo Misefari and others, was declared expelled from the party. The same day, the group of Dini and Misefari began publishing their own version of the party newspaper Nuova Unità ('New Unity') from Florence (whilet the Dinucci loyalist wing of PCd'I (m-l) published theirs from Livorno). Effectively there were now two different parties using the name PCd'I (m-l). The Dini-Misefari group was joined by Arturo Balestri, Alberto Sartori, and the entire Florence unit of PCd'I (m-l), which was one of the strongest local branches of the party.

=== Black Line vs Red Line ===
Both groups claimed the name PCd'I (m-l), the nicknames PCd'I (m-l) – Black Line' (referring to the Dinucci group) and PCd'I (m-l) – Red Line (referring to the Dini–Misefari group) were used to distinguish the two. Dini became the secretary of the Red Line party. The Red Line party opened offices in Florence, Milan, Rome and Reggio Calabria. Young activists from the Lavoro Politico group joined the Red Line.

The Red Line group had to discontinue the publishing of their version of nuova unità for legal reasons. The monthly Il Partito (The Party), also published from Florence, was launched as its replacement. Il Partito later became a weekly newspaper, with Misefari as its director. Il Partito would largely concentrate on economic and trade union themes.

During 1969, tensions between the Black Line and Red Line groups developed into violent clashes and vandalism of party offices. The Black Line group accused the Red Line group of anarchism, revolutionary spontaneity, Trotskyism, and camouflaged revisionism.

=== Years of decline ===
In northern Italy, the Red Line group had the upper hand against the Black Line group for some time. However, their success was short-lived and the Florence branch of the Red Line group almost disintegrated completely. In southern Italy, the Black Line dominated the Maoist scene, and in the summer of 1970 the Red Line branch in Bari switched sides.

As the Red Line went into a period of decline, some of its members broke away and joined Aldo Brandirali's Italian (Marxist–Leninist) Communist Party. Peruzzi and his followers were expelled from the party, after Peruzzi had accused the party of differing from the Black Line only in words.

Il Partito ceased publication in 1973. At a 1977 party congress in Salerno, the Red Line was dissolved. In 1978, former Red Line members (including Gracci) joined Proletarian Democracy (DP).
