= Karl Heinz Beckurts =

German physicist and research manager

Karl Heinz Beckurts (born 16 May 1930 in Rheydt; murdered 9 July 1986 in Straßlach near Munich) was a German physicist and research manager.

With Karl Wirtz, he wrote a textbook on neutron physics. He was co-editor of the journal Nukleonik.

Along with his driver, Eckhard Groppler, Beckurts was murdered by a roadside bomb at 7:32 AM on 9 July 1986 in Straßlach, a village near Munich. The bomb used an electronic triggering device. The Red Army Faction claimed responsibility under the name "Kommando Mara Cagol" but the identity of the perpetrators is still unknown. The Bundeskriminalamt named Horst Ludwig Meyer as the only suspect for the bombing; Meyer was fatally shot in 1999 by the police in Vienna.

== Early life and education ==
He was born to Karl Beckurts (1894–1952) and Gisela Beckurts, who was born the Countess of Brockdorff. He began studying physics in 1949 at the University of Göttingen, where he received an undergraduate degree in 1954 and in 1956 earned his doctorate with a dissertation in non-stationary neutron fields. For both his diploma and his PhD thesis, Karl Wirtz served as the advisor.

Beckurts' father was an industrial clerk and Director General of the Gustloff Werke factory in Berlin.

After that, he was a researcher at the Max Planck Institute for Physics at Göttingen, under the tutelage of Karl Wirtz. In 1958, when Wirtz was named head of the Department of Experimental science for the Institute for Neutron Physics and Reactor Technology (INR) at the Karlsruhe Nuclear Research Center, Beckurts followed with him to continue his work. Also during this same time he was a resident at the Technical University of Karlsruhe, where he was a lecturer since 1959 and completed his habilitation in 1961. From 1963 to 1970 he was Director of the Institute for Applied Nuclear Physics at the Karlsruhe Nuclear Research Center and since 1964 was adjunct professor at the University of Karlsruhe. From 1967 to 1969 he was a visiting professor at the University of Heidelberg.

== Academic career ==
In 1969, he received a personal professorship in Heidelberg, but he resigned to instead take a position as Scientific and Technical Director of the Jülich Research Centre from 1970 to 1975. From 1975 to 1980 he served as Chairman of the Board of Management of the Jülich Nuclear Research Centre. Also, from 1973 to 1975, he served as Chairman of the KTG (Nuclear Society) and Vice President of the German Atomic Forum. In 1977 he was inducted in 1977 as a foreign member to the Royal Swedish Academy of Engineering Sciences. From 1980 until his assassination in 1986 he was a member of the Executive Board and Head of Corporate Research and Technology of Siemens AG. In 1971 he was appointed Honorary Professor at the University of Bonn as well as the University of Heidelberg in 1974.

=== Nuclear Work ===
With Wirtz he wrote a standardized work on neutron physics. He was one of the developers of the research reactor in Karlsruhe, where he built the modern data processing technology for the Nuclear Research Center and Director of the Institute for Applied Nuclear Physics for expanding on Nuclear Solid State Physics. He was instrumental in the development of the high flux reactor at the Institut Laue-Langevin in Grenoble.

From 1971 to 1975 he was a member of the German Science Council. He was also a member in the Euratom Committee for Nuclear Data and Nuclear Physics. From 1963 to 1966 he was the representative of the Federal Republic of Germany in the International Nuclear Data Scientific Working Group (INDSWG) of the IAEA in Vienna. From 1973 to 1976 he was Chairman of the Nuclear Society in the German Atomic Forum and also Chairman of several other large research institutions.

== Murder ==
Karl Beckurts was assassinated, along with his chauffeur Eckhard Groppler, on 9 July 1986 near Strasslach in Munich by a bombing at 07:32 am. The culprits used an electronically-triggered booby trap. The attackers claimed responsibility under the name "commando Mara Cagol" of the Red Army Faction (RAF). The true perpetrator is still unknown to this day. Horst Ludwig Meyer, the only suspect in this bombing called by the Federal Criminal Police Office was shot and killed by Vienna police in 1999.

=== Theories ===
In April 1986, the Chernobyl disaster occurred in the former Soviet Union. It was the worst to date and most consequential accident in the history of nuclear power. Since it also occurred in the middle of a heated political debate over nuclear power in West Germany, it has been speculated that the RAF wanted to win sympathy from the West German anti-nuclear movement against nuclear use.

== Memory ==
At the site of the attack, there is a memorial of the assassination for Beckurts. In his honor and memory of Beckurts the Karl Heinz Beckurts Foundation of the Association of the major research institutions (AGF) was founded by today's Helmholtz Association of German Research Centres in 1987. The foundation's mission statement is "to promote scientific work that is to be exercised as a bridge between natural science and technology on the one hand and the humanities on the other hand suitable". The Foundation awards the Karl Heinz Beckurts award annually.

Siemens named the Munich site in Neuperlach-Süd after him as the Karl-Heinz Beckurts house. An adjacent trail is named after Eckhard Groppler. On the same premises Beckurts and Groppler are honored with a memorial site. In Jülich, a street was named after Beckurts.

== Personal life ==
Beckurts was married twice. His first marriage produced a son and two daughters.

== Writings ==
- Karl Wirtz Elementary Neutron Physics, Springer 1958 English edition of Neutron Physics, Springer 1964
- Ralf Reichswaldhalle cooperation in management with integrated office automation, CW Publ., Munich 1984
- Technological progress, challenge and expectation: lectures, essays, interviews, 1980–1986, Berlin, Siemens 1986

=== Literature ===
- Drüll Dagmar: Heidelberg scholarly lexicon 1933–1986, Springer 2009
