= Margherita Cagol =

Red Brigade leader (1945–1975)

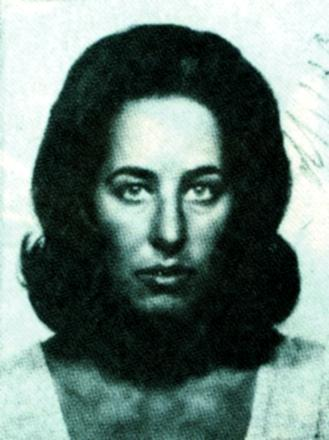
Mara Cagol, c. 1971

Margherita Cagol (Italian: [marɡeˈriːta kaˈɡɔl]; 8 April 1945 – 5 June 1975), also known by her nom de guerre Mara ([ˈmaːra]), was a leader of the Italian far-left urban guerrilla organisation the Red Brigades (Brigate Rosse, BR). She was married to Renato Curcio, another leader of this group.

== Biography ==
She was born to a middle-class family in Sardagna, Trentino, in the north of Italy. Her mother was a pharmacist and her father a prosperous merchant, owner of a perfumery. In 1964 she enrolled in the faculty of Social Science at the University of Trento. She soon became involved with left-wing student movements, where she got to know Renato Curcio. They worked for the publication Lavoro Politico (Political Work). She graduated in 1969. She married Renato Curcio in a Catholic ceremony, after which the couple moved to Milan, where she intended to study for a further two years.

The Red Brigades were formed with Alberto Franceschini in the second half of 1970, as a result of the merger of Renato Curcio's Proletarian Left with a left wing student and worker group. After getting arrested in February 1971 for occupying a vacant house, the Curcios and the most "extreme" members of the Proletarian Left went completely underground and organized the Red Brigades. They spent the next three years, from 1972 to 1975, engaging in a series of bombings and kidnappings of prominent figures. Renato Curcio was captured and jailed, but freed by Cagol in a raid on the prison five months later, on 18 February 1975.

In April 1975, Cagol, Mario Moretti and Renato Curcio met in a house near Piacenza to discuss their strategy. The organization was growing and they needed further finance to continue their militant activities. They decided to follow the example of the South American guerrillas and carry out a series of kidnappings, one of the victims being the industrialist Vallarino Gancia. He was chosen because he was wealthy and lived in a region with which they were familiar. According to Curcio, he had also financed a fascist organization.

He was kidnapped on 4 June while on his way to his villa in Canelli, near Asti, bundled into a transporter, and taken to Cascina Spiotta, a farmhouse near Melazzo, in the hills of Acqui Terme. The farmhouse had been purchased some time before by Cagol and had been used by members of the Red Brigades from Turin. Curcio did not take part in the operation; as a prison escapee, his picture had been published all over Italy, and it was considered too dangerous. Cagol, along with a companion, was left to guard Gancia. Later that evening, Cagol phoned Curcio to tell him that the operation had been a success. The following morning the Carabinieri began investigating farmhouses in the neighbourhood. Cagol had been on watch during the night and had gone to bed. Her companion, who took over the watch, fell asleep and did not wake up until the Carabinieri started knocking at the door. Their escape route was blocked by the Carabinieri's car, so they decided to storm out. In the ensuing gunfight, two police officers were wounded, and one was killed, as was Cagol.

Curcio was captured by the government in January 1976, tried, convicted and imprisoned.

== Legacy ==
Under the name Kommando Mara Cagol, the Red Army Faction claimed responsibility for killing Karl Heinz Beckurts and his driver, Eckhard Groppler, with a roadside bomb on 9 July 1986.
