= Amedeo Benedetti (writer) =

Italian scholar and writer (1954–2017)

- Born: 22 September 1954; Fivizzano, Italy
- Died: 18 April 2017 (aged 62)
- Occupations: Scholar and writer
- Writing career
- Notable works: Lezioni di politica di Henry Kissinger; Il linguaggio di Benedetto XVI, alias Joseph Ratzinger; Il linguaggio delle nuove Brigate Rosse

Amedeo Benedetti (22 September 1954, in Fivizzano, Tuscany – 18 April 2017) was an Italian scholar and writer.

== Life ==
He graduated in Classical Literature, in History and in Philosophy at the University of Genoa. Later he became literature and history teacher in a High School, an activity he continued until his death.

Benedetti spent more time writing. He has written essays on the language of important international characters, such as Silvio Berlusconi, Henry Kissinger, and Pope Benedict XVI alias Joseph Ratzinger.

His numerous studies about language have helped to promote an awareness in Italy of officialese, journalese, legalese, medical jargon, pidgin, political jargon, and of terrorist organisations (Red Brigades).

He further was an essayist and columnist for many journals, as “Lettere italiane”, “Esperienze letterarie”, “Otto/Novecento”, “Rivista di Studi Politici Internazionali”, “Critica letteraria”, and others.

== Works ==
- Il comportamento televisivo, Genova, Regione Liguria, 1996.
- Il comportamento radiofonico, Genova, Regione Liguria, 1996.
- Comunicazione e osservazione per musicoterapeuti, Genova, Associazione Italiana Studi di Musicoterapia, 1997.
- Il programma dell’Accesso, Genova, Erga, 1999. ISBN 88-8163-192-X
- Storia dei programmi televisivi di maggior audience, Genova, Erga, 1999. ISBN 88-8163-193-8
- Gli archivi delle immagini. Fototeche, cineteche e videoteche in Italia, Genova, Erga, 2000. ISBN 88-8163-182-2
- Gli archivi sonori. Fonoteche, nastroteche e biblioteche musicali in Italia, Genova, Erga, 2002 ISBN 88-8163-215-2
- Il linguaggio delle nuove Brigate Rosse, Genova, Erga, 2002. ISBN 88-8163-292-6
- Il cinema documentato. Cineteche, musei del cinema e biblioteche cinematografiche in Italia, Genova, Cineteca Griffith, 2002.
- (with Bruno Benedetti) Gli archivi della scienza. Musei e biblioteche della scienza e della tecnologia in Italia, Genova, Erga, 2003. ISBN 88-8163-215-2
- L’osservazione per l'intelligence e l'indagine, Genova, Erga, 2003. ISBN 88-8163-333-7
- Decisione e persuasione per l'intelligence (e la politica), Genova, Erga, 2004. ISBN 88-8163-355-8
- Bibliografia artigianato. La manualistica artigiana del Novecento: pubblicazioni su arti e mestieri in Italia dall'Unità ad oggi, Genova, Erga, 2004. ISBN 88-8163-358-2
- Il linguaggio e la retorica della nuova politica italiana: Silvio Berlusconi e Forza Italia, Genova, Erga, 2004. ISBN 88-8163-363-9
- Lezioni di politica di Henry Kissinger. Linguaggio, pensiero ed aforismi del più abile politico di fine Novecento, Genova, Erga, 2005. ISBN 88-8163-391-4
- Bibliografia ragionata sulla cultura delle immagini, Genova, Erga, 2005. ISBN 88-8163-415-5
- Il libro. Storia, tecnica, strutture, Arma di Taggia, Atene, 2006. ISBN 88-88330-29-1
- Manuale di sburocrazia. Analisi, note e proposte di correzione del linguaggio burocratico italiano, Genova, Aba Libri, 2008. ISBN 978-88-627-5000-4
- Bancarese addio! Proposte di correzione del linguaggio bancario italiano, Genova, Aba Libri, 2008. ISBN 978-88-627-5003-5
- Il linguaggio di Benedetto XVI, al secolo Joseph Ratzinger, Genova, Erga, 2012. ISBN 978-88-8163-657-0
- Dica trentatre. Analisi, note e proposte di correzione del “medichese”, Genova, Erga, 2012. ISBN 978-88-8163-707-2
- Mi rimetto alla clemenza della corte. Analisi, note e proposte di correzione del linguaggio giuridico italiano, Genova, Erga, 2012. ISBN 978-88-8163-711-9
