= Mario Moretti =

Italian terrorist and convicted murderer (born 1946)

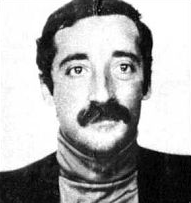
Mario Moretti

Mario Moretti (born 16 January 1946) is an Italian terrorist and convicted murderer. A leading member of the Red Brigades in the late 1970s, he was one of the kidnappers of Aldo Moro, former prime minister and president of Italy's largest political party Democrazia Cristiana (Christian Democracy). In 1978, Moretti confessed to killing Moro.

== Biography ==
Moretti was born in Porto San Giorgio, Marche region of Italy, into a middle-class, right-wing, family. Later Moretti tried to fabricate for himself a leftist and proletarian family environment, but the documents collected by the Italian Parliament's commission into the assassination of Aldo Moro later denied this reconstruction.

Recommended by an Italian noblewoman, Anna Casati Stampa, he moved to Milan in 1968 to work and to study at the Università Cattolica del Sacro Cuore. Moretti did not take part in the upheaval of 1968. In Milan, Moretti worked at Sit-Siemens, where he met Corrado Alunni, Giorgio Semeria and Paola Besuschio, future members of the Red Brigades (BR). He also became a member of CISL, the largest Catholic-oriented trade union in Italy. Together with others, he adhered to the Collettivo Politico Metropolitano founded by Renato Curcio and Margherita Cagol, which formed the historical nucleus of the Red Brigades at their constitution (August 1970). Moretti became a member of BR in the Spring of 1971. His first action was a mugging in June 1971, together with Renato Curcio.

In 1974, when Curcio and Alberto Franceschini were arrested, he became the organization's only leading member still at large, together with Cagol and Semeria, who were, however, respectively killed and arrested in the following year. One source suggests that Moretti, despite being informed by an anonymous phone call of the imminent arrest of Curcio and Franceschini, did nothing to warn them. Moretti pushed BR towards a more military attitude, and introduced a thorough separation between the members in order to reduce the consequences should any one of them be arrested. In 1975 he moved to Rome. In the spring of 1978 he organized the kidnapping and murder of Aldo Moro. The circumstances of this assassination are still not clear. It is known, however, that Mario Moretti was the only person to talk to Moro during the 55 days of Moro's imprisonment. Moretti also confessed to assassinating Moro after it became clear that the demand made by BR for the release of thirteen jailed terrorists in return for freeing the politician would not be met by the Italian government.

He was sentenced to six life sentences for his crime, but, after serving 15 years in jail, he was paroled in 1998. In terms of his parole, he is allowed to work outside prison, but must return to prison at night and over weekends.

=== Franceschini claims ===
In 1999 Franceschini claimed that he suspected that two leading Red Brigades members, Mario Moretti and Giovanni Senzani, were spies who had infiltrated the Red Brigades. These claims were made before an Italian parliamentary commission on terrorism in March 1999 and were published in L'Espresso. "From my knowledge of the people involved, I am convinced that that [i.e. the Moro operation] was an extremely complex operation that could not have been accomplished by the individuals identified as having participated in the official accounts", he informed the commission.

== See also ==
- Years of Lead
