= Aldo Moro =

Prime Minister of Italy (1963–1968; 1974–1976)

Servant of God Aldo Moro TOSD
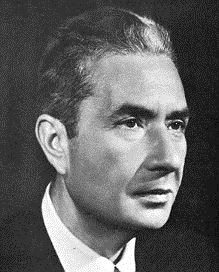
- Moro in 1972

Prime Minister of Italy
- In office 23 November 1974 – 30 July 1976
- President: Giovanni Leone
- Deputy: Ugo La Malfa
- Preceded by: Mariano Rumor
- Succeeded by: Giulio Andreotti
- In office 5 December 1963 – 25 June 1968
- President: Antonio Segni; Giuseppe Saragat
- Deputy: Pietro Nenni
- Preceded by: Giovanni Leone
- Succeeded by: Giovanni Leone
Ministerial offices
Minister of Foreign Affairs
In office 8 July 1973 – 23 November 1974
| Prime Minister | Mariano Rumor |
| Preceded by | Giuseppe Medici |
| Succeeded by | Mariano Rumor |
In office 5 May 1969 – 29 July 1972
| Prime Minister | Mariano Rumor; Emilio Colombo; Giulio Andreotti |
| Preceded by | Pietro Nenni |
| Succeeded by | Giuseppe Medici |
Minister of Public Education
In office 20 May 1957 – 16 February 1959
| Prime Minister | Adone Zoli; Amintore Fanfani |
| Preceded by | Paolo Rossi |
| Succeeded by | Giuseppe Medici |
Minister of Grace and Justice
In office 6 July 1955 – 20 May 1957
| Prime Minister | Antonio Segni |
| Preceded by | Michele De Pietro |
| Succeeded by | Guido Gonella |
Party's offices
President of the National Council of Christian Democracy
In office 14 October 1976 – 9 May 1978
| Preceded by | Amintore Fanfani |
| Succeeded by | Flaminio Piccoli |
Secretary of Christian Democracy
In office 26 March 1959 – 27 January 1964
| Preceded by | Amintore Fanfani |
| Succeeded by | Mariano Rumor |
Parliamentary offices
Member of the Chamber of Deputies
In office 8 May 1948 – 9 May 1978
| Constituency | Bari–Foggia |
Member of the Constituent Assembly
In office 25 June 1946 – 31 January 1948
| Constituency | Bari–Foggia |

Personal details
- Born: Aldo Romeo Luigi Moro; 23 September 1916 Maglie, Kingdom of Italy
- Died: 9 May 1978 (aged 61) Rome, Italy
- Cause of death: Assassination by gunshots
- Party: Christian Democracy
- Spouse: Eleonora Chiavarelli (m. 1945)
- Children: 4, including Maria Fida Moro
- Education: University of Bari
- Occupation: Professor

Aldo Moro (Italian: [ˈaldo ˈmɔːro]; 23 September 1916 – 9 May 1978) was an Italian statesman and prominent member of Christian Democracy (DC) and its centre-left wing. He served as prime minister of Italy for five terms from December 1963 to June 1968 and from November 1974 to July 1976.

Moro served as Italian Minister of Foreign Affairs from May 1969 to July 1972 and again from July 1973 to November 1974. During his ministry, he implemented a pro-Arab policy. He was Italy's Minister of Justice and of Public Education during the 1950s. From March 1959 until January 1964, he served as secretary of the DC. On 16 March 1978, he was kidnapped by the far-left terrorist group Red Brigades; he was killed after 55 days of captivity.

Moro was one of Italy's longest-serving post-war prime ministers, leading the country for more than six years. Moro implemented a series of social and economic reforms that modernized the country. Due to his accommodation with the Italian Communist Party leader Enrico Berlinguer, known as the Historic Compromise, Moro is widely considered to be one of the most prominent fathers of the modern Italian centre-left.

== Early life ==
Aldo Romeo Luigi Moro was born on 23 September 1916 in Maglie, near Lecce, into a family from Ugento in the Apulia region of the Kingdom of Italy. His father, Renato Moro, was a school inspector, while his mother, Fida Sticchi, was a teacher. At the age of 4, he moved with his family to Milan; they soon moved back to Apulia, where he gained a classical high school degree at Archita lyceum in Taranto. In 1934, his family moved to Bari. There, he studied law at the University of Bari and graduated in 1939. After graduation, he became a professor of philosophy of law and colonial policy (1941) and of criminal law (1942) at the University of Bari.

In 1935, Moro joined the Italian Catholic Federation of University Students (FUCI) of Bari. In 1939, under the approval of Giovanni Battista Montini, the future Pope Paul VI, whom he had befriended, Moro was chosen as president of the association. He kept the post until 1942 when he was forced to fight in World War II and was succeeded by Giulio Andreotti, who at the time was a law student from Rome. During his university years, Italy was ruled by the fascist regime of Benito Mussolini, and Moro took part in student competitions known as Lictors of Culture and Art organized by the local fascist students' organization, the University Fascist Groups. In 1943, along with other Catholic students, he founded the periodical La Rassegna, which was published until 1945.

In July 1943, Moro contributed, along with Andreotti, Mario Ferrari Aggradi, Paolo Emilio Taviani, Guido Gonella, Giuseppe Capogrossi, Ferruccio Pergolesi, Vittore Branca, Giorgio La Pira, and Giuseppe Medici, to the creation of the Code of Camaldoli, an economic policy plan drawn up by members of the Italian Catholic forces. It served as inspiration and guideline for the economic policy of the future Christian democrats. In 1945, he married Eleonora Chiavarelli (1915–2010), with whom he had four children: Maria Fida (born 1946), Anna (born 1949), Agnese (born 1952), and Giovanni (born 1958). In 1963, Moro was transferred to La Sapienza University of Rome as a professor of the institutions of law and criminal procedure.

== Early political career ==
Moro developed his interest in politics between 1943 and 1945. Initially, he seemed to be very interested in the social-democratic component of the Italian Socialist Party (PSI) but then started cooperating with other Christian-democratic politicians in opposition to the Italian fascist regime. During these years, he met Alcide De Gasperi, Mario Scelba, Giovanni Gronchi, and Amintore Fanfani. On 19 March 1943, the group reunited in the house of Giuseppe Spataro and officially formed the Christian Democracy (DC) party. In the DC, he joined the left-wing faction led by Giuseppe Dossetti, of whom he became a close ally. In 1945, he became director of the magazine Studium and president of the Graduated Movement of Catholic Action (Azione Cattolica, AC), a widespread Catholic lay association.

After being appointed vice-president of the DC, Moro was elected in the 1946 Italian general election a member of the Constituent Assembly of Italy, where he took part in the work to redact the Italian Constitution. It was during this period that his relations with the Italian Socialist Democratic Party (PSDI) and Italian social-democrats began. In 1946, Moro ran for the Bari–Foggia constituency, where he received nearly 28,000 votes. In the 1948 Italian general election, he was elected with 63,000 votes to the newly formed Chamber of Deputies, and was appointed Vice Minister of Foreign Affairs in the fifth De Gasperi government from 23 May 1948 to 27 January 1950. After Dossetti's retirement in 1952, Moro founded, along with Antonio Segni, Emilio Colombo, and Mariano Rumor, the Democratic Initiative faction, which was led by his old friend Fanfani.

== In government ==
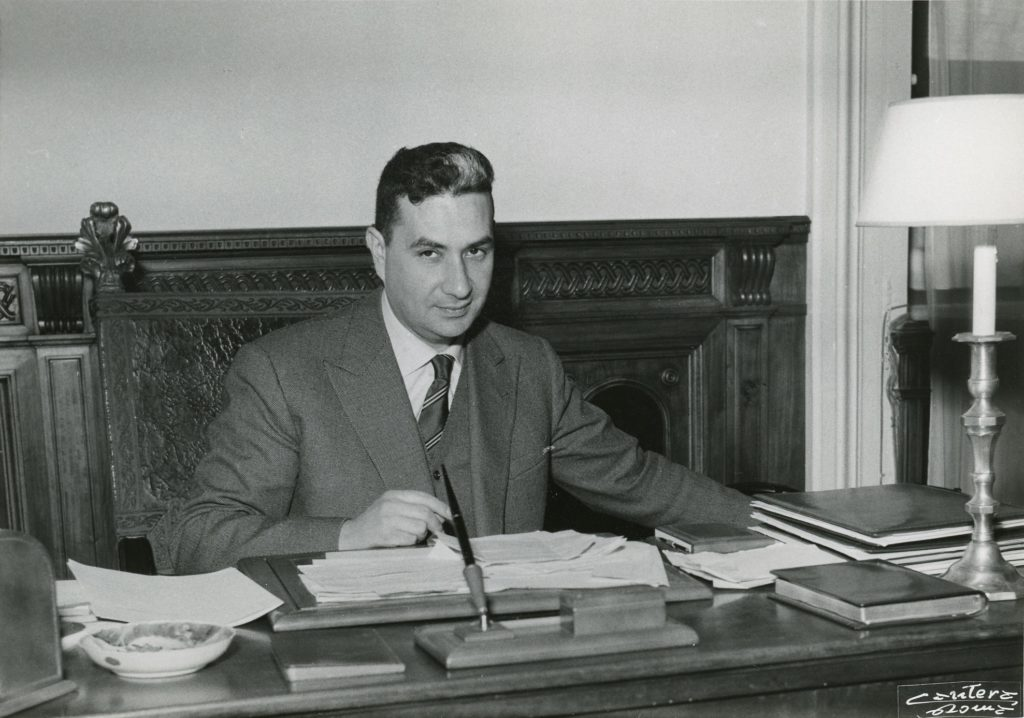
Moro in 1959

In the 1953 Italian general election, Moro was re-elected to the Chamber of Deputies, where he held the position of chairman of the DC parliamentary group. In 1955, was appointed as Italian Minister of Grace and Justice in the first Segni government led by Segni as Prime Minister of Italy. In 1956, he was among the most popular candidates, receiving the most votes during the party's congress. In May 1957, the PSDI withdrew its support to the government and Segni resigned on 6 May 1957.

On 20 May 1957, Adone Zoli was sworn in as the new head of government and Moro was appointed Italian Minister of Education. After the 1958 Italian general election, Zoli resigned. On 1 July 1958, Fanfani was sworn in as the new prime minister at the head of a coalition government with the PSDI and case-by-case support by the Italian Republican Party (PRI). Moro was confirmed as the head of Italian education and remained in office until February 1959. During his tenure, he introduced the study of civic education in schools.

In March 1959, after Fanfani's resignation as prime minister, a new congress was called. The leaders of the Democratic Initiative faction reunited themselves in the Convent of Dorothea of Caesarea, where they abandoned the leftist policies promoted by Fanfani and founded the Dorotei (Dorotheans) faction. In the party's national council, Moro was elected secretary of the DC and was then confirmed in the October's congress held in Florence. After the brief right-wing government led by Fernando Tambroni in 1960, supported by the decisive votes of the neo-fascist Italian Social Movement (MSI), the renovated alliance between Moro as secretary and Fanfani as prime minister led the subsequent National Congress, held in Naples in 1962, to approve with a large majority a line of collaboration with the Italian Socialist Party (PSI).

The 1963 Italian general election was characterized by a lack of consensus for the DC; in fact, the election was held after the launch of the centre-left formula by the DC, a coalition based upon the alliance with the PSI, which had left their alignment with the Soviet Union. Some rightist electors abandoned the DC for the Italian Liberal Party (PLI), which was asking for a centre-right government and received votes also from the quarrelsome monarchist area. Moro refused the office of prime minister, preferring to provisionally maintain his more influential post at the head of the party. Initially, the DC decided to replace Fanfani with a provisional administration led by an impartial president of the Chamber of Deputies, Giovanni Leone. When the congress of the PSI in autumn authorized a full engagement of the party into the government, Leone resigned and Moro became the new prime minister.

== First term as prime minister, 1963–1968 ==
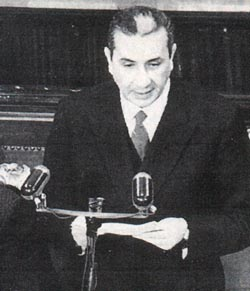
Moro speaking to the Chamber of Deputies in 1963

Moro's first government was unevenly supported by the DC but also by the PSI, along with the PSDI and the Italian Republican Party (PRI). The coalition, which replaced the previous Centrism system, was known as the Organic centre-left and was characterized by consociationalist and social corporatist tendencies.

=== Social reforms ===
During Moro's premiership, a wide range of social reforms was carried out. This included the 1967 Bridge Law (Legge Ponte). A bill approved on 21 July 1965 extended the program of social security.

Despite mistrust and opposition, particularly when the Italian economic miracle came to an end and the government had to control the rise of inflation, the reforms continued. There was an increase in minimum wage. Two 1966 laws provided traders with insurance.

=== Vajont Dam disaster ===
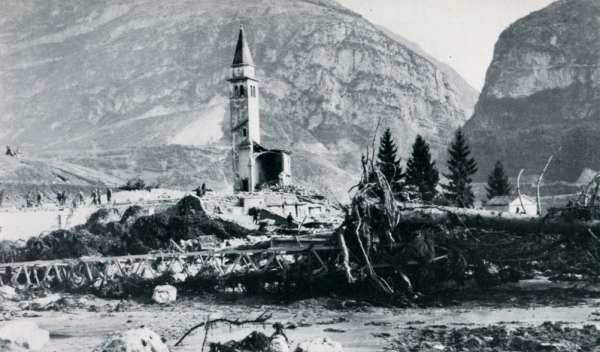
The destroyed town of Longarone after the megatsunami

During his premiership, Moro had to face the outcome of one of the most tragic events in Italian republican history, the Vajont Dam disaster. On 9 October 1963, a few weeks before his oath as prime minister, a landslide occurred on Monte Toc, in the province of Pordenone. The landslide caused a megatsunami in the artificial lake in which 50 million cubic metres of water overtopped the dam in a wave of 250 metres (820 ft), leading to the complete destruction of several villages and towns, and 1,917 deaths. In the previous months, the Adriatic Society of Electricity (SADE) and the Italian government, which both owned the dam, dismissed evidence and concealed reports describing the geological instability of Monte Toc on the southern side of the basin and other early warning signs reported prior to the disaster.

Immediately after the disaster, government and local authorities insisted on attributing the tragedy to an unexpected and unavoidable natural event. Numerous warnings, signs of danger, and negative appraisals had been disregarded in the previous months and the eventual attempt to safely control the landslide into the lake by lowering its level came when the landslide was almost imminent and was too late to prevent it. The PCI newspaper L'Unità was the first to denounce the actions of management and government. The DC accused the PCI of political profiteering from the tragedy, promising to bring justice to the people killed in the disaster.

Differently from Leone, who was his predecessor and became the head of SADE's team of lawyers, Moro acted strongly to condemn the managers of the society. He immediately dismissed the administrative officials who had supervised the construction of the dam.

=== Coalition crisis and presidential election ===
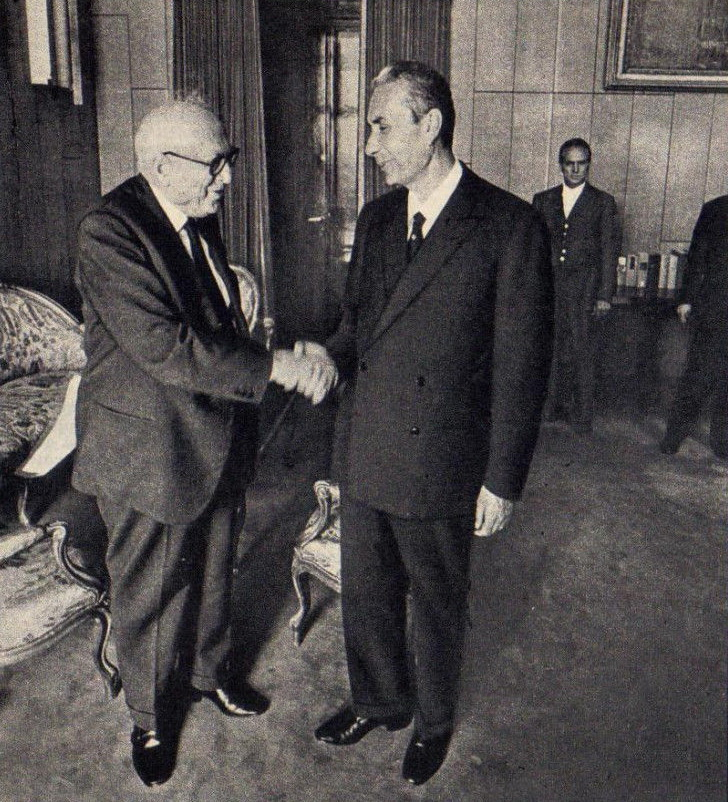
Moro with the PSI leader Pietro Nenni

On 25 June 1964, the government was beaten on the budget law for the Italian Ministry of Education concerning the financing of private education. On the same day, Moro resigned. During the presidential consultations for the formation of a new cabinet, Segni, the then moderate DC member and president of Italy, asked the PSI leader Pietro Nenni to exit from the government majority.

On 16 July 1964, Segni sent the Carabinieri general Giovanni de Lorenzo to a meeting of representatives of DC, in order to deliver a message in case the negotiations around the formation of a new centre-left government would fail. According to some historians, De Lorenzo reported that Segni was ready to give a subsequent mandate to the president of the Senate of the Republic, Cesare Merzagora, and would ask him to form a president's government composed by all the conservative forces in the Italian Parliament. This attempted coup, which came to be known as the Piano Solo, only became public in 1967 through the investigative reporting of L'Espresso. Ultimately, Moro managed to form another centre-left majority. During the negotiations, Nenni had accepted the downsizing of his reform programs. On 17 July 1964, Moro went to the Quirinal Palace, with the acceptance of the assignment and the list of ministers of his second government.

In August 1964, Segni had a serious cerebral haemorrhage and resigned after a few months. In the 1964 Italian presidential election, which was held in December, Moro and his majority tried to elect a leftist politician at the Quirinal Palace. On the twenty-first round of voting, the leader of the PSDI and former president of the Constituent Assembly, Giuseppe Saragat, was elected with 646 votes out of 963. Saragat was the first left-wing politician to become president of Italy.

=== Resignation ===
Despite the opposition by Segni and other prominent rightist members of the DC, the centre-left coalition, the first one for the Italian post-war political life, stayed in power for nearly five years until the 1968 Italian general election, which was characterized by a defeat for DC's centre-left allies. The PSI and PSDI ran in a joint list named Unified Socialist Party (PSU), which lost many votes compared to the previous election, while the PCI gained ground, achieving 30% of votes in the Senate. The PSI and PSDI decided to exit from the government and Saragat appointed Leone at the head of the new cabinet composed only by DC members.

== Minister of Foreign Affairs ==
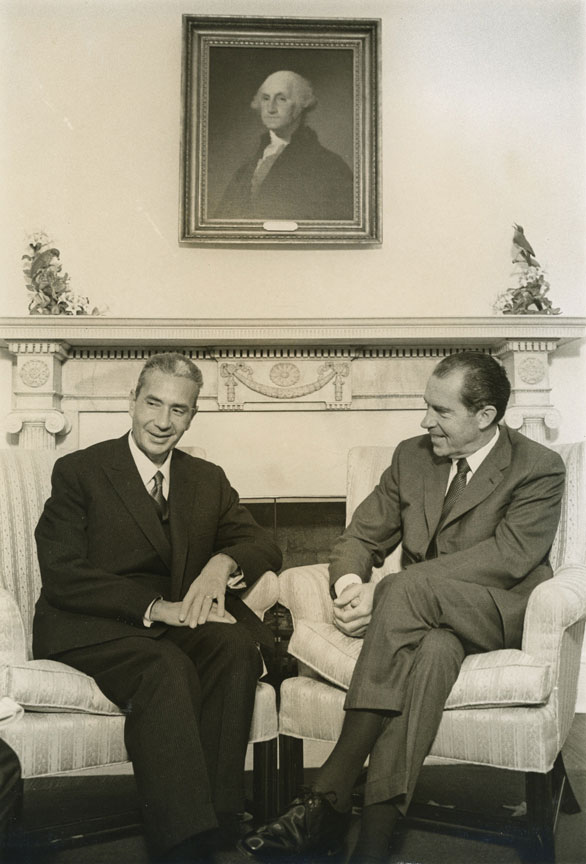
Moro with Richard Nixon in October 1969

In the 1968 DC congress, Moro yielded the secretariat and passed to internal opposition. On 5 August 1969, he was appointed Italian Minister of Foreign Affairs by the then prime minister Mariano Rumor, a position that he also held under the premierships of Emilio Colombo and Giulio Andreotti.

=== Pro-Arab policies ===
During his ministry, Moro continued the pro-Arab policy of his predecessor Fanfani. He forced Yasser Arafat to promise not to carry out terrorist attacks in Italian territory, with a commitment that was known as the Moro pact (lodo Moro). The existence of this pact and its validity was confirmed by Bassam Abu Sharif, a long-time leader of the Popular Front for the Liberation of Palestine (PFLP). Interviewed by Italian newspapers, such as Corriere della Sera and La Stampa, he confirmed the existence of an agreement between Italy and the PFLP, thanks to which the PFLP could "transport weapons and explosives, guaranteeing immunity from attacks in return".

However, the scope of the pact has remained controversial. In a 2008 interview, former President Francesco Cossiga stated that the understanding with Palestinian organisations did not extend to Israeli or Jewish targets, describing it as an arrangement under which Palestinian groups refrained from attacking Italian interests while retaining freedom of action against those associated with Zionism or the State of Israel. Referring to Cossiga's statements, a subsequent interpellation in the Italian Senate asserted that, under this interpretation of the lodo Moro, Jewish and Zionist individuals, "even if Italian" (se anche italiani), would not have been protected by the Italian state.

Following the declassification of intelligence documents in 2021, Italian media reported that the Italian authorities had received detailed warnings of a planned attack on the Great Synagogue of Rome before the terrorist attack of 9 October 1982. La Repubblica, citing the released documents, reported that the disclosures revived longstanding allegations regarding the lodo Moro, including claims that the arrangement protected Italian interests while leaving Jewish targets outside its scope. The attack, carried out by the Abu Nidal Organization, killed the two-year-old Stefano Gaj Taché and wounded 37 others. Following the release of the documents, COPASIR opened an inquiry into the intelligence warnings and the circumstances surrounding the attack.

About the pact, Abu Sharif commented: "I personally followed the negotiations for the agreement. Aldo Moro was a great man, a true patriot, who wanted to save Italy some headaches, but I never met him. We discussed the details with an admiral and agents of the Italian secret service. The agreement was defined and since then we have always respected it; we were allowed to organize small transits, passages, and purely Palestinian operations, without involving Italians. After the deal, every time I came to Rome, two cars were waiting for me to protect myself. For our part, we also guaranteed to avoid embarrassment to your country, that is attacks which started directly from the Italian soil." This version was confirmed by former president Francesco Cossiga, who stated that Moro was the real and only creator of the pact. Moro also had to cope with the difficult situation which erupted following the coup by Muammar Gaddafi in Libya, a very important country for Italian interests not only for colonial ties but also for its energy resources and the presence of about 20,000 Italians.

=== 1971 presidential election ===
In the 1971 Italian presidential election, Fanfani was proposed as the DC candidate for the office. His candidacy was weakened by the divisions within his own party and the candidacy of the PSI member Francesco De Martino, who received votes from PCI, PSI, and some PSDI members. Fanfani retired after several unsuccessful ballots and Moro was then proposed as a candidate by the left-wing faction. The right-wing strongly opposed him and the moderate conservative Leone was slightly preferred to him. At the twenty-third round, Leone was finally elected with a centre-right majority, with 518 votes out of 996, including those of the MSI.

=== Italicus Express bombing ===
On 4 August 1974, a bomb exploded on the Italicus Express, killing 12 people and injuring 48. The train was travelling from Rome to Munich; having left Florence about 45 minutes earlier, it was approaching the end of the long San Benedetto Val di Sambro tunnel under the Apennines. The bomb had been placed in the fifth passenger carriage and exploded at 01:23, while the train was reaching the end of the tunnel. The effects of the explosion and subsequent fire would have been even more terrible if the train had remained inside the tunnel. According to what his daughter Maria Fida stated in 2004, Moro should have been on board. A few minutes before departure, he was joined by some officials of the ministry who made him get off to sign some important documents. According to some reconstructions, Moro would have been the real target of the Italicus Express bombing.

== Second term as prime minister, 1974–1976 ==
In October 1974, Rumor resigned as prime minister after failing to come to an agreement on how to deal with rising economic inflation. In November, Leone gave Moro the task of forming a new cabinet; he was sworn in on 23 November 1974, at the head a cabinet composed by DC and PRI, and externally supported by PSI and PSDI.

During Moro's second term as prime minister, the government implemented a series of other important social reforms. A bill, approved on 3 June 1975, introduced various changes for pensioners.

=== Osimo Treaty ===
Map of the Free Territory of Trieste and its division after the treaty

During his premiership, Moro signed the Osimo Treaty with the Socialist Federal Republic of Yugoslavia, defining the official partition of the Free Territory of Trieste. The port city of Trieste with a narrow coastal strip to the northwest (Zone A) was given to Italy, while a portion of the north-western part of the Istrian peninsula (Zone B) was given to Yugoslavia. The Italian government was harshly criticized for signing the treaty, particularly for the secretive way in which negotiations were carried out, skipping the traditional diplomatic channels. Since Istria had been an ancient Italian region, dating back to Roman Italy, together with the Venetian region of the Roman Empire, as Venetia et Histria, Italian nationalists of the MSI rejected the idea of giving it up.

Between World War I and the end of World War II, Istria had belonged to Italy for twenty-five years, and the west coast of Istria had long had a sizeable Italian minority population. Some nationalist politicians called for the prosecution of Moro and Rumor, his long-time friend who was the then foreign affairs minister, for the crime of treason, as stated in Article 241 of the Italian Criminal Code, which mandated a life sentence for anybody found guilty of aiding and abetting a foreign power to exert its sovereignty on the national territory.

=== Resignation ===
Despite the tensions within the government's majority, the close relations between Moro and the PCI leader Enrico Berlinguer guaranteed a certain stability to Moro's governments, allowing them a capacity to act that went beyond the premises that had seen them born. The fourth Moro government, with Ugo La Malfa as Deputy Prime Minister of Italy, started the first dialogue with the PCI, with the aim of beginning a new phase to strengthen the Italian democratic system. In 1976, the PSI secretary Francesco De Martino withdrew the external support to the government and Moro was forced to resign.

== Historic compromise ==
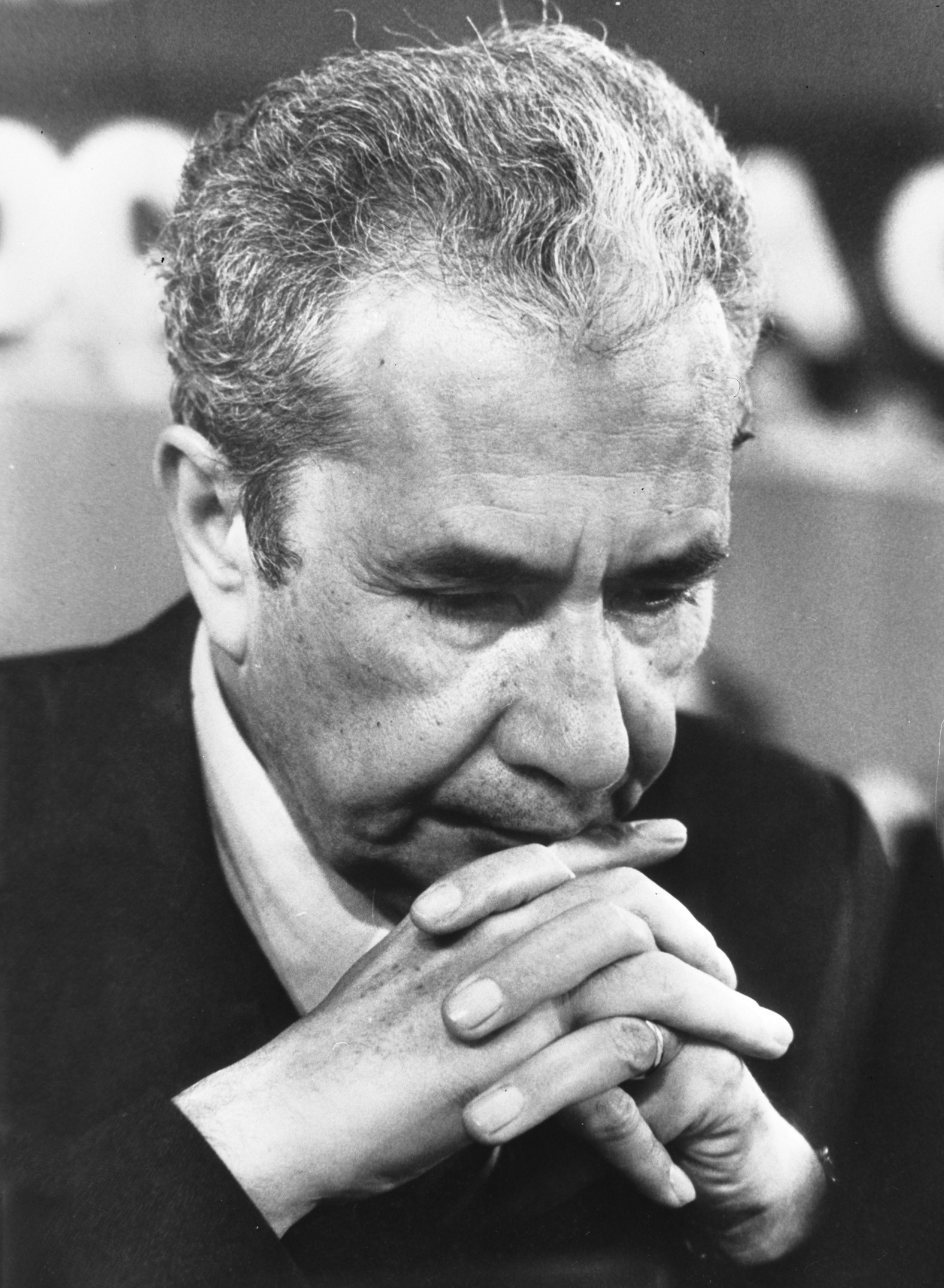
Moro in 1978

After the 1976 Italian general election, the PCI gained a historic 34% votes and Moro became a vocal supporter of the necessity of starting a dialogue between DC and PCI. Moro's main aim was to widen the democratic base of the government, including the PCI in the parliamentary majority, in which the cabinets should have been able to represent a larger number of voters and parties. According to him, the DC should have been at the centre of a coalition system based on the principles of consociative democracy. This process was known as Historic Compromise.

Between 1976 and 1977, Berlinguer's PCI broke with the Communist Party of the Soviet Union, implementing, together with the Spanish and French Communist parties, a new political theory and strategy known as Eurocommunism. Such a move made eventual cooperation more acceptable for DC voters, and the two parties began an intense parliamentary debate in a moment of deep social crises. In 1977, Moro was personally involved in international disputes. He strongly defended Rumor during the parliamentary debate on the Lockheed scandal, and some journalists reported that Moro himself might have been involved in the bribery. The allegation, with the aim of politically destroying Moro and avoiding the risk of a DC–PCI–PSI cabinet, failed when Moro was cleared on 3 March 1978, thirteen days before his kidnapping.

The early 1978 proposal by Moro of starting a cabinet composed of DC and PSI members, externally supported by the PCI was strongly opposed by both superpowers of the Cold War era. The United States feared that the cooperation between PCI and DC might have allowed the PCI to gain information on strategic NATO military plans and installations. Moreover, the participation in the government of communists in a Western country would have represented a cultural failure for the United States. On the other hand, the Soviets considered the potential participation by the PCI in a cabinet as a form of emancipation from Moscow and rapprochement to the Americans.

== Kidnapping and murder ==
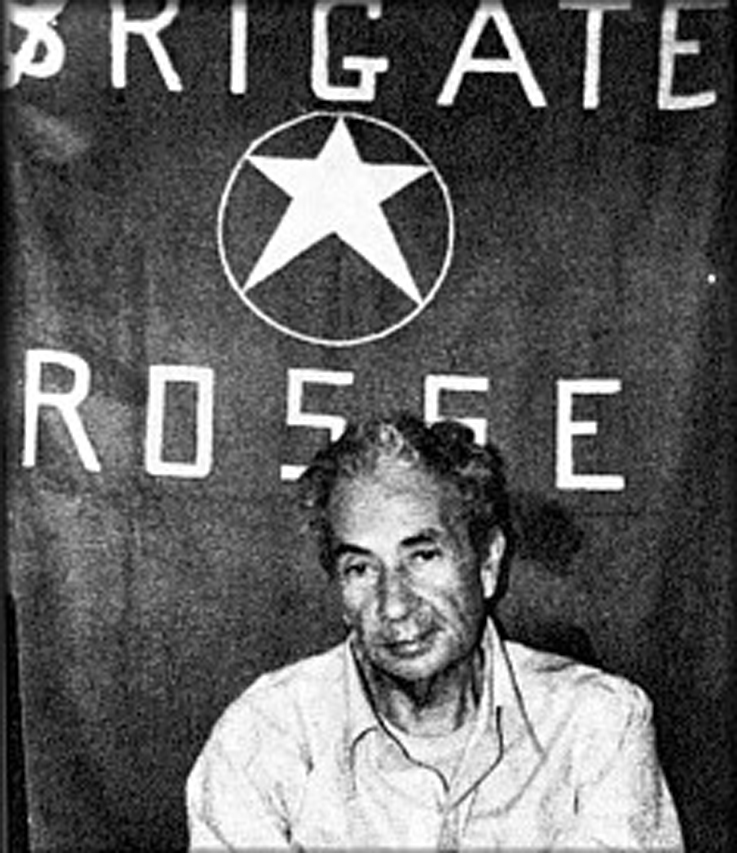
Moro photographed during his kidnapping by the Red Brigades

On 16 March 1978, on via Fani, in Rome, a unit of the militant far-left organization known as Red Brigades (BR) blocked the two-car convoy that was carrying Moro and kidnapped him, murdering his five bodyguards. On the day of his kidnapping, Moro was on his way to a session of the Chamber of Deputies, where a discussion was to take place regarding a vote of confidence for a new government led by Andreotti, that would for the first time have the support of the PCI. It was to be the first implementation of Moro's strategic political vision. Additionally, he was considered to be the frontrunner for the 1978 Italian presidential election.

In the following days, trade unions called for a general strike, while security forces made hundreds of raids in Rome, Milan, Turin, and other cities searching for Moro's location, as places linked to Moro and the kidnapping became centres of minor pilgrimage. An estimated 16 million Italians took part in the mass public demonstrations. After a few days, even Pope Paul VI, a close friend of Moro's, intervened, offering himself in exchange for Moro. Despite the 13,000 police officers mobilized, 40,000 house searches, and 72,000 roadblocks, the police did not carry out any arrests.

The event has been compared to the assassination of John F. Kennedy, and referred to as Italy's 9/11. Although Italy was not the sole European country to experience terrorism, the list including France, Germany, Ireland, and Spain, the murder of Moro was the apogee of Italy's Years of Lead. Many details of Moro's kidnapping remain heavily disputed and unknown. This has led to the promotion of a number of alternative theories about the events, including conspiracy theories, which remain popular in Italy, where the judicial truth, which attributes responsibility for the operation exclusively to the Red Brigades, has failed to take root in the collective memory of Italians. Alternative theories gained traction with the institution of a special inquiring committee by the Italian Parliament in 2014 that concluded its operations in 2018. The committee concluded that the judicial truth was produced on the basis of the confession of the terrorist Valerio Morucci and that other evidence which contradicted his version was downplayed. Among these, other witness testimonies indicated that more than four people fired at Moro's convoy, multiple sources report that Moro was held captive in the apartment of Via Massimi 91 in Rome (a property of IOR), and then in Villa Odescalchi on the coast of Palo Laziale, and not in Via Camillo Montalcini 8. In August 2020, about sixty individuals from the world of historical research and political inquiry signed a document denouncing the growing weight that the conspiratorial view on the kidnapping and killing of Moro has in public discourse.

=== Negotiations and captivity letters ===
The Red Brigades proposed exchanging Moro's life for the freedom of several prisoners. There has been speculation that during his detention many government officials, including the then interior minister Francesco Cossiga, knew where he was being held. Italian politicians were divided into two factions: one favourable to negotiation (linea del negoziato) and the other totally opposing the idea of a negotiated settlement (linea della fermezza). The government immediately took a hardline position, namely that the state must not bend to terrorist demands. This position was openly criticized by prominent DC party members, such as Amintore Fanfani and Giovanni Leone, who at the time was serving as president of Italy. All major political forces followed this hardline stance. This included the PCI, which supported democracy and was part of the Italian Parliament; the PCI was accused by the Red Brigades of being a pawn of the bourgeoisie. Exceptions were the Italian Socialist Party led by Bettino Craxi and the extra-parliamentary left.

On 2 April 1978, Romano Prodi, Mario Baldassarri, and Alberto Clò, three professors of the University of Bologna, passed on a tip about a safe-house where the Red Brigades might be holding Moro. Prodi stated he had been given the tip by the DC founders from beyond the grave in a séance through the use of a Ouija board, which gave the names of Viterbo, Bolsena, and Gradoli. During the investigation of Moro's kidnapping, some members of law enforcement in Italy and of the secret services advocated for the use of torture against terrorists; prominent military members and generals, such as Carlo Alberto dalla Chiesa, were against this. Dalla Chiesa once stated: "Italy is a democratic country that could allow itself the luxury of losing Moro, [but] not of the introduction of torture."

During his kidnapping, Moro wrote several letters to the DC leaders and to Pope Paul VI. Some of those letters, including one that was very critical of Andreotti, were kept secret for more than a decade and published only in the early 1990s. In his letters, Moro said that the state's primary focus should be saving lives and that the government should comply with his kidnappers' demands. Most of the DC's leaders argued that the letters did not express Moro's genuine wishes, arguing they were written under duress, and thus refused all negotiations. This position was held in stark contrast to the requests of Moro's family. In his appeal to the terrorists, Pope Paul VI asked them to release Moro "without conditions". The specified "without conditions" is controversial; according to some sources, it was added to Paul VI's letter against his will, and that the Pope wanted to negotiate with the kidnappers to secure the safety of Moro. According to Antonio Mennini, Pope Paul VI had saved ₤10 billion (equivalent to almost $60 million in 2026) to pay a ransom in order to save Moro.

=== Murder ===
When it became clear that the government would continue to refuse to negotiate, the Red Brigades held a summary trial, known as "the people's trial", in which Moro was found guilty and sentenced to death. They then sent a last demand to the Italian authorities, stating that if 16 Red Brigades prisoners were not released, Moro would be killed. The Italian authorities responded with a large-scale manhunt, which was unsuccessful. On 7 May 1978, Moro sent a farewell letter to his wife. He wrote: "They have told me that they are going to kill me in a little while, I kiss you for the last time."

On 9 May 1978, after 55 days of captivity, the terrorists placed Moro in a car and told him to cover himself with a blanket, saying that they were going to transport him to another location. After Moro was covered, they shot him ten times. According to the official reconstruction after a series of trials, the killer was Mario Moretti. Moro's body was left in the trunk of a red Renault 4 on Via Michelangelo Caetani towards the Tiber River near the Roman Ghetto. After the recovery of Moro's body, Cossiga resigned as interior minister. Pope Paul VI personally officiated at Moro's funeral mass.

=== New theories, revelations, and controversies ===
On 23 January 1983, an Italian court sentenced 32 members of the BR to life imprisonment for their role in the kidnapping and murder of Moro, among other crimes. Many elements and facts have never been fully cleared up, despite a series of trials, and this led to a number of other alternative theories about the events to become popularized. In 1993, historian Giuseppe Tamburrano expressed doubts about what was said by the Mafia pentiti in relation to the Moro affair because, comparing the two memorials (the amputee of 1978 and the complete of 1990), he said that Moro's allegations addressed to Andreotti were the same, so Andreotti had no interest to order the murder of Carmine Pecorelli, who could not threaten him to publish things already known and publicly available. Andreotti underwent a trial for his role in the assassination of Pecorelli. He was acquitted in the first instance trial (1999), convicted in the second (2002), and acquitted by Italy's Supreme Court of Cassation (2003). In a 2012 interview with Ulisse Spinnato Vega of Agenzia Clorofilla, the BR co-founders Alberto Franceschini and Renato Curcio remembered Pecorelli. Franceschini stated: "Pecorelli, before dying, said that both the United States and the Soviet Union wanted Moro's death." Additionally, that Moro was suffering from Stockholm syndrome was questioned by the two reports of the Italian Parliament's inquiry about the Moro affair. According to this view, Moro was at the height of his faculties, he was very recognizable, and at some point it was he who was leading the negotiation for his own liberation and salvation. This position was supported by Leonardo Sciascia, who discussed it in the minority report he signed as a member of the first parliamentary commission and in his book L'affaire Moro.

In 2005, Sergio Flamigni, a leftist politician and writer who had served on a parliamentary inquiry on the Moro case, suggested the involvement of the Operation Gladio network directed by NATO. He asserted that Gladio had manipulated Moretti as a way to take over the Red Brigades to effect a strategy of tension aimed at creating popular demand for a new, right-wing law-and-order regime. In 2006, Steve Pieczenik was interviewed by Emmanuel Amara in his documentary film Les derniers jours d'Aldo Moro ("The Last Days of Aldo Moro"). In the interview, Pieczenik, a conspiracy theorist, and expert on international terrorism and negotiating strategies who had been brought to Italy as a consultant to Cossiga's Crisis Committee, stated: "We had to sacrifice Aldo Moro to maintain the stability of Italy." Pieczenik maintained that the United States had to "instrumentalize the Red Brigades". According to him, the decision to have Moro killed was taken during the fourth week of his detention, when Moro was thought to be revealing state secrets in his letters, namely the existence of Gladio. In another interview, Cossiga revealed that the Crisis Committee had also leaked, in a form of black propaganda, a false statement attributed to the Red Brigades that Moro was already dead. This was intended to communicate to the kidnappers that further negotiations would be useless since the government had written Moro off.

== Legacy ==
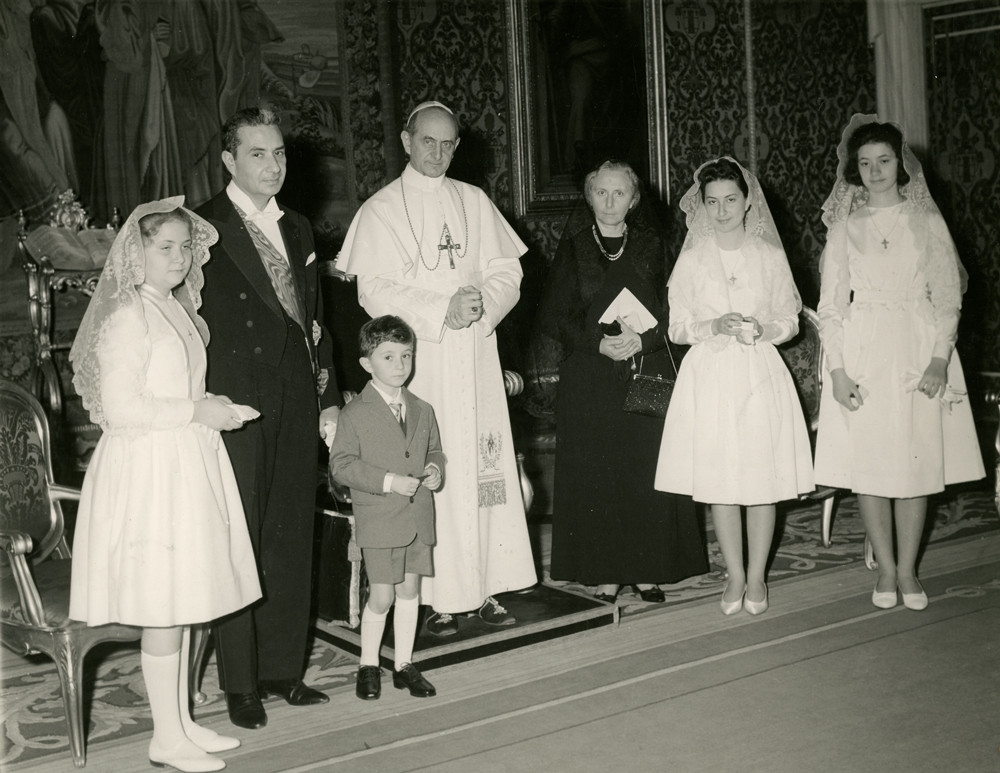
Moro and his family in the Vatican with Pope Paul VI

As a Christian democrat with social-democratic tendencies, Moro is widely considered one of the ideological fathers of modern Italian centre-left, having led the first centre-left government in the history of the Italian Republic, the Organic centre-left. He was the leading figure of the left wing of the DC, which he steered towards the left as the party's secretary-general from 1959 to 1964. While he was prime minister, a land reform was implemented in 1964; it has been described as the first step towards abolishing sharecropping (Mezzadria). Landless tenants were given cheap credit in order to allow them to own the land. Economically, Moro's policies are seen as a response to socialist influence. Although central planning instruments were never used, a five-year economic programme was established in 1965.

During his political life, Moro implemented numerous reforms that deeply changed Italian social life; along with his long-time friend and at the same time opponent, Amintore Fanfani, he was the protagonist of a long-standing political phase, which brought the DC towards more left-wing politics through a cooperation with the Italian Socialist Party first and the Italian Communist Party later. Due to his reformist stances but also for his tragic death, Moro has often been compared to John F. Kennedy and Olof Palme.

According to media reports on 26 September 2012, the Holy See received a file on beatification for Moro; this is the first step to becoming a saint in the Catholic Church. In April 2015, it was reported that the process of beatification might be suspended or closed following the recent controversies. The postulator stated that the process would continue when the discrepancies were cleared up. The halting of proceedings was due to Mennini, the priest who heard his last confession, being allowed to provide a statement to a tribunal in regards to Moro's kidnapping and confession. Following this, the beatification process was resumed.

In January 2022, a note claiming responsibility for the abduction of Moro was auctioned despite widespread condemnation.

== Electoral history ==
| Election | House | Constituency | Party | Votes | Result |
|---|---|---|---|---|---|
| 1946 | Constituent Assembly | Bari–Foggia | DC | 27,801 | Elected |
| 1948 | Chamber of Deputies | Bari–Foggia | DC | 62,971 | Elected |
| 1953 | Chamber of Deputies | Bari–Foggia | DC | 39,007 | Elected |
| 1958 | Chamber of Deputies | Bari–Foggia | DC | 154,411 | Elected |
| 1963 | Chamber of Deputies | Bari–Foggia | DC | 227,570 | Elected |
| 1968 | Chamber of Deputies | Bari–Foggia | DC | 293,167 | Elected |
| 1972 | Chamber of Deputies | Bari–Foggia | DC | 178,475 | Elected |
| 1976 | Chamber of Deputies | Bari–Foggia | DC | 166,260 | Elected |

== Cinematic adaptations ==
A number of films have portrayed the events of Moro's kidnapping and murder with varying degrees of fictionalization. They include the following:

- Todo modo (1976), directed by Elio Petri, based on a novel by Leonardo Sciascia, and made before Moro's kidnapping.
- Il caso Moro (1986), directed by Giuseppe Ferrara and starring Gian Maria Volonté as Moro.
- Year of the Gun (1991), directed by John Frankenheimer.
- Broken Dreams (Sogni infranti, 1995), a documentary directed by Marco Bellocchio.
- Five Moons Plaza (Piazza Delle Cinque Lune, 2003), directed by Renzo Martinelli and starring Donald Sutherland.
- Good Morning, Night (Buongiorno, notte, 2003), directed by Marco Bellocchio, portrays the kidnapping largely from the perspective of one of the kidnappers.
- Romanzo Criminale (2005), directed by Michele Placido, portrays the authorities finding Moro's body.
- Les derniers jours d'Aldo Moro (The Last Days of Aldo Moro, 2006).
- Il Divo (2008): La Straordinaria vita di Giulio Andreotti, directed by Paolo Sorrentino, highlighting the responsibility of Andreotti.
- Piazza Fontana: The Italian Conspiracy (Romanzo di una strage, 2012), directed by Marco Tullio Giordana, with Moro portrayed by actor Fabrizio Gifuni.
- Exterior Night (2022), also directed by Marco Bellocchio, with Fabrizio Gifuni repeating cast as Moro. Released as a film and a six-part miniseries, it was awarded at the 35th European Film Awards and the São Paulo International Film Festival.

== See also ==
- List of secretaries of the Christian Democracy
- Propaganda Due – Italian criminal secret organization that opposed Moro's Historic Compromise
- La Cagoule – far-right criminal organization that committed acts of terrorism to inculpate the political left

== Bibliography ==
- Bobbio, Norberto (1980). "Diritto e Stato nell'opera giovanile di Aldo Moro". Il Politico (in Italian). 45 (1). Rubbettino Editore: 7–26. ISSN 0032-325X. JSTOR 43210118.
- Cotturri, Giuseppe (1996). "Moro e la transizione interrotta". Studi Storici (in Italian). 37 (2). Fondazione Istituto Gramsci: 489–511. ISSN 0039-3037. JSTOR 20566771.
- De Siervo, Ugo (1979). "Il contributo di Aldo Moro alla Formazione della Costituzione repubblicana". Il Politico (in Italian). 44 (2). Rubbettino Editore: 193–224. ISSN 0032-325X. JSTOR 43208501.
- Drake, Richard (1995). The Aldo Moro Murder Case. Cambridge, Massachusetts: Harvard University Press. ISBN 978-0-6740-1481-7 – via Google Books.
- Fasanella, Giovanni (2018). Il puzzle Moro. Da testimonianze e documenti inglesi e americani desecretati, la verità sull'assassinio del leader Dc (in Italian) (E-book ed.). Milan: Chiarelettere. ISBN 978-88-3296-055-6 – via Google Books.
- Faso, Ignazio (1966). "Cronaca di una crisi di governo. La formazione del terzo governo Moro". Il Politico (in Italian). 31 (2). Rubbettino Editore: 276–292. ISSN 0032-325X. JSTOR 43206436.
- Fontana, Sandro (1981). "Moro e il sistema politico italiano". Il Politico (in Italian). 46 (1/2). Rubbettino Editore: 41–106. ISSN 0032-325X. JSTOR 43097908.
- Giovagnoli, Agostino (2008). "Aldo Moro: un democristiano atipico". Contemporanea (in Italian). 11 (1). Il Mulino: 95–100. ISSN 1127-3070. JSTOR 24653150.
- Hof, Tobias (2013). "The Moro Affair – Left-Wing Terrorism and Conspiracy in Italy in the Late 1970s". Historical Social Research. 38 (1 (143)). GESIS – Leibniz-Institut für Sozialwissenschaften in Mannheim: 232–256. ISSN 0172-6404. JSTOR 23644499.
- Mura, Salvatore (2013). "Aldo Moro, Antonio Segni e il centro-sinistra". Studi Storici (in Italian). 54 (3). Fondazione Istituto Gramsci: 699–742. ISSN 0039-3037. JSTOR 43592510.
- Pasquino, Gianfranco (1995). "Aldo Moro". In Wilsford, David (ed.). Political Leaders of Contemporary Western Europe: A Biographical Dictionary (hardcover ed.). New York: Bloomsbury Academic. pp. 339–345. ISBN 978-03-1328-623-0 – via Google Books.
- Ruffilli, Roberto (1981). "Religione, diritto e politica negli anni quaranta: Aldo Moro". Il Politico (in Italian). 46 (1/2). Rubbettino Editore: 5–40. ISSN 0032-325X. JSTOR 43097907.
- Sergio, Marialuisa Lucia (2009). "Il Centro perduto: Aldo Moro e i sindacalisti cristiani nella crisi del '68". Ventunesimo Secolo (in Italian). 8 (20). Rubbettino Editore: 143–166. ISSN 1594-3755. JSTOR 23720999.
- Totaro, Pierluigi (2005). "L'azione politica di Aldo Moro per l'autonomia e l'unità della Dc nella crisi del 1960". Studi Storici (in Italian). 46 (2). Fondazione Istituto Gramsci: 437–513. ISSN 0039-3037. JSTOR 20567305.
- Tranfaglia, Nicola (2014). "Aldo Moro e le culture politiche della Repubblica". Studi Storici (in Italian). 55 (2). Fondazione Istituto Gramsci: 481–494. ISSN 0039-3037. JSTOR 43592835.
- Vassalli, Giuliano (1980). "L'opera penalistica Di Aldo Moro". Il Politico (in Italian). 45 (1). Rubbettino Editore: 27–42. ISSN 0032-325X. JSTOR 43210119.
- Vedovato, Giuseppe (1978). "Aldo Moro". Rivista di Studi Politici Internazionali (in Italian). 45 (2 (178)). Maria Grazia Melchionni: 163–168. ISSN 0035-6611. JSTOR 42734233.
- Wagner-Pacifici, Robin (1986). The Moro Morality Play: Terrorism as Social Drama (paperback ed.). Chicago: University of Chicago Press. ISBN 978-02-2686-984-1 – via Google Books.

Political offices
| Preceded by Michele De Pietro | Minister of Justice; 1955–1957 | Succeeded by Guido Gonella |
| Preceded by Paolo Rossi | Minister of Public Education; 1957–1959 | Succeeded by Giuseppe Medici |
| Preceded by Giovanni Leone | Prime Minister of Italy; 1963–1968 | Succeeded by Giovanni Leone |
| Preceded by Giuseppe Saragat | Minister of Foreign Affairs; Acting; 1964–1965 | Succeeded by Amintore Fanfani |
| Preceded by Amintore Fanfani | Minister of Foreign Affairs; Acting; 1965–1966 | Succeeded by Amintore Fanfani |
| Preceded by Pietro Nenni | Minister of Foreign Affairs; 1969–1972 | Succeeded by Giuseppe Medici |
| Preceded by Giuseppe Medici | Minister of Foreign Affairs; 1973–1974 | Succeeded by Mariano Rumor |
| Preceded by Mariano Rumor | Prime Minister of Italy; 1974–1976 | Succeeded by Giulio Andreotti |
Party political offices
| Preceded by Amintore Fanfani | Secretary of Christian Democracy; 1959–1964 | Succeeded by Mariano Rumor |
| Preceded by Amintore Fanfani | President of Christian Democracy; 1976–1978 | Succeeded by Flaminio Piccoli |
