= Codice di Camaldoli =

1943 Italian economic policy plan

The Code of Camaldoli (in Italian: Codice di Camaldoli) is a document planning economic policy drawn up in July 1943 by members of the Italian Catholic forces. It served as an inspiration and guideline for economic policy of the Christian Democracy party, which was being formed at that time and that after the Second World War was for several legislatures the biggest party of government.

== Participants ==
The document was elaborated at the end of a week of study held from 18 to 23 July 1943 in the monastery of Camaldoli in Casentino. About fifty people from Azione Cattolica (Catholic Action) and the Catholic Institute of Social Work participated. According to Giulio Andreotti, the young people of Catholic Action were close to the future Pope Paul VI. The jobs were coordinated by Adriano Bernareggi, Bishop of Bergamo and ecclesiastical assistant of the graduates of Catholic Action. The guiding principles were worked out by Sergio Paronetto, Pasquale Saraceno and Ezio Vanoni. The definitive drafting of the Code was attended by Andreotti, Mario Ferrari Aggradi, Paolo Emilio Taviani, Guido Gonella, Giuseppe Capograssi, Ferruccio Pergolesi, Vittore Branca, Giorgio La Pira, Aldo Moro, and Giuseppe Medici. Finally, it was presented by Pietro Pavan. None of the signatories were present in representation of religious or political entities: each of the participants assumed personal responsibility.

== Premises and context ==
The Code of Camaldoli was conceived on the model of the "Malines Code", the first attempt at Catholic Social Doctrine, elaborated in 1927. The Camaldolese document was to be the sequel, ideal and timely. Compiled by the International Union of Social Studies in Malines, Belgium, the document represented an attempt to codify some of the fundamental principles of economic policy in the Catholic world in the twentieth century Europe (the Malines Code was then subject to partial revision in 1933).

According to Norberto Bobbio, the Malines Code was, with the encyclicals Rerum novarum (Pope Leo XIII, 1891) and Quadragesimo anno (Pope Pius XI, 1931), a fundamental text of the doctrine of Christianity. Despite the Lateran Pact of 1929, the relationship between regime and Catholicism was still under tension. On July 15, just three days before the start of the work, Giorgio La Pira had started hiding the publications of the periodical San Marco, which was immediately abolished by the regime. The day after the start of work, 19 July, there was the bombing of the Roman neighborhood of San Lorenzo, by the United States Air Force. The bombing of Rome led to an acceleration of Camaldoli's work, making the anticipated week to anticipate the return of participants to urgent commitments on the territory.

== Document content ==
At the end of the "retreat" week, some principles were agreed upon, then articulated in 76 enunciations later collectively considered as the Code of Camaldoli. Among the statements there was the definition of the function of the state: "The end of the state is the promotion of the common good, that is, to which all citizens can participate in their attitudes and conditions, well that individuals and families are unable to implement, since the state does not have to substitute individuals and families ... But a general directive (of social justice) must always be the protection and uplift of the less well-equipped classes, unless it is understood, distributive and commutative justice".

The subsequent definition of "common good" is noted in the note by Pope Pius XII's famous Christmas Radio Message 1942, which describes it as " the external conditions that are needed by all citizens to develop their quality and their offices, their material, intellectual, and religious lives, since, on the one hand, the strengths and energies of the family and of other organisms, which have a natural precedence, are not enough, on the other, the saving will of God has not determined in the Church a universal universal society serving the human person and the implementation of its religious ends''.

From the Acts of the Apostles came a warning about the possible legitimacy in some cases of civil disobedience: " If the state issues an unjust law, the subjects are not obligated to obey, but may be required to implement what the law provides for higher reasons. the object of the law is immoral, that is, it violates human dignity or is openly in conflict with the law of God, each is obliged to conscientiously not obey."

About the economic life of the state, after affirming that "For ordering economic life it is necessary to add to the law of justice the law of charity", the code lists eight moral principles to be informed of the activity of economic life:

- The dignity of the human person, which demands a well ordered freedom of the individual also in the economic field;
- The equality of personal rights, in spite of the profound individual differences coming from different degrees of intelligence, ability, physical strength, etc.;
- Solidarity, that is, the duty of cooperation also in the economic field to achieve the common goal of society;
- The primary destination of material goods for the benefit of all men;
- The possibility of appropriation in the various legitimate ways among which the work is paramount;
- The free trade of goods in respect of commutative justice:
- Respect for the demands of commutative justice in remuneration for work;
- Respect for the need for distributive and legal justice in the intervention of the state.

On the duty of solidarity, the Code prescribes that "As long as there are members in the society who lack the necessary, it is the fundamental duty of society to provide, both with private charity, with private charity institutions and with other means, including restriction of the property of unnecessary goods, to the extent necessary to satisfy the needy. "

On the point of the distribution of capital, it states that "a good economic system must avoid the excessive enrichment that it leads to a fair distribution, and in any case it must prevent that by controlling a few on concentrations of wealth, the overwhelming small groups on the economy".

== Document references ==
The document, especially in the list of 76 statements, refers to some inspirational texts, including:

- Thomas Aquinas, Politicorum I,1
- Thomas Aquinas, Ethicorum I,13
- Thomas Aquinas, I, II, XXI, 4, and III
- Paul of Tarso, Letter to the Romans, XII 1 - XIII, 5
- Acts of the Apostles, IV, 20
- Leo XIII, Rerum Novarum, 28
- Pius XI, Mit Brennender Sorge, 8
- Pius XII, Christmas Radio Message 1942, 102

== Effects on Italian politics ==
According to Paolo Emilio Taviani, the "Code" would subsequently strongly inspire the Christian Democrats engaged in the two decades following the reform which, as a result of the overcoming of autarky and protectionism, provided for the liberalization of foreign trade; and influenced on housing policy (Fanfani home plan), on the southern issue (the Cassa per il Mezzogiorno), on the forecast of works for the depressed areas, on agrarian reform, on the establishment and management of bodies state participation. According to Andreotti, the Code was conceived as a "social manifestation of Italian Catholics that served as a conceptual framework for the operational developments of the constructive action of the CC and for a stable and superficial reference to the political impact with which the Catholics would have come to confront".

It was in particular the system of state participations to be subject to subsequent criticisms. With the subsequent translation into the laws of that program, a state-owned system was developed based on Fascist Istituto per la Ricostruzione Industriale, briefly referred to as a system of state participations. Accompanied by related phenomena such as subsistence and identified by detractors as a signal of impenetrable statism, this system was increasingly pressed to be dismantled, as it is allegedly detrimental to the national economy. A very debated feature of that system was, for example, the so-called "improper charges", constituted by the costs incurred in by public companies for non-productive gain initiatives, aimed at the development of depressed areas, support for employment, public control of strategic sectors for military, political and economic security in the country.

According to Mario Ferrari Aggradi, some of these purposes (such as full employment) were expressly pursued with deliberate use of the possibilities offered by the system of state participations, in fact they defined the latter as "the preferred instrument for public intervention in economy".

== Bibliography ==
- The Code of Camaldoli, Rome: Editions Civitas, 1984
- Paolo Emilio Taviani, Because the Code of Camaldoli was a turning point, in " Civitas ", XXXV, July–August 1984
- Pasquale Saraceno, The system of state-owned enterprises in the Italian experience, Milan, Giuffrè, 1975.
- Bruno Amoroso - Ole Jess Olsen, The Entrepreneur State, Bari, Laterza, 1978.
- Giancarlo Pallavicini, essay published on the occasion of the "70th Anniversary of the Camaldoli Code", University Library, Link Campus University, Rome, September 20, 2013 ( online version ).
- Mario Ferrari Aggradi, Origins and development of the public industry in Italy, in "Civitas", September–October 1982.
- Maria Luisa Paronetto Valier, Editorial Code of Camaldoli, in "Civitas", July–August 1984.
- Nico Perrone, The planned disaster. State Participation in the Democristian Consensus System, Bari, Dedalo Libri, 1991. ISBN 88-220-6115-2
- Nico Perrone, The Sign of DC. Italy from defeat to G-7, Bari, Dedalo Libri, 2002. ISBN 88-220-6253-1
- Nico Perrone, Public Economics Removed, in Studies in Honor by Luca Buttaro, vol. V, pp. 241–289, Milan, Giuffrè, 2002. ISBN 88-14-10088-8
- Roberto Bonuglia, Catholic Reconstruction: The Code of Camaldoli, in Id., Economy and Politics by Camaldoli in Saragat (1941–1971), Rome, New Culture, 2007.
- Roberto Bonuglia, The Code of Camaldoli and Catholic Reconstruction, "Diari Di Bordo", N. 14, Preface by Carlo Vallauri and Paolo Massimo, Postfazione by Andrea Camaiora.
- Alessandro Angelo Persico, The Code of Camaldoli. DC and Research of the "Third Way" between State and Market (1943–1993), Guerini and Associates, Milan, 2014.
