= Vittore Branca =

Italian philologist and academic

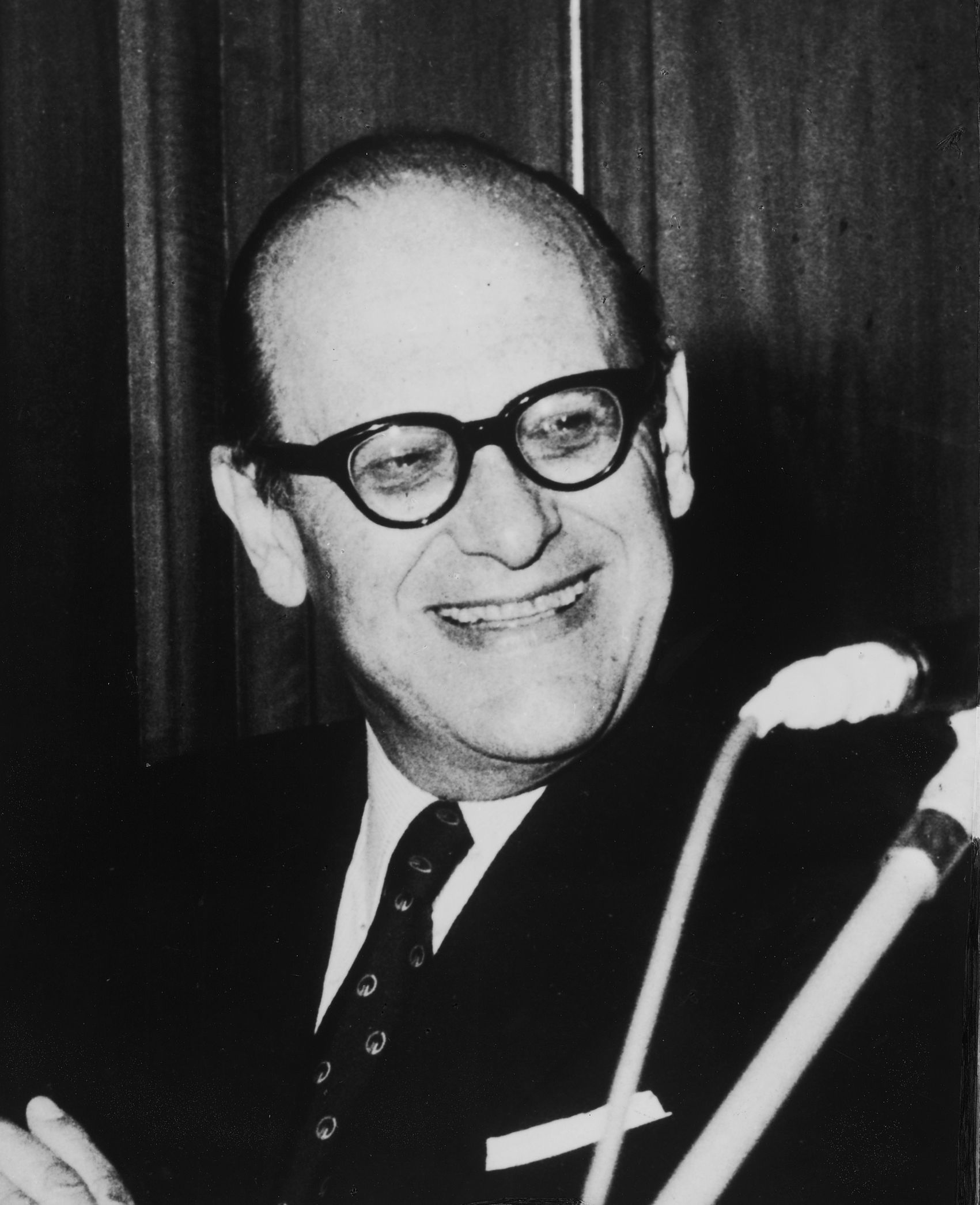
- Born: 9 July 1913; Savona
- Died: 28 May 2004 (aged 90); Venice

Vittore Branca (9 July 1913 in Savona – 28 May 2004 in Venice) was an Italian philologist, literary critic, and academic. He was a professor emeritus of Italian literature at the University of Padua until his death in 2004, and one of the most acclaimed contemporary scholars of Italian author and poet Giovanni Boccaccio.

A man with strong religious roots, he participated in the partisan struggle during the Second World War.

== Biography ==
Branca spent much of his childhood on Lake Maggiore.

After graduating from the classical high school Gabriello Chiabrera in Savona, in 1931 he attended the entrance examination at the Scuola Normale Superiore di Pisa, which at the time was part of FUCI. As a sign of protest, young Branca appeared before the examination committee wearing the badge of Catholic Action, whose youth circles were suppressed by the fascist regime. On this occasion he had his first encounter with Giovanni Gentile, who became his master. He graduated in 1935 with the highest grades.

Two years later, he was in Florence to collaborate with the Accademia della Crusca at the national edition of Boccaccio's works. He began to teach in high schools.

In July 1943 he took part in the work that led to the drafting of the Code of Camaldoli. After the arrest of Mussolini (who was executed two days after the Code's completion), Branca actively collaborated with the resistance. His cordial relations with Monsignor Giovanni Battista Montini, and by mediation of these with Alcide De Gasperi, made him a prominent member of Florentine anti-fascism, enabling him to represent the Catholic area of resistance in the direction Tuscan CNL. In 1944 he was contacted by Gentile, then president of the Academy of Italy, who invited him to collaborate "for homeland charity" in the New Anthology magazine. Branca, in spite of his profound connection with the philosopher, refused the offer, deciding to continue the struggle against Nazism. Gentile was killed by partisans in April of that year. In August, Branca participated in the dramatic events of the Florence uprising, which led to the liberation of the city.

During the years of the formation of the Republic, De Gasperi proposed him as deputy secretary of the Christian Democracy. Branca declined the invitation, preferring to focus on his academic studies and career.

Between 1944 and 1949 he taught at the University of Florence and in the faculty of Magisterium "Maria Assunta" in Rome. In 1949 he founded the magazine Italian Letters with Giovanni Getto. From 1952 to 1953 he was in Paris as a visiting professor at the Sorbonne University. In 1953 he began his career at the University of Padua, with which he would remain connected for the rest of his life. That year, he also joined the Board of Directors of the Venice-based Giorgio Cini Foundation; he was their vice president from 1972 to 1995, and president from 1995 to 1996.

Between 1968 and 1972 he was rector of the University of Bergamo. In 1968 he chaired an authoritative committee to establish the Institute of Foreign Language and Literature at the university. Until 1970, he collaborated on several occasions with UNESCO.

He died in Venice on 28 May 2004 at the age of 91. In Padua he was dedicated to the circulating library, and the adjoining hall-studio of via Portello. He left his library as a special fund at the Library of the Normal Superiore School.

== Education and academic activities ==
Branca's contributions to research on Boccaccio were fundamental. In 1962 he identified Hamilton 90 as a precious autograph of Decameron, written by Boccaccio around 1370. In 1998, he discovered a manuscript made under Boccaccio's personal supervision, also of the Decameron, conceived in the mid-fifties of the 1300s and formally drawn up in 1360.

Branca's studies have also influenced the philological field. He established the definitions of tradition characterized (that is, the study of an end-manuscript tradition in itself) and characterizing tradition (the ways and the reasons for which that tradition was created, from a point of view visual and musical arts).

== Works ==
=== Criticism and literary history ===
- The Singing of the Twentieth Century (Florence, 1936)
- History of Criticism at Decameron (Rome, 1939)
- Notes on Religious Literature of the Threeteenth Century (Florence, 1939)
- Notes for a Manzoni soul story, in Convivium, XIII, (1941)
- Mistics of the 13th and 13th centuries (Rome, 1942)
- Emilio De Marchi and meditative realism (Brescia, 1946)
- Alfieri and the pursuit of style (Florence, 1947)
- History of the Collections of Rhyme and Classical Collections, in Orientations and Problems of Italian Literature (Milan, 1948)
- The canticle of Frate Sole (Florence, 1950)
- Medieval Boccaccio (Florence, 1956)
- Tradition of the works of Giovanni Boccaccio (Rome, 1958)
- Literary Civilization of Italy (Florence, 1962)
- The Unfinished Second Centurion by Angelo Poliziano (Florence, 1962)
- European humanism and Venetian humanism, own essays and essays collected by Vittore Branca (Florence, 1964)
- Poetics of renewal and hagiographic tradition in Vita Nuova, in "Miscellanea Italo Siciliano" (Florence, 1966)
- European Renaissance and Venetian Renaissance id.id. (Florence, 1967)
- Fulvio Texts in the Court of Urban VIII and Felipe IV, in Revista de Occidente (Madrid, 1969)
- The new methods of criticism (Rome, 1970)
- Sebastiano Ciampi (Warsaw, 1970)
- Manzonian occasions (Venice, 1973)
- Concept, History, Myths and Images of the Middle Ages (Florence, 1973)
- Philology, Criticism, History, in collaboration with Jean Starobinski (Milan, 1978)
- Alfieri and the pursuit of style with five new essays (Bologna, 1979)
- Venetian Humanism, in History of Venetian Culture, vol. 3 (Vicenza, 1980)
- Medieval boccaccio and new studies on Decameron, Sansoni editore, Florence, 1981
- Politician and Humanism of the Word (Turin, 1983)
- Boccaccio displayed (Florence, 1985)
- Merchants and Writers (Milan, 1986)
- the Tuscan Esophagus (Venice, 1989)
- the Aesop veneto (Padova, 1992)
- Giovanni Boccaccio. Biographical profile (Florence, 1997)

=== Fiction ===
- A Dream (Florence, 1983)
- Ponte Santa Trinita (Venice, 1988)

== Honors ==
- Gold medal of the CNL of Tuscany
- Gold Medal of the Benemerites of Culture
- Knight of the Order of the Order of the Italian Republic
- Officier de la Légion d'Honneur
- Commissar of the Order of Poland "restored"
- Gold medal for culture
- Commissar of the OS of Malta
- Honorary Citizen of Florence ( 2002 )
- Venetian Institute of Sciences, Letters and Arts, of which he was president from 1979 to 1985

He also received honorary degrees from the following Universities:

- Budapest (1967)
- New York (1973)
- Bergamo (1973)
- Sorbonne of Paris (1976)
- McGill of Montreal (1985)
- Köln (1998)

== Notes ==
- Giorgio Padoan, "Vittore Branca", in AA.VV., Italian Literature. The critics , vol. V, Milan, Marzorati, 1987, pp. 3851-3861.
