= Lavoro Politico =

Marxist-Leninist magazine in Italy (1967–1969)

- Editor: Walter Peruzzi
- Categories: Political magazine
- Frequency: Monthly
- Publisher: Centro di informazione
- Founded: 1967
- First issue: October 1967
- Final issue Number: January 1969; 11-12
- Country: Italy
- Based in: Verona
- Language: Italian

Lavoro Politico (Italian: Political Work) was a Marxist–Leninist magazine published in Verona, Italy, in the period 1967–1969. It was one of the radical publications launched during the student movements in the late 1960s.

== History and profile ==
The first issue of Lavoro Politico appeared in October 1967. It was published by Centro di informazione on a monthly basis. Its editor was Walter Peruzzi. Mara Cagol and Renato Curcio were among the contributors.

Lavoro Politico supported class war as suggested by Karl Marx, Lenin and Mao and became a very prestigious theoretical publication among the radical students in Italy. It particularly praised the Red Guards movement in China. Lavoro Politico was one of the ardent critics of the workerism advocated by other Italian communist publications such as Classe Operaia. The magazine folded in 1969 after publishing the issue numbered 11–12.
