= Alberto Franceschini =

Italian communist militant (1947–2025)

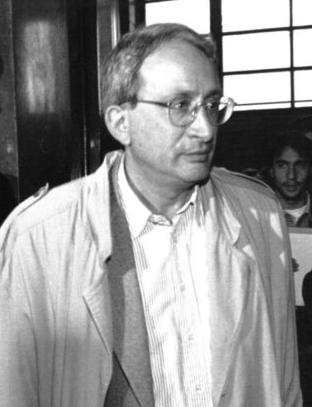
- Franceschini in the early 1990s
- Born: Alberto Franceschini; 26 October 1947; Reggio Emilia, Italy
- Died: 11 April 2025 (aged 77); Milan, Italy
- Organization: Red Brigades

Alberto Franceschini (26 October 1947 – 11 April 2025) was an Italian communist militant, a founder and leading member of the Red Brigades (Brigate Rosse), along with Renato Curcio, Margherita Cagol and Mario Moretti.

== Biography ==
Franceschini was born in Reggio Emilia into a communist family. His father had been arrested for anti-fascist activities in the 1930s, and his grandfather was one of the founders of the Italian Communist Party. At a young age he became a member of the Italian Communist Youth Federation.

The Red Brigades were formed in the second half of 1970 as a result of the merger of Renato Curcio's Proletarian Left and a radical student and worker group. They went completely underground and organized the Red Brigades and spent the next three years, from 1972 to 1975, engaging in a series of bombings and kidnappings of prominent figures. Franceschini was captured and imprisoned for setting up an armed band, setting up a subversive association responsible for many killings and kidnapping in 1974. He was released in 1992.

He appeared in a BBC documentary about Operation Gladio in June 1992.

Franceschini died in Milan on 11 April 2025, at the age of 77.
