= Renato Curcio =

Italian Red Brigade leader (born 1941)

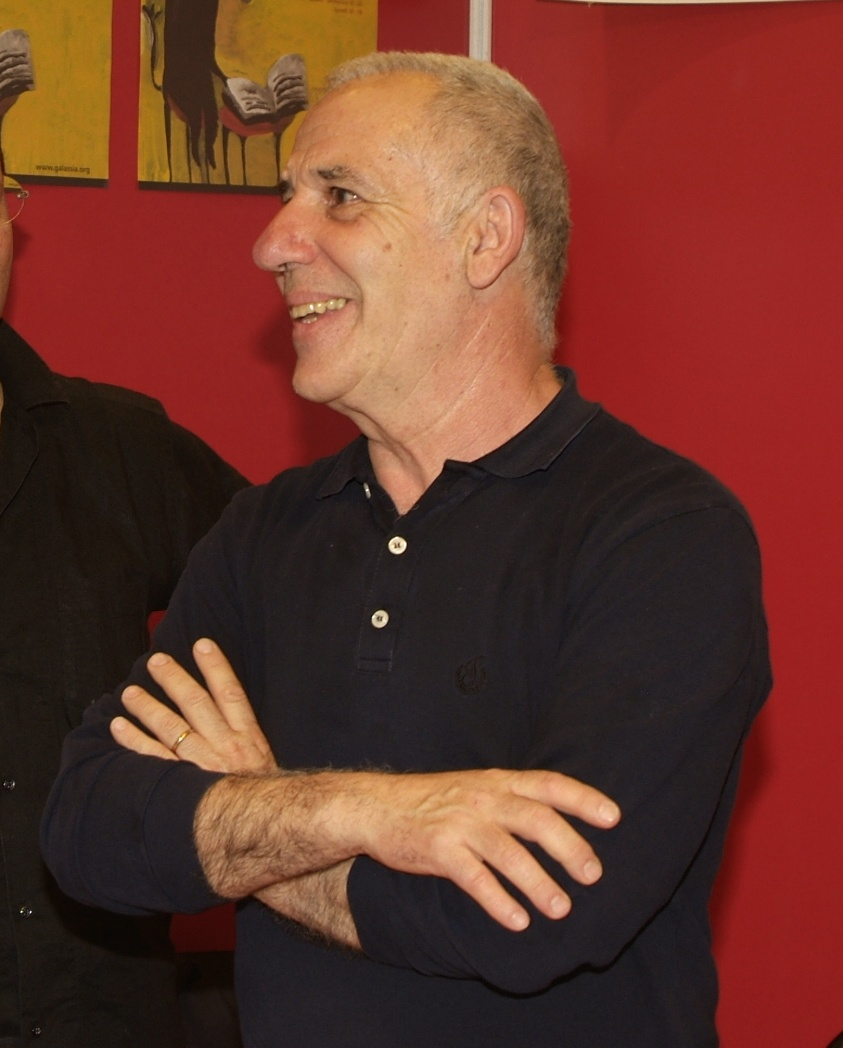
- Curcio in 2008
- Born: 23 September 1941 (age 85); Monterotondo, Lazio, Italy
- Education: University of Trento
- Occupations: Editor; political activist; sociologist
- Spouse: Margherita Cagol (m. 1969; died 1975)

Renato Curcio (Italian: [reˈnaːto ˈkurtʃo]; born 23 September 1941) is the former leader of the Italian far-left terrorist organization Red Brigades (Brigate Rosse), responsible for the kidnapping and murder of the former Italian prime minister Aldo Moro.

== Early life ==
Born of an extramarital affair between Renato Zampa (brother of film director Luigi Zampa) and Jolanda Curcio, Curcio was born at Monterotondo, in the province of Rome. His early years were a difficult time for him and his mother, a housemaid, whose itinerant positions with families required long separations. In April 1945, Curcio's beloved uncle, Armando, a Fiat auto worker, was murdered in a fascist ambush. The death of Uncle Armando caused Curcio to develop a hatred towards the Nazis and fascists. Although, he is also alleged to have been a member of the Neofascist group Jeune Europe.

A poor student, Curcio failed several subjects in his first year of high school and had to repeat the year. He then resumed vocational training classes until moving to Milan to live with his mother. He enrolled in the Ferrini Institute in Albenga, where he became a model student. During this period he was active in youth organization "Giovane nazione".

On completing his degree in 1962, he won a scholarship to study at the new and innovative Institute of Sociology at the University of Trento, where he became absorbed in existential philosophy. During the mid-1960s, he gravitated toward radical politics and Marxism as a byproduct of his interest in existentialism and the self. By the late 1960s, he had become a committed revolutionary and Marxist theoretician. In addition to Marxism, Curcio also studied the philosophies of Lenin and Mao, further influencing his leftist ideology. In 1967, Curcio would create a "counter-university" at the University of Trento, which focused on teaching courses that were the polar opposite from what was actually being taught at the university, including anti-capitalism, revolution, and Maoist thought.

According to Alessandro Silj, three political events transformed him from a radical to an activist: two bloody demonstrations at Trento and a massacre by police of farm labourers in 1968. During the 1967-69 period, Curcio was also involved in two Marxist university groups: the Movement for a Negative University and the publication Lavoro Politico (Political Work).

== Red Brigades and aftermath ==
Embittered by his expulsion from the radical Red Line faction of Lavoro Politico in August 1969, Curcio decided to drop out of Trento and forget his degree, even though he already had passed his final examinations. Prior to transferring his bases of activities to Milan, Curcio married, in a mixed (Catholic-Waldensian) ceremony, Margherita (Mara) Cagol, a Trentine sociology major, fellow radical, and daughter of a pent and worker group. Curcio and Cagol began publishing a revolutionary journal in 1967, entitled Political Work, which set up the ideological foundation for a number of groups, including the Metropolitan Political Collective (CPM). A more militant faction of the CPM, led by Curcio and Cagol, splintered off in 1967 and formed the Red Brigades, which was intended to participate politically while also conducting clandestine military operations.

However, after getting arrested in February 1971 for occupying a vacant house, the Curcios and the most militant members of the Proletarian Left went completely underground and organized the Red Brigades and spent the next three years, from 1972 to 1975, engaging in a series of bombings and kidnappings of prominent figures. One of these assassination victims was the Chief Inspector of Turin's anti-terrorism task force. In February 1975, Cagol and a small commando group from the Red Brigades broke Curcio out of a poorly secured prison without having to use any violence. Four months later, a shootout occurred at a safe house between the Red Brigades and the Carabinieri forces, resulting in Cagol being shot twice and eventually dying. The death of his wife forced Curcio into a deep depression, one that caused sloppiness in his work. Curcio was again captured by the authorities in January 1976, tried, convicted and imprisoned. The assassinations and kidnappings continued during his incarceration, however, creating suspicion about whether or not Curcio was the actual leader of the group.

After Curcio's incarceration, the Red Brigades began changing its identity, with its members becoming younger and increasingly more militant. This increased militarization of the group led to a sharp uptick in the number of attacks and assassinations between the years of 1976 and 1978, culminating in the assassination of former Italian Prime Minister Aldo Moro in 1978.

In 1990, while still incarcerated, Curcio started a publishing company, along with Steffano Petrella and Nicola Valentino, called Sensibili alle Foglie, or Sensitive to the Leaves.

In April 1993 he was allowed to spend the day outside the jail in order to work as a writer, then in 1998 he was freed.

To date, Curcio has not expressed remorse for the activity of the Red Brigades.

In August 2007, French actress Fanny Ardant expressed her "admiration" for the Red Brigades leader as a "hero", adding she "considered the Red Brigades phenomenon to be very moving and passionate". For her comments, the actress was sued in the Italian courts by Piero Mazzola, the son of an Italian police officer killed by the Red Brigades.
