= Red Brigades =

Italian Marxist–Leninist militant group

- Brigate Rosse
- Flag of the Red Brigades
- Other name: Combatant Communist Party
- Leaders: Renato Curcio; Margherita Cagol; Alberto Franceschini
- Dates active: Red Brigades; August 1970 – 23 October 1988; New Red Brigades; 20 May 1999 – 25 September 2006
- Active regions: Italy
- Ideology: Communism; Marxism–Leninism
- Political position: Far-left
- Wars: Years of Lead

The Red Brigades (Italian: Brigate Rosse [briˈɡaːte ˈrosse], often abbreviated BR) were an Italian far-left Marxist–Leninist militant group. It was responsible for numerous violent attacks during Italy's Years of Lead, including the kidnapping and murder of Aldo Moro in 1978, a former prime minister of Italy through the organic centre-left. The assassination of Moro was a national shock in Italy, as was that of left-wing trade unionist Guido Rossa in January 1979. Sandro Pertini, the then left-wing president of Italy, said at Rossa's funeral: "It is not the President of the Republic speaking, but comrade Pertini. I knew [the real] red brigades: they fought with me against the fascists, not against democrats. For shame!"

Formed in 1970, the Red Brigades sought to create a revolutionary state through armed struggle, and to remove Italy from the North Atlantic Treaty Organization (NATO). The organization attained notoriety in the 1970s and early 1980s with their violent acts of sabotage, bank robberies, the kneecapping of certain industrialists, factory owners, bankers, and politicians deemed to be exploitative, as well as the kidnappings or murders of industrialists, prominent capitalists, politicians, law enforcement officials, and other perceived enemies of the working-class revolution. Nearly fifty people were killed in its attacks between 1974 and 1988. According to the Center for International Security and Cooperation, the BR was a "broadly diffused" terrorist group.

Models for the BR included the Latin American urban guerrilla movements and the World War II era Italian partisan movement. The group was also influenced by volumes on the Tupamaros of Uruguay published by Giangiacomo Feltrinelli, which in the words of historian Paul Ginsborg became "a sort of do-it-yourself manual for the early Red Brigades". Other influences included the Algerian National Liberation Front and the Viet Cong.

In the 1980s, the group was broken up by Italian investigators, with the aid of several leaders under arrest who turned pentiti and assisted the authorities in capturing the other members. The group had a resurgence in the late 1990s to the 2000s. Although Italy was not the sole country to experience years of terrorism, the BR were the most powerful, largest, and longest-lived post-World War II left-wing terrorist group in Western Europe. Like-minded organizations were the Red Army Faction in Germany, the Irish National Liberation Army (with their political wing, the Irish Republican Socialist Party) in Ireland, and, in Spain, the Basque left-wing nationalist group ETA. Countries hit by terrorism included France, Germany, Ireland, and Spain.

Throughout their existence, the BR were generally opposed by other far-left groups, such as Lotta Continua and Potere Operaio, and were isolated from the Italian political left, including by the Italian Communist Party (PCI), which they opposed for their Historic Compromise with Moro and Christian Democracy. With the kidnapping and murder of Moro, they were instrumental in blocking the PCI's road to government. In the words of historian David Broder, rather than causing through their actions a radicalization of the Italian political landscape as they had hoped, it resulted in an anti-communist blowback and a decline for the extra-parliamentary left, which has sometimes prompted accusations that the Red Brigades were infiltrated by anti-communist or governmental entities seeking to undermine the group, especially in regard to the kidnapping and murder of Aldo Moro.

== 1970: First BR generation ==
The Red Brigades were formed in August 1970. Its founders were Renato Curcio and Margherita Cagol, who had met as students at the University of Trento and later married, and Alberto Franceschini. Franceschini's grandmother had been a leader of the peasant leagues, his father a worker and anti-fascist who had been deported to Auschwitz.

The formation of the Red Brigades took place in the context of social struggles in the late 1960s. Workers' strikes shook factories, Pirelli and Siemens in particular, which led part of the labour movement to adopt "armed propaganda" as a method of struggle. The first actions, such as the destruction of foremen's vehicles or sequestration of executives, reflect the social composition of the armed groups. Among the 1,337 people convicted of belonging to the Red Brigades, 70% were workers, service sector employees or students.

The fear of a far-right power grab in Italy, like the regime of the colonels in Greece and the military dictatorship of Chile led by Augusto Pinochet, in a country still scarred by its Italian fascist past, partly explains why far-left activity has developed in Italy more than in any other European country. Sergio Segio, one of the figures of the Years of Lead, said: "I grew up with the idea that they were planning a coup, like in Greece or Chile. And that they would have killed us. In fact, they had already started." Between 1969 and 1975, attacks and political violence were mainly attributable to right-wing groups (95% from 1969 to 1973, 85% in 1974, and 78% in 1975).

While the Trento group around Curcio had its main roots in the Sociology Department of the Catholic University, the Reggio Emilia group (around Franceschini) included mostly former members of the Italian Communist Youth Federation (FGCI) expelled from the PCI for extremist views. In the beginning, the BR were mainly active in Reggio Emilia, in large factories in Milan (Pirelli, Sit-Siemens, and Magneti Marelli) and in Turin (Fiat). Members sabotaged factory equipment and broke into factory offices and trade union headquarters. In 1972, they carried out their first kidnapping, in which a factory foreman for Sit Siemens was held for around twenty minutes whilst pictures were taken of him wearing a placard declaring him to be a fascist. The foreman was then released unharmed.

The BR's kidnappings were different from those in Latin American or European groups in that, apart from two major exceptions, they had been pursued not for immediate practical possibilities but for symbolic ritualism, where the targeted symbol represented an action towards the symbolized entity. Initially, the BR focused on managerial staff and right-wing trade unionists from the country's largest firms, such as Alfa Romeo, Fiat, and Sit-Siemens. By 1974, with the decrease of working-class mobilization, they shifted from the factory to the state and its institutions; in 1976, they described in particular the magistrature as "the weakest link in the chain of power". Subsequently, they began targeting politicians. During the 1970s, the BR had carried out eight symbolic kidnappings. They all followed a similar path in which the victim was subjected to a summary trial, held in captivity for a period between 20 minutes to 55 days, and then released unharmed. Aldo Moro's, the ninth of those symbolic kidnappings, was the only one to result in murder.

During this time, the BR's activities were denounced by far-left political groups, such as Lotta Continua and Potere Operaio, which were closer to the autonomist movement. Those like Lotta Continua shared the need for armed self-defence against police and fascist violence but were critical of terrorist actions, which they saw as elitist and counterproductive, and condemned the BR as a catalyst rather than an answer to repression. Lotta Continua questioned the BR's claim that eliminating individual capitalists would have strengthened class organization. After its dissolution, the Lotta Continua continuity paper headlined "neither with the state nor the Red Brigades".

Frequent allegations of links between the BR and the intelligence services of Communist states were made but never proven, and were always rejected by the militants in books and interviews. In June 1974, the Red Brigades killed two members of the Italian neo-fascist party, Movimento Sociale Italiano (MSI), during a raid on the MSI headquarters in Padua.

== 1974 arrest of BR founders ==
In September 1974, Curcio and Franceschini were arrested by General Carlo Alberto Dalla Chiesa, and sentenced to eighteen years in prison. The arrest was made possible by "Frate Mitra", alias Silvano Girotto, a former monk who had infiltrated the BR for the Italian security services. Curcio was freed from prison by an armed commando of the BR, led by his wife Cagol, but was rearrested sometime later.

== Expansion and radicalization ==
After 1974, the Red Brigades expanded into Rome, Genoa, and Venice, their numbers grew drastically and began to diversify in their criminal ventures. The BR operated some high-profile political kidnappings (e.g. Genoa judge Mario Sossi) and kidnapped industrialists (e.g. Vallarino Gancia) in order to obtain ransom money which (together with bank robberies) were their main source of income. Its 1975 manifesto stated that its goal was a "concentrated strike against the heart of the State, because the state is an imperialist collection of multinational corporations". The SIM (Stato Imperialista delle Multinazionali) became a primary target.

In 1975, the Carabinieri discovered a farmhouse where Gancia was kept prisoner by the BR (Cascina Spiotta). In the ensuing gunfight, two police officers were killed, as was Cagol. That following April, the BR announced that they had set up a Communist Combatant Party to "guide the working class". Terrorist activities, especially against Carabinieri and magistrates, increased considerably in order to terrorize juries and cause mistrials in cases against imprisoned leaders of the organization. Also, since arrested members of the BR refused to be defended by lawyers, lawyers designated by the courts to defend them (difensori d' ufficio) were also targeted and killed. Amongst jurists, Professor Fausto Cuocolo was also attacked in 1979, during an exam at University of Genoa; it was the first time that the BR attacked in a school. Their weaponry came mainly from the stocks of the Italian Resistance during the Second World War.

=== Kidnapping and murder of Aldo Moro ===
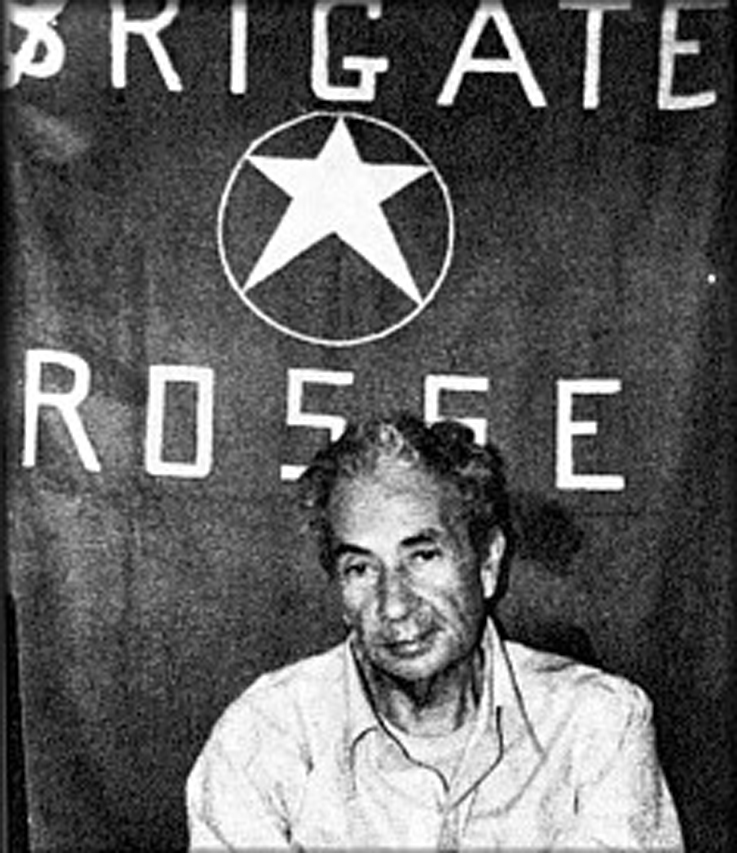
Moro photographed during his detention by the Red Brigades

In 1978, the Second BR, headed by Mario Moretti, kidnapped and murdered Christian Democracy (DC) president Aldo Moro, who was the key figure in negotiations aimed at extending the Italian government's parliamentary majority, by attaining a Historic Compromise between the DC and the Italian Communist Party (PCI). A team of BR members, using stolen Alitalia airline company uniforms, ambushed Moro, killed five of his bodyguards and took him captive. The captors, headed by Moretti, sought the release of certain prisoners in exchange for Moro's safe release. The government refused to negotiate with the captors, while Italian political forces took either a hard line (linea della fermezza) or one open to negotiating (linea del negoziato). All major political forces except the Italian Socialist Party led by Bettino Craxi and the extra-parliamentary left took the hard line. From his captivity, Moro sent letters to his family, to his political friends and to the Pope Paul VI, pleading for a negotiated outcome. In his appeal to the BR, Pope Paul VI asked them to release Moro "without conditions". The specified "without conditions" is controversial; according to some sources, it was added to Paul VI's letter against his will, and the pope instead wanted to negotiate with the kidnappers. According to Antonio Mennini, Pope Paul VI had saved £10 billion to pay a ransom to the BR in order to save Moro.

After holding Moro for 54 days, the BR realized that the government would not negotiate. Fearful of being discovered, they decided to kill their prisoner. They placed him in a car and told him to cover himself with a blanket. Moretti then shot him eleven times in the chest. Moro's body was left in the trunk of a car in Via Caetani, a site midway between the DC and PCI headquarters, as a last symbolic challenge to the police, who were keeping the entire nation, and Rome in particular, under strict surveillance. Moretti wrote in Brigate Rosse: una storia italiana that the murder of Moro was the last expression of Marxist–Leninist revolutionary action. Franceschini wrote that the imprisoned members did not understand why Moro had been chosen as a target. Moro was killed for his value as a symbolic representation of everything the BR opposed, rather than anything to do with his individual actions or beliefs.

Moro's assassination caused a strong reaction against the BR by the Italian law enforcement and security forces. The murder of a popular political figure also drew condemnation from other Italian left-wing militant formations and even the imprisoned ex-leaders of the group. The BR suffered a loss of support. Another crucial turning point was the 1979 murder of Guido Rossa, a member of the PCI and a trade union organizer. Rossa had observed the distribution of BR propaganda and had reported those involved to the police. He was shot and killed by the BR; this attack against a popular trade union organiser proved disastrous, totally alienating the factory worker base to which BR propaganda was primarily directed. In the words of Ezio Mauro of La Repubblica, the events were "Italy's 11th of September". It was the apogee of Italy's Years of Lead.

Italian police made a large number of arrests in 1980 when 12,000 far-left militants were detained while 300 fled to France and 200 to South America; a total of 600 people left Italy. Most leaders arrested including Faranda, Franceschini, Moretti, and Morucci either retracted their doctrine (as dissociati) or collaborated with investigators in the capture of other BR members (as collaboratori di giustizia), obtaining important reductions in prison sentences. The best-known collaboratore di giustizia was Patrizio Peci, one of the leaders of the Turin "column". In revenge, the BR assassinated his brother Roberto in 1981, significantly damaging the standing of the group and lowering them in the public's eyes to little more than a supposedly radical Cosa Nostra.

On 7 April 1979, the operaismo philosopher Antonio Negri was arrested along with the other persons associated with the Autonomist movement, including Oreste Scalzone. Padua's public prosecutor, Pietro Calogero, accused those involved in the Autonomia movement of being the political wing of the BR. Negri was charged with a number of offences including leadership of the BR, masterminding the kidnapping and murder of Moro and plotting to overthrow the government. At the time, Negri was a political science professor at the University of Padua and visiting lecturer at Paris' École Normale Supérieure. Thus, French philosophers Félix Guattari and Gilles Deleuze signed in November 1977 L'Appel des intellectuels français contre la répression en Italie (The Call of French Intellectuals Against Repression in Italy) in protest against Negri's imprisonment and Italian anti-terrorism legislation. A year later, Negri was exonerated from Moro's kidnapping. No link was ever established between Negri and the BR and almost all of the charges against him (including seventeen murders) were dropped within months of his arrest due to lack of evidence. Moro's assassination continues to haunt Italy today, and remains a significant event of the Cold War. In the 1980s–1990s, a parliamentary commission headed by senator Giovanni Pellegrino investigated acts of terrorism in Italy during the Years of Lead, while various judicial investigations also took place, headed by Guido Salvini and other magistrates.

On 23 January 1983, an Italian court sentenced 32 members of the BR to life imprisonment for their role in the kidnapping and murder of Moro, among other crimes. Many elements and facts have never been fully cleared up, despite a series of trials, and this led to a number of other alternative theories about the events to become popularized.

== BR in the 1980s ==
Much of the BR was dismantled by the security services in the 1980s.

=== Kidnapping of Brigadier General Dozier ===
On 17 December 1981, four members of the BR, posing as plumbers, invaded the Verona apartment of U.S. Army Brigadier General, James L. Dozier, then NATO deputy chief of staff at Southern European land forces. The men kidnapped Dozier and left his wife bound and chained in their apartment. He was held for 42 days until 28 January 1982, when a team of NOCS (a special operations unit of the Italian police) successfully carried out his rescue from an apartment in Padua, without firing a shot, capturing the entire terrorist cell. The guard, Ugo Milani, assigned to kill Dozier in the event of a rescue attempt did not do so and was overwhelmed by the rescuing force. Dozier was the first American general to be kidnapped by insurgents and the first foreigner kidnapped by the BR. After Dozier's return to the US Army in Vicenza, he was congratulated by telephone by U.S. president Ronald Reagan on regaining his freedom.

=== Mulinaris's 1983 arrest ===
After Abbé Pierre's death in January 2007, Italian magistrate Carlo Mastelloni recalled in the Corriere della Sera that the Abbé had "spontaneously testified" in the 1980s in support of a group of Italian activists who had fled to Paris and were involved with the Hyperion language school, directed by Vanni Mulinaris. Simone de Beauvoir had also written a letter to Mastelloni, which has been kept in juridical archives. Some of those associated with the Hyperion School, which included Corrado Simioni, Vanni Mulinaris, and Duccio Berio, were accused by the Italian authorities of being the "masterminds" of the BR, although they were all cleared afterwards.

After Mulinaris travelled to Udine and was subsequently arrested by the Italian police, Abbé Pierre went to talk in 1983 with Italian President Sandro Pertini to plead Mulinaris's cause. Mulinaris had been imprisoned on a charge of assisting the BR. Abbé had even observed eight days of a hunger strike from 26 May to 3 June 1984 in the Cathedral of Turin to protest the conditions suffered by "Brigadists" in Italian prisons and the imprisonment without trial of Mulinaris, who was recognized as innocent some time afterwards. Mulinaris's treatment was, according to the Abbé, a "violation of human rights". La Repubblica specified that Italian justice has recognized the innocence of all people close to the Hyperion School.

=== Red Brigades-PCC and Red Brigades-UCC 1981 split ===
By 1981, the BR had split into two factions: the majority faction of the Communist Combatant Party (Red Brigades-PCC, led by Barbara Balzerani) and the minority of the Union of Combatant Communists (Red Brigades-UCC, led by Giovanni Senzani). In 1984, the group claimed responsibility for the murder of Leamon Hunt, United States chief of the Sinai Multinational Force and Observer Group. In the same year, Curcio, Moretti, Iannelli and Bertolazzi rejected the armed struggle as pointless.

In the 1980s, the arrest rate increased in Italy, including that of Senzani in 1982 and of Balzerani in 1985. In February 1986, the Red Brigades-PCC killed the ex-mayor of Florence Lando Conti. In March 1987, Red Brigades-UCC assassinated General Licio Giorgieri in Rome. On 16 April 1988, in Forlì, Red Brigades-PCC killed Italian Senator Roberto Ruffilli, an advisor of Italian Prime Minister Ciriaco de Mita. After that, the group activities all but ended after massive arrests of its leadership. The BR dissolved themselves in 1988.

=== Flight to France ===
In 1985 some Italian members living in France returned to Italy. The same year, French President François Mitterrand guaranteed immunity from extradition to BR members living in France who had made a break from their past, were not sentenced for violent crimes and had started a new life. In 1998, Bordeaux's appeal court decided that Sergio Tornaghi could not be extradited to Italy, on the grounds that Italian procedure would not let him be judged again, after a trial during his absence. In 2002, Paris extradited Paolo Persichetti, an ex-member of the Red Brigades who was teaching sociology, signalling for the first time a departure from the "Mitterrand doctrine". In the 2000s, requests by Italian Justice for extradition from France involved several leftist activists, including Negri, Cesare Battisti, and others. This doctrine was based on the idea that the special laws (incarceration on the basis of mere suspicion, interrogations taking place without the presence of a lawyer, equal punishment for individuals belonging to the same group regardless of the nature of the offences committed individually, etc.) adopted by the Italian authorities to combat terrorists ran counter to the French conception of law.

While leftists had mostly fled to France, many neo-fascist activists involved in the strategy of tension, such as Vincenzo Vinciguerra and Stefano Delle Chiaie, fled to Spain; Delfo Zorzi, condemned for the Piazza Fontana bombing, was granted asylum and citizenship in Japan, while others fled to Argentina, in particular Augusto Canchi, who was wanted by Italian justice for his role in the 1980 Bologna massacre. The issue of a general amnesty in Italy for these crimes is highly controversial and still source of dispute. Most political forces oppose it, in particular the associations of victims of terrorism and their family members. In April 2021, seven fugitive Italians were arrested in France, six of whom were identified as members of the Red Brigades. The move was described as a turning point in French-Italian relations, with an advisor of French President Emmanuel Macron stating that "it was a way for us to show responsibility, recognise this part of Italian history and stop turning a blind eye to the violent acts perpetrated between the mid-60s and the 80s."

== Late 1990s resurgence and murders ==
A new group, with few links, if any, with the old BR, appeared in the late 1990s. The Red Brigades-PCC in 1999 murdered Massimo D'Antona, an advisor to the cabinet of Prime Minister Massimo D'Alema. On 19 March 2002, the same gun was used to kill professor Marco Biagi, an economic advisor to Italian Prime Minister Silvio Berlusconi. The Red Brigades-PCC again claimed responsibility. On 3 March 2003, two followers, Mario Galesi and Nadia Desdemona Lioce, started a firefight with a police patrol on a train at Castiglion Fiorentino station, near Arezzo. Galesi and Emanuele Petri (one of the policemen) were killed, and Lioce was arrested.

On 23 October 2003, Italian police arrested six members of the Red Brigades in early-dawn raids in Florence, Sardinia, Rome and Pisa in connection with the murder of Massimo D'Antona. On 1 June 2005, four members of the Red Brigades-PCC were condemned to life sentence in Bologna for the murder of Marco Biagi: Nadia Lioce, Roberto Morandi, Marco Mezzasalma and Diana Blefari Melazzi.

Several figures from the 1970s, including philosopher Antonio Negri who was wrongly accused of being the mastermind of the BR, have called for a new analysis of the events which happened during the Years of Lead in Italy. On the other hand, BR founder Alberto Franceschini declared after his release from an 18-year prison term that the BR "continue to exist because we never proceeded to their funeral", calling for truth from every involved party in order to be able to turn the page.

== Later developments ==
In October 2007, a former BR commander was arrested after committing a bank robbery while out of prison on good conduct terms. On 1 October 2007, Cristoforo Piancone, who is serving a life sentence for six murders, managed to steal €170,000 from the bank Monte dei Paschi di Siena with an accomplice.

On 28 April 2021, French police detained members of the Red Brigades, as well as a co-founder of the Lotta Continua.

In August 2024 Leonardo Bertulazzi was arrested in Buenos Aires. He had been tried and convicted in absentia for the kidnapping of the naval engineer Piero Costa in 1977. In November 2026, Bertulazzi escaped house arrest.

== Statistics ==
According to Clarence A. Martin, the BR were credited with 14,000 acts of violence in the first ten years of the group's existence. According to statistics by Italy's Ministry of Interior, a total of 75 people are thought to have been murdered by the BR. A majority of the murders were politically motivated, though a number of assassinations of random police and Carabinieri officers took place, as well as a number of murders occurring during criminal ventures such as bank robberies and kidnappings.

== Foreign support ==
Romanian defector Ion Mihai Pacepa claimed that the Red Brigades' primary foreign support came from the Czechoslovak StB and the Palestine Liberation Organization (PLO). Soviet and Czechoslovak small arms and explosives came from the Middle East via heroin traffickers along well-established smuggling routes. Pacepa further claimed logistic support and training were carried out directly by the Czechoslovak StB both in Prague and at remote PLO training camps in North Africa and Syria. Smuggled Czechoslovak-made Škorpion submachine pistols were used by the Red Brigades in many of their attacks, including the ambush of Aldo Moro's motorcade (and his later murder), the Acca Larentia killings, a 1982 ambush on an army patrol in Salerno, as well as the murders of Roberto Peci, Diplomat Leamon Hunt, and Commissioner Antonio Esposito.

Russian defector Vasili Mitrokhin claimed that, aware of the involvement and fearing retaliation due to their own involvement with the KGB, the Italian Communist Party lodged several complaints with the Soviet ambassador in Rome regarding Czechoslovak support of the Red Brigades, but the Soviets were supposedly either unwilling or unable to stop the StB. This was one of several contributing factors in ending the alleged covert relationship that the Italian Communist Party had with the KGB, culminating with a total break in 1979.

According to Pacepa, support for the Red Brigades was a major part of the operations of UDBA, the intelligence service of non-aligned communist Yugoslavia. Yugoslav connection with underground leftist movements in Italy began in the mid-1960s with the intent of destabilizing NATO, and ties were allegedly established with the Red Brigades immediately following the group's founding in 1970. The UDBA chief in charge of relations with the Red Brigades was, in Pacepa's account, Silvo Gorenc, a close associate of Josip Broz Tito, the leader of Yugoslavia. Gorenc was supposedly proud of Yugoslavia's close yet clandestine relationship with the Red Brigades, though he allegedly insisted the government could and would not attempt to influence the group to avoid executing Aldo Moro, despite Romanian leader Nicolae Ceaușescu's pleas for Yugoslav intervention.

Italian journalist Loretta Napoleoni said in a TED Talk that she spoke to a "part-timer" with the Red Brigades who claimed that he used to sail between Lebanon and Italy during summers, ferrying Soviet weapons for a fee from the PLO to Sardinia where the weapons were distributed to "other organizations in Europe".

== In popular culture ==
Joe Strummer of The Clash frequently wore a Red Brigade shirt in the early punk rock period. He also wore the shirt in the film Rude Boy.

A historical book about the Red Brigades was written by John Foot and published in July 2025.

== See also ==
- Girolamo Minervini
- Il sangue dei leoni
- Informal Anarchist Federation
- October 22 Group
- Prima Linea

== Bibliography ==
- Giovanni Fasanella and Alberto Franceschini (with a postface from Judge Rosario Priore, who investigated Aldo Moro's death), Che cosa sono le BR. I Miserabili ("Brigades Rouges. L'Histoire secrète des Red Brigades racontée par leur fondateur, Alberto Franceschini. Entretien avec Giovanni Fasanella". Editions Panama, 2005 a review by Le Monde and another review by L'Humanité
- A Giovanni Fasanella's bibliography
- Terrorist Group Profiles, Dudley Knox Library, Naval Postgraduate School.
- Antonio Cerella, Il ritorno della violenza – Le BR dal ventennio rosso al XXI secolo, Roma: Il Filo, 2007.
- Amedeo Benedetti, Il linguaggio delle nuove Brigate Rosse, Genova: Erga, 2002.
- Yonah Alexander and Dennis A. Pluchinsky. Europe's Red Terrorists: The fighting Communist Organizations, Routledge, October 1992.
- Indro Montanelli and Mario Cervi, L'Italia degli anni di piombo, Milan: Rizzoli, 1991; L'Italia degli anni di fango, Milan: Rizzoli, 1993.
