= Conspiracy theories about the kidnapping and murder of Aldo Moro =

On May 9, 1978, Aldo Moro, a Christian Democracy (DC) statesman who advocated for a Historic Compromise with the Italian Communist Party, (PCI), was murdered after 55 days of captivity by the Red Brigades (BR), a far-left terrorist organization. Although the courts established that the BR had acted alone, conspiracy theories related to the Moro case persist, because of the fact that the assassination of Aldo Moro ended the possibility of communism co-governing one of the main economies of the West, something that neither Washington nor Moscow wanted. Most of the conspiracy theories allege additional involvement, ranging from the Italian government itself, its secret services being involved with the BR, the Propaganda Due (P2) Masonic lodge, the CIA, Henry Kissinger, Mossad, and the KGB.

Because there remains several unclear aspects and it is widely acknowledged, including by the judges themselves, that there were failures on the part of the police, conspiracy theories are widely popular despite five trials in Rome's Court of Assizes that ended with many life sentences and two parliamentary commissions, among others inquiries. Conspiracy theorists hold that Moro, a progressive who wanted the PCI to be part of government, was ultimately sacrificed due to Cold War politics, that both sides welcomed his kidnapping, and that, by refusing to negotiate, they led to his death. The judges investigating the Moro affair dismissed these conspiracy theories, arguing that there is no evidence to support those interpretations of the Moro murder case, and while acknowledging that Moro had powerful political enemies, they insisted that conspiracy theorists had made too many assumptions. At the same time the judicial truth has changed several times and the last parliamentary commission, that concluded its works in 2018, established that the sentences were based mainly on the confession of Valerio Moretti and that the elements in open contradiction with his version, i.e. where the cars were left after the kidnapping, were downplayed.

Twenty years after Moro's death, such conspiracy theories remained popular. Few Italians believed in the official version of the Moro affair, namely that only the Red Brigades bore responsibility for Moro's murder and that the Italian government did its best to save Moro. In August 2020, about sixty individuals from the world of historical research and political inquiry signed a document denouncing the growing weight that the conspiratorial view on the kidnapping and killing of Moro has in public discourse.

== Alleged involvement of the P2, Gladio, and the Italian intelligence services ==
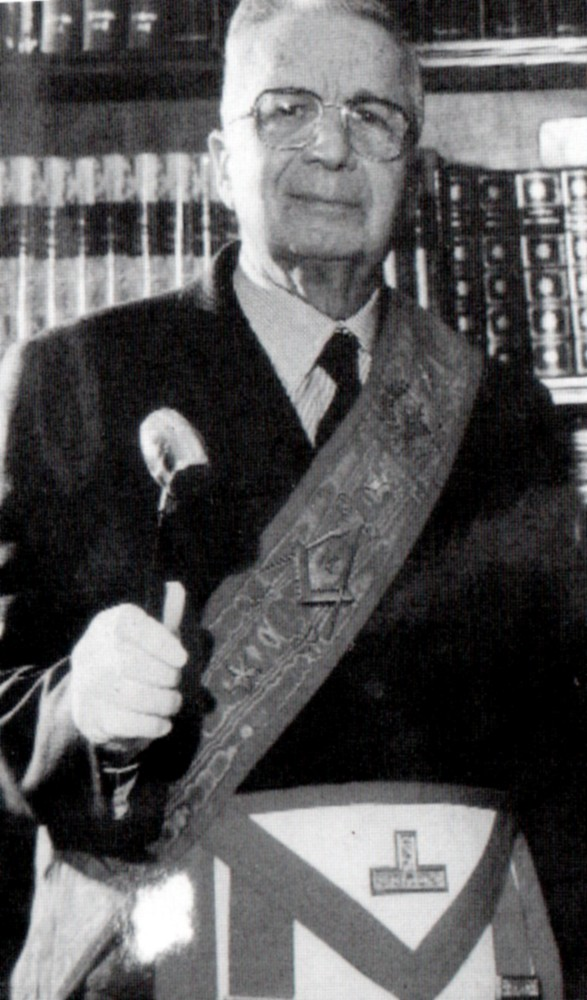
Licio Gelli, the Venerable Master of the P2 Masonic lodge

Several authorities have suggested that P2 was involved in the kidnapping of Moro, and that the actions of the P2 were already known before Moro's death, and before the public revelation of the P2's existence in March 1981. The name of Andreotti has been repeatedly associated with numerous members of the P2, notably with the Italian mafia banker Michele Sindona and its founder Licio Gelli, with whom he was well acquainted. The P2 was a secret Masonic lodge involved in numerous financial and political scandals in Italy in the 1970s and 1980s and that featured as its members entrepreneurs, journalists, numerous high exponents of right-wing parties, the Italian police and military forces. Among others, they included future prime minister Silvio Berlusconi, the Carabinieri general Carlo Alberto dalla Chiesa (who made an admission request whose result is unknown), Vito Miceli (chief of SIOS), Sindona, and Vittorio Emanuele di Savoia, the pretender to the throne of Italy. Many high-ranking secret services members were also members of the P2, as were members of the committee that had to coordinate the searches for Moro. Another theory supposes that the BR had been infiltrated by the CIA or by the Operation Gladio, a paramilitary clandestine network headed by NATO whose main task was to oppose Soviet influence in Western Europe, including the rise of the PCI and their road to government.

All documents related to the P2 were published on 7 May 1981. The P2 was dissolved in 1982, with a law that also made the establishment of secret lodges with similar purposes illegal in Italy. Gelli, who since 2005 was no longer put on house arrest, said that the P2 was acquitted in the three levels of trial of the charges of conspiracy against the state, and Italian Freemasons cite the Strasbourg Court, which in 2001 condemned the Italian government for having violated the right of association guaranteed by the Article 11 of the European Convention on Human Rights with a law that required some public officials to declare their membership of a lodge. Most historians agree that the role of this deviant Freemasonry has not been completely clarified.

During the days of Moro's imprisonment, journalist Carmine Pecorelli wrote in his magazine Osservatorio politico an article entitled "Vergogna, buffoni!" ("Shame on you, clowns!"). In it, he wrote that Andreotti had met dalla Chiesa, who told him that he knew the location where Moro was kept but did not obtain the authorization to proceed to free him due to, in Pecorelli's words, a certain "Christ's lodge in Paradise", which analysts immediately identified with the P2. The likely allusion to the P2 became clear after the discovery of a list of the lodge members on 17 March 1981. Members of the lodge occupied important institutional positions and included Giuseppe Santovito, who was director of SISMI (Italy's military intelligence agency); prefect Walter Pelosi, who was director of CESIS; general Giulio Grassini of SISDE; admiral Antonino Geraci, who was the commander of SIOS; Federico Umberto D'Amato, who was director of the Office of Reserved Affairs of the Ministry of the Interiors; generals Raffaele Giudice and Donato Lo Prete, who were respectively commander and chief-of-staff of the Guardia di Finanza; and the Carabinieri general Giuseppe Siracusano, who was responsible for road blocks in the capital during the investigations of the Moro affair.

According to Vincenzo Cappelletti (a professor who took part in the crisis committees), Franco Ferracuti, who was later discovered to be a P2 member and declared that Moro was suffering of the Stockholm syndrome towards his kidnappers, was close to the lodge during the kidnapping days, having been introduced by Grassini. Gelli declared that the presence of numerous P2 members in the committees was casual, since numerous personalities were members at the time, and this was simply a statistic reflected by the composition of the committees. According to Gelli, some members of the committees did not know that some of their colleagues were also part of the P2.

On 16 March 1978, the day of Moro's kidnapping, the most important members of the P2 met in the Hotel Excelsior in Rome, which was a few hundred meters from the U.S. Embassy in Rome. While exiting the hotel, Gelli declared "the most difficult part is done". It was supposed that his words referred to the abduction of Moro. Another debated case was regarding the presence of Camillo Guglielmi, a colonel of SISMI's 7th Division that controlled Operation Gladio and who was nicknamed "Papà", in via Stresa near the location of the ambush, and in those exact minutes when the BR kidnapped Moro. His presence was kept secret and was only disclosed in 1990 during the investigation of the Italian Parliament's commission on state massacres (the stragi di Stato as part of the strategy of tension in Italy). Guglielmi admitted that he was in via Stresa but only because he had been invited to lunch by a colleague. According to several sources, the colleague confirmed that Guglielmi came to his house but had not been invited. Furthermore, Italians normally have lunch at around 12:30 and Guglielmi's presence at around 09:00 would not be justified. Other sources list Guglielmi as a true member of Gladio; he always firmly denied this accusation. His direct superior, the general Pietro Musumeci, was a member of the P2 and was condemned for sidetracking the investigations on the 1980 Bologna station bombing.

The discovery of the BR refuge in via Gradoli saw the participation of members of both P2 and the police forces of Italy. Lucia Mokbel, an informer of SISDE, had communicated that she had heard Morse code messages coming from the flat next to her. It turned out that those noises interpreted as Morse were in fact coming from the electric typewriter used by the terrorists to type their demand letters. She informed the police commissar Elio Coppa, who was enlisted in the P2. When police agents went to the flat and knocked on the door, they did not attempt to enter it and left the place. SISDE had been also informed that a lock-up garage in via Gradoli had an antenna, allegedly used by the terrorist to communicate with the area of Lago della Duchessa. Grassini, the head of SISDE and member of the P2, did not take any investigative measures.

Investigations made by DIGOS discovered that several machines used by the terrorists to print their communications from one year before the kidnapping of Moro, which was financed by Mario Moretti, had been previously owned by the Italian state. These included a printer owned by the Raggruppamento Unità Speciali dell'Esercito. Despite its relatively young age and its high value, it had been sold out as scrap. A photocopier was previously owned by the Italy's Ministry of Transportation, and was acquired in 1969 and later sold to Enrico Triaca, a member of the BR.

The apartment in via Gradoli, which had been rented by Moretti under the pseudonym of Mario Borghi since 1978, and its building housed several apartments owned by SISDE men and one inhabited by a police confidant. During the days of the kidnapping, the palace was inspected by Carabinieri under the colonel Antonio Varisco, with the exclusion of Moretti's apartment; the official justification was that the Carabinieri were not authorized to enter the apartments if no one was inside. Luciana Bozzi, the owner of the apartment, was later discovered to be a friend of Giuliana Conforto, whose father was named in the Mitrokhin list of the KGB. Valerio Morucci and Adriana Faranda were eventually arrested in her flat. Pecorelli wrote a postcard to Moretti in 1977 from Ascoli Piceno (Moretti was born in the province of Ascoli), addressing it to one "Borghi at via Gradoli", with the message "Greetings, brrrr".

In June 2008, the Venezuelan terrorist Ilich Ramírez Sánchez, best known as "Carlos the Jackal", spoke in an interview released to the Italian press agency ANSA declaring that several men of the SISMI, led by the colonel Stefano Giovannone (who was considered near to Moro), negotiated at the airport in Beirut for his liberation during the night of 8 to 9 May 1978; the agreement would have endorsed the liberation of several imprisoned members of the BR to the Popular Front for the Liberation of Palestine in the territory of an Arabic country. According to Ramírez Sánchez, the agreement, which found the opposition of the SISMI leading figures, failed because news about it leaked to other Western secret services who, in turn, informed SISMI. Moro was killed the following day. Ramírez Sánchez stated that the officers involved in the attempt were all expelled from the services, being forced to resign or to go into compulsory retirement on a pension.

== Involvement of foreign powers ==
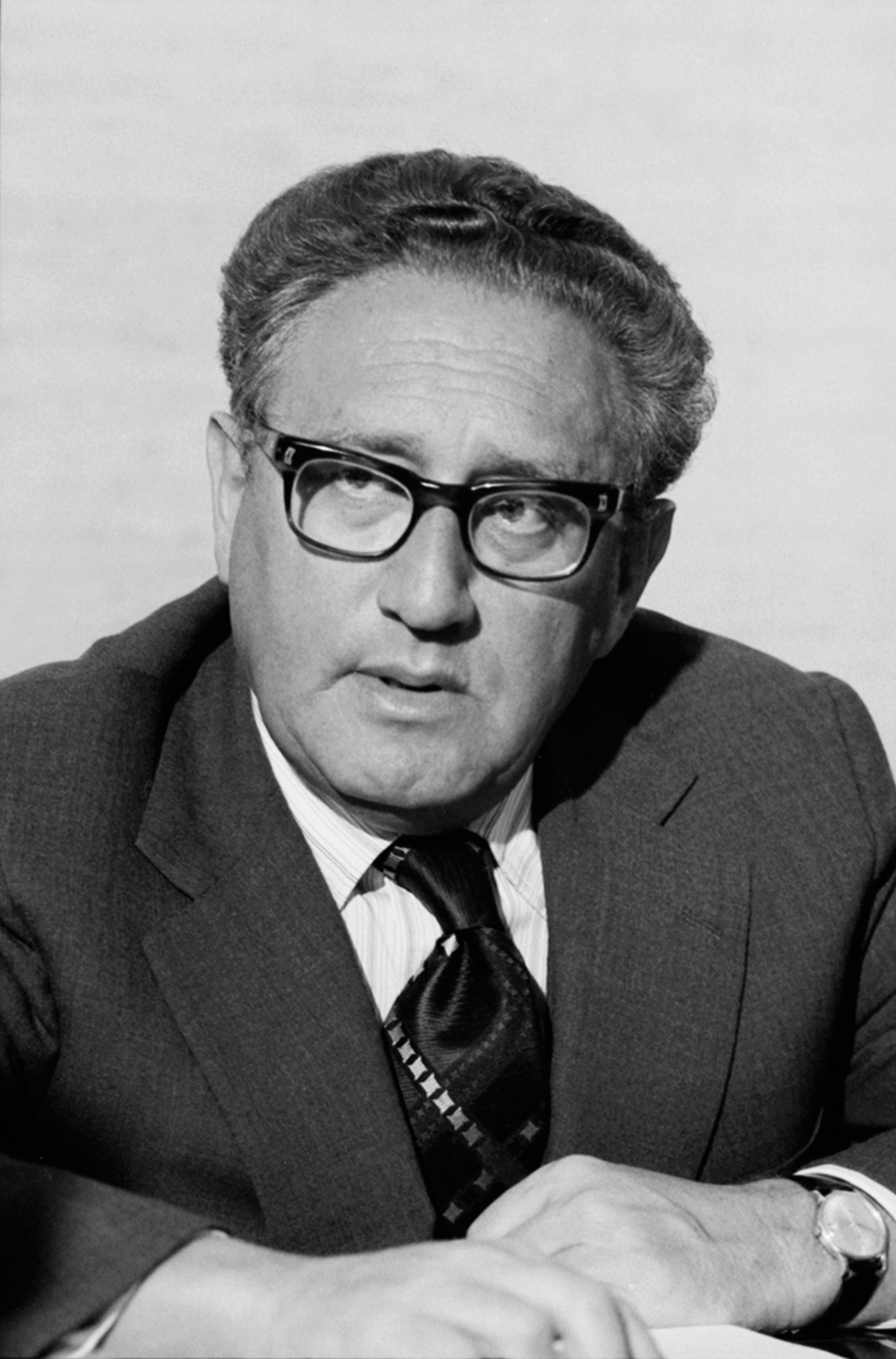
Henry Kissinger in 1976

Into the 21st century, the Moro affair continued to be a focus of Italian politics. In 2003, Philip Willan wrote for The Guardian: "Both Moscow and Washington opposed Moro's policy as dangerously destabilising for the postwar European order which the great powers sanction at the Yalta conference in 1945. Suspicion continues to this day that the CIA or KGB, possibly both, may have played a role in his violent removal from the political scene. At the very least, they did nothing to secure his release."

Conspiracy theories related to the involvement of foreign powers implicate the CIA, Mossad, and the KGB, including within the BR. Declassified documents showed that foreign powers, such as Britain, were concerned about the PCI being part of the Italian government and discussed the possibility of a coup to remove the PCI, which they feared would win the 1976 Italian general election. Although there was no coup, the fact that Moro died two years later fuelled conspiracy theories. In 2005, Giovanni Galloni, the former national vice-secretary of the DC, said that, during a discussion with Moro about the difficulty to find the BR's bases, Moro told him that he knew of the presence of United States and Israeli intelligence agents infiltrated within the BR. The information obtained was not given to the Italian investigators. He also declared that the reason of the assassination of Pecorelli was the same information, perhaps coming from the United States. During an interview in front of the Italian Parliament's commission on terrorism, Galloni also stated that during his trip to the United States in 1976 he had been told that a government like that envisaged by Moro, which would have included the PCI, would be opposed at any cost by the Republican Party in the United States.

According to Moro's widow and his collaborators, Moro's trip to the United States as foreign minister in 1974 and his meeting with Kissinger upset him so much that he thought of leaving politics. According to some collaborators of Moro, he was "very shaken by the meeting he had with the Secretary of State, Henry Kissinger. So much so that the following day in the Church of St. Patrick he felt ill and said he wanted to interrupt for a long time political activity." In general, the Historic Compromise of Moro with the PCI was not well seen by both the United States and the Soviet Union. During the 1983 trial against the BR, Moro's widow declared that her husband was unpopular in the United States due to the Historic Compromise, and that he had been repeatedly warned by American politicians to stop disrupting the political situation which had been established in the Yalta Conference, in reference to the possible executive role of the PCI. According to her, Kissinger was one of the American personalities who menaced Moro in 1974 and 1976. She said that the words to Moro that he repeated to her were that "you have to put an end to your political plan of mustering all the forces in your country to collaborate directly. Here, or you stop doing this thing, or you will be badly punished." Kissinger denied these accusations, and it was argued it was an issue of communication and language.

Flamigni suggested the involvement of the Operation Gladio network directed by NATO. He asserted that Gladio had manipulated Moretti as a way to take over the Red Brigades to effect a strategy of tension aimed at creating popular demand for a new, right-wing law-and-order regime. In the updated edition of his book Un affare di Stato. Il delitto Moro e la fine della Prima repubblica (A State Affair: The Moro Murder and the End of the First Republic), the journalist Andrea Colombo wrote that "the Moro kidnapping hides inscrutable plots involving practically all the actors involved in the Italian and world theatre: the CIA, the Stasi, the Czechoslovak secret services, Mossad, the P2, the diverted Italian [secret] services, Gladio, the Vatican IOR, a mysterious super-secret service known as the 'ring', the Mafia, the 'Ndrangheta, the Magliana gang, and the Palestinians." Writing for Il Sussidiario in 2014, the journalist Luciano Garibaldi cited Alberto Franceschini and Renzo Martinelli's 2003 film titled Five Moons Square, and concluded: "Reasonings that confirm Martinelli's hypothesis. Moro's kidnappers were manipulated unknowingly, but someone knew everything. Not for nothing, the numbers of the Moro case are as follows: 23 sentences, 127 convictions, 27 life sentences. But there is no longer anyone in jail. All free. Evidently, the CIA or the KGB (or both) have respected the pacts." The lawyer Giannino Guiso, a confidant of Bettino Craxi and defender of the historical leaders of the BR, declared that "the terrorists already convicted or awaiting conviction have done everything to save the life of Aldo Moro". The essence of his reasoning is that something prevented them from reaching an agreement. Guiso asked: "Could the CIA have played a decisive role?" He also stated: "Moro was not saved because he did not want to be saved. The BR went so far as to kill the president of the DC because they were forced to do so. So someone (internal or external) forced them to behave that way." The historian Agostini Giovagnoli commented: "The responsibility for Moro's death lies with those who killed him, his companions and their supporters, as well as their national and international occult instigators."

Franceschini, one of the founders of the BR, mentioned the possibility that the Red Brigades had been infiltrated by Israeli agents as early as 1974. He reported a confidence told to him by co-founder Renato Curcio, according to whom Moretti would be an infiltrated agent. Curcio always denied this reconstruction. Moretti took the reins of the Red Brigades after Franceschini and Curcio were arrested in the mid-1970s, introducing a far stronger militarization of the organization's activities. Prior to 1974, the BR had limited themselves to demonstrative acts that did not involve violence. In the Italian RAI TV programme La notte della Repubblica, Moretti denied these accusations, saying that he had never seen an Israeli in his life and that it was wrong to think that the change of the BR's strategy depended from the arrest of some militants. He also added: "The hypothesis that the Red Brigades have been manipulated by anyone is a thesis dear to the conspiracy, which would divide the BR into good and bad." In a 2012 interview with Ulisse Spinnato Vega of Agenzia Clorofilla, Franceschini and Curcio remembered Pecorelli. Franceschini stated: "Pecorelli, before dying, said that both the United States and the Soviet Union wanted Moro's death." Observers question why Moretti would suffer forty years of prison if the BR were infiltrated by the secret services. Brigate Rosse: un diario politico (Red Brigades: A Political Diary), edited by the researcher Silvia De Bernardinis, takes a critical and self-critical account of the group's history by some leaders and militants, and reiterates that there were only the Red Brigades behind the group, as did Marco Bellocchio's 2020 Exterior Night drama film about Moro's kidnapping and death.

In January 2008, La Repubblica published documents obtained from Britain's National Archives, in which Foreign Office planners wrote in May 1976 that "a clean surgical coup" to remove the PCI from power "would be attractive in many ways" but concluded that the idea was not realistic since it could lead to what they described as a "prolonged and bloody" resistance by communists in Italy and a potential civil war that could have included an intervention by the Soviet Union. Guy Millard, the British ambassador to Rome, wrote in a memo quoted by La Repubblica that "(Berlinguer's) entry into government would create a serious problem for Nato and the European Community and could turn out to be an event with catastrophic consequences". A Foreign Office memo in April 1976 had listed options for tackling the PCI ascendancy, which ranged from financing rival parties to "subversive or military intervention against the Italian Communist party". While officials said that "in the right circumstances" they could encourage the Italian government to repress the PCI and suggested "it might be worth" arranging pretexts for this, they also advised they could "orchestrate a campaign" against Berlinguer and the PCI, recommending "increased action in the propaganda field, both overt and covert, to undermine the credibility of the PCI". Fears receded as the PCI did not become the largest party. Heulyn Dunlop, an official of the Information Research Department's Special Editorial Unit, which was a secret department, seconded to Rome for the campaign to disseminate disinformation against the PCI, identified the key development as "a largely spontaneous and effective campaign" by the Italian press, which alerted Italians "to the dangers of voting the PCI into power". Il golpe inglese. Da Matteotti a Moro: le prove della guerra segreta per il controllo del petrolio e dell'Italia (The English Coup: From Matteotti to Moro. Evidence of the Secret War for the Control of Oil and Italy), a 2011 book by Mario Cereghino and Giovanni Fasanella, who had access to declassified documents, showed that, apart from his accommodation to the PCI, Britain was also opposed to Moro for his pro-Arab policies.

== False Communication No. 7 and discovery of the base of via Gradoli ==
Another controversial event occurred on 18 April 1978 when a false BR's Communication No. 7 announced the death of Moro and that he had been on the bottom of Lago della Duchessa, a very small mountain lake in the province of Rieti (north of Rome). In response, the Italian police looked in vain for Moro under the iced surface of the lake. The authors of the false communication included Antonio Chichiarelli, a notorious forger from Rome who was connected to the Banda della Magliana gang of the city. Chichiarelli later issued further false communications from the Red Brigades. He was killed in uncertain circumstances in September 1984 when his connection with the false communiqué had been yet entirely clarified.

Chichiarelli spoke of the communication to several people, including Luciano Dal Bello, a confidant of the Carabinieri and of SISDE. Del Bello reported the facts but no investigation on Chichiarelli followed. On the same day, the police force found an apartment used as a base by the Red Brigades in Rome on via Gradoli 96. The discovery was allegedly due to a water leak, for which a neighbour had called the firemen. The leak was caused by a tap left open in the apartment's shower in an unusual fashion, i.e. with water directed against the wall. The base was normally used by Moretti but the Italian media reported the discovery immediately and he avoided returning there. The palace had been inspected by Carabinieri under Varisco, with the exclusion of Moretti's apartment; the official justification was that the Carabinieri were not authorized to enter the apartments if no one was inside. Bozzi was later discovered to be a friend of Conforto, in whose apartments Morucci and Faranda were later arrested. Elio Coppa, the commissar who had led Rome's police forces in the inspection of the building on via Gradoli, was eventually promoted to vice-director of SISDE; he later turned out to be a member of the P2. Mokbel was the neighbor whose call had led to the inspection; she was officially a university student of Egyptian descent and was later identified as a confidant of SISDE, or of the police. Furthermore, the report of the inspection, which was presented at the trial on the Moro affair, was written on a type of paper distributed to the Italian police only in 1981, three years after the events.

Before and after 1978, numerous apartments in the street had been used by Italian secret agents, including a Carabinieri Nucleo Operativo Centrale di Sicurezza enrolled by SISMI who resided in the building facing that of Moretti and who was from the same birthplace. In the street, there were also firms used by SISMI for its affairs. Moretti's apartment itself had been under observation by UCIGOS for several years previously as it had been frequented also by members of the far-left organizations Potere Operaio and Autonomia Operaia. Later, it was revealed that the DC parliament member Benito Cazora, during the contact he had with the 'Ndrangheta (the Calabrian mafia) in the attempt to find Moro's prison, had been warned that the area of via Gradoli was a "hot zone". Cazora received in the formation while stopping in his car at a crossroad between via Cassia and via Gradoli. Cazora had reported this warning to the DC and to the police.

On 20 April 1978, the Red Brigades issued the true Communication No. 7; they attached a photo of Moro holding a copy of La Repubblica, dated 19 April, showing that he was still alive. Pecorelli, who had likely knowledge of the presence of Moretti in via Gradoli, was one of the few journalists to immediately deny the authenticity of Communication No. 7, whereas most authorities had considered it true. Some thirty years after the events, Pieczenik declared in an interview that the decision to issue the false communication was taken during a meeting of the crisis committee, present at which were Francesco Cossiga, members of the Italian intelligence agencies, and Ferracuti. The alleged goal was to prepare the Italian and European audience for the likely death of Moro in the kidnapping. He stated that it would be ignored if the communication had been actually issued. Many years before its public revelation in 1990, it was also supposed that Moro had told his kidnappers of the existence of Operation Gladio. From this point of view, the false Communication No. 7 was a code message from sectors of the Italian secret agencies that Moro should not return alive from his imprisonment.

== Alleged séance ==
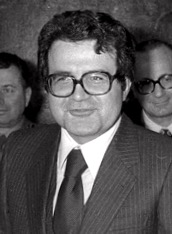
Romano Prodi in 1978

Also connected to via Gradoli is an event which involved Romano Prodi, Mario Baldassarri, and Alberto Clò. During an alleged séance in which they participated on 2 April 1978, after asking the soul of Giorgio La Pira about the location of Moro, a Ouija table they were using registered the words Viterbo, Bolsena, and Gradoli, three towns north of Rome. The information was trusted and a police group made an armed blitz in the town of Gradoli, 80 km from Rome, on the following day, 6 April, although Moro was not found. The supernatural element was generally not overlooked during the investigations. For example, the Italian government had engaged a diviner, hoping that he would find Moro's location. The police made another fruitless blitz in Viterbo after an abbess declared that, during a vision, she had seen him there.

Prodi spoke to the Italian Parliament's commission about the case in 1981. In the notes of the Italian Parliament's commission on terrorism, the séance is described as a fake, used to hide the true source of the information. In 1997, Andreotti declared that the information came from the Bologna section of Autonomia Operaia, a far-left organization with some ties with the BR, and that Cossiga also knew the true source. The judge Ferdinando Imposimato considered Andreotti's theory as possible but accused him of having kept information that could have been valuable in a trial about Moro's murder.

Moro's widow later declared that she had repeatedly informed the police that a via Gradoli existed in Rome; the investigators did not consider it — some replied to her that the street did not appear in Rome's maps. This is confirmed by other Moro relatives but strongly denied by Cossiga. In the 1990s, the séance matter was reopened by the Italian Parliament's commission on terrorism. While Prodi (then prime minister) declared that he had no time for an interview, both Baldassarri (then senator and vice-minister in two Silvio Berlusconi's cabinets) and Clò (minister of industry in Lamberto Dini's cabinet and owner of the house where the séance was performed) responded to the call; they confirmed the circumstances of the séance, and that Gradoli had appeared in several sessions, even if the participants had changed.

== Involvement of organized crime ==
In the years following Moro's murder, there have been numerous references to the presence of Calabrian 'Ndrangheta at via Fani. In an intercepted phone call between Sereno Freato, then Moro's personal secretary, and Benito Cazora, a DC parliament member who had been given the task to keep contacts with the Calabrian gangs, Freato asked for news about the prison of Moro. The 'Ndrangheta was in possession of several photos of the events in via Fani, some of which allegedly portrayed a "man known by them". According to what was reported by Cazora in 1991, some members of the 'Ndrangheta, who had been expelled from Calabria, had offered their assistance to the DC to discover the location of Moro, in exchange for the possibility to return to their homeland. This collaboration never materialized.

According to Tommaso Buscetta, a Sicilian Mafia pentito, several Italian state organizations tried to obtain information about Moro's location from the Mafia but later Giuseppe Calò asked boss Stefano Bontade to stop the search, since the highest members of the DC party no longer desired the liberation of their fellow politician. The decision to abandon the search was taken between 9 and 10 April after Moro had revealed to his captors a series of very compromising information about the CIA and Andreotti. Other sources report that the Sicilian Mafia changed its mind due to Moro's will to let the PCI enter the government.

In a deposition made at trial Raffaele Cutolo, then leader of the Camorra (Neapolitan mafia), declared that the Banda della Magliana asked him if he was interested in the liberation of Moro. Cutolo contacted the Italian secret service who replied to him to stay away from the matter, because had vetoed the intermediation for the salvation of the then president of the DC. Morucci dismissed this; he said that the Camorra's militants were apparently "normal people in suits", completely alien environment of the underworld and therefore difficult to identify from the Banda della Magliana. Morucci concluded: "We weren't a gang ... we didn't meet under the street lights ... we didn't do we trade strange ... I don't see how the Banda della Magliana or anyone could identify the Red Brigades."

On 15 October 1993, 'Ndrangheta pentito Saverio Morabito discussed the 'Ndrangheta relations with other criminal organizations. He said that Antonio Nirta, another Calabrian gangster who had been infiltrated in the Red Brigades, took part in the via Fani assault. Sergio Flamigni, a former PCI member of Parliament and member of the Italian Parliament's commission on the Moro affair who questioned the official version, wrote that when he learnt about Morabito's words, he remembered about the testimony of Cazora, who had declared that he had been approached by a Calabrian asking him about photos shot in via Fani.

According to the 'Ndrangheta pentito Francesco Fonti, his boss Sebastiano Romeo was involved in attempts to locate the place where Moro was held. Romeo had been asked by unnamed national and Calabrian members of the DC, such as Riccardo Misasi and Vito Napoli, to help out. With the help of SISMI and the Banda della Magliana, Fonti was able to locate the house where Moro was kept. When he reported back, Romeo said that he had done a good job but that important politicians in Rome had changed their minds. Morabito's revelations were not considered supported by adequate evidence.

== Role of Carmine Pecorelli ==
Carmine Pecorelli

Pecorelli, who apparently had several informers in the Italian secret services, spoke repeatedly about the kidnapping of Moro in his magazine Osservatorio politico, which he founded in 1968 to tell "the background of that system of power that was stuck in the ganglia of Italy with limited sovereignty". Before the events of via Fani, Pecorelli had already written about the possibility that Moro would be blocked in his attempt to admit the PCI into the government. On 15 March 1978, one day before Moro was abducted, Osservatorio politico published an article written by Pecorelli, who cited the anniversary of the killing of Julius Caesar in relation with the upcoming formation of Andreotti's cabinet, and mentioned a possible new Marcus Junius Brutus, who was a member of his family and one of the assassins of Julius Caesar.

The judges in Rome suspected that, before his assassination, Pecorelli was about to publish in full form many other documents from Moro, what became known as the Moro Memorial (memoriale Moro) and that he attempted to find, and which in his view would have implicated Andreotti. According to the judge Francesco Monastero, the chief investigator of Chichiarelli's crimes, said: "The motive for the Pecorelli murder must be sought in the context of the Moro crime and, more precisely, in the context of the false BR communiqués." Critics argue that Moro could be saved. Although the Perugia magistrates wrote that "there [is] no supporting evidence", they argue that this evidence emerges from the articles by Pecorelli, the documents of the Moro affair's parliamentary commission, and from the documents of the trial on the Pecorelli murder.

Articles written during the Moro's imprisonment show that he already knew of the existence of a memorial (the documents written by Moro in his detention) and of some of the unpublished letters. Pecorelli stated that there were two groups within the Red Brigades, one favourable to the negotiations, and one who wanted to kill Moro in any case. He hinted that the group that had captured Moro in via Fani was not the same that was detaining him, and which had planned the whole move. He wrote that the authors of the via Fani attack were "professionals trained in top-level war schools. The killers sent to assault the president's car, instead, could be only unskilled workers recruited on the road." When the terrorist base in via Gradoli was discovered, Pecorelli stressed how in the apartment, different from what could be expected, all the proofs of the BR's presence were clearly displayed. Regarding the kidnapping, he wrote that Moro's opening to the PCI was not welcomed by the United States, as it would change the political balance of southern Europe, and by the Soviet Union, since this would prove that communists could reach power democratically, and without being a direct offshoot of any Communist party.

In an article written the same day of his assassination, Pecorelly hinted to the role of opera composer Igor Markevitch in the kidnapping. On 20 March 1979, Pecorelli was murdered in front of his house. In 1992, Buscetta revealed that the journalist had been eliminated as "a favour to Andreotti", who was preoccupied about some information about Moro's kidnapping in the possession of Pecorelli. The latter had allegedly received from general dalla Chiesa (they were both affiliated or near to P2) a copy of a letter by Moro that contained dangerous accusations against Andreotti; the journalist had hinted about them in some previous articles. The unabridged letters were published only in 1991 when, together with others, it was discovered during renovation works in via Nevoso; only a resume of them, the Memoriale Moro, had been previously issued. The fact that Moro's letters were circulating before 1991 is proven by a speech held by Craxi, the then PSI leader, in which he mentioned a letter that had not been officially published at the time. The fact was considered a subtle menace against Andreotti in the war for the supreme political power waged between the PSI and the DC at the time.

In 1993, historian Giuseppe Tamburrano expressed doubts about what was said by the Mafia pentiti because, comparing the two memorials (the amputee of 1978 and the complete of 1990), he said that Moro's allegations addressed to Andreotti were the same, so Andreotti had no interest to order the murder of Pecorelli, who could not threaten him to publish things already known and publicly available. Andreotti underwent a trial for his role in the assassination of Pecorelli. He was acquitted in the first instance trial (1999), convicted in the second (2002), and finally acquitted by Italy's Supreme Court of Cassation (2003).

== Role of Steve Pieczenik ==
Steve Pieczenik was an American negotiator and expert in terrorism who was sent by the State Department at the request of Cossiga and remained in Italy for three weeks during Moro's detention. He later collaborated with Tom Clancy as a novel and cinematic writer. Pieczenik's presence in Italy as a member of one of the crisis committees was revealed only in the early 1990s (although writers such as Robert Katz had noted his role as Cossiga's "crisis management" expert as early as 1980). Pieczenik wrote about the possible effects of Moro's abduction, the possibility that the Red Brigades had been infiltrated by Italian agents, and also gave advice about how to find the terrorists. Eventually, Pieczenik declared that much of this was false, since the ideas included were similar to those of Ferracuti, the P2-affiliated criminologist and member of the secret committee. Pieczenik also stated that he did not release any written document. According to what was revealed by Cossiga and by Pieczenik himself, his initial idea was to show the will to negotiate, with the goal of gaining time and in the hope that the terrorists would make some error from which they could be detected. During later interviews, Pieczenik declared that there were numerous leaks about the discussions made at the committee. He said:

I found myself in a room with numerous generals and politicians, all people who knew [Moro] well, and... Well, I felt that no one of them liked Moro or appreciated him as a person, including Cossiga. It was clear that I was not speaking with his allies. ... After a while I recognized that what happened in the meeting room was leaking outside. I knew it because there were people who – including the BR themselves – were releasing declarations which could stem only from within our group. ... I thus decided to reduce the number of participants, but the leakage continued to grow, so that at the end there were only two. I and Cossiga. But the leakage did not stop.

Pieczenik declared that, once returned to the United States, he met an alleged Argentinian secret agent who knew everything that had happened at the Italian crisis committee. Pieczenik explained the leak to Argentina with the presence in the committee of numerous members of the P2 lodge, which had strong ties with the South American country; Gelli, the P2's founder, had lived for a period there. In a later interview to French journalist Emmanuel Amara, Pieczenik declared:

I soon understood the true intentions of the actors in the game: the [Italian] right wanted the death of Moro, the Red Brigades wanted him alive, while the Communist Party, due to its hardline political position, was not going to negotiate. Francesco Cossiga, from his side, wanted him alive and well, but numerous forces in the country had radically different programs ... . We had to pay attention to both the left and the right: it was necessary to avoid that the Communists entered the government and, at the same time, suppress any harmful capability of the reactionary and anti-democratic right forces. At the same time it was desirable that Moro's family did not start a parallel negotiation, averting the risk that he could be released too soon. But I recognized that, pushing my strategy to its extreme consequences, I perhaps would have to sacrify the hostage for the stability of Italy.

At his arrival in Italy, Pieczenik had been informed by Cossiga and the Vatican City intelligence services that there had been a coup attempt in Italy in previous months, led by right-wing personalities from the intelligence services and P2. Pieczenik did not specify which coup he was referring to. Known coup attempts in Italy include the Piano Solo (1964), the Golpe Borghese (1970), the Rosa dei Venti (early 1970s), and Edgardo Sogno's White Coup of 1974. In a 1981 interview given to L'Espresso, the former general Gianadelio Maletti mentioned two further coup attempts in August and September 1974; they preceded Moro's capture by several years. Pieczenik was astonished by the presence of so many fascists in the Italian intelligence services. The Red Brigades had infiltrated the Italian institutions, and obtained information from the children of politicians who were members of left-wing and far-left organizations. With the help of the Vatican intelligence, which he considered superior to the Italian one, he investigated such infiltrations but no measures were taken.

Pieczenik declared that he participated in the decision to issue the false Communication No. 7, stating that he pushed the BR to kill Moro in order to delegitimize them, once it was clear that the Italian politicians were not interested in his liberation. According to Pieczenik, the United States did not have a clear image of the situation in Italy, especially for the left-wing and right-wing terrorist groups; he also said that he received no help from the CIA or the U.S. Embassy in Rome. Pieczenik explained his premature return to the United States with the desire to avoid the accusations of American pressure behind the now likely death of Moro. Previously, he had instead declared that he had left in order to deprive the decisions taken by the Italian institutions, which he considered inefficient and corrupted, of any American legitimization.

On 18 March 1998, Corriere della Sera reported: "Giovanni Pellegrino, president of the Massacre Commission, has no doubts: 'Pieczenik's statements are very harsh and deserve careful verification.'" According to Pieczenik, a lot of confidential information that could only be known to men attending the crisis committee's core group leaked out, including the BR. Without accusing anyone, he suspected everyone. He said: "The person responsible could have been the then Interior Minister Francesco Cossiga or Giulio Andreotti or even Bettino Craxi." For Pieczenik, one exception was Berlinguer, about whom he said: "The secretary of the PCI was the only one who had sincerely tried to save Aldo Moro's life." He also accused the Italian secret services, saying: "At the time Cossiga had just replaced the heads of SISDE and SISMI. The suspicion of P2's role came later. When a self-styled adviser from the Argentine embassy in Washington approached me proposing to work for the government of Buenos Aires and spoke to me in detail about some facts of the Moro case that had only been discussed in the Roman rooms of Cossiga." During a 2006 interview, Pieczenik said:

I immediately understood what the will of the actors in the field were: the right wanted Aldo Moro dead, the Red Brigades wanted him alive, while the Communist Party, given its position of political firmness, did not wish to negotiate. Francesco Cossiga, for his part, wanted him safe and sound, but many forces within the country had clearly different programs, which created a disturbance, a very strong interference in the decisions taken at the highest levels. ... It was necessary to prevent Berlinguer's communists from entering the government and, at the same time, put an end to the ability to harm the reactionary and anti-democratic forces of the right. At the same time it was desirable that the Moro family not start a parallel negotiation, avoiding the risk of Moro being released before it was due. But I realized that, taking my strategy to its extreme consequences, i.e. keeping Moro alive as long as possible, this time perhaps I would have had to sacrifice the hostage for the stability of Italy ... I am sorry for the death of Aldo Moro; I apologize to his family and I feel sorry for him, I think we would have gotten along well, but we had to exploit the Red Brigades to get him killed.

About his time in Italy and the Moro case, Peczenik recalled: "The order was not to have the hostage released, but to help them in the negotiations relating to Aldo Moro and stabilize Italy." He added: "In a situation where the country is totally destabilized and is falling apart, when there are attacks, prosecutors, and judges killed, there can be no negotiations with terrorist organizations... If you give in, the whole system will fall apart." He also said: "The decision to have Moro killed was not taken lightly. Cossiga held steady and thus we arrived at a solution. With his death we prevented Berlinguer from reaching power and avoiding the destabilization of Italy and Europe." In 2008, Abbiamo ucciso Aldo Moro. Dopo 30 anni un protagonista esce dall'ombra (We Killed Aldo Moro: After 30 Years a Protagonist Emerges from the Shadows), which has been described as a confession book, was published in Italy by Cooper. In it, Amara quoted Peczenik as saying:

I implemented the strategic manipulation that led to the death of Aldo Moro in order to stabilize the situation in Italy. The members of the Red Brigades could have tried to influence me by saying that I satisfied their requests. But my strategy was that it didn't work that way, that I decided they had to kill him at their expense. I expected them to realize the mistake they were making and free Moro, which would have derailed my plan. Until the end I was afraid they would free Moro. And that was going to be a big win for them.

Due to this admission, which Peczenik reiterated in another 2013 interview that was acquired by the public's prosecution office, Imposimato, one of the Moro case's judges, wrote an investigative book titled I 55 giorni che hanno cambiato l'Italia. Perché Aldo Moro doveva morire? La storia vera (The 55 Days that Changed Italy: Why Aldo Moro Had to Die? The True Story), and Luigi Ciampoli of Rome's public prosecutur's office, who said in 2014, referring to Peczenik, that "Cossiga's consultant must be investigated for complicity in the murder of Aldo Moro", accused him of accessory murder. Ciampoli, who conducted the investigation after the revelations of Pieczenik and a certain Enrico Rossi, said that there are "serious indications of his participation in the murder" of Moro. This depends on understanding what is meant by accessory (concorso), a legal concept widely used by the Italian judiciary but fiercely contested by magistrates throughout Europe. There is also a difference in accessory murder together with the members of the Red Brigades, and accessory murder with Cossiga and Ugo Pecchioli because, while the result does not change, the political and criminal responsibilities do.

== Alleged presence of a marksman ==
In the course of Moro's capture, the terrorists fired 93 bullets. These killed all the five members of the escort but left Moro with only a light wound in his thigh. Despite this apparent precision, members of the BR, such as Morucci, declared that they had only a rough shooting training, obtained by firing their weapons in grottoes at night. The position of the bodyguards (two sitting in the front seats of Moro's car, and three in the following one), who were separated from him, likely made it easier for the ambush squad to direct their fire against them and avoid hitting Moro. Several writers and observers suggested that the ambushers of via Fani included a marksman.

The Italian news magazine L'Espresso argued that he could have been a member of the Italian intelligence service and identify him as Giustino De Vuono, a marksman once part of the French Foreign Legion; according to their reconstruction, the 49 bullets found in the bodies of the bodyguards would come from his weapon. A witness reporting on 19 April 1978 at Rome's Prefecture declared that he had recognized De Vuono driving a green Austin Mini or Autobianchi A112 on the location of the attack. De Vuono, who was affiliated with the 'Ndrangheta, on that day was not in his usual residence in southern Paraguay, which at the time was under the dictatorship of Alfredo Stroessner. Several members of the Red Brigades declared that their weapons were acquired from the Calabrian gangland, amongst others; furthermore, it has been proved that members of the DC got in touch with Calabrian gangsters to obtain a help in the liberation of Moro.

The identity of the alleged marksman has also been associated to the Red Army Faction. Another witness of the events in via Fani declared that some thirty minutes before the ambush, a foreigner with German accent had addressed him, ordering to go away from the area. Since some of the ammunition used for the assault had been treated with a special preserving paint, which was also found in some secret depots related to the Gladio undercover organization, it has been suggested that these would come from some Italian military or paramilitary corps.

== Theory of the alternative kidnapping ==
Journalist Rita Di Giovacchino suggested that Moro was not in via Fani during the assault but had been taken prisoner by another organization, and that the Red Brigades acted only as front men. This would explain their reticence and the incongruity of their declarations about the whole kidnapping, from the ambush to the presence of sand on Moro's body. According to her, this would also explain the prophetic remark pronounced by Sereno Freato, the first secretary of Moro, when Pecorelli was also found dead. Freato had said: "Investigate the instigators of Pecorelli's murder, and you will find the instigators of Moro's murder." She thus listed as part of the same plot the deaths of Pecorelli, Chichiarelli (who would have been punished for his blackmailing attempts), and Varisco. Allegedly killed by the Red Brigades in 1979, although in circumstances never clear, Varisco had been at the helm of the investigation on the BR base in via Gradoli; he was also a friend of dalla Chiesa, who was also murdered for never completely understood reasons, as well as of Pecorelli. According to Di Giovacchino, the use made by the BR of printing machines once owned by the Italian intelligence, showed that the latter were likely the organization behind all these bloody acts.

Moretti declared that he was studying Moro's daily moves since 1976. Every morning, Moro went with his grandson to a church near his house, after which he had a short walk with only one member of the escort. This looked like a more favourable moment to kidnap him, since most of the bodyguards were not present, but he was not chosen by the terrorists. On the morning of his abduction, Moro did not bring his grandson with him. After the ambush in via Fani, the terrorists took only the most interesting for them of the five bags that Moro carried with him. Those containing his medicines and his reserved documents. Furthermore, the necessity of inflicting a coup de grâce to any of the bodyguards is in contrast with a hurried attack typical of such acts, and is motivated only by the necessity to eliminate any possible witness that would reveal that Moro was not there. In a letter to his wife, Moro wrote during captivity he asked her to take care of his bags. Since Moro was aware that if his bags had been found in the assault's location, they had been taken by the investigators. Additionally, the absence from his letter of any word about the victims of via Fani has been taken as an element in favour of the theory that Moro was captured while in his Gladio escort and not in via Fani, and so did not know anything about their assassination.

== Doubts about the via Fani assault ==
Numerous unanswered questions surround Moro's kidnapping in via Fani. Eleonora Chiavarelli, Moro's widow, mentioned that in Moro's letters, which were delivered by the terrorists, there was no mention of the killing of his bodyguards. Given the character of Moro, she and others considered it improbable that he did not write a single word about these victims. On 1 October 1993, during the fourth trial on the Moro affair, ballistic experts released a report that disputed the version of Morucci. According to their new report, a second member of the ambush squad fired towards the Fiat 132. According to the ballistic report by Antonio Ugolini cited in the Acts of Moro's fourth trial (Processo Moro Quater), "in via Fani, on the morning of 16 March [1978], at least seven weapons fired. The shots came from both the sides of the street and not only from the left, as stated by the terrorist Valerio Morucci in a memorial." The number of the participants in the ambush (the terrorists initially spoke of nine, later of eleven people) is considered small by other terrorists, such as Franceschini. He declared: "For the capture of Mario Sossi, in 1974, we were twelve. I think that managing a kidnapping such as that of via Fani with 11 is quite risky." Alessandro Marini, an engineer who passed by via Fani the day of the assault, declared that two people on a Honda motorbike shot at him with a firearm. The motorbike preceded Moretti's car. Members of the Red Brigades always denied the presence of the Honda and did not explain the origin of the shooting against Marini.

The confession of a mysterious terminally ill former BR member in Five Moons Square would have anticipated some events that occurred a few years after the release of the 2003 film, namely the 2009 discovery of a letter, which was brought to light by a former police inspector. The letter, which was published by La Stampa in October 2009, references the mysterious men on board a Honda motorbike, who were linked to the secret services, and that allegedly shot against a witness to keep him away and protected the Red Brigades during and after the via Fani ambush. The sender claimed to have been a former secret agent involved in the Moro case in the service of Guglielmi. The presence of Guglielmi himself, which was declared as random, was in fact ascertained in the vicinity of the ambush in via Fani as early as 1991. Martinelli, the director of Five Moons Square, stated that the man could hardly have been influenced by his film and that, in his opinion, it was a truly possible lead.

An unexplained element is how the terrorists could have planned an ambush in via Fani, since Moro's escort changed their routes daily. The terrorists for the occasion had taken measures, such as cutting the tyres of the van of a florist who worked in via Fani, in order to remove a dangerous witness during the ambush, which can be explained only by their having precise knowledge of Moro's route that morning. SIP, Italy's national telephone company that would become Telecom Italia, was exceedingly inefficient on numerous occasions linked to Moro's detention. In particular, after the assault in via Fani, all the phone communications in the area were inoperative. Other examples included when, on 14 April 1978, journalists of Rome's newspaper Il Messaggero were waiting for a phone call from the terrorists. The six phone lines in the newspaper's office had been connected to police central; when the call arrived, DIGOS reported that all of them had been cut, with the result that the caller could not be identified. On 15 March 1978, the day before the capture of Moro, SIP had been alerted. After Moro had been kidnapped, an inspection of the telephone lines in the area of via Fani showed that they were all out of order. This prevented any possible witness contact with the police before the ambush. The commander of DIGOS during the kidnapping days described SIP as "totally un-cooperative", and stated that "in no occasion did they find the origin of the kidnappers' calls". He added that Michele Principe, then general director of STET – Società Finanziaria Telefonica, the company that owned SIP, was a member of the P2.

== Other suspicions and controversies ==
Despite several trials, numerous parliamentary commissions of inquiry, collateral judicial inquiries, and hundreds of books, controversies about the Moro affair remain into the 21st century. Chichiarelli, the author of the false Communication No. 7, was related to the Banda della Magliana. Aside from its purely criminal activities, this large gang in Rome was related to Sicilian Mafia and has been involved in numerous political and terrorist scandals since the 1970s. Judiciary acts proved that members of the gang had a role in the assassination of Pecorelli and in the case of Roberto Calvi, both of which saw the incrimination of Andreotti, in the financial affairs of the Vatican City including the kidnapping of Emanuela Orlandi, and in the sidetracking of the investigations on massacres, such as the Bologna massacre in 1980. Imposimato showed that the Banda della Magliana had strong ties with SISMI, and that the latter inspired the farce of the communication and of the Lago della Duchessa. The via Montalcini apartment, in which Moro was allegedly detained by the Red Brigades, was located in the Magliana quarter of southern Rome and a member of the gang owned the building facing that apartment. A document from the Antimafia Commission said that the via Fani assault was not a solitary action by the Red Brigades, and that organized crime in Italy, such as the Banda della Magliana and 'Ndrangheta, helped them; it also investigated the allegations that it was Giustino De Vuono, who left Italy to become a member of the French Foreign Legion, the one to kill Moro. In an initial reconstruction, there were only four killers. Later in the 2000s, after six trials, it was thought that at least twenty people were involved in the entire operation.

Members of Moro's escort, who were not in service on the day of the kidnapping, declared in September 1978 that Moro was a habitual person, and that every day he got out from his house exactly at 09:00; according to journalist Simona Zecchi, author of La criminalità servente nel caso Moro (Crime Serving in the Moro Case), the foreman leader Rocco Gentiluomo was warned not to take service on 16 March by a 'Ndrangheta boss. Moro's widow denied this circumstance during her interview in front of the investigative judges on 23 September 1978. Additionally, that Moro was suffering from Stockholm syndrome was questioned by the two reports of the Italian Parliament's inquiry about the Moro affair. According to this view, Moro was at the height of his faculties, he was very recognizable, and at some point it was him who was leading the negotiation for his own liberation and salvation. This position was supported by Leonardo Sciascia, who discussed it in the minority report he signed as a member of the first parliamentary commission and in his book L'affaire Moro. The BR members stated that they chose Moro over Andreotti due to the latter's being too protected. This was denied by Andreotti, who during those years always went every morning to mass alone and on foot. Cossiga declared that Moro's confessor, Don Antonio Mennini (later papal nuncio to Great Britain), was allowed to enter in the cell just before his execution. In 2015, Don Mennini denied this reconstruction. Another controversy is related to the Vatican's attempt to save Moro. According to Mennini, Pope Paul VI had saved £10 billion to pay a ransom in order to save Moro. This is corroborated by the general Antonio Cornacchia, who discussed the pope's attempt to save Moro by paying a ransom; this was blocked after a call by what Cornacchia described as a member of the Christ in Paradise lodge, prompting him to recall years later that "presumably the U-turn came from the Vatican itself, which prohibited the Pope from saving Moro".

Twenty years after Moro's death, The Independent and The New York Times reported on the popularity of such conspiracy theories, and that few Italians believe in the official version of the Moro affair, namely that only the BR bore responsibility for Moro's murder and that the Italian government did its best to save Moro. Alessandra Stanley wrote: "The only prominent dissenters are Mr. Andreotti and his closest aides, some former Red Brigades terrorists who still resist the notion that they were unwittingly manipulated by sinister right-wing forces, and an American scholar, Richard Drake, who wrote a 1995 book that concluded that there was no conspiracy. Mr. Drake's book was widely disparaged in Italy." Marco Baliani, who had a one-man show about the Moro case, said: "It has been 20 years, and still the deeper truth has not come out. How can we found a new republic if we cannot tell the truth to ourselves?" Many books have been written that question the Moro trials since the 1980s. They continued to be published well into the 2020s, one example being Aldo Moro. Una verità compromessa (Aldo Moro: A Compromised Truth). In the words of the journalist Luca Villoresi, the Moro affair "has produced nothing but lies and false leads. I don't think it is possible any more to find out what really happened. Certainly, there are people who know the truth, but we will never know if they are telling us the truth."

In 2013, Imposimato, one of the judges of the Moro case, said that Moro was murdered by the Red Brigades with the complicity of Andreotti, Cossiga, and Nicola Lettieri. He added that if some documents had not been hidden from him, he would have indicted them for complicity in association in the Moro case, including for the Piazza Fontana bombing (by far-right Ordine Nuovo) and the via D'Amelio bombing (by the Sicilian Mafia). Rome's public prosecutor office had opened an investigation file relating to the statements of two bomb squad members, Vitantonio Raso and Giovanni Circhetta, who were never questioned and said that they arrived to the location two hours before the call from the Red Brigades. Imposimato, by now honorary president of Italy's Supreme Court of Cassation, singled out Andreotti (who died in May 2013) and Cossiga (who died in 2010) when he told Affaritaliani: "The role [of the Italian political class] was one of absolute subordination to this foreign hegemony. In Italy the orders that came in from abroad were obeyed." Writing in La Repubblica, Miguel Gotor condemned the "intellectual and civil sloth" that had led to the lingering mystery over the murder. He said that while a new judicial investigation was welcome, it risked being "the belated and rotten fruit of a sick country". He added: "Certainly, this new move by the magistrature could prove useful because it will gather together new documents and testimony, but we will be forgiven for doubting that it will be able to give qualitatively more justice than has hitherto been the case."

In 2014, the first edition of Aldo Moro: Il Partito Democratico vuole la verità (Aldo Moro: The Democratic Party Wants the Truth), was published. Gero Grassi, a former DC member and by then a member of the Democratic Party, which was founded in 2007 as a merger of the PCI's legal successor parties and the DC's left wings, was a member of the Commission of Inquiry into the Moro Case and author of the parliamentary volume. He said that the reports of the Moro Commission, which was approved by the Chamber of Deputies and the Senate of the Republic, overturned the judicial and historical truth. According to this reconstruction, the via Fani attack saw at least 20 people engaged in the scene of the crime rather than the maximum of 9 people claimed by the Red Brigades, among the other cited inconsistencies. In November 2014, Rome's public prosecutor wrote that it was certain that in via Fani, apart from the Red Brigades, there were also elements of the Italian state's deviated secret services, men of Rome's mafia like the Banda della Magliana, and men of the European secret services.

In August 2020, about sixty individuals from the world of historical research and political inquiry signed a document denouncing the growing weight that the conspiratorial view on the kidnapping and killing of the Moro has in public discourse. Historian Marco Clementi, who was one of the signatories, stated that this stance forces everyone "to measure themselves against the principle of reality". Paolo Persichetti, a writer and former Red Brigades member who signed the document, commented:

The trigger [for signing the document] was yet another fake that brought together the events related to the Bologna massacre of August 1980, which according to the sentences of the judiciary have a right-wing matrix, in any case opposite in motive, objectives, and operational practices to the making of groups of the armed revolutionary left and of the Red Brigades, genetically anti-stragista [e.g. they did not engage in massacres like that of 1980].

In January 2022, a note claiming responsibility for the abduction of Moro was auctioned despite widespread condemnation.

== See also ==
- John F. Kennedy assassination conspiracy theories

== Bibliography ==
- Drake, Richard (1995). The Aldo Moro Murder Case. Cambridge, Massachusetts: Harvard University Press. ISBN 978-0-6740-1481-7 – via Google Books.
- Drake, Richard (November 1998). "Mythmaking & the Aldo Moro case". The New Criterion. Vol. 17, no. 3. p. 76.
- Drake, Richard (2001). "Why the Moro Trials Have Not Settled the Moro Murder Case: A Problem in Political and Intellectual History". The Journal of Modern History. 73 (2): 359–378. doi:10.1086/321029. ISSN 0022-2801. JSTOR 10.1086/321029. S2CID 144245156.
