= Exterior Night =

2022 Italian-language drama film

- Italian: Esterno notte
- Directed by: Marco Bellocchio
- Screenplay by: Marco Bellocchio; Stefano Bises; Ludovica Rampoldi; Davide Serino
- Story by: Marco Bellocchio; Stefano Bises; Giovanni Bianconi
- Produced by: Lorenzo Mieli; Simone Gattoni
- Starring: Fabrizio Gifuni; Margherita Buy; Toni Servillo; Fausto Russo Alesi; Daniela Marra; Gabriel Montesi
- Cinematography: Francesco Di Giacomo
- Edited by: Francesca Calvelli
- Music by: Fabio Massimo Capogrosso
- Production companies: The Apartment Pictures; Kavac Film; Rai Fiction; Arte
- Distributed by: Lucky Red
- Release dates: 20 May 2022 (Cannes); 18 May 2022 (Italy Part I); 9 June 2022 (Italy Part II)
- Running time: 344 minutes
- Countries: Italy; France
- Language: Italian

Exterior Night (Italian: Esterno notte) is a 2022 Italian-language drama film co-written and directed by Marco Bellocchio based on the kidnapping and murder of Aldo Moro. The film is the second feature by Bellocchio based on the Moro case after Good Morning, Night, shot in 2003.

Originally conceived as a RAI television miniseries, it premiered out of competition at the 2022 Cannes Film Festival. It was then given a theatrical release in Italy as two films (titled Act I and Act II), before being aired on Rai 1 and on Netflix.

== Plot ==
=== Part 1 – Aldo Moro ===
In 1978, Aldo Moro, the president of Christian Democracy (DC), attempted to form a government of national unity with the external support of the Italian Communist Party in what was a first time for a country belonging to the North Atlantic Treaty. During the party assembly, Moro tries to convince the most recalcitrant exponents within the party about the goodness of this operation. Francesco Cossiga, who would be confirmed as Minister of the Interior in the new government led by Giulio Andreotti, privately tells Moro that the Americans will not agree but Moro asks him to reassure them. Moro and Andreotti are working to form the new cabinet and they dissatisfy several members of their party with the role assigned to them. Late in the evening, before returning home, Moro meets Enrico Berlinguer to whom he hands over the list of ministers and undersecretaries.

On 16 March, Moro leaves his home accompanied by his escort. While the swearing-in ceremony of the Andreotti IV Cabinet is in progress, the cars of Moro and the escort are attacked in via Mario Fani by an armed nucleus of the Red Brigades (BR); the agents are killed and Moro is kidnapped. Andreotti, having received the news, goes to the bathroom to vomit. The police forces start looking for Moro who in the meantime, after being drugged, wakes up inside a wooden box transported in a van.

=== Part 2 – The Minister of the Interior ===
Cossiga is in despair over the incident and asks the task force of his department to do everything possible to obtain Moro's release. A photo taken by the BR in the hideout proves that Moro is alive. On 29 March, Moro's private secretary brings Cossiga a letter written by him. Cossiga read the letter to Andreotti and affirmed that it would be better to open a channel with the BR, which made the letter public: the confidential negotiation could not even start. The expert reports carried out suggest that Moro may have been drugged: his condition would therefore be such that the moral value of his letters has lost credibility.

=== Part 3 – The Pope ===
Pope Paul VI asks the crowd of faithful to pray for Moro and makes an appeal that he be returned to his loved ones. Monsignor Agostino Casaroli reports to Andreotti that the Pope has raised 20 billion lire to pay the ransom and that, with the consent of the Italian government, he would like to use a Vatican route to save Moro. The leaders of the armed forces tell Andreotti that if a ransom is paid there will be chaos. Andreotti accepts the yes to the redemption option from the secretaries of the main parties. Cesare Curioni, chaplain of the San Vittore Prison, has the difficult task of mediating with the kidnappers, an attempt that fails because they refuse to provide proof that Moro is alive. The Pope then manifests his intention to contact the kidnappers personally.

=== Part 4 – The Terrorists ===
Adriana Faranda begins her life within the Red Brigades. On 8 March, the BR are training in view of the attack on Moro's escort and Mario Moretti excludes Faranda because she has recently joined the group. On 18 April, divers scour the Duchessa Lake near Rieti in search of Moro's body; Faranda and Valerio Morucci are opposed to the killing of Moro, while Moretti and Barbara Balzerani are determined and do not want to have second thoughts.

=== Part 5 – Eleonora ===
Eleonora Moro arrives at the site of the ambush in via Fani and is immediately concerned that her husband has his medicines with him. Back home, she reunites with her family and welcomes, almost reluctantly, various figures from the political scene, including Benigno Zaccagnini and Italy's president Giovanni Leone. Eleonora is furious because her husband is considered crazy in the newspapers and attacks Zaccagnini for not wanting to start a deal with the BR.

On 22 April, the Pope makes a public appeal asking that Moro be released simply, without conditions. Eleonora tells her children that even the Pope has surrendered. On 30 April, a member of the BR calls Eleonora arguing that she needs a direct and clarifying intervention from Zaccagnini to change the situation, otherwise it will be inevitable for the BR to kill Moro. Eleonora immediately calls Leone asking him to put pressure on Zaccagnini but even the president of the Italian Republic does not seem to want to help her.

=== Part 6 – The End ===
On 8 May, Antonio Mennini is secretly brought to the hideout so that Moro can confess for the last time: the statesman unburdens himself with him, accusing the entire DC and above all Andreotti of having sentenced him to death. The next day, Morucci calls from a telephone booth telling him that he should let the Moro family know that the body is in the trunk of a car in via Caetani. Cossiga rushes to the place being challenged harshly by those present and being shocked. Meanwhile, the hideout where Moro had been kept is cleaned up in a hurry by the BR.

== Cast ==
- Fabrizio Gifuni as Aldo Moro
- Margherita Buy as Eleonora Chiavarelli, Moro's wife
- Toni Servillo as Pope Paul VI
- Fausto Russo Alesi as Francesco Cossiga
- Daniela Marra as Adriana Faranda
- Gabriel Montesi as Valerio Morucci
- Fabrizio Contri as Giulio Andreotti
- Gigio Alberti as Benigno Zaccagnini

== Production ==
On 18 January 2020, Bellocchio announced that he would be shooting a series centered on the kidnapping of Aldo Moro; later the episodes were combined into a film divided into two parts.

== Accolades ==
Award	Date of ceremony	Category	Recipient(s)	Result
David di Donatello Awards	10 May 2023	Best Film	Exterior Night	Nominated
David di Donatello Awards	10 May 2023	Best Director	Marco Bellocchio	Won
David di Donatello Awards	10 May 2023	Best Actor	Fabrizio Gifuni	Won
David di Donatello Awards	10 May 2023	Best Actress	Margherita Buy	Nominated
David di Donatello Awards	10 May 2023	Best Supporting Actor	Fausto Russo Alesi	Nominated
David di Donatello Awards	10 May 2023	Best Supporting Actor	Toni Servillo	Nominated
David di Donatello Awards	10 May 2023	Best Supporting Actress	Daniela Marra	Nominated
David di Donatello Awards	10 May 2023	Best Original Screenplay	Marco Bellocchio, Stefano Bises, Ludovica Rampoldi e Davide Serino	Nominated
David di Donatello Awards	10 May 2023	Best Producer	The Apartment, Kavac Film	Nominated
David di Donatello Awards	10 May 2023	Best Cinematography	Francesco Di Giacomo	Nominated
David di Donatello Awards	10 May 2023	Best Production Design	Andrea Castorina, Marco Martucci and Laura Casalini	Nominated
David di Donatello Awards	10 May 2023	Best Costumes	Daria Calvelli	Nominated
David di Donatello Awards	10 May 2023	Best Make-up	Enrico Iacoponi	Won
David di Donatello Awards	10 May 2023	Best Hairstyling	Alberta Giuliani	Nominated
David di Donatello Awards	10 May 2023	Best Visual Effects	Massimo Cipollina	Nominated
David di Donatello Awards	10 May 2023	Best Editing	Francesca Calvelli and Claudio Misantoni	Won
David di Donatello Awards	10 May 2023	Best Sound	Gaetano Carito, Lilio Rosato and Nadia Paone	Nominated
David di Donatello Awards	10 May 2023	Best Score	Fabio Massimo Capogrosso	Nominated

== Related articles ==
- Good Morning, Night
- Years of Lead (Italy)
