= The Moro Affair =

1986 film

- Italian theatrical release poster
- Directed by: Giuseppe Ferrara
- Written by: Robert Katz; Armenia Balducci; Giuseppe Ferrara
- Produced by: Mauro Berardi
- Starring: Gian Maria Volonté
- Cinematography: Camillo Bazzoni
- Edited by: Roberto Perpignani
- Music by: Pino Donaggio
- Production company: Yarno Cinematografica
- Distributed by: Columbia Pictures Italia
- Release date: 13 November 1986 (Italy)
- Running time: 110 minutes
- Country: Italy
- Language: Italian

The Moro Affair (Italian: Il caso Moro) is a 1986 Italian crime film directed by Giuseppe Ferrara about the kidnapping of Aldo Moro in 1978.

== Plot ==
The film chronicles the 55 days of the kidnapping of Aldo Moro, from the Via Fani massacre to the discovery of the body of the Christian Democracy president in Via Caetani. It depicts the events that characterized those days, omitting conspiracy theories that emerged only in subsequent years, such as the presence of an official from SISMI near Via Fani on the morning of the attack and contacts between the state and criminal organizations (Camorra, Banda della Magliana, still active in 1986) to locate Moro's prison. The movie also includes artistic choices that contradict established historical facts, such as the absence of ski masks worn by the terrorists and the portrayal of Don Stefani entering the Red Brigades' hideout, events that never occurred.

== Cast ==
- Gian Maria Volonté as Aldo Moro
- Mattia Sbragia as 1st Brigadist
- Bruno Zanin as 2nd Brigadist
- Consuelo Ferrara as 3rd Brigadist
- Enrica Maria Modugno as 4th Brigadist
- Enrica Rosso as 5th Brigadist
- Maurizio Donadoni as 6th Brigadist
- Stefano Abbati as 7th Brigadist
- Danilo Mattei as 8th Brigadist
- Massimo Tedde as 9th Brigadist
- Francesco Capitano as 10th Brigadist
- Margarita Lozano as Nora Moro
- Sergio Rubini as Giovanni Moro
- Daniela De Silva as Maria Fida Moro
- Emanuela Taschini as Anna Moro

== Release ==
The film was released in Milan, Italy on 13 November, 1986. This was followed by screenings in Rome, Bologna, Naples, and Florence on November 20, 1986.

== See also ==
- Five Moons Square
