= Alessio Casimirri =

Italian terrorist 1951-

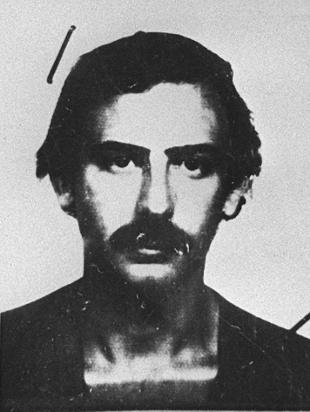
- Born: Alessio Casimirri; 2 August 1951 (age 74); Rome, Italy
- Occupation: terrorist (fugitive)
- Organization: Red Brigades
- Height: 1.70 m (5 ft 7 in)

Alessio Casimirri (born 2 August 1951) is an Italian terrorist, former member of the Red Brigades (BR), currently fugitive.

Casimirri was born in Rome. His mother was a Vatican City citizen, and his father had worked for the Vatican newspaper L'Osservatore Romano and as the public relations man for three Popes.

After a militancy in Potere Operaio and other left organizations in Rome, he entered the Red Brigades. He was condemned in absentia to life imprisonment for the assassination of Aldo Moro's escort in 1978. In 1980 he abandoned the BR and subsequently fled abroad, reaching Nicaragua after a period in Libya and Cuba. In the Central American country he participated in the Sandinist guerrilla against the Contras. Together with other Italian expatriates, he opened a restaurant in Managua called Magica Roma, and more recently another seafood restaurant called La cueva del Buzo ("Diver's lair") in Managua.
