= State secret =

State secret may refer to:

- Classified information, about state secrets in government
- State Secret (1950 film), a British film
- State Secret (1995 film), an Italian film

== See also ==
- State secrets privilege, about the origin of the doctrine of state secrets in the United States
