= Sergio Flamigni =

Italian politician and writer (1925–2025)

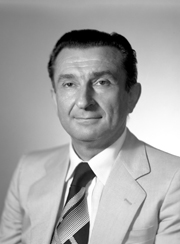

Member of the Senate of the Republic
- In office 20 June 1979 – 1 July 1987
- Constituency: Emilia Romagna

Member of the Chamber of Deputies
- In office 5 June 1968 – 19 June 1979
- Constituency: Bologna

Personal details
- Born: 22 October 1925 Forlì, Italy
- Died: 10 December 2025 (aged 100) Bracciano, Italy
- Party: Italian Communist Party
- Profession: Writer

Sergio Flamigni (22 October 1925 – 10 December 2025) was an Italian politician and writer. A member of the Italian Communist Party (PCI), he took part in the Italian Parliament's investigative commissions on the murder of Aldo Moro, the Propaganda Due scandal, and the Italian Mafia.

== Life and career ==
Flamigni was born in Forlì on 22 October 1925. He began his political activity in 1941, as a member of a clandestine group of young anti-fascists in his hometown, and subsequently entered the Communist Party of Italy. In 1943, he was named secretary of the communist youth movement in Forlì and became a member of the party's clandestine committee in the city. He fought as partisan in the Italian resistance movement against the German occupation.

In 1952, Flamigni was appointed secretary of CGIL (Italy's left-wing main trade union) in Forlì, and later he became secretary of the local section of PCI. In 1959, he was elected into the party's national central committee, and in the following year regional coordinator for Emilia-Romagna. He was also a member of the city council of Forlì from 1956 to 1960, and of the provincial council from 1960 until 1964.

Flamigni was elected to the Italian Chamber of Deputies in 1968, remaining a member until 1979, when he became an Italian Senator. Flamigni worked in the Italian Parliament's commissions on the Mafia, the kidnapping of Aldo Moro, and the Propaganda Due secret lodge. He authored books on these topics.

== Death ==
Flamigni died on 10 December 2025, at the age of 100.

== Works ==
- La resistenza in Romagna (with Luciano Marzocchi, 1969)
- Sicurezza democratica e lotta alla criminalità (with Malagugini, Perna, Spagnoli, Terracini; 1975)
- Gastone Sozzi e il Partito Comunista in Romagna (1980)
- La tela del ragno. Il delitto Moro (1988; 5th edition 2003)
- Trame atlantiche. Storia della Loggia massonica segreta P2 (1996; second edition 2005)
- «Il mio sangue ricadrà su di loro». Gli scritti di Aldo Moro prigioniero delle Br (1997)
- Convergenze parallele. Le Brigate rosse, i servizi segreti e il delitto Moro (1998)
- Il covo di Stato. Via Gradoli 96 e il delitto Moro (1999)
- I fantasmi del passato. La carriera politica di Francesco Cossiga (2001)
- La sfinge delle Brigate Rosse. Delitti, segreti e bugie del capo terrorista Mario Moretti (2004)
- Dossier Pecorelli (2004)
- Le idi di marzo. Il delitto Moro secondo Mino Pecorelli (2006)
- Il sequestro di verità. I buchi neri del delitto Moro (with Roberto Bartali, Giuseppe De Lutiis, Ilaria Moroni, Lorenzo Ruggiero; 2008)
