= Eleonora Chiavarelli =

Italian women and wife of Aldo Moro (1915–2010)

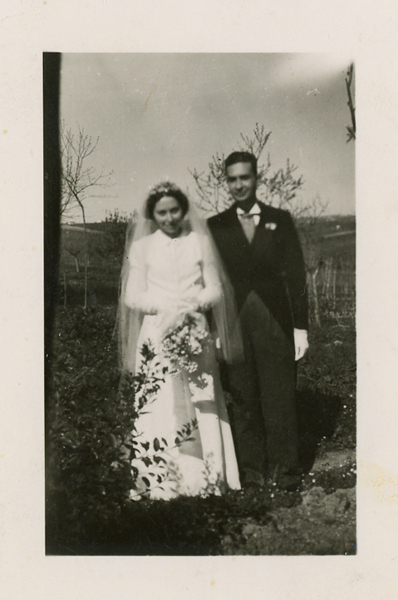
- Born: 1915; Montemarciano, Kingdom of Italy
- Died: 18 July 2010 (aged 94–95); Rome, Italy
- Burial place: Torrita Tiberina
- Spouse: Aldo Moro (m. 1945; murdered 1978)
- Children: Maria Fida (1946-2024), Anna (1949), Agnese (1952), Giovanni (1958)

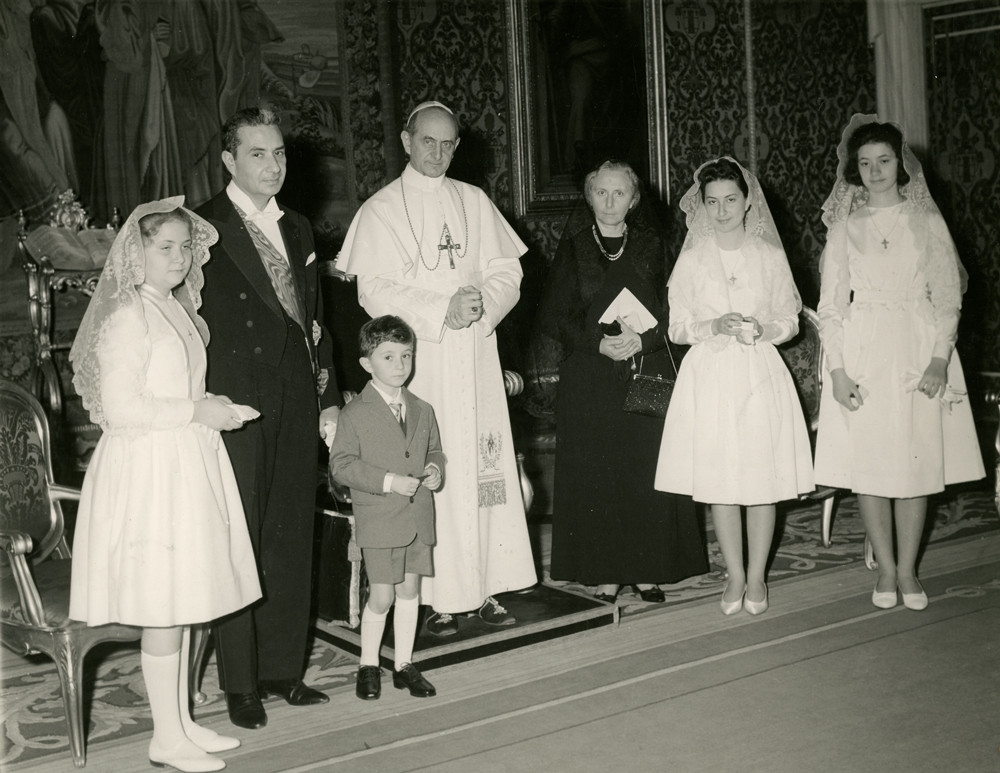
Chiavarelli, Aldo Moro and their children with Pope Paul VI

Eleonora Chiavarelli (1915 – 18 July 2010) was an Italian woman who was the spouse of Aldo Moro, a politician who was kidnapped and murdered in 1978.

== Biography ==
Chiavarelli was born in 1915 in Montemarciano. Her father was a physician. During World War II Chiavarelli worked in the Italian Red Cross.

Chiavarelli was part of an active youth organization, Italian Catholic Federation of University Students, during her university studies. She married Aldo Moro in Montemarciano on 5 April 1945. They had four children, three daughters and a son: Maria Fida, Agnese, Anna and Giovanni. The family spent summer holidays at their home in Terracina from 1960.

Her husband, Aldo Moro, was kidnapped by a terrorist group, Red Brigades, in Rome on the morning of 16 March 1978, and his corpse was found there on 9 May 1978. Following the death of Aldo Moro she did not accept the proposal of organizing a state funeral for him. The family organized a private funeral ceremony which was attended only by a small number of family members and friends on 10 May. It was Moro's request which he had written in one of his letters during his captivity. He was buried in Torrita Tiberina, near Rome. Chiavarelli did not attend the state funeral for Aldo Moro held in the Church of San Giovanni in Laterano on 13 May.

In her later years Chiavarelli lived in Montemarciano and in Sanctuary of NS dei Lumi di Alberici. She died in Rome on 18 July 2010 at the age of 95. She was buried in Torrita Tiberina beside her husband's grave on 19 July. Her eldest child, Maria Fida, did not attend the funeral ceremony.

=== In popular culture ===
In an Italian crime movie, The Moro Affair, directed by Giuseppe Ferrara in 1986, Eleonora Chiavarelli was featured by Spanish actress Margarita Lozano.

In Marco Bellocchio's 2022 film Exterior Night, Chiavarelli was portrayed by Margherita Buy.
