= Maria Fida Moro =

Italian politician (1946–2024)

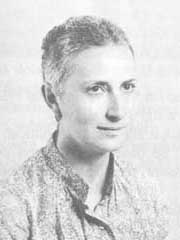
- Maria Fida Moro in 1987

Member of the Senate of the Republic
- In office 2 July 1987 – 22 April 1992
- Constituency: Bitonto

Personal details
- Born: Maria Fida Moro; 17 December 1946 Rome, Italy
- Died: 7 February 2024 (aged 77) Rome, Italy
- Party: PR (2008–2024)
- Other political affiliations: DC (1987–1990); PRC (1990–1991); Independent (1991–1993); MSI (1993–1995); AN (1995–1998); RI (1999–2002); Independent (2002–2008)
- Parent(s): Aldo Moro (father); Eleonora Chiavarelli (mother)
- Occupation: Politician

Maria Fida Moro (17 December 1946 – 7 February 2024) was an Italian politician who served as senator of the Republic in the X Legislature. She was the oldest daughter of Italian Prime Minister Aldo Moro who served in that role from 1974 to 1976. She died in Rome on 7 February 2024, at the age of 77.
