= State Secret (1995 film) =

1995 film

- Film poster
- Directed by: Giuseppe Ferrara
- Written by: Andrea Frezza; Andrea Purgatori
- Starring: Massimo Ghini; Massimo Dapporto; Antonello Fassari; Isabel Russinova; Mariella Valentini; Tony Sperandeo; Adriana Russo; Alfredo Pea; Giampiero Bianchi; Adalberto Maria Merli
- Cinematography: Claudio Cirillo
- Music by: Pino Donaggio
- Release date: 24 March 1995
- Running time: 104 minutes
- Country: Italy
- Language: Italian

State Secret (Italian: Segreto di stato) is a 1995 Italian thriller film directed by Giuseppe Ferrara. It was entered into the 19th Moscow International Film Festival.

== Cast ==
- Massimo Ghini as Carlo Tommasi
- Massimo Dapporto as Beppe Fossati
- Antonello Fassari as Carmine Muschio
- Isabel Russinova as Judge Francesca Savona
- Mariella Valentini as Laura Melli
- Tony Sperandeo as Gangster
- Tino Bianchi as Banker
- Aldo Massasso
- Adriana Russo as Lilli
- Alfredo Pea as Torre
- Giampiero Bianchi as Minister
- Adalberto Maria Merli as Ermes Ravida
