= Adriana Faranda =

Italian former terrorist

Adriana Faranda (born 7 August 1950) is an Italian former terrorist, who was a member of the Red Brigades during the kidnapping of Aldo Moro.

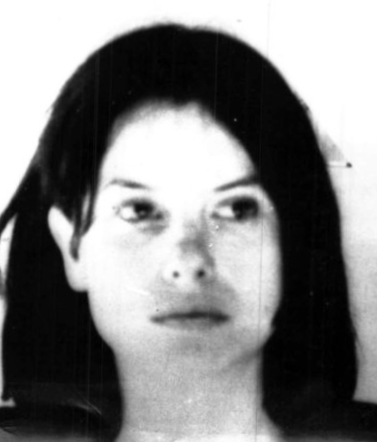
Mugshot of Adriana Faranda

== Biography ==
Faranda was born in Tortorici, province of Messina, in eastern Sicily from a wealthy bourgeois family (her father held the role of general lawyer of the State in Messina), once she had finished the regular cycle of studies in Sicily, she enrolled in the Faculty of Letters at La Sapienza in Rome.

Initially a member of Potere Operaio, in 1973, together with other future members of the Red Brigades (or BR) such as Bruno Seghetti and Valerio Morucci, she founded the extremist group LAPP (Lotta Armata Potere Proletario, meaning "Armed Struggle - Proletarian Power"). Later she was part of the Roman "column" of the BR, and became a member of national council of the Red Brigades.

In 1978 she took part in the kidnapping of former prime minister Aldo Moro. According to her testimony during the ensuing trial, she was, along with Morucci, against the execution of the politician; when the latter was killed, Faranda abandoned the BR, after which she entered other formations connected to far-left leader Franco Piperno.

Faranda had been identified as the woman who had bought the fake Alitalia uniforms used by the ambushers of Moro's escort, and was arrested in Rome in May 1979, together with Morucci, in the house of former Potere Operaio militant Giuliana Conforto (daughter of alleged KGB spy or anti-communist double agent Giorgio Conforto). Due to her "dissociation" from the BR (she admitted her crimes but did not denounce other members), she was released in 1994, before her sentence had expired.

Faranda wrote an autobiography in which she described the years she spent in jail.

Italian actress Francesca Prandi portrayed Faranda in the 1991 John Frankenheimer film, Year of the Gun.
Italian actress Daniela Marra portrayed Faranda in the 2022 Marco Bellocchio TV series, Exterior Night.
