= Barbara Balzerani =

Italian terrorist (1949–2024)

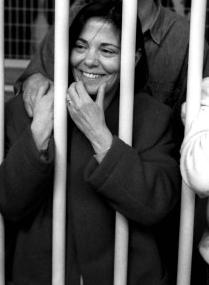
Barbara Balzerani

Barbara Balzerani (16 January 1949 – 4 March 2024) was an Italian terrorist as member of Red Brigades.

== Background ==
Barbara Balzerani was born at Colleferro, in the province of Rome on 16 January 1949. She died on 4 March 2024, at the age of 75.

== Career ==
In the 1970s Balzerani became a leader of the Red Brigades (Italian Brigate Rosse, or BR, which she had joined in 1975) in Rome. She took part in several killings, such as that of Girolamo Minervini and the assassination of Aldo Moro's escort in Via Fani (1978). After the arrest of BR's national leader Mario Moretti in 1981, she unsuccessfully tried to handle the split in the organization, becoming a leader of the "Brigate Rosse - Partito Comunista Combattente", while Giovanni Senzani led the other faction, the "BR - Partito Guerriglia".

During the detention of Aldo Moro, she occupied, together with Moretti, the BR base in Via Gradoli in Rome. The base was discovered due to a water leak, allegedly caused by a tap left open - although the circumstances of its discovery by Italian police forces were never totally made clear. In 1981 she participated in the abduction of U.S. Army general James L. Dozier.

Balzerani was one of the last historical BR leaders to be arrested, in 1985. From prison, she claimed responsibility for the assassination of Florence's former mayor Lando Conti. She was sentenced to life imprisonment, but was paroled on 12 December 2006. She received complete freedom in 2011.

Balzerani wrote four books, Compagna luna (1998), La sirena delle cinque (2003), Perché io, perché non tu (2009) B and Cronaca di un'attesa (2011).
