= Giuseppe Ferrara =

Italian film director

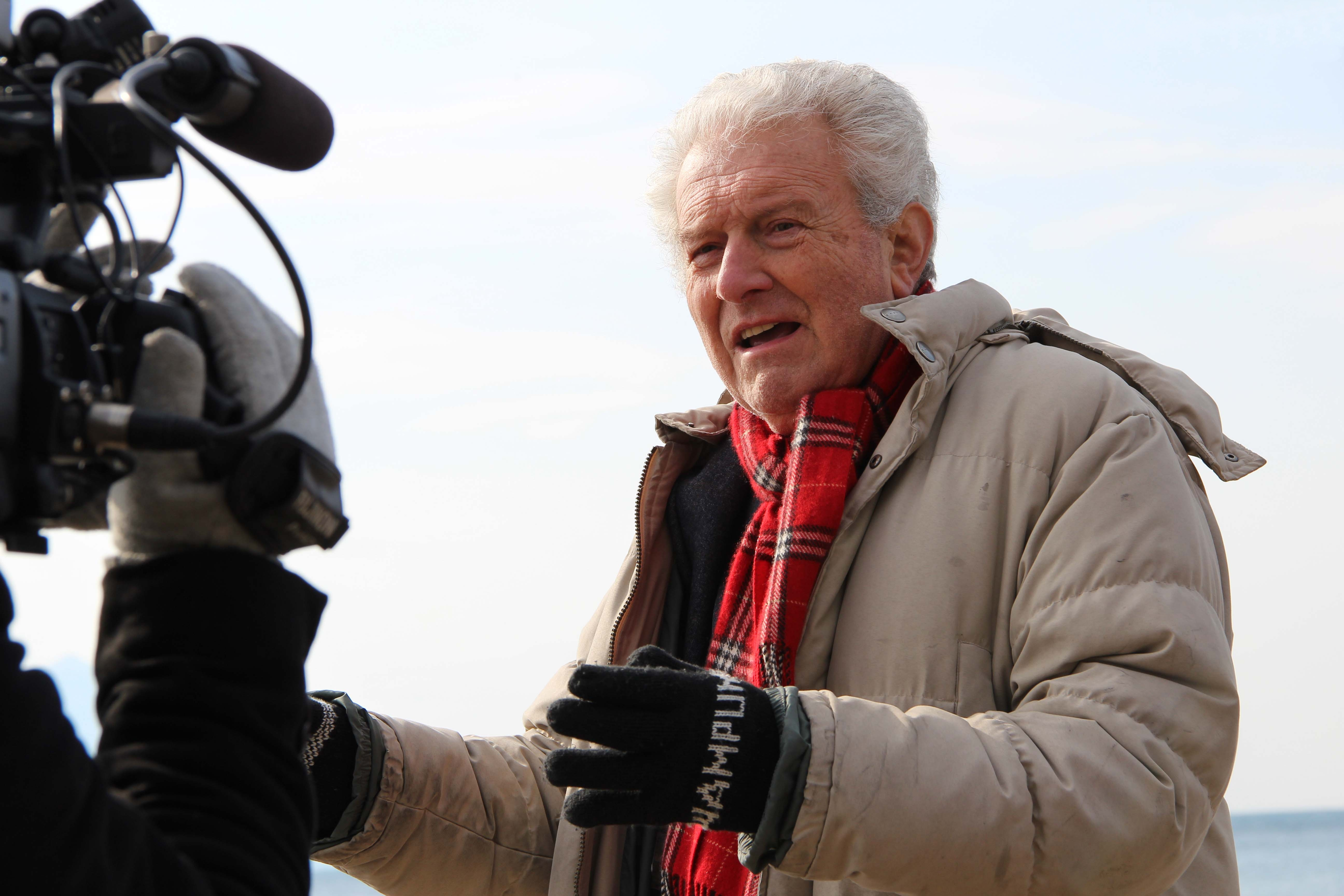
- Born: 15 July 1932; Castelfiorentino, Italy
- Died: 25 June 2016 (aged 83); Rome, Italy
- Occupations: Film director Screenwriter
- Years active: 1960–2016

Giuseppe Ferrara (15 July 1932 – 25 June 2016) was an Italian film director and screenwriter.

== Biography ==
Born in Castelfiorentino, near Florence, he founded at the high school an innovative film club, which proposes and critically analyzes neorealism movies; since then he showed a character of "novelty", often considered as "subversive".

He graduated from the University of Florence with a thesis on the "New Italian Cinema", Ferrara then moved to Rome to attend the directing course at the Experimental Centre of Cinematography and degreed in 1959, but hardly managed to find interesting opportunities, also because of his rather transparent political opinions. He continued, despite many difficulties and impediments, especially related to finance and production, his activities as a documentary and short filmmaker.

After shooting several documentaries in the 1960s, he began making fictional films in the mid 1970s. His most famous film is The Moro Affair (1986), which was awarded with the Silver Bear for Best Actor for Gian Maria Volonté at the 37th Berlin International Film Festival. His 1995 film State Secret was entered into the 19th Moscow International Film Festival.

He taught "Science and Technologies of Artistic Productions" at the University of Perugia. Ferrara died of cardiac arrest on 25 June 2016, a few days before his 84th birthday.

== Selected filmography ==
- Faccia di spia (1975)
- Cento giorni a Palermo (1984)
- The Moro Affair (1986)
- Giovanni Falcone (1993)
- State Secret (1995)
- The Bankers of God: The Calvi Affair (2002)
