= Potere Operaio =

Radical left-wing Italian political group

Workers' Power Potere Operaio
- Abbreviation: Pot. Op.
- Leader: Sergio Bologna; Toni Negri; Lanfranco Pace; Oreste Scalzone; Mario Dalmaviva
- Secretary: Franco Piperno
- Founded: 1967
- Dissolved: 3 June 1973
- Merged into: Autonomia Operaia
- Newspaper: Potere Operaio
- Ideology: Operaismo; Libertarian Marxism
- Political position: Far-left

Potere Operaio (Italian for "Workers' Power") was a radical left-wing Italian political group, active between 1967 and 1973.

== History ==
Among the group's leaders were Antonio Negri, Nanni Balestrini, Franco Piperno, Oreste Scalzone and Valerio Morucci, who led its clandestine armed wing. It was part of the "workerist" movement (operaismo), leading to the later development of the autonomist movement.

Potere Operaio's main sphere of operations was in factories, especially big factories in the industrial North, and publishing newspapers and leaflets. It sought to base its Marxist theory on the everyday life of supposedly revolutionary factory workers.

Potere Operaio officially ceased to exist on 3 June 1973. Most of its core members went on to be involved in Autonomia Operaia, signalling the shift from operaismo to autonomism. Some of the leaders later drifted towards more radical groups such as the Red Brigades, including Morucci and Adriana Faranda, who took part in the Moro murder. Negri was arrested in the late 1970s, accused of being the leader of the Red Brigades, before being cleared of charges. Oreste Scalzone also was arrested, in connection with violent acts.

Ex-member Achille Lollo died in August 2021. He had been sentenced for murder and arson for his role in the Primavalle fire, along with two other members of the group.

Potere Operaio should not be confused with "Potere Operaio Pisano" which was one of the components of a competing revolutionary group, Lotta Continua.

== See also ==
- Autonomia Operaia
- Autonomism
- Operaismo
- Pouvoir Ouvrier
- Prima Linea
- Years of Lead (Italy)
