= Valerio Morucci =

Italian former terrorist (born 1949)

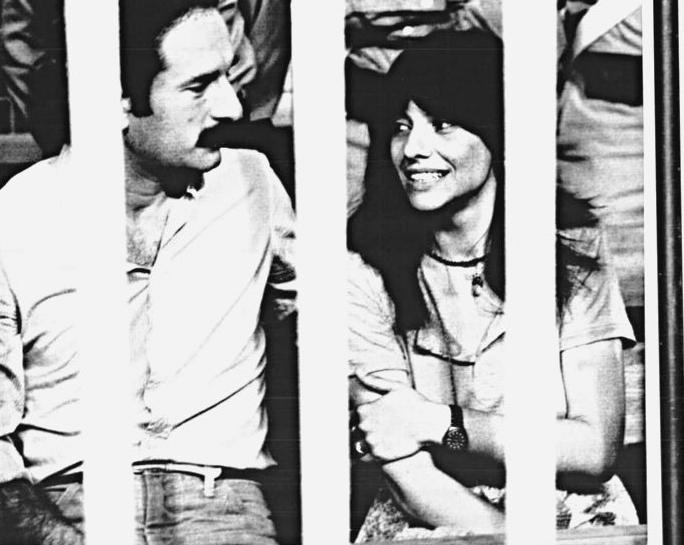
Morucci and Adriana Faranda (1980)

Valerio Morucci (born 22 July 1949) is an Italian terrorist, who was a member of the Red Brigades and who took part in the kidnapping and assassination of Aldo Moro in 1978.

== Biography ==
Morucci was born in Rome. He took part in the libertarian movement of 1968, and later entered Potere Operaio, a far-left organization. After the dissolution of Potere Operaio in 1973, he tried to form several political-military organizations including the Formazioni Comuniste Armate (FCA), which were absorbed by the Red Brigades (Italian: Brigate Rosse, or BR) in 1976.

Morucci, considered an expert in weapons and military organizations, became the leader of BR's "column" in Rome. In March 1978, he took part in the ambush in via Fani in which the escort of former prime Minister Aldo Moro was massacred, and during which Moro was allegedly kidnapped. According to the official reconstruction of the events which followed, Morucci disturbed all the communications of the BR and was allegedly against the final decision (attributed to BR national leader Mario Moretti) to kill Moro. He also entered in contact with Lanfranco Pace and Franco Piperno (in turn in contact with the Italian Socialist Party, one of the few political forces favourable to negotiations to liberate Moro).

According to his declarations during the ensuing trials, Morucci escorted the red Renault 4 in which Moro's corpse was found on 9 May 1978 to its discovery location in via Caetani. He subsequently made the phone call announcing to the victim's relatives where Moro could be found. Morucci's voice has been identified as that which called Moro's family several times during the latter's time in captivity (aside from a call by Moretti on 30 April 1978).

Morucci was arrested in 1979. Due to his subsequent dissociation from BR, and the information given about the organization, he was paroled. His sentence expired in 1994. He wrote several books, including Ritratto di un terrorista da giovane, in which he tells about his life before his militancy in the Red Brigades, La peggio gioventù, about his militancy in the BR, and Patrie galere. Cronache dall'oltrelegge, about his detention years.

== See also ==
- Kidnapping of Aldo Moro
