= Kidnapping and murder of Aldo Moro =

Abduction and murder of Italian statesman

- Part of the Years of Lead
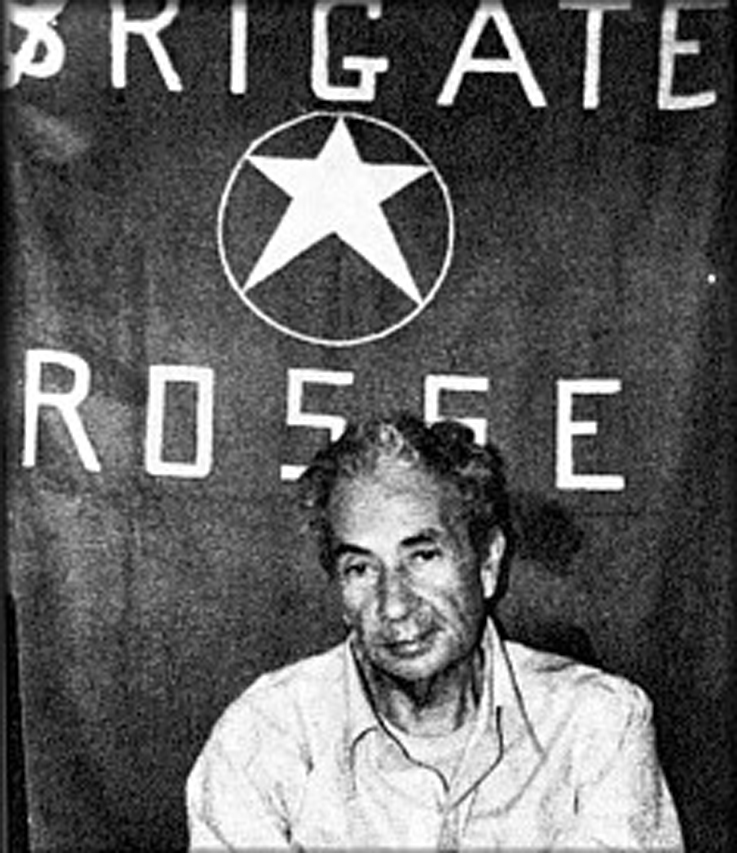
- Moro during his imprisonment
- Location: Rome, Italy
- Date: 16 March – 9 May 1978
- Attack type: Kidnapping; Murder
- Deaths: 6 (Aldo Moro and 5 bodyguards)
- Perpetrator: Red Brigades

The kidnapping and murder of Aldo Moro, also referred to in Italy as the Moro case (Italian: caso Moro), was a seminal event in Italian political history. On the morning of 16 March 1978, the day on which a new cabinet led by Giulio Andreotti was to have undergone a confidence vote in the Italian Parliament, the car of Aldo Moro, former prime minister and then president of the Christian Democracy party (Italian: Democrazia Cristiana, or DC, Italy's relative majority party at the time), was assaulted by a group of far-left terrorists known as the Red Brigades (Italian: Brigate Rosse, or BR) in via Fani in Rome. Firing automatic weapons, the terrorists killed Moro's bodyguards — two Carabinieri in Moro's car and three policemen in the following car — and kidnapped him. The events remain a national trauma. Ezio Mauro of La Repubblica described the events as Italy's 9/11. While Italy was not the sole European country to experience extremist terrorism, which also occurred in France, Germany, Ireland, and Spain, the murder of Moro was the apogee of Italy's Years of Lead.

On 9 May 1978, Moro's body was found in the boot of a Renault 4 in via Caetani after 54 days of imprisonment. Moro had been subjected to a political trial by a "people's court" set up by the BR, which had asked the Italian government for an exchange of prisoners. The car with Moro's body was found very close to both locations of the national offices of the DC and the Italian Communist Party (Italian: Partito Comunista Italiano, or PCI, the largest Communist party of Western Europe) in Rome. The BR were opposed to Moro and the PCI's Historic Compromise. On 23 January 1983, an Italian court sentenced 32 members of the BR to life imprisonment for their role in the kidnapping and murder of Moro, among other crimes. Many elements and facts have never been fully cleared up, despite a series of trials, and this has led to the promotion of a number of alternative theories about the events, including conspiracy theories.

== Kidnapping ==
=== Via Fani assault ===
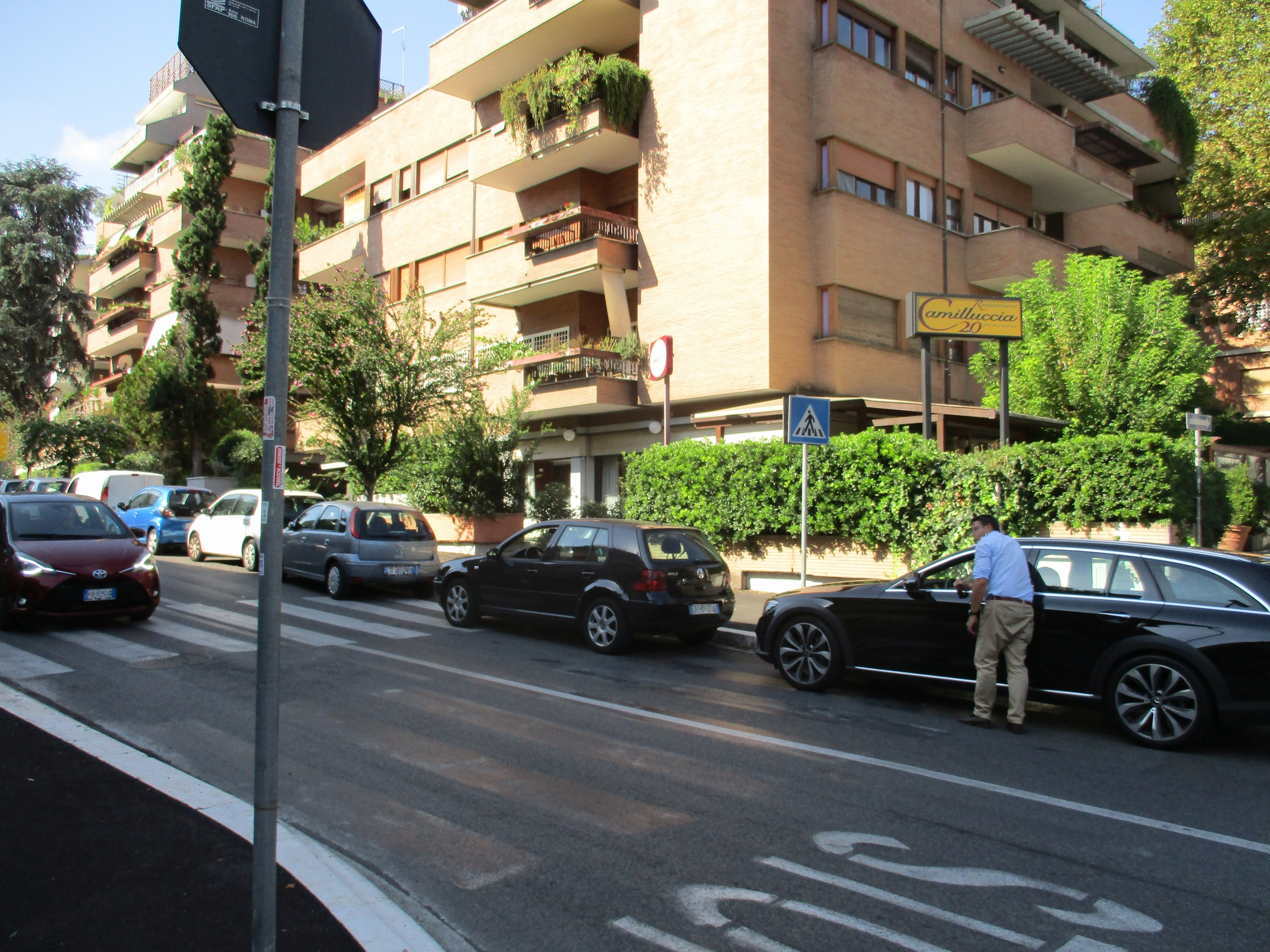
Via Mario Fani where Moro was kidnapped on 16 March 1978

The terrorists had prepared an ambush by parking two cars in via Mario Fani that, once moved, would prevent Moro's cars from escaping. According to the official reconstruction at the subsequent trials, eleven people participated in the assault. Other reconstructions report the presence of ten persons, including a lookout, and others mention up to twenty people taking part in the ambush. Doubts have been cast on the terrorists' declarations, which formed the basis for the official accounts, and about the exact identity of the ambush team's members. The presence of Moro himself in via Fani during the ambush has also been questioned following revelations in the 1990s. According to the findings from the judiciary investigations, eleven people took part in the implementation of the plan. The number and the identity of the actual participants has been questioned several times, and even the confessions of the BR have been contradictory on some points.

At 08:45, the BR members took their positions at the end of via Fani, a downhill street in the northern quarter of Rome. Four of them were wearing Alitalia airline crew uniforms. Since not all team members knew each other, the uniforms were needed to avoid friendly fire. In the upper part of the road and on the right-hand side, Mario Moretti was inside a Fiat 128 displaying a fake diplomatic license plate. Alvaro Lojacono and Alessio Casimirri were in another Fiat 128 some meters ahead. On the opposite side of the street, there was a third Fiat 128, with Barbara Balzerani inside, facing the expected direction from which Moro would arrive. Bruno Seghetti occupied a fourth car, a Fiat 132, near the crossroads where the street ended. Moro left his house a few minutes before 09:00 in a blue Fiat 130 driven by Domenico Ricci. Another Carabiniere, the marshal Oreste Leonardi, sat beside him. Leonardi was the head of the bodyguard team. The Fiat 130 was followed by a white Alfetta with the three remaining bodyguards: Francesco Zizzi, Giulio Rivera, and Raffaele Iozzino.

The ambush began at 9:00 when the two cars with Moro and his bodyguards entered via Fani. Rita Algranati, a lookout posted at the corner of via Trionfale, waved a bunch of flowers to alert the terrorists and then drove off on a moped. Moretti's Fiat 128 swerved into the road in front of Moro's car, which bumped into the rear of Moretti's car and remained blocked between it and the bodyguards' Alfetta. Ricci tried an escape manoeuver but was thwarted by a Mini Minor casually parked at the crossroad. Moro's cars were finally trapped from behind by Lojacono's 128. At this point, four armed terrorists jumped out from the bushes at the sides of the street, firing machine pistols; the judiciary investigations identified them as Valerio Morucci, Raffaele Fiore, Prospero Gallinari, and Franco Bonisoli. This maneuver is similar to one used by the German far-left Red Army Faction (RAF). One unidentified witness declared that a German voice was heard during the ambush, which led to a presumption of the participation of RAF militiamen in the ambush.

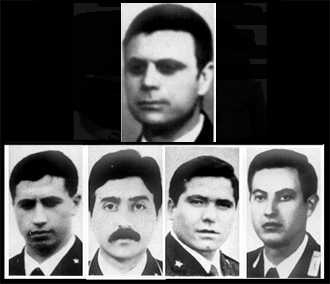
The victims of the via Fani attack. Above is Oreste Leonardi, from left to right are Raffaele Iozzino, Francesco Zizzi, Giulio Rivera, and Domenico Ricci.

At 9:03, an anonymous call to the 1–1–3 emergency service (Polizia di Stato) declared that there had been a shooting in via Fani. 91 bullets were fired, 45 of which hit the bodyguards, who were all killed. 49 shots came from a single weapon, a FNAB-43 submachine gun, and 22 from another of the same model. The remaining 20 shots came from other weapons which included a Beretta M12. Ricci and Leonardi, who were sitting in the front seat of the first car, were killed first. Moro was immediately kidnapped and forced into the Fiat 132, which was next to his car. At the same time, the terrorists shot the other three policemen. The only policeman who was able to shoot back twice was Iozzino; he was immediately hit in the head by Bonisoli. All the guards but Francesco Zizzi, who died in the hospital a few hours later, died at the scene. The blue Fiat 132 was found at 09:40 in via Licinio Calvo with blood stains inside. The other cars used in the ambush were also found in the following days in the same road; according to the declarations of the BR members, the cars had been left in the road that same day.

On 16 March, the escort in via Fani was not carrying weapons, which were instead kept in the boot of the cars; Moro's wife Eleonora Chiavarelli said during the trial that the weapons were in the boot because "these people didn't know how to use weapons because they had never had any shooting practice, they were not used to handling them, so the guns were in the boot. Leonardi always talked about it. 'These people shouldn't have weapons they don't know how to use. They should know how to use them. They should carry them properly. Keep them within reach. The radio should be operational, but it doesn't work.' For months it had been going on like this. Marshal Leonardi and Lance Corporal Ricci did not expect an ambush, because their weapons were placed in the bag and one of the two holsters was even in a plastic liner." Chiavarelli's last statement was disputed by Leonardi's widow, who stated that her husband "recently went around armed because he had noticed that a car was following him." In the procedural documents, there are references to numerous requests from the foreman and from Moro himself for the concession of an armoured car. On 6 December 2017, the latest Massacre Commission stated that an armoured car could have been enough to prevent the via Fani attack.

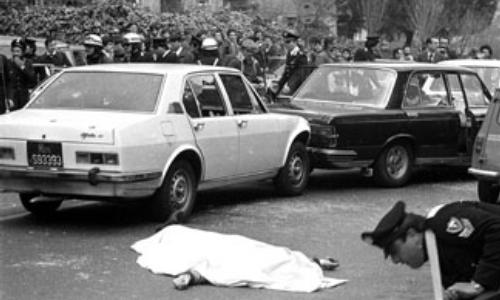
A picture of the events after the assault

The Red Brigades claimed responsibility for the attack in a phone call to ANSA. At 10:00, Pietro Ingrao, then-president of Italy's Chamber of Deputies, stopped the parliamentary session and announced that Moro had been kidnapped. In the election on the same day, the fourth Andreotti government received a large majority of votes, including those of his traditional enemies, notably the PCI. Before the kidnapping, the PCI were supposed to enter the government in a direct role but the emergency changed the situation, resulting in another cabinet under the firm control of the DC. The PCI secretary Enrico Berlinguer spoke of "an attempt to stop a positive political process", while Lucio Magri, representative of the Proletarian Unity Party, was concerned about the hypocrisy of passing laws limiting personal freedom as a reaction to the massacre, saying that "it would play into the hands of the strategy of subversion". He asked for introspection from the authorities and for a genuine willingness to tackle problems that, in his own words, "are at the basis of the economic and moral crisis".

Mario Ferrandi, a militant of Prima Linea nicknamed Coniglio (Rabbit), later said that when the news of the kidnapping and the killing of the bodyguards spread during a workers' demonstration, there was a moment of amazement, which was followed by a moment of euphoria and anxiety because there was a feeling that something would happen so big that things would not be quite the same. He recalled that students present at the event spent the money of Cassa del circolo giovanile to buy champagne and toast with workers of the canteen.

=== Motivations ===
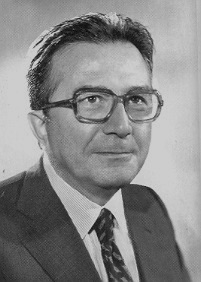
Giulio Andreotti in 1979

A large amount of literature has been written about the reasons for the kidnapping. The BR's kidnappings were different from those in Latin American or European groups in that, with two major exceptions, they had been pursued not for immediate practical possibilities but for symbolic goals, where the targeted symbol represented an action towards the symbolized entity. Initially, the BR focused on managerial staff and right-wing trade unionists from the country's largest firms, such as Alfa Romeo, Fiat, and Sit-Siemens. By 1974, with the decrease of working-class mobilization, they shifted focus from the factory to the state and its institutions; in 1976, they particularly described the magistrature as "the weakest link in the chain of power". Subsequently, they began targeting politicians. Since 1972, the BR had carried out eight other symbolic kidnappings. They all followed a similar strategy in which the victim was subjected to a summary trial and held in captivity for a period between 20 minutes to 55 days, and then released unharmed. Moro's, the ninth of those symbolic kidnappings, was the only one to result in murder.

The BR chose Moro due to his role as mediator between Christian Democracy (DC) and the Italian Communist Party (PCI), the two main parties in Italy at the time, which had both participated in the fourth Andreotti government. It would have been the first time since 1947 that the PCI had a government position, even if an indirect one. The success of the kidnapping would thus have halted the PCI's rise to Italian state institutions, reaffirming the BR as a key point in a future revolutionary war against capitalism. According to others, such as Sergio Zavoli, the BR aimed to strike at the whole DC, who were the main exponent of a regime that, as described in BR's first communiqué after the kidnapping "had been suppressing the Italian people for years". While the BR described the DC as their main enemy as early as 1975, when its offices began to be destroyed or ransacked, physical violence began in 1977 and escalated in Moro's murder. According to later terrorist declarations, in the months before the kidnapping the BR had also envisaged the kidnapping of the other DC leader, Giulio Andreotti. This was abandoned once they deemed that Andreotti's police protection was too strong. Although increasingly weakened, the DC remained the main government party until 1994. In 1981, Giovanni Spadolini, a non-DC member, became the prime minister of Italy in a DC-based alliance; it was the first time since the formation of the Italian Republic. Other three non-DC later became premier in a DC-based alliance: Bettino Craxi (in 1983), Giuliano Amato (in 1992), and Carlo Azeglio Ciampi (in 1993). The immediate consequence of the kidnapping was the exclusion of PCI from any government cabinet in the following years.

Throughout their existence, the BR were generally opposed by other far-left groups, such as Lotta Continua and Potere Operaio, and were isolated from the Italian political left, including by the PCI, which took a hard stand against terrorism and Moro's kidnapping; the BR opposed their Historic Compromise with Moro and the DC. With the kidnapping and murder of Moro, they were instrumental in blocking the PCI's road to government. In the words of historian David Broder, rather than causing through their actions a radicalization of the Italian political landscape as they had hoped, their actions resulted in an anti-communist blowback and a decline for the extra-parliamentary left. During this time, the BR's activities were denounced by Lotta Continua and Potere Operaio, which were closer to the autonomist movement. Those like Lotta Continua shared the need for armed self-defense against police and fascist violence but were critical of terrorist actions, which they saw as elitist and counterproductive, and condemned the BR as a catalyst rather than an answer to repression. Lotta Continua questioned the BR's claim that eliminating individual capitalists would have strengthened class organization. After its dissolution, the Lotta Continua continuity paper headlined "neither with the state nor the Red Brigades".

=== Imprisonment ===
The exact location of Moro's imprisonment is disputed. The original reconstruction in the trials stated that it was an apartment in via Camillo Montalcini 8 in Rome, which had been owned by a BR member for a few years, and that Moro was killed there in an underground parking garage. Months after the kidnapping, that apartment was put under investigation by UCIGOS, the Italian police's central directorate for political crimes, and was thus abandoned by the Red Brigades.

Moro's brother Carlo Alfredo, a judge and author of Storia di un delitto annunciato, argued that Moro was not detained in via Montalcini but in a seaside location. His theory is based on the fact that sand and vegetation remains were found in the car together with Moro's body. Furthermore, Moro's body had a generally good muscular tone and in his view this, along with several contradictions in the terrorists' declarations, contravened the traditional view that Moro was closed in a very tight cell with little space to move. More evidence was found by geologist David Bressan, who showed that based on certain microfossils and grains of igneous rock found on the victim and car, Moro must have been located on an artificial beach, as opposed to a natural river beach near the delta of the river Tiber. While the kidnappers later claimed to have tried to mislead the investigators by pouring water and sand onto the victim and into the car, forensic geologists expressed doubt that the killers at the time would have been aware of grains of sand as possible evidence for a crime and would not likely have gone through such effort.

=== Aldo Moro's letters ===
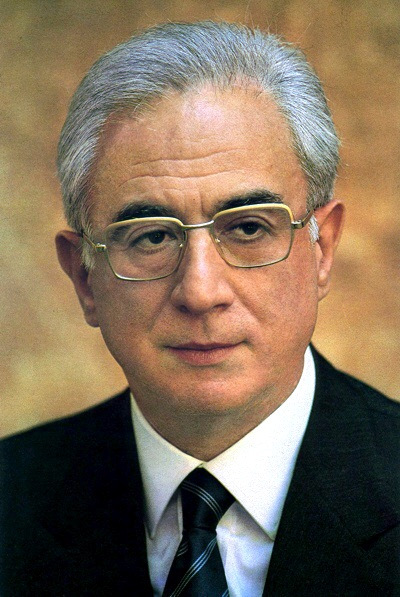
Francesco Cossiga, who led the crisis committees and was the President of the Italian Republic between 1985 and 1992

During his captivity, Moro wrote 86 letters to the main members of the DC, his family, and to Pope Paul VI. Some arrived at their addressees, while others that had not been sent were later found in another base of the BR in via Monte Nevoso, Milan. In the letters, Moro puts forward the possibility of negotiation for his liberation if help from his party's colleagues and of the highest figures of the Italian Republic could be obtained. Some of Moro's letters allegedly contain hidden allusions and hints. In one letter to Paolo Emilio Taviani sent on 9–10 April and enclosed in the BR's Communication No. 5, he asked: "Is there maybe, behind [the hardline stance towards negotiation] against me, an American or German instruction?"

Writer Leonardo Sciascia suggested that in his letters Moro was including clues about his position, as when he wrote to his wife "I am here in full health" on 27 March to indicate that he was in Rome. In the letter of 8 April, Moro launched a vibrant attack at Benigno Zaccagnini, national secretary of the DC, at Francesco Cossiga, then interior minister, as well as on the whole of his party. He wrote: "Of course, I cannot prevent myself from underlining the wickedness of all the Christian Democrats who did not agree with my position ... And Zaccagnini? How can he stay tranquil in his position? And Cossiga could not devise any possible defence? My blood will fall over them."

Doubts have been cast over the complete publication of Moro's letters. The Carabinieri general Carlo Alberto dalla Chiesa (then coordinator of the fight against terrorism in Italy, later killed by the Sicilian Mafia) found copies of some previously unknown letters in an apartment used by the terrorists in via Monte Nevoso. For undisclosed reasons, the finding was not publicly revealed for years. During the kidnapping, the prevalent view was that Moro did not enjoy complete freedom to write. Despite Moro's wife declaring that she recognized his writing style in them, the letters were considered, if not directly dictated by the terrorists, at least to be inspired or controlled by them. Some experts in an analysis committee formed by Cossiga initially declared that Moro had been subject to brainwashing. Cossiga later admitted that he had partially written the speech held by Andreotti in which it was said that Moro's letter were to be considered "not morally authentic".

That Moro was suffering from Stockholm syndrome was questioned by the two reports of the Italian Parliament's inquiry about the Moro affair. According to this view, Moro was at the height of his faculties, he was very recognizable, and at some point it was him who was leading the negotiation for his own liberation and salvation. This position was supported by Sciascia, who discussed it in the minority report he signed as a member of the first parliamentary commission and in his book L'affaire Moro. Moro was never tortured by the Red Brigades during the 55 days. In the 1990s, Indro Montanelli commented severely on the letters written during the kidnapping. He wrote: "Everyone in this world has the right to be afraid. But a statesman (and Moro was the state) can't try to induce the state to a negotiation with terrorists that overall, in the kidnapping of Via Fani, had left on the asphalt five dead between Carabinieri and policemen." He was also scathingly critical of Moro's widow, who subsequently blamed the DC and the Italian political class in general for his fate. In 1982, he wrote:

There was something almost gloating in the tone in which this black widow of politics spoke about politicians, and in her peremptory gesture of pointing her finger at everyone. At everyone, that is, except the people who killed her husband. She made no accusations against them. According to the accounts I read, she pronounced no sentences, she didn't even look at them. If it were up to her, the trial of the terrorists would have been a trial of the DC [party], of which her husband had been president; of the government of which her husband was both architect and guarantor; and of the [members of the] security services whose graves he had dug.

=== Communications and negotiations ===
Official portrait of Aldo Moro from the 1960s

During the 55 days of Moro's detention, the Red Brigades issued nine Communications in which they explained the reasons for the kidnapping. The Communication No. 3 said:

The interrogation, whose contents we already described, continues with the prisoner's full collaboration. His answers increasingly clarify the counter-revolutionary lines that the imperialist bases are carrying out; they clearly line out the contours and the body of the "new" regime that, in the restoration of the Imperialist State of the Multinationals is being established in our country and which has the Christian Democracy as its pivot. ... Moro is also acquainted that he is not the only one, that he is, indeed, the higher exponent of the regime; he thus summons the other hierarchs to share with him the responsibilities, and addresses them an appeal which sounds like an explicit call of "co-culpability".

The Red Brigades proposed to exchange Moro for imprisoned terrorists (Communication No. 8). They later accepted to exchange him for a single terrorist. On 22 April 1978, Pope Paul VI made a public speech and asked BR to return Moro to his family, specifying that such act should also be "without conditions". Moro, who had previously written a letter to the Pope, reacted angrily to the latter point, feeling he had been abandoned by the Vatican. The specified "without conditions" is controversial; according to some sources, it was added to Paul VI's letter against his will, and the pope instead wanted to negotiate with the kidnappers. Government members like Cossiga denied this hypothesis. Cossiga was notably involved in numerous scandal of Italian history, in many of which like the Piazza Fontana bombing, he had an active role in sidetracking the investigations. According to Antonio Mennini, Pope Paul VI had saved £10 billion to pay a ransom in order to save Moro.

Italian politicians were divided into two factions: one favourable to negotiations (linea del negoziato) that, amongst others, included the secretary of the Italian Socialist Party (PSI), Bettino Craxi, and the extra-parliamentary left, and the others totally negating that possibility (linea della fermezza), most of Christian Democracy (DC) and the Italian Communist Party (PCI), including the latter's national secretary Enrico Berlinguer, as well as the Italian Republican Party (PRI) leader Ugo La Malfa, who proposed the death penalty for the terrorists. The second faction alleged that any negotiation would seem a legitimization of the violence of the terrorists. Furthermore, that solution would not have been accepted by the Italian police forces who had seen numerous members fall during the war against terrorism in previous years.

Writers, including Moro's brother, underlined how the BR's communication lacked any reference to the possible role of the PCI in the Italian government. This was in spite of the day chosen for the kidnapping being that in which PCI, for the first time since the early years of the history of the Italian Republic, was going to obtain an active government role in Italy. A letter by Moro to Zaccagnini, in which he was referring to this argument, had to be rewritten. A second point put forward was the premise that Moro's revelations, from most of the communication during his people's trial by the BR, would have been made public. Unlike other people kidnapped by the BR and subjected to same procedure, such as judge Giovanni D'Urso, and in spite of the unprecedented repetition of the point, in the case of Moro, this never happened. Much of the material collected by the terrorists, including Moro's letter and personal notes written during his imprisonment, became public only after the discovery of the base in via Monte Nevoso. The terrorists later declared they had destroyed all the material containing references to Operation Gladio discovered in 1990.

Montanelli sided in favour of firmness and against the negotiations from the first day. In 2000, responding to a reader on Corriere della Sera, he wrote:

My opinion remains that expressed on my Giornale the day after the crime. "If the state, bowing to blackmail, negotiates with the violence that has already left on the pavement five corpses of Moro's bodyguards, thereby recognizing crime as a legitimate interlocutor, has no reason, as a state, to exist." This was the position that we took from day one and fortunately it found in Parliament two determinants political forces (the Italian Communist Party of Berlinguer and the Italian Republican Party of La Malfa) and one reluctant between tears and sobs (the Christian Democracy of Zaccagnini). This was the "plot" that led to the hesitant "no" of the state, to the subsequent death of Moro, but shortly after to the Red Brigades' surrender. Of the tittle-tattle and suspicions that have been embroidered around, and who occasionally crop up still, was never brought a shred of evidence, and are only the result of the complainer momism of a people cowardly, unable even to conceive that a state can react with hardness, against those who offend the law.

Among those who supported the hardline, one argument is that it would have been seen as an incentive for more kidnappings and criminal acts as a way to blackmail and extort the state. In the words of Massimo Fini, "[t]he day after, the Red Brigades would have kidnapped any Andrea Bianchi and the state would have found itself faced with the alternative: accept the blackmail again or refuse it. If they had accepted it, step by step, the dissolution of the state would have been achieved; if they had not accepted it, it would have been demonstrated, I would say plastically, that in Italy there are citizens of first and second class. And the day after the Red Brigades could have opened a door with the words, almost banking, 'registration to the BR'. And many citizens would have rushed there. In short, in one case or another, the state would have signed its dissolution." Journalist Ezio Mauro argued that negotiations would have been an error, saying: "The only possible solution would have been — had the state apparatus been more efficient and less polluted — to find his prison and free him. I remain convinced that firmness in dealing with the terrorists was the right choice."

For those who opposed the hardline, Moro ultimately suffered from this line, and some saw it as a betrayal. They point to other states, such as Germany and Israel, that in practice do not follow a hardline but are pragmatic, depending on the circumstances and interlocutors. Even these that deny in principle any negotiation and ransom payment by the state circumvented these claims through private insurance companies and contractors, such as the United States. Critics point to the April 1981 kidnapping of Ciro Cirillo, another DC member kidnapped by the BR, where the state negotiated and paid the ransom. The outcome of the Cirillo kidnapping stood in sharp contrast to of Moro. When Moro was abducted by the BR in 1978, the DC-led government immediately took a hardline position: the "state must not bend" on terrorist demands. They refused to negotiate with the BR, while local DC members in Campania made every effort and even negotiated with criminals to release Cirillo, a relatively minor politician in comparison with Moro. Some argued that the PCI and Berlinguer were the ones who should have pushed Craxi's and the PSI line of negotiation to save Moro's life. The PSI politician Claudio Signorile had apparently convinced Fanfani to negotiate with the BR in order to save Moro. There was a conversation between Signorile and PCI politicians Luciano Barca and Gerardo Chiaromonte, in which they said that "precisely because the DC is expressing itself against Craxi's attempt, your openness is desirable, which would have the effect of improving relations between the PSI and the PCI."

=== Discovery of the body ===
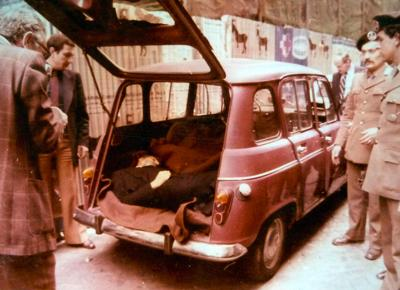
9 May 1978: Moro found dead in via Caetani in the Renault 4

Communication No. 9 stated: "For what concerns our proposal of an exchange of political prisoners in order to suspend the condemnation and to release Aldo Moro, we can only record the clear refusal from the DC. We thus conclude the battle begun on 16 March, executing the sentence to which Aldo Moro has been condemned." The depositions made to the Italian judges during the trials showed that not all the BR leaders were for condemning Moro to death. Moretti called Moro's wife by phone, asking her to push the DC leaders for negotiations.

Adriana Faranda, a member of the BR, mentioned a night meeting held in Milan a few days before the murder of Moro where she and other terrorists, including Morucci and Bonisoli, dissented; the final decision was taken after voting. On 9 May 1978, after a summary people's trial, Moro was murdered by Moretti, as he himself admitted, with the participation of Maccari, who was later revealed to be the fourth man. For many years, before Moretti's admission, it was thought that Gallinari was the one to murder Moro. Years later, Maccari admitted his role in the events, and confirmed that it was Moretti the one to shoot Moro. Maccari said: "My thoughts go to Moro's widow and family. I would like to ask their forgiveness but I fear that by doing so I could continue to offend them."

Moro's body was found that same day in the boot of a red Renault 4 in via Michelangelo Caetani in the historic centre of Rome. The location was mentioned by journalist Carmine Pecorelli as the residence of opera conductor Igor Markevitch who, according to some theories, was the alleged instigator of the whole kidnapping or had a leading role, including Moro's interrogatories, and allegedly hosted the BR. According to the terrorist's declarations made some ten years after the event, Moro was woken up at 06:00 with the excuse that he had to be moved to another secret base. In contradiction to this, Bonisoli said that Moro was told that he had been pardoned and was going to be freed.

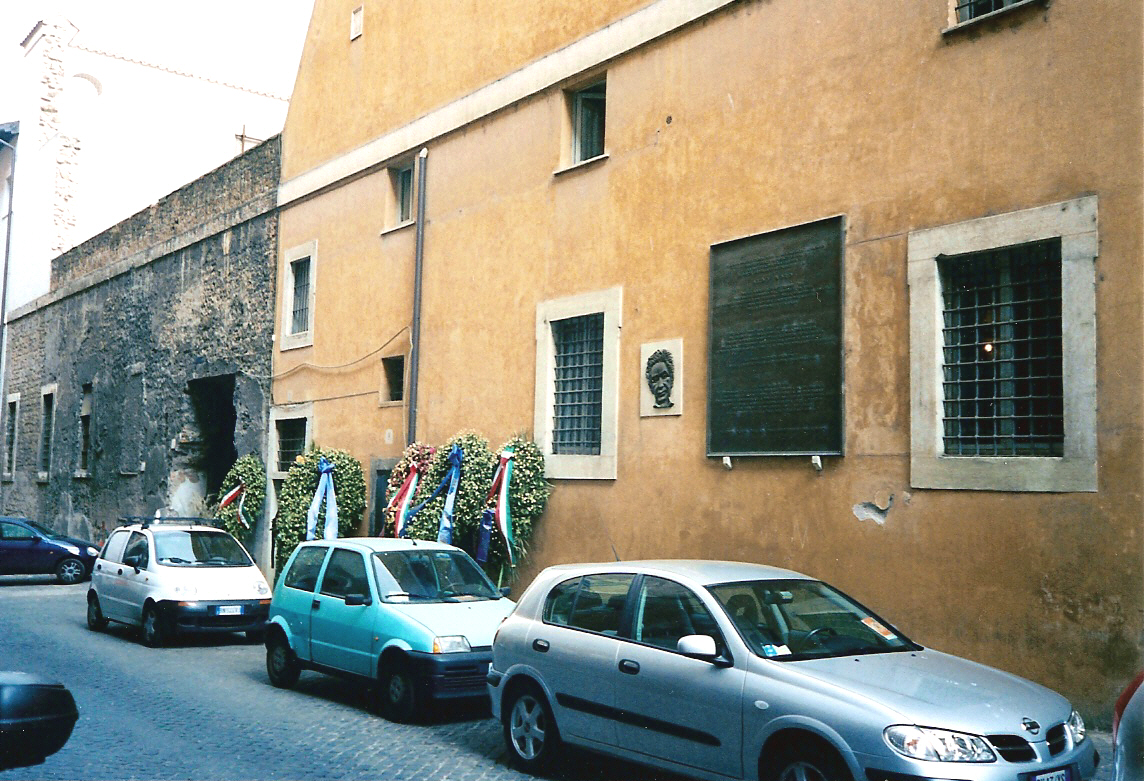
The location where Moro's body was found, in via Caetani, rione Sant' Angelo. A plaque commemorates him.

The terrorists put him into a wicker basket and brought him to the parking garage of their base in via Montalcini. They put him into the boot of a red Renault; after covering him with a red sheet, Moretti shot Moro with a 9 mm Walther PPK and after the weapon jammed, a 7.65 mm Škorpion vz. 61. The bullets perforated Moro's lungs and killed him. The car with his body was taken to via Caetani where it was parked about one hour after the murder. The common interpretation was that the location was midway between the national seats of DC and of the PCI in Rome to symbolize the end of the Historic Compromise, the alliance between the DC and the PCI that Moro had sought. In fact, the car was found more towards the river Tiber, near the ghetto. At 12:30, a phone call was made to Francesco Tritto, the assistant of Moro, in order to let him announce the location of the body. This fulfilled a will explicitly communicated by Moro to his kidnappers. At 13:30, a phone call, attributed to Morucci, notified the Prefecture of Police that Moro's body was in a car in via Caetani. The autopsy made after the discovery assigned the death to around 09:00 and 10:00 of the same day, in contradiction to the terrorist's declarations. Witnesses declared that the car was in the street as early as 08:00 a.m., while some witnesses declared that they did not see it before 12:30 a.m.

Moro was wearing the same grey clothes he had during the kidnapping. The cravat had several blood stains, traces of sand were found in the pockets and socks, and traces of vegetation were also found. Eventually, the terrorists declared that they had intentionally added those traces in order to sidetrack the investigators. In the boot, there were also some of Moro's personal effects, a bracelet and his watch, and some spent cartridges. Moro also had a thigh wound, likely suffered during the initial assault in via Fani.

== Subsequent hypotheses, investigations, and trials ==
Despite the long investigations and trials, the exact details of the kidnapping and murder of Moro are not known. This led to the rise and popularization of a number of other alternative theories about the events, and the judicial truth, which attributes responsibility for the operation exclusively to the Red Brigades, has failed to take root in the collective memory of Italians. Some of those are conspiracy theories involving the Italian government, the CIA, Henry Kissinger, Mossad, and the KGB, among other entities and individuals either individually or in different combinations. Conspiracy theorists hold that Moro, a progressive who wanted the PCI to be part of government, was ultimately sacrificed due to Cold War politics, that both sides welcomed his kidnapping, and that, by refusing to negotiate, they led to his death. The judges investigating the Moro affair dismissed these conspiracy theories, arguing that there is no evidence to support those interpretations of the Moro murder case, and while acknowledging that Moro had powerful political enemies, they insisted that conspiracy theorists had made too many assumptions.

On 7 April 1979, the operaismo philosopher Antonio Negri was arrested along with the other persons associated with the Autonomist movement. Negri was charged with a number of offences including leadership of the Red Brigades, masterminding the kidnapping and murder of Moro and plotting to overthrow the government. A year later, Negri was exonerated from Moro's kidnapping. No link was ever established between Negri and the Red Brigades, and almost all of the charges against him (including seventeen murders) were dropped within months of his arrest due to lack of evidence.

Because there remains several unclear aspects and it is widely acknowledged, including by the judges themselves, failures on the part of the police, alternative and conspiracy theories are widely popoluar. Twenty years after Moro's death, The New York Times reported on the popularity of such conspiracy theories, and that few Italians believe in the official version of the Moro's affair, namely that only the Red Brigades bore responsibility for Moro's murder and that the Italian government did its best to save Moro. The belief was that the police did not do all they could to save Moro. Alessandra Stanley wrote: "The only prominent dissenters are Mr. Andreotti and his closest aides, some former Red Brigades terrorists who still resist the notion that they were unwittingly manipulated by sinister right-wing forces, and an American scholar, Richard Drake, who wrote a 1995 book that concluded that there was no conspiracy. Mr. Drake's book was widely disparaged in Italy." Marco Baliani, who had a one-man show about the Moro case, said: "It has been 20 years, and still the deeper truth has not come out. How can we found a new republic if we cannot tell the truth to ourselves?" Many books have been written that question the Moro affair's trials since the 1980s. They continued to be published well into the 2020s, one example being Aldo Moro. Una verità compromessa.

In 2013, Ferdinando Imposimato, one of the judges of the Moro case, said that Moro was murdered by the Red Brigades with the complicity of Andreotti, Cossiga, and Nicola Lettieri. He added that if some documents had not been hidden from him, he would have indicted them for complicity in association in the Moro case, including for the Piazza Fontana bombing (by far-right Ordine Nuovo) and the Via D'Amelio bombing (by the Sicilian Mafia). Rome's public prosecutor office had opened an investigation file relating to the statements of two bomb squad members, Vitantonio Raso and Giovanni Circhetta, who were never questioned and said that they arrived at the location two hours before the call from the Red Brigades. In 2014, the first edition of Aldo Moro: Il Partito Democratico vuole la verità, was published. Gero Grassi, a former DC member and by then a member of the Democratic Party, which was founded in 2007 as a merger of the PCI's legal successor parties and the DC's left wings, was a member of the Commission of Inquiry into the Moro Case and author of the parliamentary volume. He said that the reports of the Moro Commission, which was approved by the Chamber of Deputies and the Senate of the Republic, overturned the judicial and historical truth. According to this reconstruction, the massacre in via Fani saw at least 20 people engaged in the scene of the crime rather than the maximum of 9 people claimed by the Red Brigades, among other inconsistencies. In November 2014, Rome's public prosecutor wrote that it was certain that in via Fani, apart from the Red Brigades, there were also elements of the Italian state's deviated secret services, men of Rome's mafia like the Banda della Magliana, and men of the European secret services.

In August 2020, about sixty individuals from the world of historical research and political inquiry signed a document denouncing the growing weight that the conspiratorial view on the kidnapping and killing of Moro has in public discourse. Historian Marco Clementi, who was one of the signatories, stated that this stance forces everyone "to measure themselves against the principle of reality". Paolo Persichetti, a writer and former Red Brigades member who signed the document, commented: "The trigger [for signing the document] was yet another fake that brought together the events related to the Bologna massacre of August 1980, which according to the sentences of the judiciary have a right-wing matrix, in any case opposite in motive, objectives, and operational practices to the making of groups of the armed revolutionary left and of the Red Brigades, genetically anti-stragista [e.g. they did not engage in massacres like that of 1980]."

=== Crisis committees ===
Francesco Cossiga, minister of the interior at the time, formed two crisis committees on the very day of the kidnapping of Moro. These included a technical-operational-political committee, chaired by Cossiga himself and in his absence by undersecretary Nicola Lettieri. Other members included the supreme commanders of the Italian police forces, the Carabinieri, the Guardia di Finanza, the recently named directors of SISMI and SISDE (respectively, Italy's military and civil intelligence services), the national secretary of CESIS (a secret information agency), the director of UCIGOS, and the police prefect of Rome. The other was an information committee, including members of CESIS, SISDE, SISMI, and SIOS, another military intelligence office. A third unofficial committee was created but never met officially; it was called the comitato di esperti (committee of experts). Its existence was not disclosed until 1981 by Cossiga himself in his interrogation by the Italian Parliament's commission about the Moro affair. He omitted to reveal the decisions and the activities of the committee. This committee included Steve Pieczenik (a psychologist of the anti-terrorism section of the U.S. State Department), criminologist Franco Ferracuti, Stefano Silvestri, Vincenzo Cappelletti (director of the Italian Encyclopedia Institute), and Giulia Conte Micheli.

Despite these changes, in the months that the kidnapping of Moro developed and executed, no secret service was designed to combat internal subversion. The committees were acting according to old standards, the planning of measures to be taken in case of emergency dating back to the 1950s, and it had not been updated even after the alarming growth of terrorism. According to Montanelli, this was because the country had spread an atmosphere of resignation, if not indulgence, to left-wing terrorism, as in the trials defendants get extenuating circumstances, Prima Linea was considered a simple subversive association (instead of an armed gang), and a part of the judiciary harbored hostility towards the state and was sympathetic to the revolutionary myths. Political scientist Giorgio Galli said that terrorism had become "a historical phenomenon understandable (though not justifiable) in a period of social change thwarted by a corrupt political class".

=== Terrorists involved in the kidnapping ===
Name	Date of capture	Sentence and outcome
Corrado Alunni	1978	Life imprisonment; paroled in 1989 due to his dissociation. Died in 2022.
Valerio Morucci	1979	32 years in prison; freed in 1994 due to his dissociation.
Barbara Balzerani	1985	Six life imprisonments; paroled in 2006. Died in 2024.
Mario Moretti	1981	Six life imprisonments; paroled in 1997.
Alvaro Lojacono	1989	Arrested in Switzerland. Life imprisonment; paroled in 2000.
Alessio Casimirri	Never	Fled to Nicaragua, where he owns a restaurant.
Rita Algranati	2004	Arrested in Cairo. Life imprisonment.
Adriana Faranda	1979	30 years of prison; paroled in 1994 due to her dissociation.
Prospero Gallinari	1979	Life imprisonment; house arrest from 1996. Died in 2013.

There have been five trials in Rome's Court of Assizes that ended with many life sentences, three inquiry commissions, and two parliamentary commissions. Moretti, who was a fugitive since 1972 and was arrested in 1981, declared in 1993 that he was the one who killed Moro. Casimirri fled to Nicaragua and was never captured. Algranati, Casimirri's wife and a fugitive since 1982, lived for many years in Managua, Nicaragua, with her husband, from whom she later separated but not officially; he remained in Nicaragua, while she left Nicaragua in the early 1990s after the end of the marriage. She moved first to Angola and then to Algeria alongside her new partner, Maurizio Falessi, another member of Rome's BR. In January 2004, they were captured in Cairo. The connivances and protections that allowed Algranati's escape and her long absence have never come to light and are still the subject of investigation. Gallinari died in 2013; he was 62. In 2023, it was reported that the 77-year-old Moretti, who has been living under semi-free status since 1997, was residing in Brescia, and that he goes to work for a Brescian association through smart working and regularly returns to prison by 10 pm.

== Political consequences ==
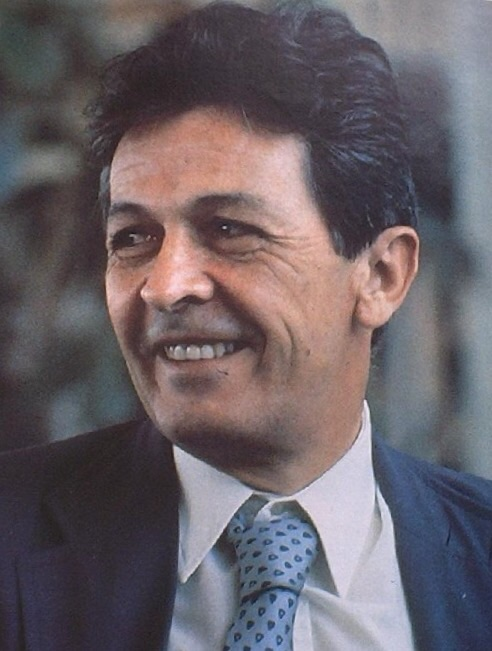
Enrico Berlinguer, leader of the Italian Communist Party

The kidnapping and murder of Moro drastically changed the politics of Italy. The Historic Compromise between the DC and the PCI, one of Moro's main goals, was not liked by Italy's main international partners. On 23 March 1976, Moro, during his tenure as prime minister, took part in the G7 conference in Puerto Rico. When he asked his colleagues' opinions about the matter, they replied to him that, if it materialized, the presence of the PCI in the executive would cause the loss of international support, including financial ones, for Italy. At the previous general elections, the DC had scored a 38%, followed by the PCI with 34%. Moro was considered a natural candidate for the next president of Italy, with the ensuing realization of the government alliance between the two parties. His assassination marked the definitive end of the Historic Compromise. Historian Francesco Barbagallo described Moro's murder as "the most dramatic and decisive event in the history of republican Italy".

On 16 March 1978, the day of Moro's kidnapping, Andreotti's cabinet obtained a vote of confidence; it was voted for by all the Italian parties, with the exception of the Italian Social Movement, the Italian Liberal Party (the first a far-right party, the second a centre-right one), the Radical Party, and Proletarian Democracy (the latter being left to far-left formations). The executive was formed exclusively by DC members and could govern only with the indirect support of the PCI (the non sfiducia, or non-no confidence). A number of other major events in Italian government took place between 1978 and 1979, in the aftermath of the assassination of Moro. On 15 June 1978, Giovanni Leone resigned as the president of Italy, leaving six months before his term because of harsh polemics and attacks on his person. A few weeks later, Sandro Pertini of the PSI was elected in a plebiscite vote. For some time, the non-no confidence government kept alive the possibility of the PCI joining the government. By January 1979, the PCI decided to withdraw its support because the conservative wing of the DC had managed to block any attempt to bring PCI ministers into the government. In January 1979, Andreotti's cabinet resigned and Pertini entrusted the task of forming a new one to Ugo La Malfa. As the attempt failed, there were new elections on 3 June 1979. In the 1979 Italian general election, the DC remained stable while the PCI suffered a sharp setback; this result marked the end of the government of national solidarity and the possibility of entry of the PCI into the executive. The PCI's road to government was effectively closed.

Moro's proposed Democracy of Alternation, in contrapposition to Berlinguer's Historic Compromise, was opposed by the United States. In an interview with Eugenio Scalfari, which was published posthumously in October 1978, Moro said: "It is not at all a good thing that my party is the essential pillar of support for Italian democracy. We have governed this country for thirty years. We govern it in a state of necessity, because there has never been a real possibility of a changeover that would not upset the institutional and international structures ... . Our democracy is lame as long as the state of necessity lasts. Until then Christian Democrats are nailed to their role as the only governing party." Neither Moro's nor Berlinguer's proposals ever came to fruition. Under the stronger influence of Ciriaco De Mita (from 1982 to 1989), Andreotti, and Arnaldo Forlani (from 1989), the DC remained a government party until 1994. In the 1992 Italian general election, the DC's share of the vote dropped for the first time below 30% due to the Lega Nord's growth in Northern Italy. Following the stresses of the Mani pulite scandal and the ties between the Mafia and Andreotti himself, which also involved the allied parties (in addition to the former PCI, which was renamed the Democratic Party of the Left, or PDS, that was involved at the local level), the DC continued to lose support. In 1994, the party was disbanded, and Mino Martinazzoli, the DC's last secretary, decided to change the name of the party to the Italian People's Party. According to the acts of the Italian Parliament's commission on terrorism, "Moro's murder, evaluated as a historical fact, appeared as the moment of greatest offensive power of the armed party [the terrorists] and, speculatively, as the moment in which the state proved itself unable to give a barely adequate reply to the subversive aggression."

== See also ==
- Assassination of Olof Palme
- Kidnapping and murder of Hanns Martin Schleyer
- October Crisis
- Terrorism in Europe

== Bibliography ==
- Bocca, Giorgio; Giacomoni, Silvia (1978). Moro: una tragedia italiana.
- Montanelli, Indro; Cervi, Mario (1991). L'Italia degli anni di piombo.
- Sciascia, Leonardo (1994). L'affaire Moro. Adelphi.
- Bo, Carlo (1988). Aldo Moro. Delitto d'abbandono.
- Biscione, Francesco (1993). Il memoriale di Moro rinvenuto in Via Monte Nevoso a Milano. Rome.
- Martinelli, Roberto; Padellaro, Antonio (1979). Il Delitto Moro. Rizzoli.
- Flamigni, Sergio; Flamigni, Sergio (1997). Il mio sangue ricadrà su di loro. Milan.
- Moro, Carlo Alfredo (1998). Storia di un delitto annunciato.
- Fasanella, Giovanni; Rocca, Giuseppe (2003). Il misterioso intermediario. Igor Markevic e il caso Moro. Turin: Einaudi. ISBN 88-06-16087-7.
- Satta, Vladimiro (2006). Il caso Moro e i suoi falsi misteri. Rubbettino, Soveria Mannelli.
- Savoia, Salvatore (2006). Aldo Moro. "... L'iniqua ed ingrata sentenza della D.C.". Massafra: Dellisanti editore.
- Bianco, Giovanni (2007). "L'affaire Moro". Mosaico di Pace. No. 6.
- Amara, Emmanuel (2008). Abbiamo ucciso Aldo Moro. La vera storia del rapimento Moro. Rome: Cooper. ISBN 978-88-7394-105-7.
- De Lutis, Giuseppe (2008). Il golpe di Via Fani. Rome.
- Galloni, Giovanni (2008). 30 anni con Aldo Moro. Rome.
- Galli, Giorgio (2008). Piombo rosso. Milan.
- Grassi, Stefano (2008). Il caso Moro. Un dizionario italiano. Milan: Mondadori.
- Provvisionato, Sandro; Imposimato, Ferdinando (2008). Doveva morire. Chi ha ucciso Aldo Moro. Il giudice dell'inchiesta racconta. Chiarelettere. ISBN 978-88-6190-025-7.
- Ratto, Pietro (2017). L'Honda anomala. Il rapimento Moro, una lettera anonima e un ispettore con le mani legate. Rome: Bibliotheka Edizioni. ISBN 978-88-6934-234-9.
