= Nadia Lioce =

Member of the Red Brigades

Nadia Desdemona Lioce (Foggia, 29 September 1959) is an imprisoned Italian member of the Red Brigades. Lioce was arrested in 2003 with Mario Galesi after a shootout on a train travelling between Rome and Florence and charged with several murders. At trial she admitted being a Brigadist and refused to speak more. She was sentenced to life imprisonment and placed in the restrictive 41-bis prison regime, which involves solitary confinement.

== Life ==
Lioce was born in Foggia and studied history at the University of Bari. In 1984, she began a relationship with Luigi Fuccini. Together they participated in the Pantera student movement and were involved with political movements associated with anti-Zionism, Sandinista solidarity and a self-managed social centre. Lioce lived in Pisa with Fuccini until 1995, when she went underground. In 2002, as part of the investigation into the 1999 murder of academic Massimo D'Antona, a pre-trial detention order was made against Lioce in absentia and five other people. The Minister of the Interior Giuseppe Pisanu later said that Lioce, alongside Mario Galesi and Michele Pegna, was a militant of the Combatant Communist Nuclei, and had joined the BR-PCC (Red Brigades – Communist Combatant Party). The original Red Brigades became famous internationally in 1978 for the kidnapping and murder of Aldo Moro.

== Arrest ==
Lioce was arrested on 2 March 2003 with Galesi after a shootout on a train travelling between Rome and Florence. When three policemen passing through the train wanted to check their identification papers, the two drew guns; a police officer, Emanuele Petri, was shot dead, Galesi was wounded and died later at the hospital while Lioce was arrested unharmed. The following year, she faced trial for the murders of D'Antona and Marco Biagi, two men who had drawn up laws restricting workers' rights and for the death of the police officer during her arrest. At the trial, prosecutors alleged that Lioce had carried out the murders and was on a mission to research a new target, because she was found in possession of a spy camera hidden in a cigarette packet. She spoke only to say "I am a political prisoner, militant of the Red Brigades [...] I don't say a word more." Analysis of Lioce's digital devices led to further arrests and in 2005 she received a sentence of life imprisonment alongside five others.

== 41-bis ==
Lioce was placed into the restrictive 41-bis prison regime, which involves solitary confinement. It began as a means for the state to break the connection of mafia prisoners with their networks; it has been expanded to militants such as Lioce and Alfredo Cospito and its imposition is almost never revoked. In 2017, Lioce was put on trial for resisting the 41-bis regime by banging a plastic bottle against the bars of her cell; she was found not guilty because the isolation imposed under 41-bis meant that she was unable to disturb anyone. Thirty-one activists protesting outside the Court of L'Aquila in support of Lioce were arrested.

In 2023, lawyers for Lioce reported that owing to the restrictive nature of 41-bis, she had only spoken to visitors for 15 hours over the course of one year. Her family told the media that when they visited she found it difficult to hold a conversation. 41-bis has been condemned by both Amnesty International and the European Court of Human Rights.
