= Kevan Thakrar =

Prisoner in UK

Kevan Thakrar (born 9 March 1987) is an English prisoner who has spent over a decade in solitary confinement in Close Supervision Centres (CSCs) in various UK prisons. Thakrar received a sentence of life imprisonment with a minimum term of 35 years under joint enterprise in 2008, after an incident in which he and his brother Miran entered a house in Bishop's Stortford, Hertfordshire, then Miran murdered three men. Whilst incarcerated, Thakrar attacked three prison officers and was acquitted by a jury after being charged with attempted murder. The United Nations Special Rapporteur on Torture and Other Cruel, Inhuman or Degrading Treatment or Punishment raised concerns about Thakrar's treatment in 2021 and Thakrar was subsequently moved into a segregated ward at HMP Belmarsh. He remains in the CSC system and launched a judicial review in April 2023.

== Murders ==
Thakrar, born c. 1987 and from Stevenage, Hertfordshire in England, was convicted in 2008 for murder. Thakrar had travelled from Stevenage to Bishop's Stortford, Hertfordshire with his brother Miran intending to confront a drug dealer about the low quality of the cocaine which Miran had bought from him. When they arrived at the meeting house, Miran Thakrar was carrying a MAC 10 submachine gun and shot dead three men and a dog, whilst the drug dealer escaped into the garden. The brothers then discovered two women and a baby upstairs and stabbed them multiple times, having run out of bullets. The women survived the attack and testified in court against the brothers. One of them said that Kevan Thakrar was holding a knife and told his brother "I can't do it", so Miran Thakrar took the knife and stabbed her.

After the attack, Miran Thakrar fled to Northern Cyprus with his girlfriend; Kevan tried to follow him and was arrested. Miran was apprehended and deported back to the UK. When the brothers stood trial at St Albans Crown Court, hearsay evidence was presented from three witnesses interviewed in Northern Cyprus who claimed that Miran had confessed to them. This evidence was then permitted to be used against Kevan Thakrar as well. Miran was found guilty of murder, attempted murder and possession of a firearm; he was sentenced to life imprisonment, the minimum term being 42 years. His girlfriend, his father and a friend were all found guilty of helping him to escape. Kevan Thakrar was also found guilty of the three murders and attempted murder under the principle of joint enterprise. He was sentenced two months later at Southwark Crown Court by Mr Justice Cooke and received a term of life imprisonment with a minimum of 35 years. He has disputed this sentence.

== Prison ==
Thakrar was incarcerated at HMP Frankland in Durham. In 2010, he engaged three prison officers with a broken bottle of hot pepper sauce in self defence as he was expecting to be attacked; as a result, he was moved to the Close Supervision Centre (CSC) at HMP Woodhill in Milton Keynes. This restrictive regime involves solitary confinement, one permitted hour of recreation per day and two 30 minute visits per month. At trial in 2011, he denied the charges of attempted murder and wounding with intent. He said he had been the victim of a racist bullying campaign by the officers and had acted in self-defence; a psychologist told the court he was suffering from post-traumatic stress disorder. The jury acquitted Thakrar. He was later awarded damages of £800 for loss of possessions including photographs when he was moved from Durham to Milton Keynes.

From 2010 onwards, Thakrar was held in CSCs at various prisons. Thakrar was again awarded damages in 2016 after his property was damaged during a move between prisons in 2013. District judge Hickman criticised the government's lawyers and awarded £1,000 to Thakrar, who had represented himself without legal aid. In 2019, Thakrar was moved to HMP Full Sutton near Pocklington in the East Riding of Yorkshire. He was later stabbed by another prisoner, in an incident which the Incarcerated Workers Organising Committee alleged was racist in motive.

In 2021, Nils Melzer (United Nations Special Rapporteur on Torture and Other Cruel, Inhuman or Degrading Treatment or Punishment) contacted the UK government and voiced concerns that "when used for more than 15 consecutive days, these conditions of detention amount to torture", when Thakrar had been held in CSCs for 11 years. Melzer noted that Thakrar received his food through a hatch in the door and had no privacy when using the toilet. A protest was held outside the prison by campaigners asking for better conditions for Thakrar and his fellow inmate Dwayne Fulgence. Thakrar was then moved to a segregated ward at HMP Belmarsh in October 2021. The same year, he was returned into solitary confinement. In April 2023, his judicial review of being in the CSC for 749 consecutive days was heard.

Kevan remains held within CSCs as of 2025, and has been awaiting judgement on the judicial review for unlawful solitary confinement since the final hearing of April 2023. He has been held in isolation for longer than any other currently detained prisoner in the UK, even achieving a total of 1300 consecutive days while awaiting a verdict for this judgement.
