= Premiership of David Cameron =

Period of the Government of the United Kingdom from 2010 to 2016

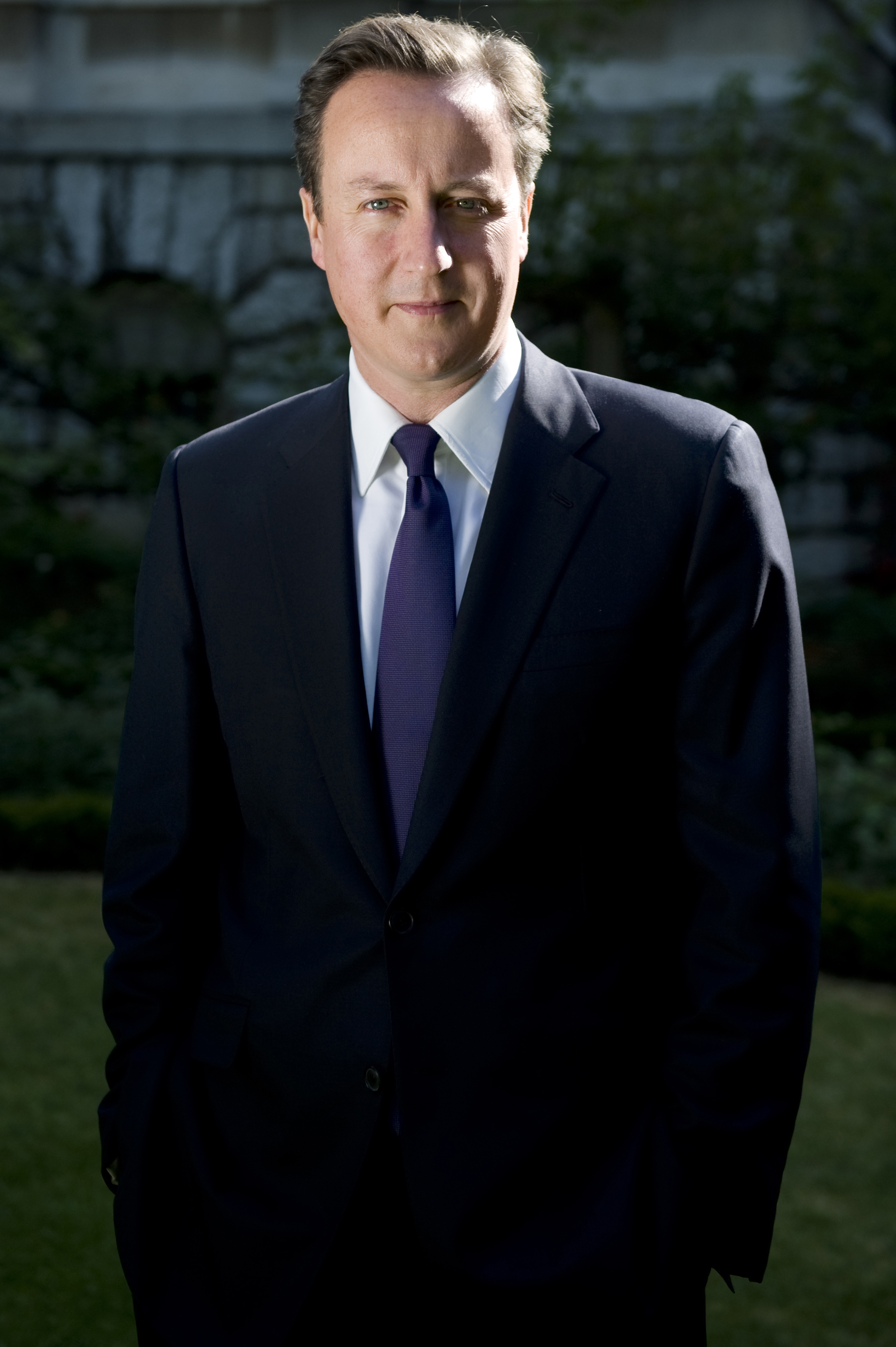
- Official portrait, 2010
- Premiership of David Cameron; 11 May 2010 – 13 July 2016
- Monarch: Elizabeth II
- Cabinet: Cameron–Clegg coalition; Second Cameron ministry
- Party: Conservative
- Election: 2010; 2015
- Seat: 10 Downing Street
- Coat of Arms of HM Government

David Cameron's tenure as Prime Minister of the United Kingdom began on 11 May 2010 when he accepted an invitation from Queen Elizabeth II to form a government, succeeding Gordon Brown of the Labour Party, and ended on 13 July 2016 upon his resignation following the 2016 referendum that favoured Brexit, which he had opposed. As prime minister, Cameron also served simultaneously as First Lord of the Treasury, Minister for the Civil Service, and Leader of the Conservative Party.

Following the 2010 general election, Cameron became prime minister at the head of a coalition government between the Conservatives and Liberal Democrats, as no party had gained an overall majority in the House of Commons for the first time since the February 1974 general election. He appointed Nick Clegg, Leader of the Liberal Democrats, Deputy Prime Minister. Between them, the Conservatives and Liberal Democrats controlled 363 seats in the House of Commons, with a majority of 76 seats.

Cameron's premiership was marked by the effects of the 2008 financial crisis and the Great Recession; these involved a large deficit in government finances that his government sought to reduce through austerity measures. His administration passed the Health and Social Care Act and Welfare Reform Act, which introduced large-scale changes to healthcare and welfare. It also enforced stricter immigration policies, introduced reforms to education and oversaw the 2012 London Olympics. It privatised the Royal Mail and legalised same-sex marriage in Great Britain. After the 2015 general election, he remained as prime minister, this time leading a Conservative-only government with a parliamentary majority of 12. To fulfil a manifesto pledge, Cameron introduced a referendum on the UK's continuing membership of the European Union in 2016. He supported the Britain Stronger in Europe campaign. Following the success of the Leave vote, Cameron resigned as prime minister and was succeeded by Theresa May, his home secretary.

As prime minister, Cameron was credited for helping to modernise the Conservative Party and reducing the deficit. However, he was subject to a level of criticism for the 2015 manifesto commitment to implement the referendum on the UK's continued membership of the EU and his vocal support for remain, which ultimately led to his resignation as prime minister. This led to a sustained period of political instability. The austerity measures introduced by Cameron's chancellor George Osborne failed to reduce unemployment, lower interest rates and stimulate growth, and were linked to worsened inequality and poverty and a rise in political instability. In historical rankings of prime ministers, academics and journalists have ranked him in the third and fourth quintiles.

== Background ==
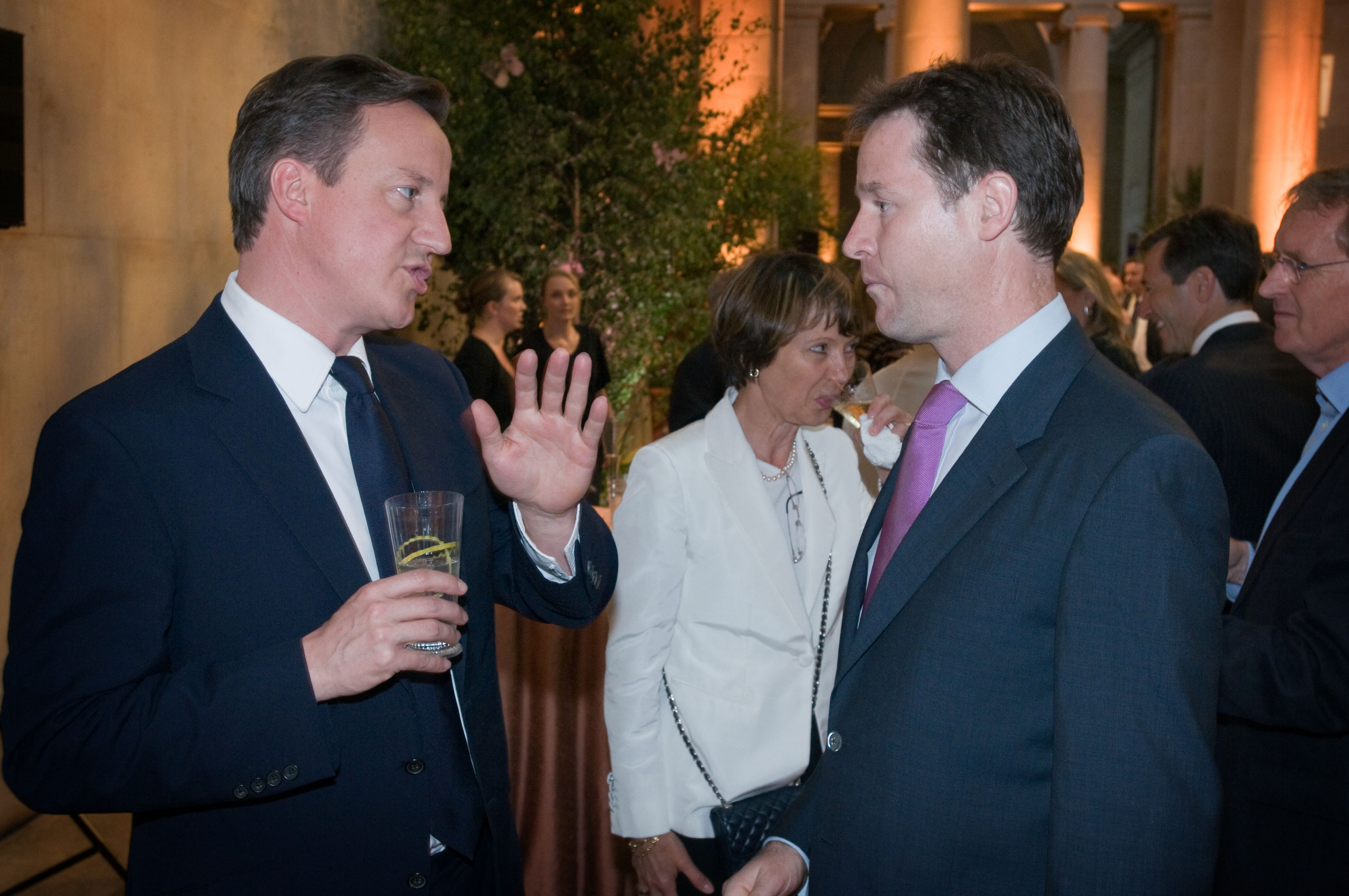
Cameron (left) formed a coalition with Liberal Democrat leader Nick Clegg (right) in May 2010

The morning after the 2010 general election presented the country with no single political party able to form a government that would command a majority in the House of Commons for the first time since the February 1974 general election with the Labour Party led by Harold Wilson falling short of a majority. In light of this reality the Conservative leader, David Cameron, went public and gave a "big, open and comprehensive offer" to the Liberal Democrats' leader Nick Clegg and said that he wanted to open up negotiations with them to form Britain's first coalition government since Winston Churchill's war ministry during the Second World War. In reply, Clegg said that he had always maintained that the party with the most seats and the most votes should have the right to seek to govern. Speaking to the press he said: "It seems this morning that it is the Conservative Party which has more votes and more seats – although not an absolute majority – which is why I now think that it is the Conservative Party which should seek to govern in the national interest."

Following the announcement, teams of negotiators from both parties formulated what would become the Coalition Agreement which would form the basis of their partnership together. Gordon Brown's resignation on 11 May 2010 meant that Cameron was invited by the Queen to form a government and a coalition with the Liberal Democrats was agreed, with Clegg as the Deputy PM and Lord President of the Council. The initial agreement was published on 12 May 2010. It consisted of a seven-page document, in 11 sections. In the foreword, it stated "These are the issues that needed to be resolved between us in order for us to work together as a strong and stable government". Of the 57 Liberal Democrat MPs, only two (Charles Kennedy and John Leech) refused to support the Conservative Coalition agreement.

== First term (May 2010 – May 2015) ==
=== Entering government ===
On 11 May 2010, following the resignation of Gordon Brown as prime minister and on his recommendation, Queen Elizabeth II invited Cameron to form a new government. At age 43, Cameron became the youngest prime minister since Lord Liverpool in 1812, beating the record previously set by Tony Blair in May 1997.

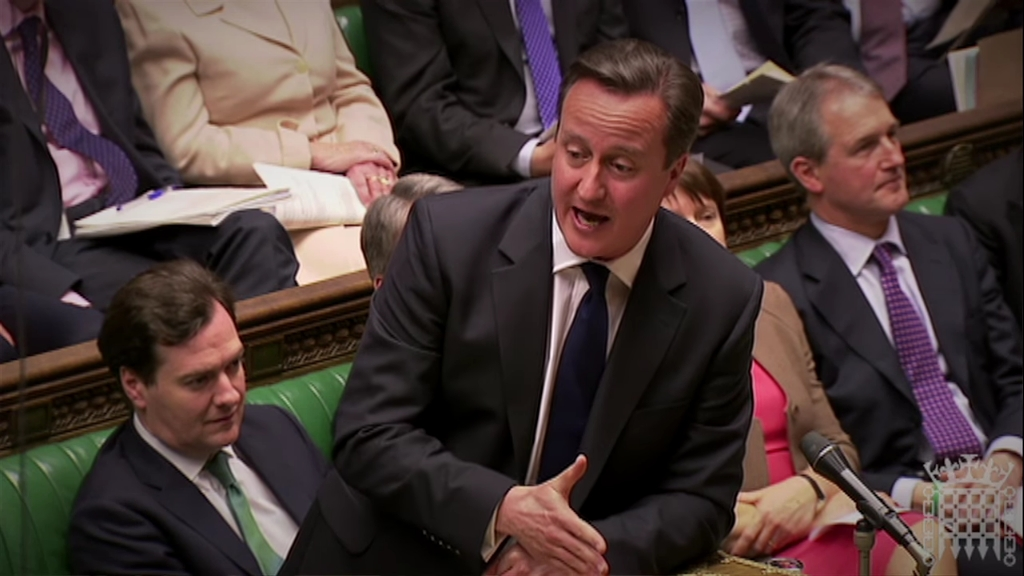
Cameron at Prime Minister's Questions in 2012

In his first address outside 10 Downing Street, he announced his intention to form a coalition government, the first since the Second World War, with the Liberal Democrats.

Cameron outlined how he intended to "put aside party differences and work hard for the common good and for the national interest." As one of his first moves Cameron appointed Nick Clegg, the leader of the Liberal Democrats, as deputy prime minister on 11 May 2010. Between them, the Conservatives and Liberal Democrats controlled 363 seats in the House of Commons, with a majority of 76 seats.

Cameron made his first official visits as prime minister in May. He first visited Scotland and met with the First Minister Alex Salmond, followed by Wales to meet with the First Minister Carwyn Jones, and Northern Ireland to meet with the First Minister Peter Robinson. His first trip to a foreign country was on 20 May to France where he met with the French president Nicolas Sarkozy. He visited Germany on 21 May where he held talks with Chancellor Angela Merkel.

=== Cabinet appointments ===
A press conference on the new cabinet took place on 12 May 2010. Soon after Cameron took office, it was confirmed that Clegg would be appointed to the semi-official role of deputy prime minister, while George Osborne would become the Chancellor of the Exchequer. Later it was confirmed that William Hague had assumed the post of Foreign Secretary and the new Home Secretary would be Theresa May. Cameron's cabinet included Clegg and four other Liberal Democrats: Danny Alexander, Vince Cable, Chris Huhne, and David Laws.

=== Policies ===
==== Economic issues and programme for austerity ====
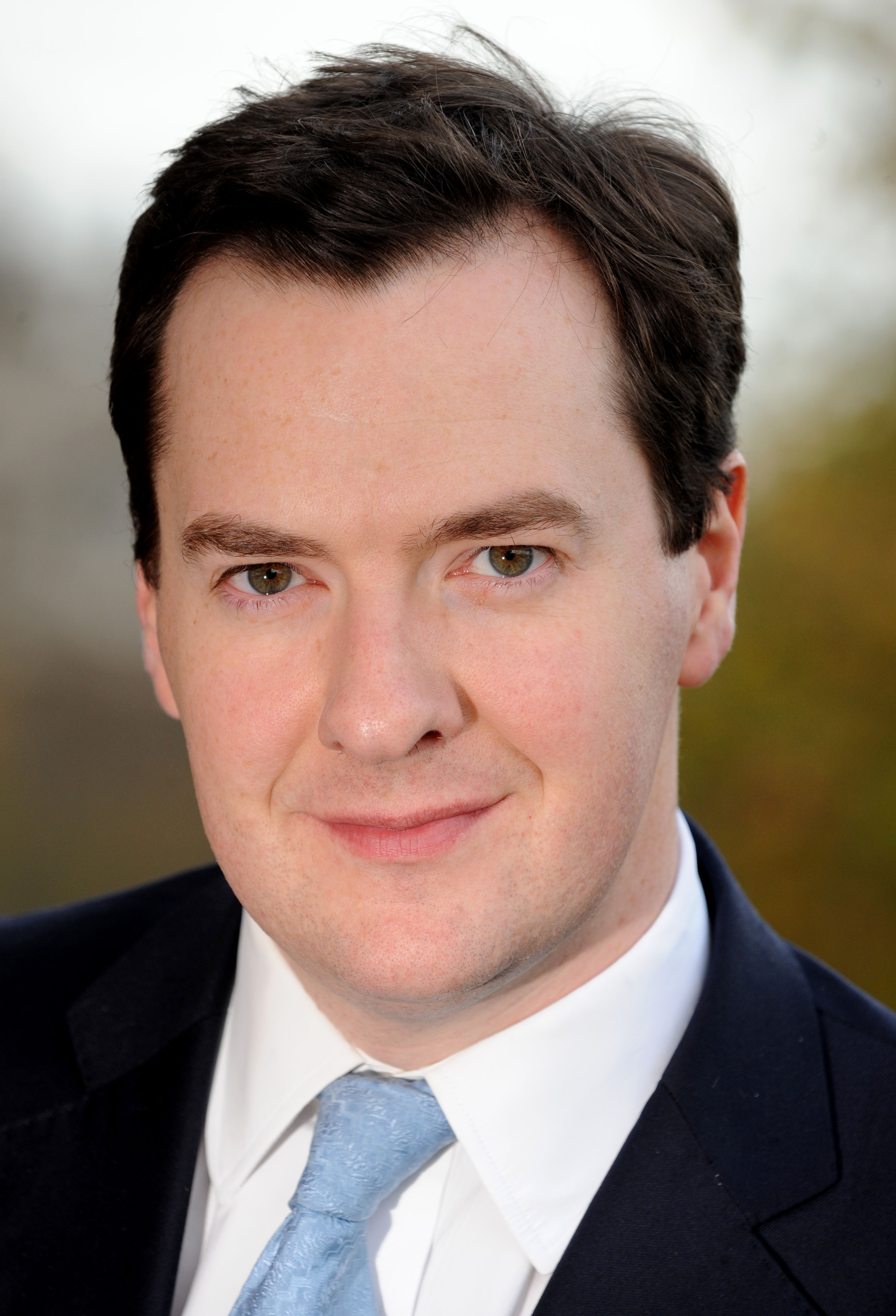
George Osborne (a close friend and ally to Cameron) served as Chancellor of the Exchequer under Cameron throughout Cameron's tenure as prime minister

The economy was a priority during the Great Recession and the consequent increasing government debt when Cameron came into office, with the topic being of much concern in British public opinion. The government announced a policy, later called 'Plan A', of eliminating the structural deficit and ensuring that the debt-to-GDP ratio started falling by the end of the parliament in 2015. To facilitate this goal, the Office for Budget Responsibility and a government-wide spending review were created. While several government agencies enacted spending decreases, funding policies for the National Health Service and for overseas development were exempt.

In 2010, the Behavioural Insights Team was set up to apply nudge theory (behavioural economics and psychology) to try to improve government policy and services as well as to save the UK government money. In February 2013, the UK lost its AAA credit rating, the retention of which the government had indicated to be a priority when coming to power, for the first time since 1978. By 2015 the annual deficit had been cut by about half, (the initial target was to get it to zero), so the debt-to-GDP ratio was still rising.

Specifically, Cameron's first term in office, enacting changes from 2010 to 2014, involved about £100 billion of cuts in government expenditures. In terms of economic growth, the figures that came in were generally below expectations at first, but nationwide growth picked up to an annual rate of 3% by the end of 2014, indicating a mixed picture as many of the new job positions being created have featured relatively low wages. Cameron's administration has also pursued a policy of tax increases; however, the bulk of the deficit reduction that occurred, more than 80% of the total, was related to spending cuts.

In 2014, Cameron stated that the austerity programme would continue into the next parliament with further cuts to be decided after the election. Cameron's government introduced a law to prevent raising Income Tax, National Insurance and VAT rates. Ameet Gill, aide to Cameron at the time claims this was "poorly thought out", done "on the hoof" and "probably the dumbest economic policy". Labour considered the policy unwise and claimed it would make ending the spending deficit harder. Conservatives claimed they were leaving people with more of their own money to spend.

==== Reforms to the benefits system ====
In 2010 a white paper was introduced by Iain Duncan Smith to reform the benefits system, merging six benefits into the Universal Credit. The objectives of the policy included creating a more responsive system that would simplify and incentive return to work, pay benefits in a monthly cycle more akin to salaries, reduce the high marginal deduction rate that accumulates from the withdrawal of more than one means-tested benefit simultaneously improving incentives, ensure that taking on even a small or varying amount of work would be financially rewarding, and reduce the proportion of children growing up in homes where no one worked. Universal Credit would merge out-of-work benefits and in-work support to improve return to work incentives. Implementation proved to be difficult and was much delayed, with the first roll out of the full system in December 2018, with full implementation targeted for 2024.

In 2015 the chancellor, George Osborne, announced a future £3.2 billion a year cut to the Universal Credit budget, to significant criticism about risks the system would fail to achieve its purpose of incentivising work in low-income households.

==== Reforms to the National Health Service ====
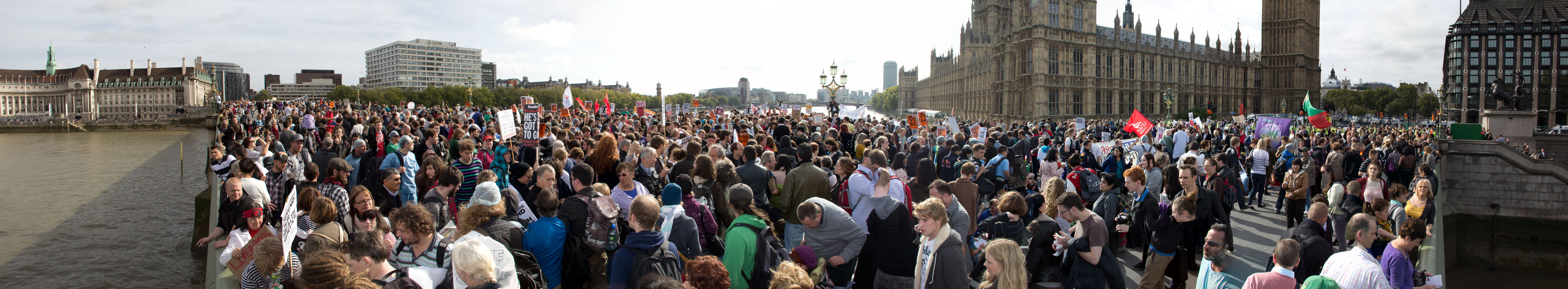
A panorama of the 'Block the Bridge' protest on Westminster Bridge, London.

The Health and Social Care Bill was the most deep-rooted and extensive reworking of the structure of the National Health Service ever undertaken. The bill had implications for all health organisations in the NHS, not least for primary care trusts (PCTs) and strategic health authorities (SHAs), which were replaced by clinical commissioning groups principally run by local GPs.

The bill was one of the government's most controversial proposals, and in April 2011 the government announced a "listening exercise" postponing further action on the bill. The controversy arose in part because the proposals were not discussed during the 2010 general election campaign and were not contained in the May 2010 Conservative–Liberal Democrat coalition agreement. Two months after the election, a white paper outlined what The Daily Telegraph called the "biggest revolution in the NHS since its foundation".

==== Arms sales ====
During the throes of the Arab Spring, for which he had voiced support, Cameron spent three days touring undemocratic Gulf states with eight of Britain's leading defence manufacturers. In response to the ensuing criticism, Cameron issued a three-point defence. Early in 2012, Cameron again visited the Middle East to "broaden and deepen" business ties with Saudi Arabia – Britain's leading arms export market – even after Amnesty International had several weeks earlier accused the Saudi government of unleashing a wave of repression against the repressed minority-Shia population in the east of the country, and even as Saudi troops added to the list of Shia protesters they had shot dead. The week before his Saudi visit, the Committees on Arms Export Controls published questions it had asked the Coalition regarding arms sales to Saudi Arabia, in particular querying why, when there was unrest in the country in 2011, licences for a range of equipment had not been revoked.

In 2014, after Israel's Operation Protective Edge, Cameron's government came under pressure to place an arms embargo on Israel. Vince Cable, whose department was ultimately responsible for such matters, issued a threat to suspend 12 export licences if violence escalated again. The threat was dismissed in Israel, and was described by one leading Israeli journalist as simply "an attempt at gesture politics to local voters".

==== NATO military intervention in Libya ====
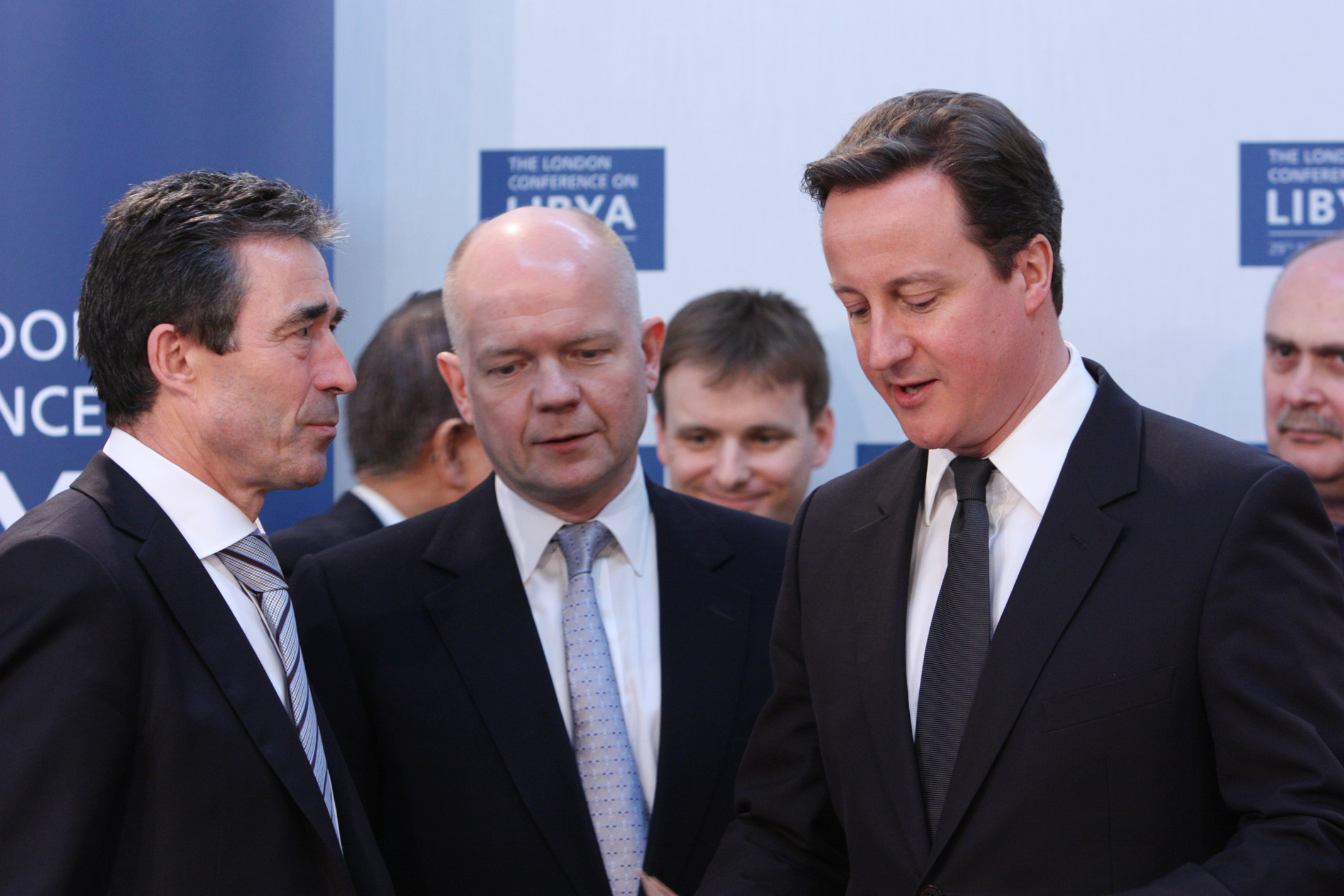
Cameron and Foreign Secretary William Hague speaking to NATO Secretary General Anders Fogh Rasmussen at the London Conference on Libya, 29 March 2011.

Libya–United Kingdom relations soured in 2011 with the outbreak of the Libyan Civil War. Cameron condemned the "appalling and unacceptable" violence used against anti-Gaddafi protesters. After weeks of lobbying by the UK and its allies, on 17 March 2011 the United Nations Security Council approved a no-fly zone to prevent government forces loyal to Muammar Gaddafi from carrying out air attacks on anti-Gaddafi rebels. Two days later the UK and the United States fired more than 110 Tomahawk missiles at targets in Libya.

Cameron has said he is "proud" of the role United Kingdom played in the overthrow of Gaddafi's government. Cameron also stated that UK had played a "very important role", adding that "a lot of people said that Tripoli was completely different to Benghazi and that the two don't get on—they were wrong. ... People who said 'this is all going to be an enormous swamp of Islamists and extremists'—they were wrong."

In March 2016, with two main rival factions based in Tripoli and Benghazi continuing to fight, an Independent editorial noted that "there can be no question that Libya is broken. There are three nominal governments, none of which holds much authority. The economy is flatlining. Refugees flood to the Mediterranean. And Isis has put down roots in Sirte and, increasingly, Tripoli." It was at this time that US president Barack Obama accused Cameron of allowing Libya to sink into a "mess", though in private the American leader bluntly describes post-intervention Libya as a "shit show".

In 2015 through 2016, the Foreign Affairs Select Committee conducted an extensive and highly critical inquiry into the British involvement in the civil war. It concluded that the early threat to civilians had been overstated and that the significant Islamist element in the rebel forces had not been recognised, due to an intelligence failure. By summer 2011 the initial limited intervention to protect Libyan civilians had become a policy of regime change. However that new policy did not include proper support and for a new government, leading to a political and economic collapse in Libya and the growth of ISIL in North Africa. It concluded that Cameron was ultimately responsible for this British policy failure.

==== Syria and the Middle East ====
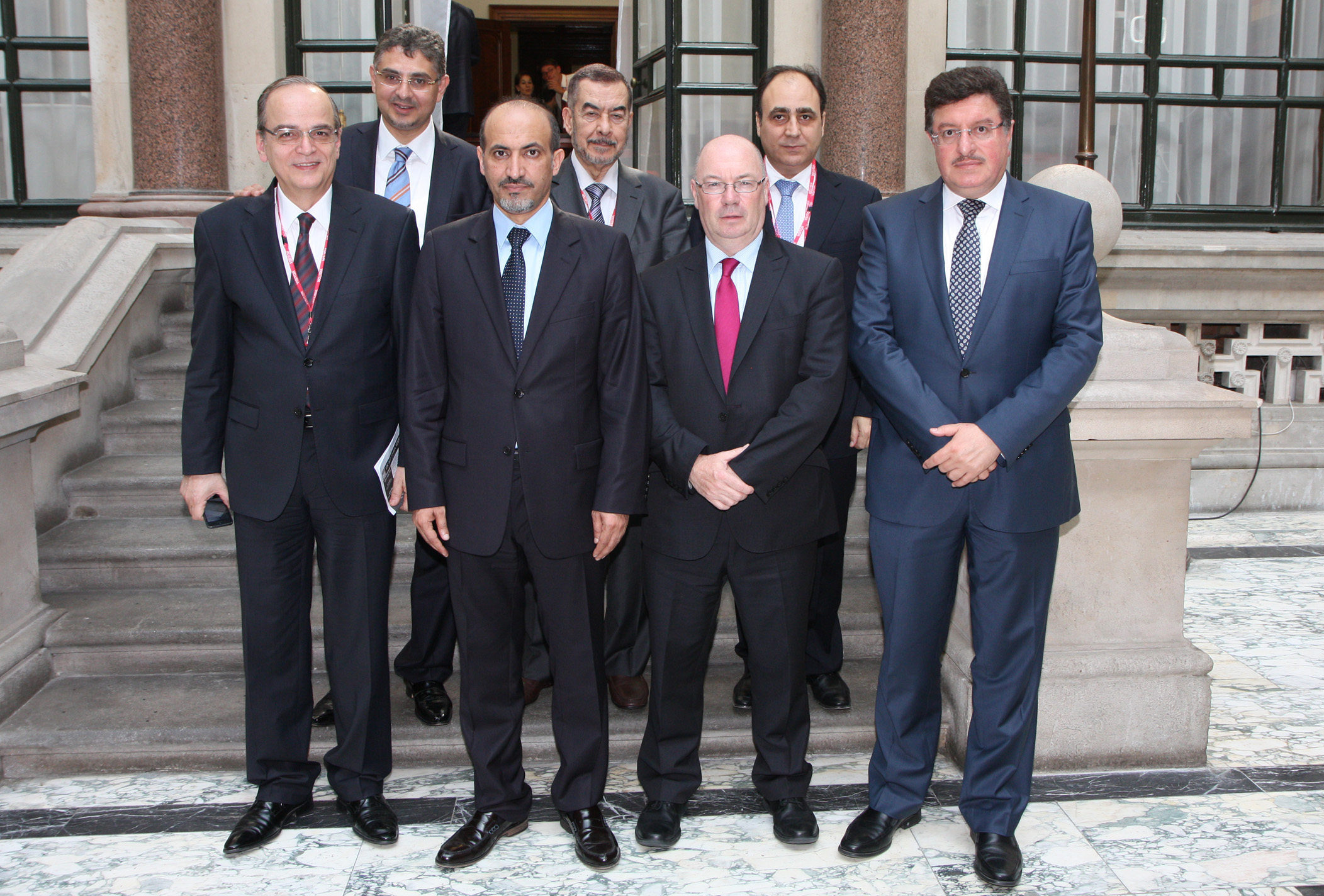
The Foreign Office minister overseeing Syrian foreign policy was Alistair Burt until 2013. He is pictured meeting with the National Coalition of Syrian Revolutionary and Opposition Forces

The government was critical of Bashar al-Assad's government in the 2011 Syrian uprisings stating it had "forfeited the right to lead" by "miring itself in the blood of innocent people", and backed the rebels. On 24 February 2012, the government recognised the Syrian National Council as a "legitimate representative" of the country. On 20 November 2012, the National Coalition of Syrian Revolutionary and Opposition Forces was recognised as the "sole legitimate representative" of the Syrian people, and a credible alternative to the Syrian government.

On 21 August 2013, immediately following a chemical-weapons attack at Ghouta, Cameron urged U.S. president Barack Obama to respond with a military intervention. However a motion to participate in military strikes against the Syrian government was defeated in parliament on 29 August 2013. This was the first time that a British government was blocked from taking a military action by parliament. After the vote Cameron said that he "strongly [believed] in the need for a tough response to the use of chemical weapons but I also believe in respecting the will of this House of Commons ... It is clear to me that the British Parliament, reflecting the views of the British people, does not want to see British military action. I get that and the Government will act accordingly."

Ultimately a negotiated agreement was reached to eliminate Syria's chemical weapons.

==== Referendum on Scottish independence ====
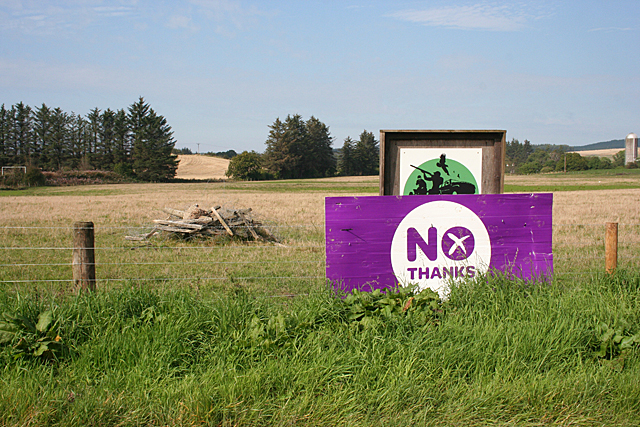
Cameron campaigned successfully for the Better Together campaign in the referendum on Scottish independence

A victory by the Scottish National Party in the 2011 Scottish general election raised the prospect of the Scottish Government holding an independence referendum within the following five years. Though the constitution is reserved to Westminster, the SNP planned to get round that by holding a referendum to seek a mandate to negotiate for independence. The UK government agreed to this plan. In October 2012 Cameron said that the campaign to keep Scotland within the United Kingdom was a priority for the government.

==== Delayed payment of EU dues ====
In November 2014, Cameron stated that the UK would not pay its EU dues. George Osborne later claimed victory on the dispute, noting that the UK wouldn't have to pay additional interest on the payments, which would be delayed until after Britain's 7 May 2015 general election.

==== Transport ====
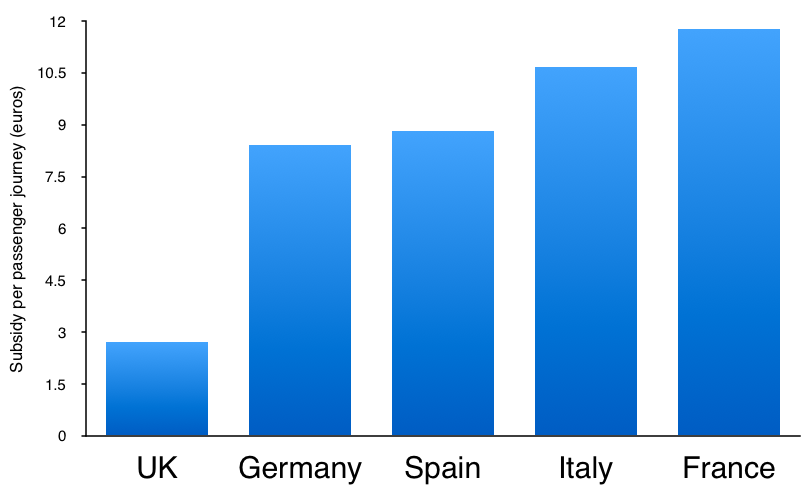
Subsidy per rail passenger journey for the five biggest EU economies

Following the 2010 general election, the new Conservative-led Coalition continued Labour's policies on rail transport largely unaltered after a pause to review the finances, keeping the privatised system in place. There was continuing support for the High Speed 2 scheme and further developing plans for the route. Whilst initially showing scepticism towards the electrification of the Great Western route, they later gave the project its backing and work began formally in 2012, with the electrification being completed in 2020. Other projects include Crossrail and the upgrade to Thameslink were completed in 2022 and 2020 respectively.

The Government has moved towards allowing more competition on the intercity network through open access operators. In 2015 it approved a service run by Alliance Rail to operate between London and Blackpool, and both Alliance and FirstGroup have applied to run open access services on the East Coast Main Line.

In January 2015, Cameron said "We've made sure that rail fares cannot go up by more than inflation. So the rail fare increase this year, as last year, is linked to inflation, and I think that's right. In previous years it's gone up by more than inflation. But, of course, what you're seeing on our railways is a £38bn investment project. And that money is coming, of course, from taxpayers, from the government, and from farepayers as well." He said Britain was seeing "the biggest investment in our roads since the 1970s, but in our railways since Victorian times".

==== Food banks ====
The rapid growth in the use of food banks under David Cameron became one of the major criticisms of his administration, and a recurring theme at Prime Minister's Questions. Cameron praised volunteers providing donated food as "part of what I call the Big Society", to which Labour leader Ed Miliband responded that he "never thought the Big Society was about feeding hungry children in Britain".

In February 2014, 27 Anglican bishops together with leading Methodists and Quakers wrote an open letter to Cameron blaming government policy for a rise in the use of food banks. The letter asserted that "over half of people using food banks have been put in that situation by cutbacks to and failures in the benefit system, whether it be payment delays or punitive sanctions". The government responded that delays in benefit processing had been reduced, with the proportion of benefits paid on time rising from 88 to 89% under Labour, to 96–97% in 2014. Cameron said that the rise in food bank usage was due to the government encouraging Jobcentres and local authorities to promote them, and noted an OECD report which showed a fall in the proportion of people in Britain struggling to buy food.

=== Scandals ===
In November 2011, Home Secretary Theresa May came under heavy criticism for presiding over a scheme weakening UK border controls, and allowing potential terrorists into the country unchecked. Some of the blame also fell on (now former) Head of the UK border force Brodie Clark, whom May claimed went beyond his remit.

Lib Dem Business Secretary Vince Cable was removed from a quasi-judicial role in deciding whether BSkyB should be allowed to take over control of Sky, after being accused of bias against News Corporation, the company which owns BSkyB.

Allegations of Islamophobia were made against the Conservative Party during Cameron's premiership. One of the first major Conservative Party policies considered to be Islamophobic since they came to power in 2010 were the "Go Home" vans, an initiative of then-Home Secretary Theresa May. They were part of a controversial 2013 advertising campaign by the British Home Office, in which advertising vans with slogans recommending that illegal immigrants should "go home or face arrest" were sent to tour areas with high immigrant populations, particularly of British Muslims. The "Go Home" vans were a part of May's larger Home Office hostile environment policy, a controversial program designed to make staying in the United Kingdom as difficult as possible for people without leave to remain. The United Nations Human Rights Council has stated that the policy has fostered xenophobia within the UK, while the Equality and Human Rights Commission has found that the policy broke equalities law.

In 2016, the Conservative Party faced criticism for running a supposedly Islamophobic campaign promoting Zac Goldsmith for London mayor by smearing Labour's mayoral candidate, Sadiq Khan. Concerns were first raised that Goldsmith's campaign was attempting to divide communities after flyers targeting Hindu voters suggested Khan would implement a tax on jewellery. Another controversy arose when Goldsmith questioned Khan's associations with alleged extremists before he became an MP.

==== News of the World phone hacking scandal ====
Cameron's close relationship with senior figures of News International came under increasing scrutiny as the controversy of the News of the World phone hacking scandal grew. A close friend of Rebekah Brooks, Cameron had also hired Andy Coulson as his communications director before Coulson was implicated in, and later arrested for his role in, the phone hacking. Cameron, who had spent his Christmas with Brooks, was accused by Ed Miliband of being "out of step with public opinion" and lacking leadership on the matter due to his "close relationships" with News International. The scandal was further aggravated by the announcement he had ridden Rebekah Brooks horse on loan from the Metropolitan Police, and the implicit involvement of Culture Secretary Jeremy Hunt, whom had been handed jurisdiction over Rupert Murdoch's BSkyB bid following Vince Cable's supposed expression of bias, in passing confidential information to the Murdoch empire regarding the bid's progress Right-leaning political commentator Peter Oborne argued that it was no longer possible to assert that Cameron was "grounded with a decent set of values" after a "succession of chronic personal misjudgements", equating the scandal with Tony Blair's decision to go to war in Iraq as a turning point in his premiership, and calling for him to distance himself from Brooks.

=== Effect of the Coalition on Cameron's Premiership ===
The Prime Ministerial Thesis of Government suggests that there is too much power given to the prime minister. Due to the unwritten constitution of the UK, there is little constraint on the power of the prime minister. However, during the 2010-2015 coalition, this theory was tested as it showed that there are limits to the power of the prime minister. As a result of the coalition, Cameron used half of his cabinet slots to make room for Clegg as his deputy prime minister, and other Liberal Democrats as ministers. In which they suggest that Cameron's power as prime minister was severely limited during the coalition:

"hamstrung by a coalition partner which has more veto power than a party of its size and standing really should have, sometimes beset by Tory critics, Cameron has not proved to be the dominant prime minister he may have appeared earlier in his premiership."

Bennister and Heffernan argue that Cameron's leadership style differs to that of Thatcher and Blair, as a result of the coalition. Thatcher and Blair both presented a presidential style of leadership during their premierships (presidentialism.) Cameron was not able to demonstrate this type of power, as he often 'accepted the veto' that was presented to him by the Liberal Democrats. He was often restrained by the fact he continually had to compromise with a party that was ideologically set to the left of his own. Anthony Seldon and Mike Finn support the argument that the coalition severely effect Cameron's power as prime minister as they suggest that "The lack of an overall Conservative majority in Parliament and the requirement to work with the Liberal Democrats were constraints that no post-war Prime Minister of any party has had to face for any extended duration." Seldon and Finn reflect on what Cameron could have achieved had he not been in a coalition; "He would have had more freedom of manoeuvre on Europe. He would have gone further on welfare reform and on spending cuts. He would have insisted on more value for money from the green agenda, and pushed the 'Big Society' agenda harder. He would have focused less on civil liberties and more on the need for tough national security. Above all, the boundary changes would almost certainly have been implemented."

=== 2015 general election ===
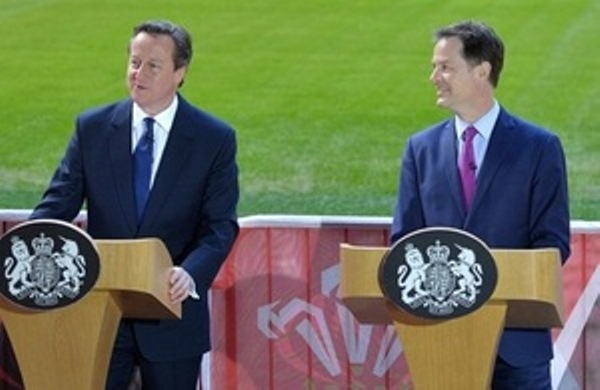
Cameron with Clegg in 2015

On 7 May 2015, Cameron was re-elected UK prime minister with a majority in the Commons. The Conservative Party's decisive victory in the general election was a surprise, as most polls and commentators had suggested the outcome was too close to call and that the result would be a second hung parliament. Cameron said of his first term when returned as prime minister for a second term that he was "proud to lead the first coalition government in 70 years" and offered particular thanks to Clegg for his role in it. Forming the first Conservative majority government since 1992, David Cameron became the first prime minister to be re-elected immediately after a full term with a larger popular vote share since Lord Salisbury at the 1900 general election.

In response to the November 2015 Paris attacks, Cameron secured the support of the House of Commons to extend air strikes against ISIS into Syria. Earlier that year, Cameron had outlined a five-year strategy to counter Islamist extremism and subversive teachings.

== Second term (May 2015 – July 2016) ==
=== Appointments ===
Following the 2015 general election, Cameron remained prime minister, this time at the head of a Conservative-only government with a majority of 12 seats. Having gained seats from Labour and the Liberal Democrats, Cameron was able to form a government without a coalition partner, resulting in the first Conservative-only cabinet since 1997.

=== 2015 Summer Budget ===
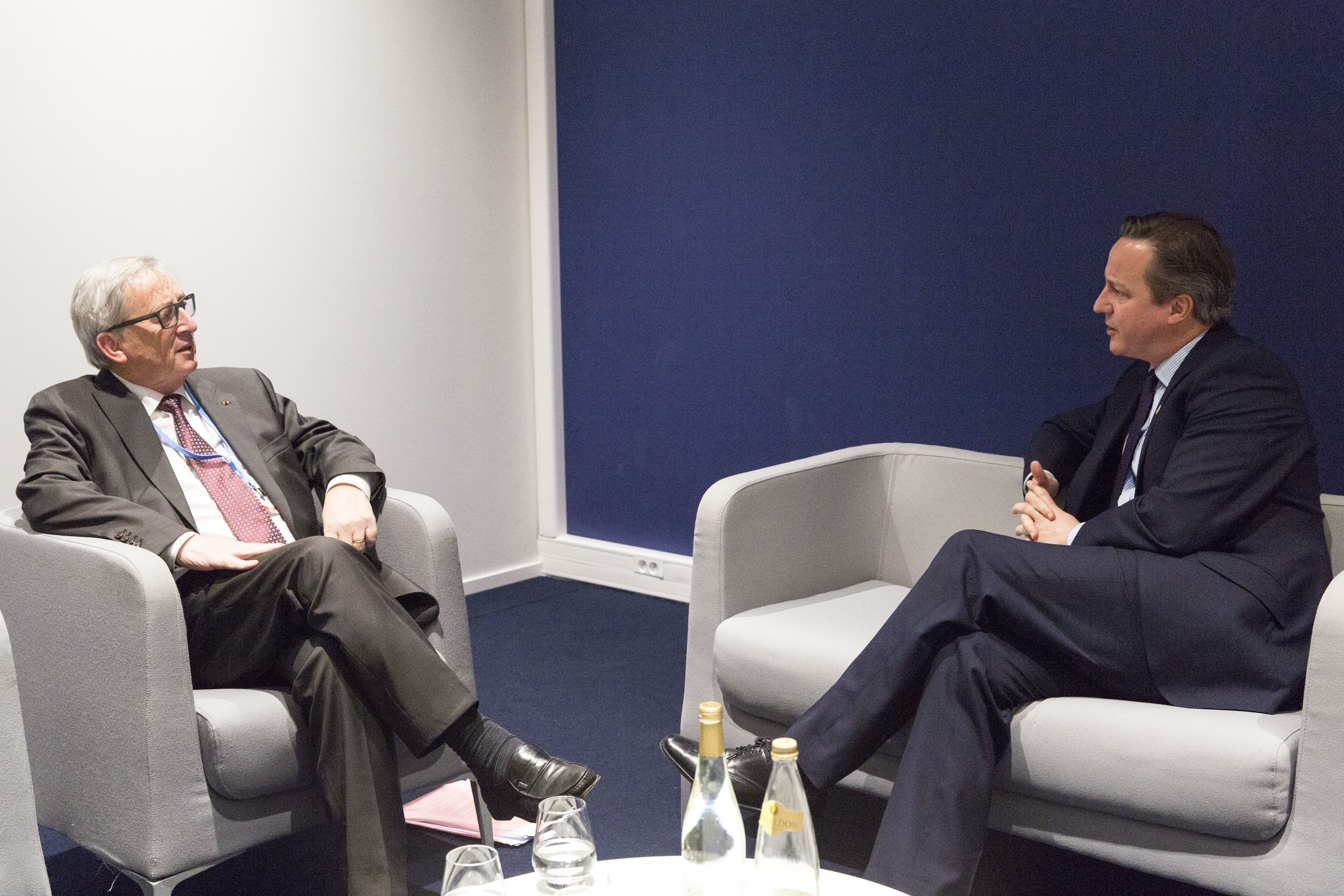
Cameron meets with President of the European Commission Jean-Claude Juncker, November 2015

Following the election victory Chancellor George Osborne announced that there would be a second 2015 budget on 8 July. The main announcements included:

- A "National Living Wage" for those over 25, of £9/hour by 2020
- The tax-free personal allowance for Income Tax was raised to £11,000 from £10,600
- Defence spending was protected at 2% of GDP for the duration of the Parliament
- Welfare reform, including lowering the benefits cap to £20,000 for those outside London and limiting child tax credit to the first two children
- An increase in the inheritance tax threshold, meaning that a married couple will be able to pass on £1 million tax-free
- A reduction in the amount individuals earning over £150,000 could pay into their pension tax-free
- An increase in free childcare from 15 hours/week to 30 hours/week for working families with 3- and 4-year-olds
- An £800 increase in the amount of maintenance loan paid out to poorer students, paid for by replacing maintenance grants with loans
- Measures to introduce tax incentives for large corporations to create apprenticeships, aiming for 3 million new apprenticeships by 2020.

==== Syria and counter terrorism ====
In response to the November 2015 Paris attacks, Cameron secured the support of the House of Commons to extend air strikes against ISIS into Syria. Earlier that year, Cameron had outlined a five-year strategy to counter Islamist extremism and subversive teachings.

==== Criticism of use of statutory instruments ====
In January 2016, The Independent reported that there had been an increase of over 50% in the use of statutory instruments, used to pass legislation without Parliamentary scrutiny since 2010. Lord Jopling deplored the behaviour which he called an abuse whilst The Baroness Smith of Basildon asked whether it was the start of "constitutional gerrymandering".

=== Referendum on the European Union and resignation ===
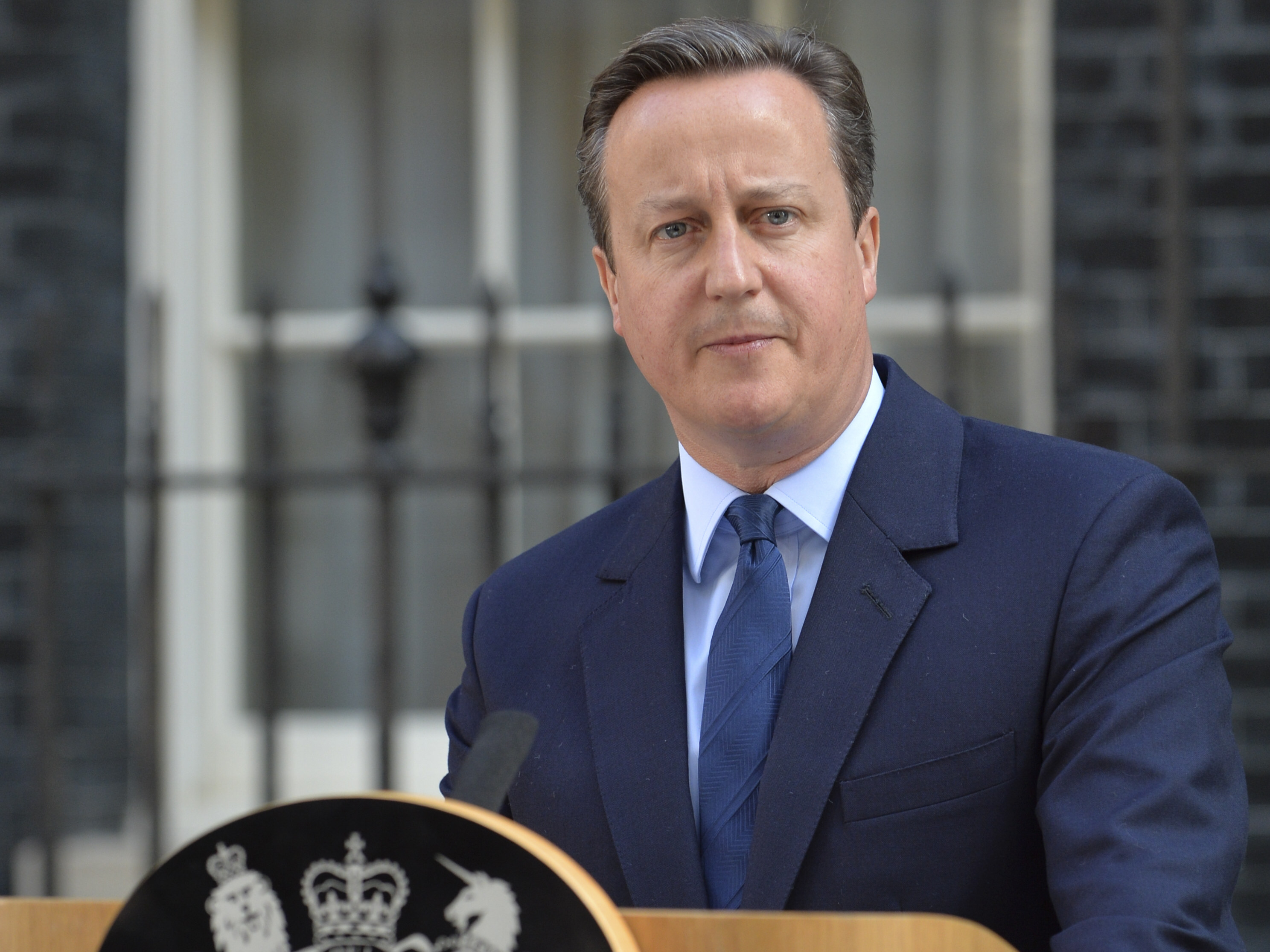
Cameron announcing his resignation outside 10 Downing Street on 24 June 2016 following the UK vote to leave EU membership; he left office on 13 July.

As promised in the election manifesto, Cameron set a date for a referendum on whether the UK should remain a member of the European Union, and announced that he would be campaigning for Britain to remain within a "reformed EU". The terms of the UK's membership of the EU were re-negotiated, with agreement reached in February 2016. The option to leave came to be known as Brexit (a portmanteau of "Britain" and "exit").

The referendum was held on 23 June 2016. The result was approximately 52% in favour of leaving the European Union and 48% against, with a turnout of 72%. On 24 June, a few hours after the results became known, Cameron announced that he would resign the office of prime minister by the start of the Conservative Party Conference in October 2016. In a speech the next day outside 10 Downing Street, he stated that, on account of his own advocacy on behalf of remaining in the EU: "I do not think it would be right for me to try to be the captain that steers our country to its next destination."

There was some strong criticism made of Cameron and his government following the referendum. Matthew Norman, in an opinion piece in The Independent, called the referendum an act of "indescribably selfish recklessness." In late July, Parliament's Foreign Affairs Select Committee was told that Cameron had refused to allow the Civil Service to make plans for Brexit, a decision the committee described as "an act of gross negligence." His farewell speech as he left No. 10 accompanied by his family stressed the value of selfless public service.

The Conservative Party leadership election was scheduled for 9 September and the new leader was expected to be in place by the autumn conference, set to begin on 2 October. On 11 July, following the withdrawal of Andrea Leadsom from the Conservative Party leadership election and the confirmation of Theresa May as the new leader of the Conservative Party, Cameron announced he would hold a final cabinet meeting on 12 July and then, following a final Prime Minister's Questions, submit his resignation to the Queen on the afternoon of 13 July. After his final Prime Minister's Questions, Cameron received a standing ovation from MPs; his final comment was, "I was the future once"—a reference to his 2005 quip to Tony Blair, "he was the future once". Cameron then submitted his resignation to the Queen later that day.

Although no longer serving as prime minister, Cameron originally stated that he would continue inside Parliament, on the Conservative backbenches. On 12 September, however, he announced that he was resigning his seat with immediate effect, and was appointed to the Manor of Northstead. He was succeeded as MP for Witney by fellow Conservative Robert Courts. The Washington Post described him as having "sped away without glancing back" once Theresa May had "vaulted herself out of the hurricane-strength political wreckage of Britain's vote to leave the European Union."

== International prime ministerial trips ==
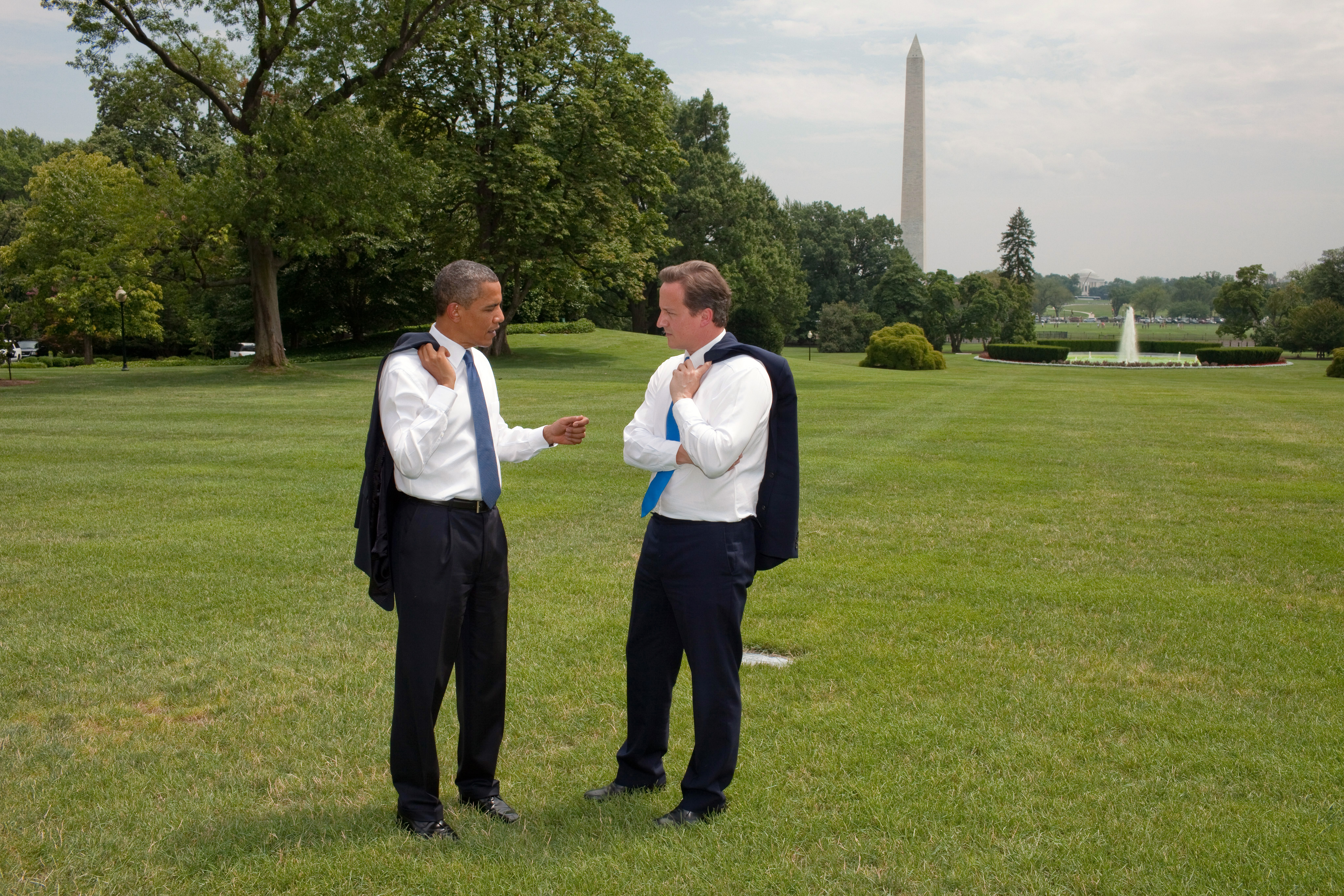
Cameron meets with U.S. president Barack Obama on the South Lawn of the White House, 20 July 2010.

Cameron made 148 international trips to 62 countries (in addition to visiting the Occupied Palestinian Territories) during his premiership. The number of visits per country:

- One visit to Algeria, Austria, Brazil, Bulgaria, Denmark, Egypt, Finland, Grenada, Hungary, Iceland, Ireland, Israel, Jamaica, Kazakhstan, Kuwait, Lebanon, Liberia, Lithuania, Luxembourg, Mexico, Myanmar, Nigeria, Norway, Oman, Qatar, Romania, Slovakia, Slovenia, South Korea, Sri Lanka, and Vietnam
- Two visits to Australia, Canada, China, Indonesia, Japan, Jordan, Latvia, Libya, Malaysia, Malta, Pakistan, Portugal, Singapore, South Africa, Spain, and Sweden
- Three visits to the Czech Republic, India, the Netherlands, Russia, Saudi Arabia, Turkey, and the United Arab Emirates
- Five visits to Italy and Poland
- Six visits to Switzerland
- Nine visits to Afghanistan
- Ten visits to the United States
- Twelve visits to Germany
- Eighteen visits to France
- Fifty visits to Belgium

== See also ==
- 2010s in United Kingdom political history
- Anti-austerity movement
- Politics of the United Kingdom
- David Cameron as Foreign Secretary

British premierships
Preceded by Brown	Cameron premiership 2010–2016	Succeeded by May
