= Protective custody =

Type of imprisonment (or care)

Protective custody (PC) is a type of imprisonment (or care) to protect a person from harm, either from outside sources or other prisoners. Many prison administrators believe the level of violence, or the underlying threat of violence within prisons, is a chief factor causing the need for PC units. Prisoners have the opportunity to request protective custody if they get the impression that the environment they are living in is harmful to their well being. Their request may be granted if the officials rule that the prisoner is truly at risk. Protective custody might simply involve putting the person in a secure prison (if the threat is from the outside), but usually protective custody involves some degree of segregation or solitary confinement. For people who are threatened because of their association with a certain group or gang, moving them to another section of the prison may be sufficient.

Throughout modern history, the term "protective custody" has sometimes been used as a euphemism for extrajudicial punishment. Most notably in Nazi Germany, where protective custody (Schutzhaft) was used as a quasi-legal cover for the elimination of political opposition and ethnic cleansing. Far from offering protection to the detainees, it was a central tool of repression designed to protect the Nazi regime from those it deemed "enemies of the state." Many inmates at Dachau, the first Nazi concentration camp, were falsely publicly said to be in "protective custody" -- a notable example being journalist Fritz Gerlich.

== History of units ==
=== United States ===
Early uses of protective custody started in the 1960s by law enforcement but it was used infrequently. US federal prosecution of organized crime figures led to the offering of witness protection to key government informers. In 1964 Joseph Valachi became the first La Cosa Nostra member to publicly testify to the existence of the organized crime group, appearing before a congressional committee. Valachi, who was facing the death penalty, agreed to testify in return for personal protection. He was held in solitary confinement for protection and given $15 (equivalent to $156 in 2025) a month.

Since the 1970s the Federal Witness Security Program has grown in size. The program is used to fight organized crime, terrorism, gang-related crime, and narcotics trafficking. In 1995, 141 new participants added to the program, increasing the number to 6,580 witnesses and 14,845 total participants since the program began. Also in 1995, 257 protected witnesses testified at trials against organized crime members, resulting in a substantial number of convictions.

In return for assistance from these participants, the witness and family members over 18 years of age must each sign a memorandum of agreement. The witness must agree to testify and provide information to law enforcement officials. In addition, the person must agree not to commit any crime and to take all necessary steps to avoid detection. Most witnesses remain in the program for two years..

Witness protection programs also exist in prisons. To protect witnesses serving a prison sentence, the federal government has created witness protection units within federal prisons. Protected witnesses live a more comfortable life than other prisoners, which includes having free and unlimited access to telephone and cable television and the ability to use their own money to buy food, appliances, jewelry, and other items.

In a prison context, protective custody is used mainly in the following cases:

- Those who are at high risk of being harmed or killed by other prisoners either for their crime or their group (ethnic or otherwise), such as pedophiles, child murderers / child abusers, rapists, men who commit violence against women, people who have committed hate crimes, people who have committed crimes against the elderly, animals, disabled people, the poor and the less fortunate, informants, gang members in a prison containing rival gang members or those who choose to "debrief" (provide information on their gang), or prisoners who are gay or transgender.
- Offenders with notorious criminal activities on the outside who may not be prison-wise or who may be subject to pressure because of their notoriety.
- Those criminals who are themselves witnesses to a crime, and might be harmed by other prisoners to either prevent them from speaking out, or for revenge.
- Inmates nearing expiration of their sentences who are trying to avoid disciplinary infractions or other problems.
- Corrupt public servants, including police officers, civil servants, people convicted of spying, doctors, council officers, etc.
- Celebrities convicted of serious offences.

Visiting:

- Space for family and attorney visits must be provided for PC cases, either in the PC unit or in the general population visiting room.
- An inmate search area and separate inmate entry route should be incorporated into the unit design to ensure the safety of other inmates and visitors.

Education, healthcare, laundry, and commissary:

- Libraries should be provided for inmates to read, study, and research their interests.

=== United Kingdom (England and Wales) ===
In England and Wales, the Prison Rules 1999 provide for segregation of inmates. Prisoners can be housed in a segregation unit (also called a care and separation unit) or, less commonly, in a close supervision centre (CSC; first introduced in 1998) for reasons including: to maintain good order, to discipline or for the prisoner's own protection; when awaiting an adjudication hearing pending a prison governor's first enquiry; and when found guilty of an offence against prison discipline. In 2015, there was there 1586 segregation places and 54 CSC places in the prison system in England and Wales. In 2014, around 10% of the prison population spent at least one night in segregated accommodation. In 2021, 52 CSC places were in use.

== Other usages ==
Protective custody does not necessarily imply that the person is a prisoner or in a prison setting. In some usages, it might simply involve placing a person in a secure setting, with no implication of imprisonment, such as when a child is placed in temporary foster care. In some cases, non-criminals (or defendants in pending trials) have also been placed in protective custody in a prison setting, for example to protect them from being lynched.
