= José Antonio Rodríguez Vega =

Spanish serial killer

- Born: José Antonio Rodríguez Vega; 3 December 1957; Santander, Spain
- Died: 24 October 2002 (aged 44); Topas, Spain
- Cause of death: Stab wounds
- Other name: The Old Lady Killer
- Conviction: Murder (16 counts)
- Penalty: 440 years imprisonment

Details
- Victims: 16 known and confirmed
- Span of crimes: 1987–1988
- Country: Spain
- State: Cantabria
- Date apprehended: 19 May 1988

José Antonio Rodríguez Vega (3 December 1957 – 24 October 2002), nicknamed El Mataviejas (The Old Lady Killer), was a Spanish serial killer who raped and killed at least 16 elderly women, ranging in age from 61 to 93 years old, in and around Santander, Cantabria, between August 1987 and April 1988.

== Biography ==
Rodríguez Vega was born in Santander, Cantabria, Spain. Rodríguez Vega hated his mother because she had thrown him out of the house when Rodríguez Vega beat his father, who was terminally ill. His behaviour while in prison, and his ability to charm his victims into forgiving him led to a reduction in his sentence to 8 years. Released in 1986, Rodríguez Vega's wife left him. He did not take the breakup well, but eventually remarried, this time to a mentally disabled woman, who he tortured and humiliated, all while keeping up the pretence of having an excellent marriage. He was considered to be a good person, a hardworking man and a good husband to those around him.

On 19 May 1988, Rodríguez Vega was arrested. After that, he confessed to the murders.

== Trial and sentence ==
His trial began in November 1991 in Santander. He was convicted for murdering 16 women and eventually sentenced 440 years in prison.

Rodríguez Vega was diagnosed as a psychopath who was a fastidiously neat individual. His killing was well organized in that he would first identify a victim, and then observe her until he was familiar with every aspect of her routine. He would then make contact with the victim, try to gain her trust, using his charm and looks, until he gained access to her home, often under the guise of doing work to or around her home. He was described as a cold-hearted and calculating serial killer who took mementoes from each of his kills. When he was arrested, police found a red room where he displayed his mementoes, which ranged from a television to a bouquet of plastic flowers. Because of the age of his victims, some of their deaths were attributed to natural causes. The extent of his killing spree was not realized until police released a videotape of his home, showing his mementoes. Families of the victims identified objects that linked Rodríguez Vega to their dead relatives.

== Death ==
On 22 October 2002, Rodríguez Vega was transferred to a FIES jail module for dangerous inmates; there has been some controversy about the possible reasons for this, given that he had been a model prisoner during his sentence and he was just a few years away from being released.

His lack of remorse while discussing his crimes with fellow inmates Enrique del Valle (‘El Zanahorio’) and Daniel Rodríguez Obelleiro, as well as Rodríguez Vega's reputation as a rapist and a jail snitch, sealed his fate within the first 24 hours of his stay in the FIES module.

On 24 October 2002, Rodríguez Vega was walking in the prison common grounds when del Valle and Obelleiro attacked and brutally stabbed him 113 times as prison guards watched without intervening. Rodríguez Vega was buried the next day in a poor coffin. The burial was attended by only two gravediggers.

== See also ==
- List of serial killers by country
- List of serial killers by number of victims
