= Article 41-bis prison regime =

Italian legal instrument

In Italian law, Article 41-bis of the Prison Administration Act, also known as carcere duro ("hard prison regime"), is a provision that allows the minister of justice or the minister of the interior to suspend certain prison regulations and impose practically complete isolation upon a prisoner. It is used against people imprisoned for particular crimes, such as Mafia-type association under 416-bis (Associazione di tipo mafioso), drug trafficking, homicide, aggravated robbery and extortion, kidnapping, terrorism, and attempting to subvert the constitutional system. It is suspended only when a prisoner co-operates with the authorities, when a court annuls it, or when a prisoner dies.

The Surveillance Court of Rome is the court competent on nationwide level on appeals against the 41-bis decree. The European Court of Human Rights found in 2007 that the regime breached two articles of the European Convention on Human Rights. Earlier in 2002, 300 Mafia prisoners declared a hunger strike. In 2022, Alfredo Cospito, an Italian anarchist, began a hunger strike, which generated mainstream media attention on the 41-bis.

== Restrictive measures ==
The system was essentially intended to cut inmates off completely from their original milieu and to separate them from their former criminal associates. Measures normally include bans on: the use of the telephone; all association or correspondence with other prisoners; meetings with third parties; receiving or sending sums of money over a set amount; receiving parcels (other than those containing linen) from the outside; organising cultural, recreational or sporting activities; voting or standing in elections for prisoner representatives; and taking part in arts-and-crafts activities, etc., as well as restrictions on visits from members of the family (once per month and visitors are only allowed to communicate by intercom through thick glass).

== History ==
Article 41-bis was introduced in 1975 (Prison Administration Act, Law no. 354 of 26 July 1975) as an emergency measure to deal with prison unrest and revolts during the Years of Lead (Italian: Anni di piombo), characterized by widespread social conflicts and terrorism acts carried out by extra-parliamentary movements. In February 1991, the then Italian Ministry of Interior Vincenzo Scotti referred to the Ministry of Grace and Justice Claudio Martelli 23 exponents of the mafia would be released and enabled to return to their affairs in Palermo. To prevent that risk, the Italian government met during the night and approved a restrictive authentic interpretation of the norm.

On 8 June 1992, after the killing on 23 May of judge Giovanni Falcone by the Corleonesi of the Sicilian Mafia in the Capaci bombing, the regime was modified (confirmed in Law no. 356 of 7 August 1992). The new article stipulated that restrictive measures could be implemented when there was "serious concern over the maintenance of order and security." The aim was to prevent association, and therefore the exchange of messages, between Mafia prisoners and to break the chain of command between Mafia bosses and their subordinates. Following the killing of Falcone's colleague Paolo Borsellino in the via D'Amelio bombing on 19 July 1992, 400 imprisoned Mafia bosses were transferred by helicopter and military transport aircraft from Palermo’s Ucciardone prison to top-security prisons on the mainland at Ascoli Piceno and Cuneo, and to the island prisons of Pianosa and Asinara, where the severity of the 41-bis regime was accentuated by geographical remoteness. After Mafia boss Salvatore Riina was captured in January 1993, numerous terror attacks were ordered as warning to its members to not turn state's witness, but also in response for the overruling of 41-bis system.

Over the years, the 41-bis system has gradually been relaxed, in response to domestic court decisions or the European Committee for the Prevention of Torture (CPT) recommendations to ensure appropriate contacts and activities for prisoners subject to that regime. When first implemented, section 41-bis also empowered the Minister of Justice to censor all of a prisoner’s correspondence, including that with lawyers and organs of the European Convention on Human Rights (ECHR). The Court affirmed that under the exceptional regime of art. 41-bis there is an unlawful interference with the right to correspondence ex art. 8 of ECHR, since restrictions to constitutional rights can be determined only by means of a reasoned judicial decision and never by means of a Ministerial Decree. In 2002, the measure became a permanent fixture in the penal code. Amnesty International has expressed concern that the 41 bis regime could in some circumstances amount to "cruel, inhumane or degrading treatment" for prisoners.

Luigi Manconi, senator and president of the Human Rights Commission, criticised the regime in 2015. Lawyers for imprisoned Red Brigades militant Nadia Lioce commented that after two decades in 41-bis and because of the restrictions, she had only spoken to visitors for 15 hours over the course of one year.

== Mafia protests ==
In June 2002, some 300 Mafia prisoners declared a hunger strike, calling for an end to the isolation conditions and objecting to parliament's Antimafia Commission proposal to extend the measure. Apart from refusing prison food, the inmates had been constantly banging the metalwork of their cells. After the protest began in Marina Picena prison in central Italy – the prison's inmates include Salvatore Riina, the reputed "boss of bosses" – it spread rapidly across the country, in spite of inmates supposedly having no way to contact one another. Mobsters of different ranks in eight prisons had joined in.

According to American immigration judge Darcy Sitgraves in October 2007, the 41-bis prison regime was designed to physically and psychologically compel criminals to reveal information about the Sicilian Mafia and constituted "coercion … not related to any lawfully imposed sanction or punishment, and thus constitutes torture." The judge based her ruling on the United Nations Convention Against Torture. Immigration and Customs Enforcement successfully appealed the ruling.

== European Court of Human Rights ==
On 27 November 2007, the European Court of Human Rights held that the application of the 41-bis regime breached two articles of the European Convention on Human Rights, namely Article 6 § 1 (right to a fair hearing), and Article 8 (right to respect for private and family life). The court did not find against the regime as a whole, but re-affirmed the right to uncensored correspondence with lawyers and human-rights groups. The ruling was in response to a suit filed by Santo Asciutto, a member of the Calabrian crime syndicate 'Ndrangheta, who is serving a life sentence for murder. In the case Enea vs. Italy on 17 September 2009, the court found that there had been breaches of his right to a fair hearing, and to respect for his correspondence. He was awarded some legal costs but no damages.

== Alfredo Cospito ==
Alfredo Cospito, an Italian anarchist, began a hunger strike against his incarceration under the 41-bis regime in 2022. By the end of January 2023, he had reached over 100 days without food and Amnesty International made an appeal based on violations of his human rights. This led to coverage in the global mainstream media about debates over the efficacy of 41-bis. Attacks on diplomatic offices in Argentina, Bolivia, Germany, Greece, Portugal, Spain, and Switzerland were made as solidarity actions, and in response the Foreign Minister Antonio Tajani said security was being heightened at all missions. The Supreme Court of Cassation initially rejected Cospito's appeal against his prison conditions, then set a hearing date for 24 February 2023.

== See also ==
- Close Supervision Centre
- FIES
