= Brodie Clark =

- Born: Robert Brodie Clark; 16 June 1951 (age 75); Glasgow, Scotland
- Education: University of Glasgow
- Occupations: Civil servant, prison consultant
- Spouse: Jennifer Taylor (m. 1976)
- Children: 2

Robert Brodie Clark CBE (born 16 June 1951), better known as Brodie Clark, is a British security consultant and former civil servant.

== Career ==
Brodie Clark started his career in Her Majesty's Prison Service in 1973 as assistant governor HM Borstal Wetherby, from 1977 to 1981 he was at Acklington prison and from 1981 to 1994 had appointments as governor at Gartree, Bedford and Woodhill prisons. In 1994 he was appointed governor to Whitemoor top security jail. In September of that year, six prisoners - including Paul Magee and other IRA members - escaped from the prison's Special Secure Unit after smuggling a gun into the prison. All were recaptured within minutes.

Clark was appointed head of Border Force, a part of the UK Border Agency, in 2008.

In November 2011, Clark was suspended and later resigned from Border Force amid a controversy over the relaxation of border checks. Then-Home Secretary Theresa May had approved a pilot scheme allowing reduced checks for EU nationals, but it was alleged that Clark had extended these relaxations to non-EU passengers without ministerial approval. Clark denied the accusations, asserting that he had acted within his authority and was being used as a scapegoat for broader failures in the UK Border Agency. He appeared before the Home Affairs Select Committee, where he strongly defended his decisions and criticized the Home Office for misrepresenting the situation. He later pursued legal action against the Home Office, reportedly reaching an out-of-court settlement. On 19 January 2012, the Committee published its report, Inquiry into the provision of UK Border Controls.

Since 2013, Clark has worked as a consultant in security and border operations.
