= Ucciardone Prison =

Prison in Palermo, Italy

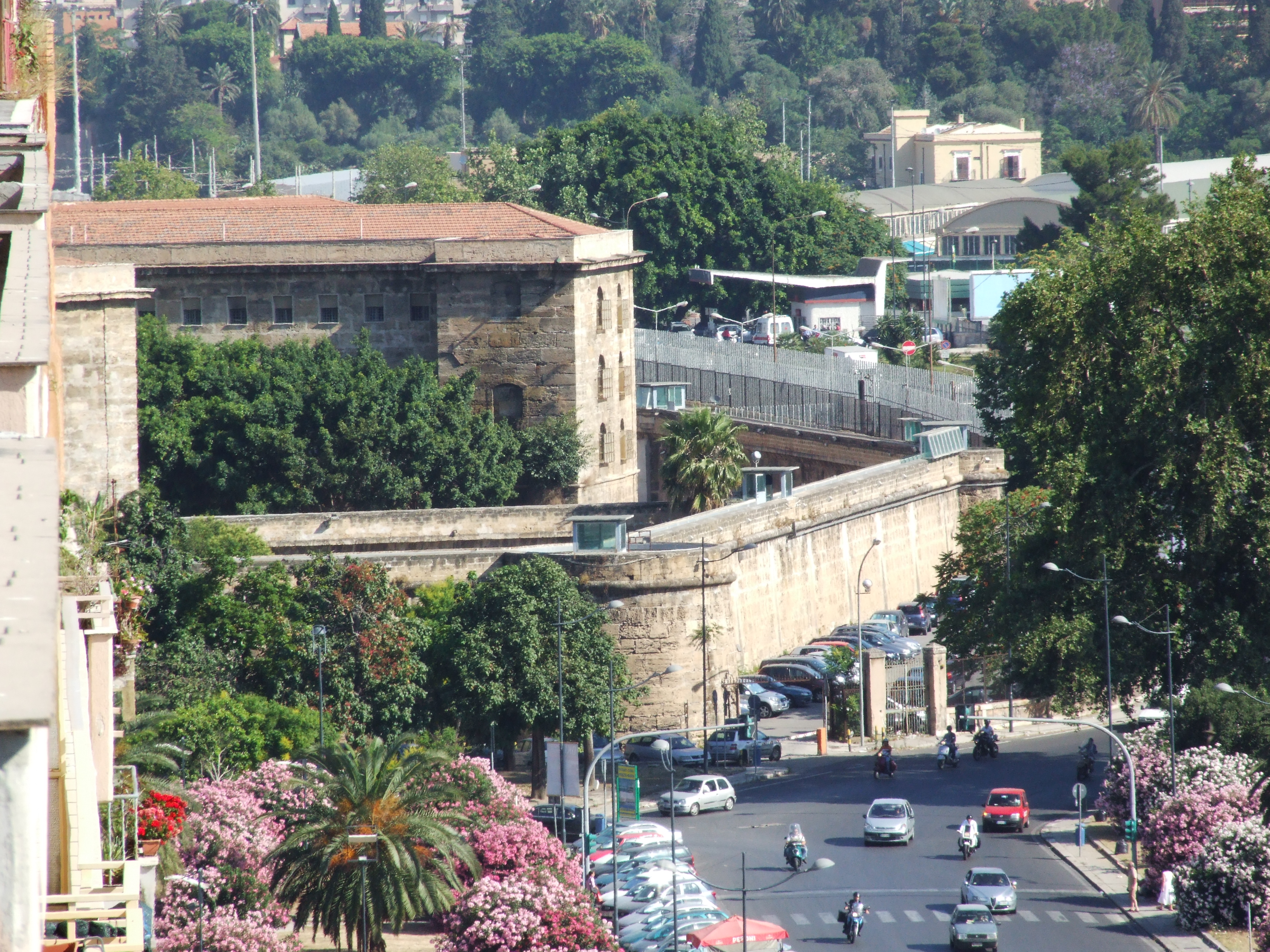
- The Ucciardone in 2009
- Interactive map of Ucciardone Prison
- Location: Via Enrico Albanese 3, Palermo, Italy; 38.1328°N 13.3578°E
- Status: Operational
- Security class: Casa di reclusione
- Capacity: 569
- Population: 587 (23 October 2026)
- Opened: 1842
- Managed by: Ministry of Justice
- Governor: Fabio Prestopino

The Ucciardone (Italian: Carcere dell'Ucciardone), officially the Casa di reclusione "Calogero Di Bona", is a prison in Palermo, Sicily, Italy. Designed in the early 19th century under the Bourbon monarchy, it has been in use since 1842.

Until the early 1990s it held many leading members of the Sicilian Mafia, who called it the "Grand Hotel" because of the privileges they enjoyed there. The Maxi Trial against the Mafia opened in 1986 in a bunker courtroom built inside the prison compound.

== History ==
The name comes from the field of thistles (French chardon, Sicilian u ciarduni) on which the prison was built.

The prison was designed at the beginning of the 19th century by the architect Nicolò Puglia and later remodelled by architect Emmanuele Palazzotto (1798–1872). It began operating in 1842, when the inmates of the old Vicaria prison were transferred there.

In 2014–2015, as part of a reorganization of the prisons in Sicily, the Ucciardone was reclassified from a casa circondariale, which also holds people awaiting trial, to a casa di reclusione for prisoners serving final sentences.

On 8 January 2018 the prison was named after Calogero Di Bona, a marshal of the prison guards who was killed by the Mafia on 28 August 1979.

== Mafia inmates ==
Mafia bosses held at the Ucciardone called it the "Grand Hotel Ucciardone". According to the journalist Attilio Bolzoni, they told their wives they were going on holiday when they were taken there. He wrote that inside they dined on lobster, and that the state let it happen.

On 9 February 1954 Gaspare Pisciotta, the lieutenant of the bandit Salvatore Giuliano, who was serving a life sentence, drank a cup of coffee in the cell he shared with his father. He died shortly afterwards in the prison infirmary, and the autopsy found strychnine.

After the killing of Paolo Borsellino in the via D'Amelio bombing of 19 July 1992, the justice minister Claudio Martelli signed the decree that introduced the 41-bis regime. Within hours the Mafia bosses held at the Ucciardone were taken to the island prison of Pianosa. According to Nicolò Amato, then head of the prison administration, the order to transfer 55 inmates from the Ucciardone to Pianosa was signed on 20 July.

== Bunker courtroom ==
The bunker courtroom in May 2018

For the Maxi Trial a bunker courtroom was built inside the Ucciardone in six months, at a cost of 36 billion lire. The trial opened there on 10 February 1986, with 400 defendants held in cages. The courtroom stands within the historic walls of the prison. On 12 November 2022 it was named after the magistrates Giovanni Falcone and Paolo Borsellino, in a ceremony attended by President Sergio Mattarella.

A cell in the reserved area of the bunker courtroom held the pentito Tommaso Buscetta while he testified at the Maxi Trial. In 1993 the same cell was used by Salvatore Riina, who was moved there after his capture to attend his own trials. The cell was shown to the press in May 2022, during a conference of the prosecutors general of the Council of Europe.

== Population and conditions ==
According to the Ministry of Justice, on 23 October 2026 the prison held 587 inmates, against an official capacity of 569 places, 24 of which were not available. At the end of September 2026 its staff included 301 officers of the prison police, out of 341 planned.

In July 2026 the members of the European Parliament Leoluca Orlando and Giuseppe Lupo visited the prison. The visit was organised by Palermo's municipal ombudsman for prisoners, Pino Apprendi. Orlando reported a climate of strong tension, with cases of self-harm and hunger strikes, and said that psychiatric patients were being left in extremely hot rooms. Lupo said that the ninth section had to be closed because of hygiene problems and structural deficiencies that could not be remedied, and Apprendi also called for its closure.

== Work and activities ==
Most working inmates are employed by the prison administration itself, mainly on cleaning.
