= HM Prison Whitemoor =

Prison in Cambridgeshire, England

Coordinates: 52.57505°N 0.07927°E

HMP Whitemoor
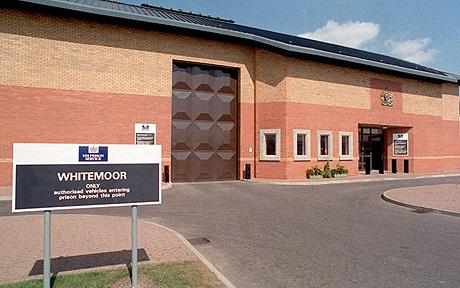
- Interactive map of HMP Whitemoor
- Location: March, Cambridgeshire
- Security class: Adult Male/Category A
- Population: 458 (December 2011)
- Opened: 1991
- Managed by: HM Prison Services
- Governor: Ruth Stephens
- Website: Whitemoor at justice.gov.uk

HM Prison Whitemoor is a Category A men's prison near March, Cambridgeshire, England, operated by His Majesty's Prison Service.

== History ==
Whitemoor Prison was built on the site of an old railway marshalling yard and was opened in 1991 by Norma Major.

In September 1994 while under the governorship of Brodie Clark, six prisoners including London gangster Andy Russell, Paul Magee and other IRA members, escaped from the prison's Special Secure Unit after smuggling a gun into the prison. All were recaptured within minutes.

In April 2005, it was alleged that a wind turbine situated near Whitemoor Prison was being switched off in the early mornings because the flickering shadows it created annoyed inmates. The turbine had been halted because of possible security problems if prisoners became upset over the flickering shadows.

In August 2005, the prison was locked down for two days following an explosion in a wing. A full search was carried out, though the explosion caused no damage to the prison.

In June 2006, an inspection report from His Majesty's Chief Inspector of Prisons criticised staff at Whitemoor Prison for ignoring prisoners, and not responding to their queries and requests for help promptly enough. The report also criticised the prison's healthcare provision and pharmacy, as well stating that black and Asian prisoners felt subtle discrimination against them. However, the report did praise Whitemoor's specialist units – such as the dangerous and severe personality disorders wing – which were said to be performing well.

=== Radical influence ===
A further inspection report stated, in October 2008, that staff at Whitemoor Prison felt that Muslim inmates were attempting to radicalise other prisoners. According to inspectors, officers tended to treat Muslim prisoners as extremists and potential security risks, even though only eight of them had been convicted of terrorist offences. Due to the concerns raised by this inspection, further visits by researchers from the Cambridge Institute of Criminology, commissioned by the Ministry of Justice, were arranged between 2009 and 2010 to interview staff and inmates.

In November 2011, the Cambridge Institute of Criminology published their researchers' findings. A number of prisoners had told researchers that they had converted to Islam for protection or because they were bullied into it: reasons given for conversion included "seeking care and protection", "gang membership" and "coercion" as well as "rebellion" as Islam was seen as the "underdog". Non-believers avoided confrontation with any Muslim in case it led to retribution from the wider group, and would avoid cooking pork in communal kitchens or undressing in the showers in case it caused offence. A number of non-Muslims and prison officers claimed that converts did so to join an "organised gang" and a "protection racket" which "glorified terrorist behaviour and exploited the fear related to it". Non-Muslims would be visited by inmates with Islamic literature, who would tell them to "read this" and promise they would be safe from physical assault if they changed faith. In its conclusion, the report noted: "The new population mix, including younger, more black and minority ethnic and mixed race, and high numbers of Muslim prisoners, was disrupting established hierarchies in the prison. Social relations among prisoners had become complex and less visible. Too much power flowed among some groups of prisoners, with some real risks of serious violence. There were high levels of fear in the prison. In particular, there were tensions and fears relating to 'extremism' and 'radicalisation'."

A report by HM Chief Inspector of Prisons on Whitemoor, following an inspection in January 2014, stated that the prison housed 454 adult men, of which approximately 40% were Muslim. The report identified "some Muslim prisoners convicted of terrorist offences who were an adverse influence on others".

=== 2020 Terror attack ===
At approximately 9.10am, on 9 January, two prisoners wearing fake suicide belts approached and attacked a prison officer. The prison officer received injuries to his head and neck and the attackers used improvised bladed weapons during the assault. Three prison officers and a nurse also suffered injuries as they rushed to the aid of their stabbed colleague. One of the attackers was understood to be Brusthom Ziamani, 24, who was found guilty of preparing an act of terrorism in 2015. Ziamani was assisted by another prisoner, a Muslim convert who was serving a sentence for a violent offence. The Met Police said it was "deemed appropriate" its counter-terrorism command unit was sent to HMP Whitemoor "due to certain circumstances relating to this incident".

== The prison today ==
Whitemoor houses around 500 of the most dangerous prisoners in the UK. The prison has a Dangerous Severe Personality Disorder (DSPD) unit and a Close Supervision Centre (CSC). The centre is a prison inside the prison. Whitemoor does not accept any prisoners who are serving less than four years.

The regime includes vocational training courses in the construction industry and furniture craft, and production workshops involve recycling work and a laundry. The prison offers full-time, half-time and part-time education courses including basic skills, GCSEs, Level 3 Access to Higher Education and Open University courses.

The Healthcare Centre includes a nine bed in-patients' facility. The centre employs a full-time doctor and provides twenty-four-hour nursing services. Out of hours medical cover is provided by an on-call service. Other facilities include a gymnasium and a shop.

== Notable inmates ==
- Robert Maudsley – Serial killer who spent more than 40 years in solitary confinement at HMP Wakefield before being moved to HMP Whitemoor in 2025.
