= FIES =

Spanish prison regime

FIES (Ficheros de Internos de Especial Seguimiento, meaning "Files of Inmates under Special Monitoring") is a restrictive Spanish prison regime which involves 22 hours of solitary confinement every day. After first being imposed on those convicted of terrorism or membership of armed groups such as ETA, it was extended to particularly violent prisoners and major drug traffickers. FIES has been criticised for being applied to prisoners who have not committed offences covered by the regime.

== Regime ==
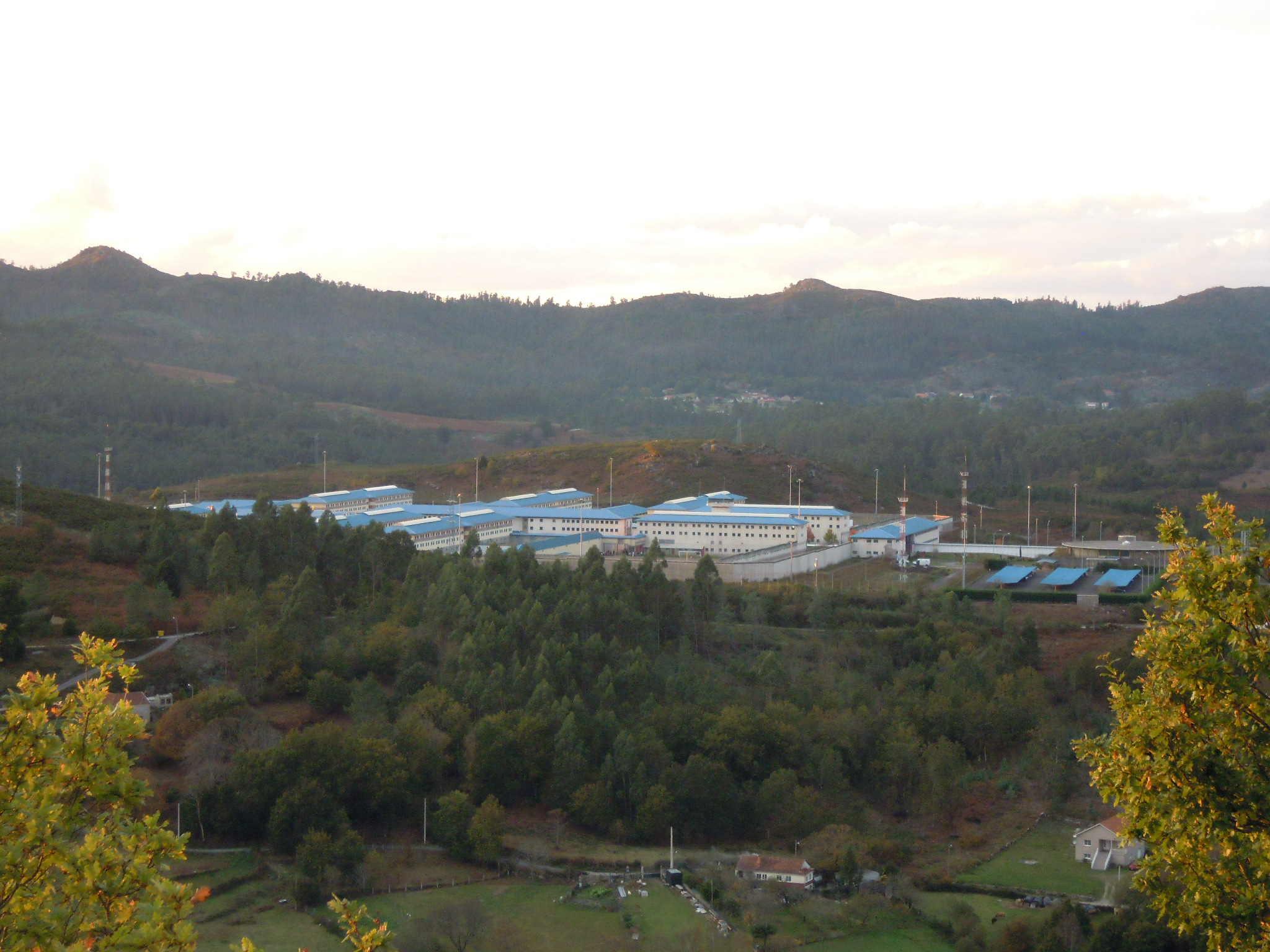
A Lama prison in 2011

The FIES regime (Ficheros de Internos de Especial Seguimiento, meaning "Files of Inmates under Special Monitoring") places prisoners into a restrictive system which involves 22 hours of solitary confinement every day, monitoring of all communications without judicial oversight and frequent changes of both cell and prison. FIES was first mentioned in 1989 in a circular which advised placing prisoners who were convicted of terrorism or membership of armed groups into the regime; two years later it was extended to include particularly violent prisoners and major drug traffickers. Under FIES, all details about the prisoner's existence and interactions are recorded. In 2002, the United Nations Committee Against Torture criticised FIES and the Supreme Court of Spain modified the regime in 2009. As of 2021, it covered five categories, namely: FIES-1 CD (Direct Control); FIES-2 DO (Organized Delinquency); FIES-3 BA (Armed Groups), FIES-4 FS (Security); FIES-5 CE (Special Characteristics).

The first prison to use the FIES regime was in Badajoz and Patxi Zamoro was the first FIES inmate. Anarchist Xosé Tarrío González wrote a book about his incarceration entitled Huye, hombre, huye: diario de un prisono FIES (Flee, man, flee: diary of a FIES prisoner); he died in the FIES unit at Coruna in 2005. Insurrectionary anarchist Gabriel Pombo da Silva escaped from a FIES unit in 2004 before being re-arrested and put back in the regime in 2020, under the FIES-5 category. Other prisoners such as Jose Antonio Cano have killed themselves whilst incarcerated. In 2018, there were prisoners held under the FIES regime at A Lama prison and Puerto III, the high security section of Puerto de Santa María prison.

FIES has been criticised for being applied to prisoners who have not committed offences covered by the regime. For example, Vladimir Kokorev, Yulia Maleeva and their son Igor were arrested on an Interpol notice in Panama in 2015, on suspicion of money laundering on behalf of Teodoro Obiang, President of Equatorial Guinea. They were extradited to Spain and held in pre-trial detention in a prison on the Canary Islands under the FIES regime, without any charge being made against them. In 2019, their lawyer took their case to the European Court of Human Rights. In another case, the non-governmental organisation Fair Trials noted that ten young people were arrested after a bar fight with two off-duty police officers in Alsasua, in the province of Navarre. Three were held for eighteen months in pre-trial detention under the FIES regime before being convicted on charges not related to terrorism.

Basque National Liberation Movement prisoners have been held under FIES. After ETA ceased armed struggle in 2011, the General Secretariat of Penitentiary Institutions confirmed that 40 ETA prisoners including Iñaki Bilbao Goikoetxea would remain in the FIES regime. Other inmates have included murderer Fabrizio João Silva, jihadist Younes Zayyad, and Roberto Vaquero, general secretary of the Marxist–Leninist Party (Communist Reconstruction), who was convicted of possession of explosives and collaboration with the Kurdistan Workers' Party (PKK), a proscribed group in Spain. Politician Rodrigo Rato was convicted on embezzlement charges and placed into the FIES regime in 2017 alongside 14 co-conspirators. Two puppeteers were detained under FIES category 3 (membership of armed groups) after a performance in 2016, before being acquitted at trial.

== See also ==
- Article 41-bis prison regime
- Close Supervision Centre
