= Alfredo Cospito =

Italian anarchist writer and activist (born 1967)

- Born: 14 July 1967 (age 59); Pescara, Abruzzo, Italy
- Movement: Anarchist
- Status: Imprisoned since 2012
- Allegiance: Informal Anarchist Federation
- Convictions: Terrorism, mass murder
- Penalty: Life imprisonment later reduced to 23 years

Alfredo Cospito (born 1967) is an Italian anarchist. In his twenties, he refused conscription to military service and was convicted of desertion, then pardoned after going on hunger strike for one month. In 2012, he was sentenced to 10 years for kneecapping the head of the Italian nuclear power company Ansaldo Nucleare. Whilst imprisoned, he was convicted of the 2006 bombing of a Carabinieri barracks in which nobody was harmed. The Supreme Court of Cassation later increased the sentence to life imprisonment without parole.

In 2022, Cospito was placed into the 41-bis prison regime which involves solitary confinement for 22 hours every day. In protest, he began a hunger strike in October 2022. Groups supporting Cospito have made demonstrations in Italy and symbolic attacks on Italian diplomatic offices globally; the Italian Foreign Minister Antonio Tajani, who denounced receiving death threats, blamed an international anarchist network. The Supreme Court of Italy rejected the appeal against his placement in the 41-bis system in March 2023, then the following month the Constitutional Court ruled in favour of allowing the reduction of Cospito's sentence. In response to the latter, he stopped his hunger strike after 180 days on 19 April 2023; he had lost 50 kg. In June 2023, the Turin Court of Assizes reduced the sentence on Cospito regarding the Fossano bombing from life imprisonment to 23 years.

== Early life ==
Cospito was born in Pescara in 1967. He refused to continue military service after being conscripted in his twenties and was convicted of desertion, then pardoned by Francesco Cossiga, President of Italy, after going on hunger strike for one month. In the early 1990s, he was involved in squatting actions in Bologna, Pescara and Lake Maggiore, being arrested for the attempt to make a self-managed social centre in the Ex Aurum in Pescara. He moved to Turin and met his wife Anna Beniamino; together they ran a tattoo shop. He is an anarchist.

== Kneecapping of Adinolfi ==
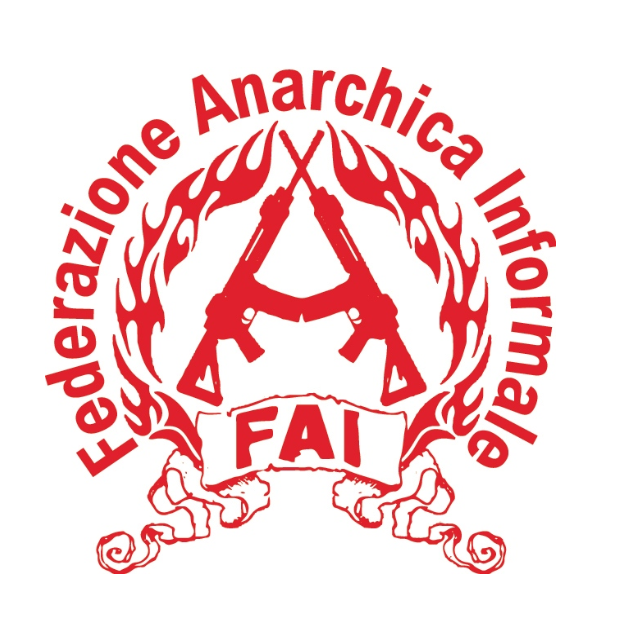
Logo of Federazione Anarchica Informale

On 7 May 2012, Cospito and his accomplice, Nicola Gai, rode on a motorbike to the house of Roberto Adinolfi, executive of the Italian nuclear power company Ansaldo Nucleare. The pair shot Adinolfi in the leg three times, fracturing his knee in an action known as kneecapping. A four-page communiqué sent to Corriere della Sera newspaper claimed responsibility for the shooting on behalf of the Olga Cell of the FAI (Italian: Federazione Anarchica Informale, FAI), taking its name in solidarity with imprisoned Conspiracy of Fire Nuclei member Olga Ikondomidou.

In the early hours of the morning of 14 September 2012, Cospito was arrested with Gai in Turin. The pair were linked to the crime via surveillance footage, wiretaps and textual analysis of the communiqué and were found guilty; they were each sentenced to ten years and eight months in jail. During the trial, Cospito and Gai claimed responsibility for the attack, with Cospito stating; "On a splendid May morning I took action and in those few hours I fully enjoyed life. For once I left fear and self-blame behind and challenged the unknown. In a Europe dotted with nuclear power plants, one of the main culprits of the nuclear disaster to come has fallen at my feet." Gai was released in 2020.

== Bombing of Carabinieri barracks ==
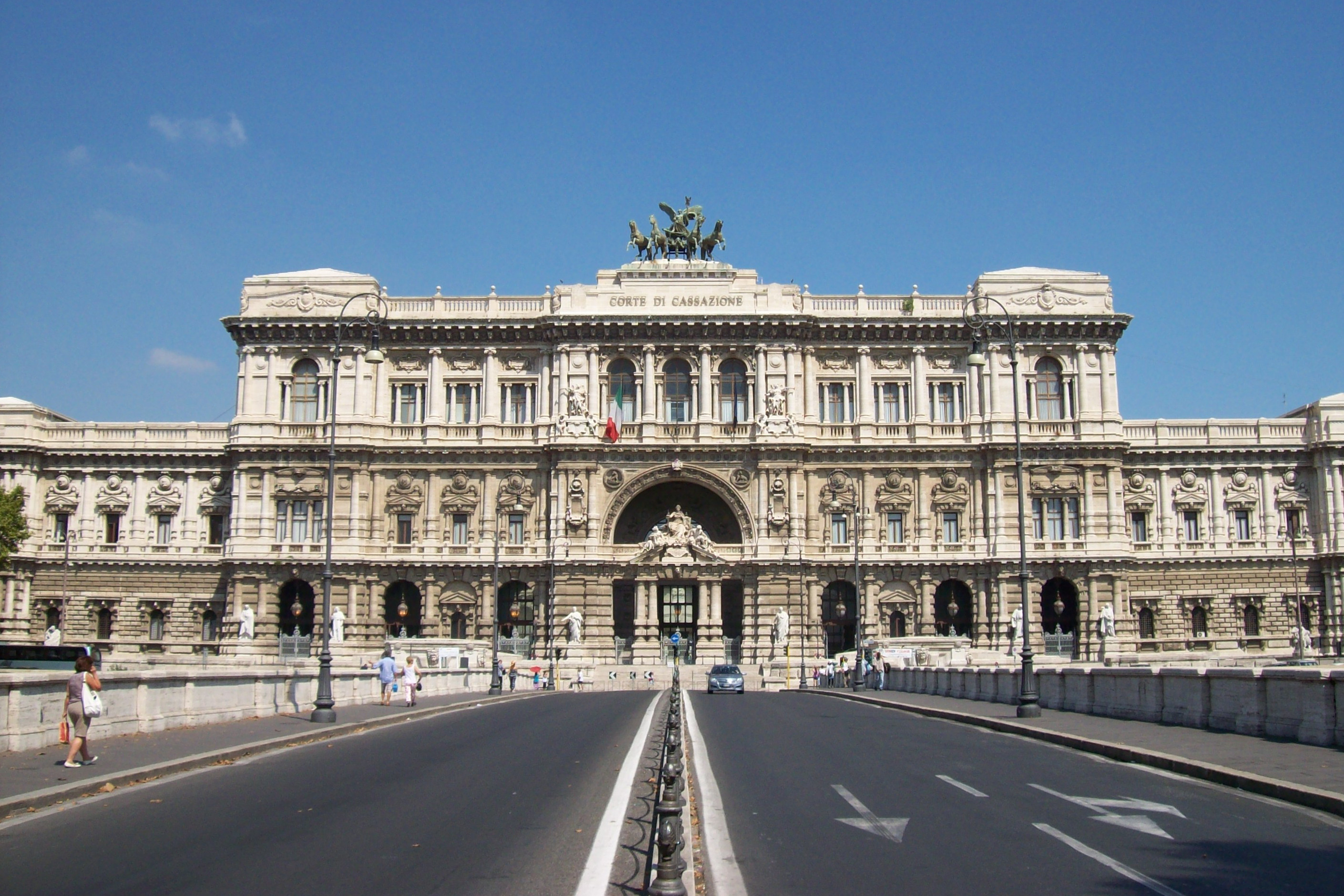
The Supreme Court of Cassation in Rome

While serving his sentence, Cospito received an additional 20-year term for the 2006 bombing of a Carabinieri cadet barracks near Turin. His partner Anna Beniamino was also convicted, receiving a sentence of 16 1/2 years. The attack was claimed under the acronym Animal and Tremendous Revolt/Informal Anarchist Federation (RAT/FAI) in a letter sent to the Corriere della Sera. The bombing was planned with a booby-trap technique, with two explosive devices: a minor one which went off first, and a second one with a much higher potential (500 grams of black powder along with bolts, screws and stones) timed to explode 15 minutes later to kill, according to investigators. In the opinion of the court, it was only by luck that nobody had died.

The Supreme Court of Cassation later changed the sentence to "massacre against the state", upgrading it from 20 years in prison to life without parole. This crime, enacted by Mussolini was previously punished with the death penalty. The FAI declared the bombing was an attack against "the infamous Italian Republic and the equally infamous anniversary of the Carabinieri. We hit the Carabinieri school in Fossano to make them understand from an early age what admiration their criminal military career provokes in us, the exploited."

== 41-bis and hunger strike ==
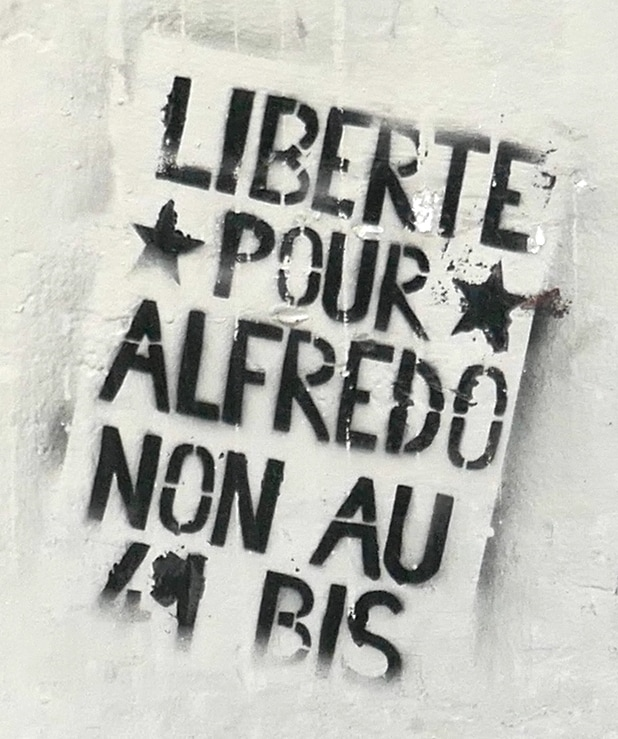
Graffiti in Biel/Bienne (Switzerland), March 2023.

Cospito was moved into the restrictive 41-bis prison regime in Bancali prison in Sassari by the order of then Minister of Justice Marta Cartabia in May 2022. He was the first anarchist to be put into 41-bis. This regime was created to stop mafia bosses communicating with their outside organizations and was later broadened to include "mafia, criminal, terrorist or subversive associations"; it involves solitary confinement for 22 hours every day, with visits restricted to one hour per month. Access to rehabilitation programs is severely limited, as much as needed to prevent communication with the criminal organisation the inmate belongs to. Cospito commented "In addition to life imprisonment, given that from prison I continued to write and collaborate with the anarchist press, it was decided to shut my mouth forever with 41-bis".

On 20 October 2022, Cospito began a hunger strike against the conditions of the 41-bis regime, losing almost 50 kg by 9 February. More than 200 criminal lawyers and jurists signed a petition condemning the judicial treatment of Cospito. In protest, anarchist groups held demonstrations in Bologna, Turin and Rome. At the start of December a Greek anarchist group called Revenge Cell Carlo Giuliani (named after Carlo Giuliani who was killed by police during the 2001 Genoa G8 summit), set alight two empty cars of senior Italian diplomat Susanna Schlein within the garage of her private residences, leading to an unusually large media and political interest. The alleged perpetrators released a communique five days later via Athens indymedia. The communique cited the reasons around Cospito's protest against the 41-bis regime, stating "The 41 bis is a regime of political, social and sensory extermination, aimed at the complete elimination of all contact with the outside world. Comrades, no matter how much they try to bury you, we will never forget you" as well as critiquing the migration and asylum policies of the Meloni government. There have also been attacks on Italian diplomatic offices in Argentina, Bolivia, Germany, Greece, Portugal, Spain and Switzerland. In response, Italian Foreign Minister Antonio Tajani claimed that an international anarchist network was carrying out an "attack against Italy, against Italian institutions", while Interior Minister Matteo Piantedosi repeated the need for the 41-bis regime. Incarcerated anarchists Anna Beniamino, Juan Sorroche, and Ivan Alocco began hunger strikes in solidarity with Alfredo. Beniamino, incarcerated in Rebibbia Prison in Rome, ended her strike after 37 days saying "I've reached my objective, to get people talking about Alfredo Cospito's condition."

A political scandal developed when Giovanni Donzelli, coordinator of the ruling Brothers of Italy party, announced in the Chamber of Deputies that Cospito was being manipulated by incarcerated mafia members and criticised members of the Democratic Party for meeting with him. Donzelli had been leaked a video of Cospito in prison by his flatmate Andrea Delmastro Delle Vedove who is the Justice Minister's state secretary. The Democratic Party called for both men to resign and Giorgia Meloni (Prime Minister and leader of the Brothers of Italy) called for calm. The surveillance court in Rome rejected the appeal of Cospito against his prison conditions and Amnesty International made a plea on behalf of the human rights of Cospito. The Supreme Court of Cassation set a date to hear his appeal against the 41-bis regime on 20 April 2023, then brought it forward to 24 February when Cospito's doctor and lawyer argued he would be dead by April. At the end of January, Cospito was moved from Sardinia to Opera prison in Milan on account of his deteriorating health. In February, Minister of Justice Carlo Nordio said he refused the appeal of Cospito's lawyer. The Court of Cassation then rejected Cospito's appeal against the imposition of 41-bis. The National Bioethics Committee said it would continue to consider whether Cospito could refuse treatment. After his appeal was rejected, Cospito was returned from the San Paolo hospital to the Opera prison's medical department, where he declared his intention to cease taking dietary supplements. During an announcement by Cospito's lawyers that they were planning an appeal to the European Court of Human Rights, they published a letter from Cospito in which he proclaimed his willingness to die in order to "let the world know what the 41 bis really is".

Cospito's lawyer reported in March 2023 that while waiting on an appeal to be transferred to house arrest, Cospito had suffered a cardiac arrest, his condition stabilizing after receiving an injection of potassium. This report was played down by both the court and the medical staff at the hospital. The supervisory courts of Milan and Sassari rejected the request for house arrest; judges cited "the obvious danger" of releasing Cospito. On 18 April 2023, the Constitutional Court ruled in favour of allowing the reduction of Cospito's sentence. The following day, Cospito announced that he was stopping his hunger strike after 180 days, having lost 50 kg.

In June 2023, the Turin Court of Assizes reduced the sentence on Cospito regarding the Fossano bombing from life imprisonment to 23 years. Cospito commented in court "There is no evidence that we placed the bombs in Fossano [...] Anarchists do not make indiscriminate massacres, because anarchists are not the state".

Two anarchists, Alessandro 'Sandrone' Mercogliano and Sara Ardizzone, were killed in an explosives accident in March 2026, bringing Cospito back into the press. La Repubblica noted ideological, personal and organizational links between the trio as well as Ardizzone being a previous co-defendant of Cospito in the Sibilia investigation. Other outlets claimed the explosives were intended as a solidarity action for Cospito.

== Selected works ==
- (2023) I Am Ready To Die – Last letter from prison
- (2017) Operation Scripta Manent – Statement to the court
- (2013) From the Belly of the Leviathan – Declaration at the trial for the kneecapping of Roberto Adinolfi

== See also ==
- Alfredo Bonanno
- Anarchism in Italy
- Anarchist Black Cross
- Insurrectionary anarchism
- Individualist anarchism in Europe
- Prison Abolition
