= Close Supervision Centre =

Type of prison in the United Kingdom

Close Supervision Centres were established by UK Prison Service in 1998, as a means to segregate the most violent or disruptive prisoners. As of 2021, there were 52 inmates held in the restrictive regime, which involves solitary confinement. The United Nations Special Rapporteur on Torture and Other Cruel, Inhuman or Degrading Treatment or Punishment and Amnesty International have raised concerns about the centres.

== Usage ==
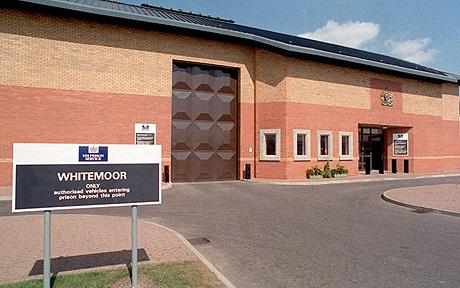
HM Prison Whitemoor in 2009

Close Supervision Centres (CSCs) were established in the UK in 1998, as a means to segregate the most violent or disruptive prisoners detained in His Majesty's Prison Service. Under this restrictive regime, prisoners are kept in solitary confinement and are allowed one hour per day of recreation; they cannot speak with other inmates and are limited to two visits of thirty minutes per month.

As of 2015, there were 50 prisoners held in CSCs, with the annual cost to hold each prisoner estimated to be £100,000. The Guardian newspaper reported in 2021 that the total was 52. Nils Melzer, the United Nations Special Rapporteur on Torture and Other Cruel, Inhuman or Degrading Treatment or Punishment found the conditions in CSCs to be "comparable to solitary detention" and was particularly concerned by the case of Kevan Thakrar, who had been held in CSCs for 11 years. Amnesty International stated the regime was "cruel, inhumane or degrading treatment".

Prisons with CSCs include HM Prison Woodhill and HM Prison Whitemoor. In 2022, Deputy Prime Minister Dominic Raab announced that the government would spend £6 million to expand the CSC regime.

== See also ==
- Article 41-bis prison regime
- FIES
- Supermax prison
