= HM Prison Woodhill =

Men's prison in Milton Keynes

HMP Woodhill
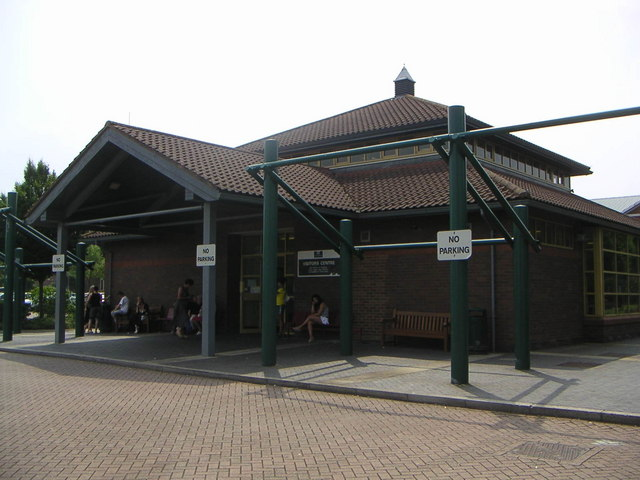
- The prison's visitor centre
- Interactive map of HMP Woodhill
- Location: Milton Keynes, Buckinghamshire
- Security class: Adult male/category B training prison (former category A prison until 2020)
- Capacity: 644
- Population: approx. 350 (due to temporary closures) (July 2024)
- Opened: 1992
- Managed by: HM Prison Services
- Governor: Damian Evans (as of 28 November 2025)
- Website: Woodhill at justice.gov.uk

HM Prison Woodhill is a category B men's high security prison located in Milton Keynes, England. The prison is operated by His Majesty's Prison Service. A section of the prison is designated as a Young Offenders Institution. A Secure Training Centre is located next to the prison.

One of its main roles is that of a local prison serving the Crown Court and magistrates' courts. The prison holds sentenced prisoners aged 18 and above. In addition, Woodhill is one of the eight national high-security prisons, holding Category B with some Category A prisoners, Close Supervision Centre.

== History ==
Woodhill Prison opened in 1992, with a further unit added to the complex in 1996. In 1998, one wing of the prison was re-designated as a Close Supervision Centre for prisoners who are amongst the most difficult and disruptive in the prison system. Two years later, an inspection report from HM Inspectorate of Prisons criticised conditions in the Close Supervision Centre, stating that inmates being held there were being deprived of mental stimulation and human contact.

== Inspections ==
A further inspection report in February 2003, stated that there were too few prison staff at Woodhill. The report also highlighted the prison's suicide monitoring as an area that needed improvement. However, the staff at the prison were praised for maintaining a positive attitude.

In February 2006, another inspection report from HM Inspectorate of Prisons criticised HMP Woodhill for poorly supporting at-risk prisoners and failing to bring in anti-bullying measures. The report also stated that staff in charge of youths held in the prison had not been trained or vetted to work with them.

In March 2026 the Inspectorate put the prison on urgent notification for the second time in 3 years due to high rates of violence, self-harm, and drug use. The Chief Inspector of Prisons stated that "criminal behaviour is going unchecked by often inexperienced officers." Mentally ill detainees waited as long as 191 days for transfer to secure hospitals, one of the longest wait times the Inspectorate had seen. This prompted a government response stating an intention to send more staff to the prison.

== The prison today ==
Woodhill is a category B Training Prison (listed as category A until 2020 when it was recategorised as category B) for male adults, with an adjacent unit for young offenders. The prison holds convicted prisoners from magistrates' courts along with foreign nationals awaiting deportation.

The regime at Woodhill includes full-time and part-time classes. Other features include a job club, and listener schemes. Woodhill also has a multi-faith full-time chaplaincy. There is a visitors' centre at the prison, run by the Prison Advice and Care Trust.

In 2017, Dr Elizabeth van Horn, an experienced prison psychiatrist, left her job at Woodhill and alleged that staff shortages prevented change. The courts, the Prisons and Probation Ombudsman and the prison's independent monitoring board all expressed concerns over regular understaffing, too much reliance on agency and temporary staff, and assaults on both staff and inmates have also risen in the last few years as have suicides (see below). Van Horn claimed no real changes happened despite promises management made; they knew what needed to be done but did not know how to achieve improvements. Staff shortages meant prisoners were often locked in their cells for 23 hours a day, which added to stress for prisoners with mental health issues.

=== Suicides and murders ===
There were seventeen suicides at Woodhill Prison between 2013 and late 2016. This was the highest suicide rate of any prison in the UK. Staff shortages and the complexity of the prison were blamed.

Woodhill's Independent Monitoring Board had warned over "significant problems" in the prison, due to "serious staff shortages" and "increased use of new psychoactive drugs", which made prisoners inclined to violence and self-harm. Coroners' reports have noted the jail repeatedly failed to meet requirements of national policy on suicide and emergency response.

Taras Nykolyn, a prisoner, was pronounced dead following an incident in Woodhill MCBS on 5 June 2018. A post-mortem found he died from head and facial injuries. Three inmates were arrested on suspicion of murder. Prosecutor Amjad Malik QC later said the men "carefully planned" the killing, and said the attack took place in front of the prison guards. The inquest was conducted in 2021 and the MCBS unit has since been closed.
