= Endnotes (journal) =

Communist theoretical journal

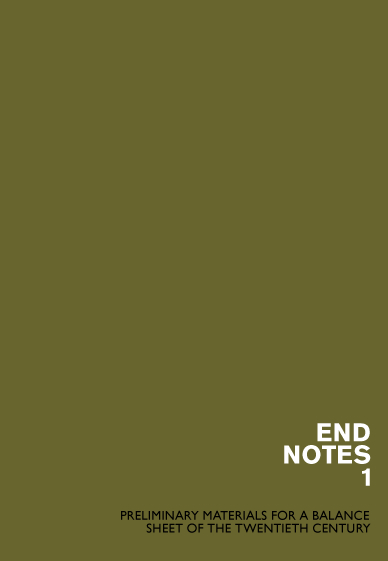
- Cover of the first issue, 2008
- Discipline: Communism, Political theory, Marxian economics
- Language: English
- Edited by: Anonymous collective

Publication details
- History: 5 issues since 2008
- Frequency: Irregular

Standard abbreviations
- ISO 4: Endnotes

Indexing
- ISSN: 1943-8281

Links
- Journal homepage

Endnotes is a communist theoretical journal published by an anonymous collective of the same name. The first issue was released in 2008 by a discussion group that had formed in Brighton, UK, in 2005, later expanding to include participants in Germany and the United States. The journal emerged from debates within the ultraleft and is associated with the political current of communization. Its central project is to produce a "balance sheet of the 20th century" to understand the failures of the historical workers' movement and the changed conditions of class struggle in the 21st century.

The journal's core arguments are that the traditional strategies of the left—which it terms "programmatism"—are obsolete, and that capitalism is increasingly characterized by the production of "surplus populations" whose labor is no longer required for production. Drawing on value-form theory, Endnotes posits that the goal of revolution is not for workers to seize control of the means of production, but to abolish the social relations of capitalism, including value, wage labor, and the working class itself. The journal is noted for its rigorous, academic style and its bleak or pessimistic analysis of contemporary capitalism and social movements. The political theorist Perry Anderson described it as one of the "most impressive publications to emerge in the Bush-Obama era".

== Background ==
The Endnotes collective originated in a discussion group formed in Brighton, UK, in 2005, primarily by former participants in the journal Aufheben after a critical exchange between Aufheben and the French journal Théorie Communiste (TC). The group published its first issue, subtitled Preliminary Materials for a Balance Sheet of the 20th Century, in 2008. The cover of the first issue was solid green, with the journal's name in white. According to the collective, the group's founding commitment was to prioritize an "open-ended internal debate" over political position-taking, with the journal conceived as a "by-product" of this ongoing conversation. For this reason, articles are typically published under the collective name; contributions by named authors are usually commissioned from individuals outside the core group.

The journal's theoretical framework is rooted in the tradition of communization theory. This current of thought, which developed after the social upheavals of May 68, rejects traditional Leninist, social democratic, and anarchist conceptions of revolution. The first issue of Endnotes featured a translation of a debate between key figures in this milieu: the French militant Gilles Dauvé and TC. While sharing the view that revolution must entail the immediate abolition of capitalist social relations, Dauvé and TC differed on its historical possibility. Dauvé argued that communism is an "eternal idea" latent in all workers' struggles, whereas TC, in a view endorsed by Endnotes, contended that communization only became a real possibility in the current stage of capitalism, following the collapse of the 20th-century workers' movement.

From its inception, the Endnotes collective has sought to distinguish its specific theoretical approach from other currents associated with communization. In a contribution to the 2012 book Communization and its Discontents, the collective argued that the "'communization theory' now spoken of in the Anglosphere is largely an imaginary entity, an artefact of the Anglophone reception of various unrelated works." They particularly distanced themselves from the influence of the French journal Tiqqun and its offshoot, The Invisible Committee, whose book The Coming Insurrection had popularized the term. Endnotes criticized this tendency for its voluntarism and its embrace of "prefigurative" practices, such as forming communes or "seceding" from capitalism. For Endnotes, such a strategy is impossible, as capitalism is a "contradictory totality" with no 'outside'. They argue that communization is not a "prefigurative revolutionary practice" to be undertaken in the present, but rather the name for the process of revolution itself, which involves the "direct self-abolition of the working class".

== Key concepts ==
=== Critique of "programmatism" ===
A central concept in Endnotes is the critique of "programmatism". The journal uses this term to describe the dominant form of revolutionary strategy for the century between Karl Marx and the 1970s. Programmatism encompassed the political projects of social democrats, Leninists, and anarcho-syndicalists, all of whom sought to capture industrial production and manage society in a new way, whether through state ownership or workers' councils. This strategy was based on the premise that the working class, by virtue of its central role in production, could seize power and build a new society. The workers' movement aimed to affirm the power and identity of the working class and turn it into the basis of a future social order.

According to Endnotes, this entire model became obsolete after the 1970s. Drawing on the work of the historian Robert Brenner, the journal argues that global capitalism entered a long-term crisis of profitability in the 1970s due to industrial overcapacity. Capitalists responded by breaking unions, closing factories, and moving production to low-wage regions. These transformations, combined with automation, led to a decline in manufacturing employment and the fragmentation of the working class, undermining the material basis for the programmatist model. The journal concludes that for the contemporary working class, which it describes as "a class tending to become a class excluded from work," the old strategies are no longer viable.

=== Surplus population and abjection ===
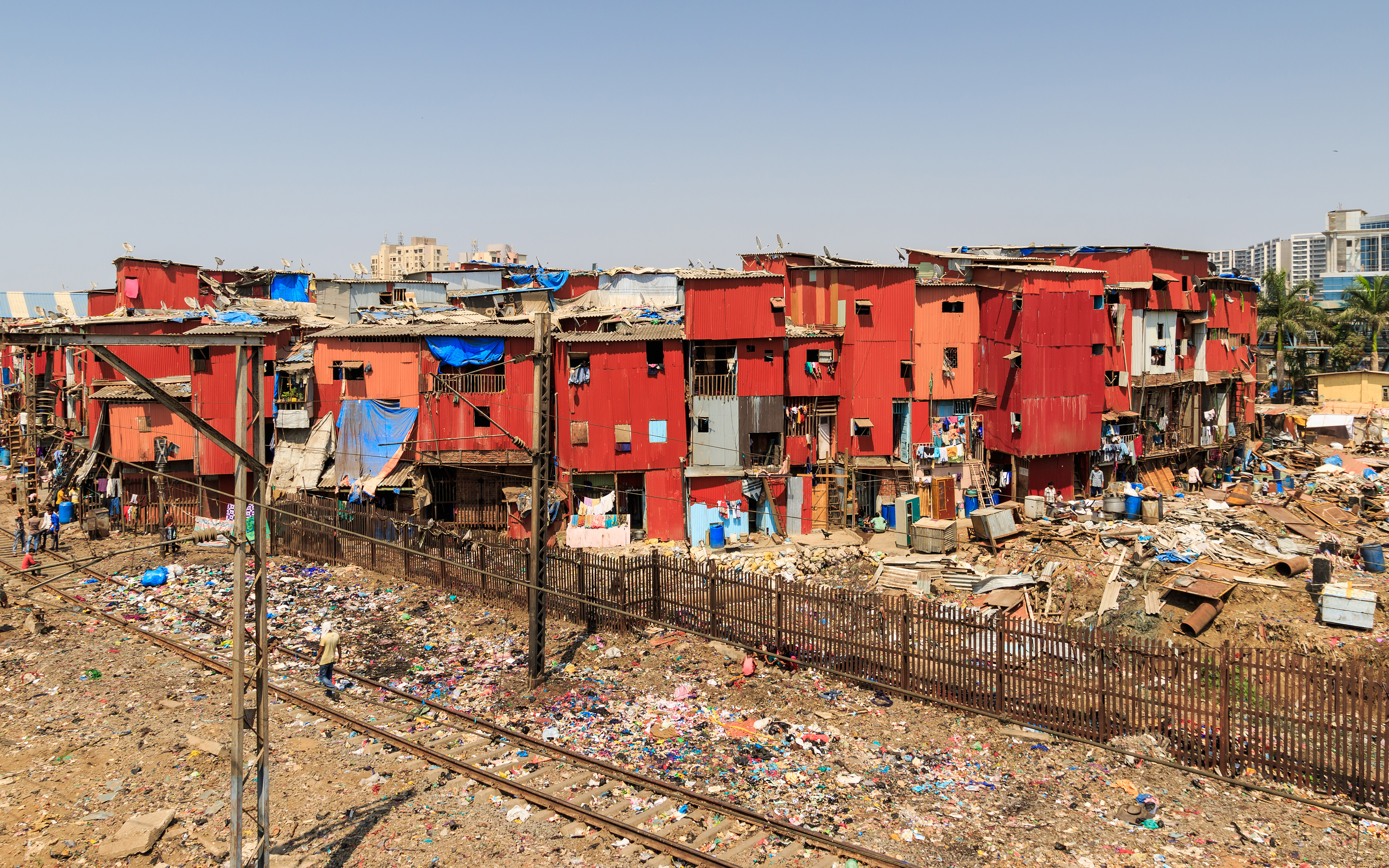
Mumbai slum in 2016. Endnotes analyzes the growth of such large informal settlements as a key feature of contemporary capitalism, housing a "surplus population" excluded from formal wage labor.

In place of the traditional Marxist focus on the exploitation of workers in production, Endnotes argues that the key dynamic of contemporary capitalism is the creation of a "surplus population". This term, borrowed from Marx, refers to a growing number of people who are rendered superfluous to the needs of capital accumulation. The journal contends that globally, deindustrialization and automation have limited the demand for industrial labor, leaving billions of people in a precarious position, unable to sell their labor power. This analysis resonates with mainstream economic research on "premature deindustrialization" by economists such as Dani Rodrik.

For Endnotes, this population is not exploited in the classical sense but is "pure surplus", existing "only to be managed: segregated into prisons, marginalized in ghettos and camps, disciplined by the police, and annihilated by war." This condition is termed "abjection": a state of being excluded from the prevailing forms of social wealth and dignity without being able to exit the system. This contrasts with the "affirmable" identity of the classical labor movement, which saw its power and importance growing.

=== Value-form theory and communization ===
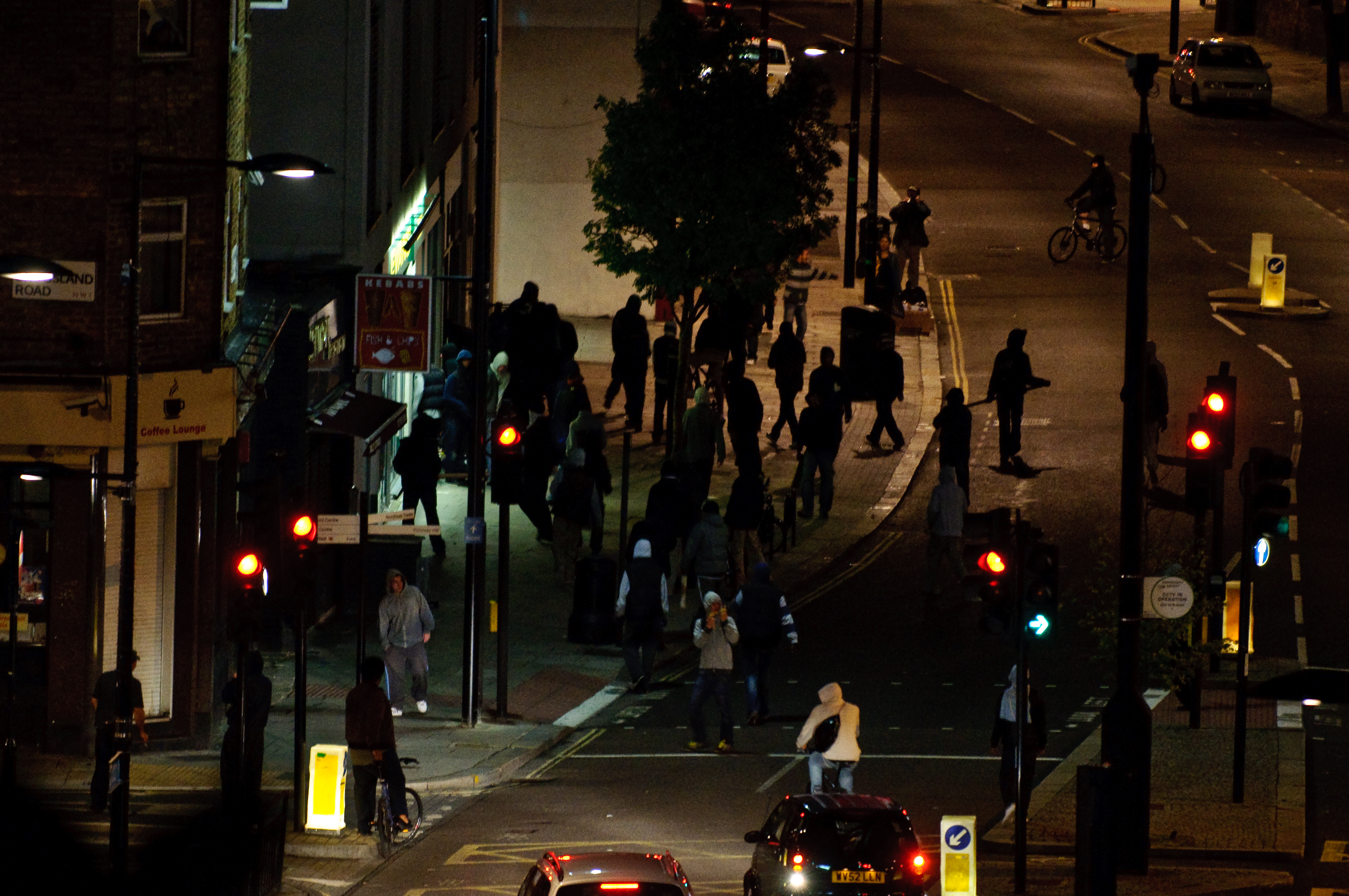
Looting in London during the 2011 England riots. For Endnotes, such acts of direct appropriation of goods represent an embryonic form of communization, bypassing the market and the value-form.

Endnotes draws on a German current of Marxist thought known as value-form theory to redefine the nature of capitalism and the goal of communism. Rejecting the orthodox Marxist view that capitalism is primarily a system of unequal distribution of wealth, value-form theorists argue that the core problem is the form of social relations itself. Capitalism is unique in that society is organized around "abstract labor"—the idea that all forms of human work are made equivalent and measurable by labor time. This logic of value, mediated through money and exchange, dictates the entirety of social life.

From this perspective, socialism cannot be a "giant factory" where workers receive the full value of their labor, as Lenin suggested. Instead, communism must be the abolition of value, abstract labor, and labor time as the mediating principles of society. The goal is for workers to "leave the workplace, not seize it." This leads to the concept of "communization", where the revolutionary process consists of the immediate establishment of communist social relations. This "direct self-abolition of the working class" is contrasted with the traditional idea of a transitional period, such as a socialist state, that would manage the economy after a political revolution. For Endnotes, tactics such as rioting and looting, which directly distribute wealth outside the market, are seen as embodying an embryonic form of communization.

=== Gender, race, and class ===
Endnotes argues that capitalism is a "single integrated whole" that generates multiple, interlocking forms of oppression, including those based on gender, race, and class. It rejects the idea that class is the primary or fundamental form of oppression. Instead, it sees capital itself as the "subject of recent history". In this view, social relations of gender and race are not pre-capitalist relics but are continually reproduced and reshaped by the dynamics of capital accumulation. For example, the journal posits that the separation of a "domestic" sphere of unpaid reproductive labor, largely performed by women, is essential for the functioning of the wage-labor system.

Because capitalism is treated as a systematic totality, the journal argues that revolution must simultaneously overcome all of these divisions. It calls for a "consciousness of capital"—an awareness of how all fates are shaped by this single system—rather than a traditional "class consciousness". It sees the system's pressures as tending to "break things apart" rather than unifying a revolutionary subject.

== Analysis of contemporary politics ==
=== Social movements after 2008 ===
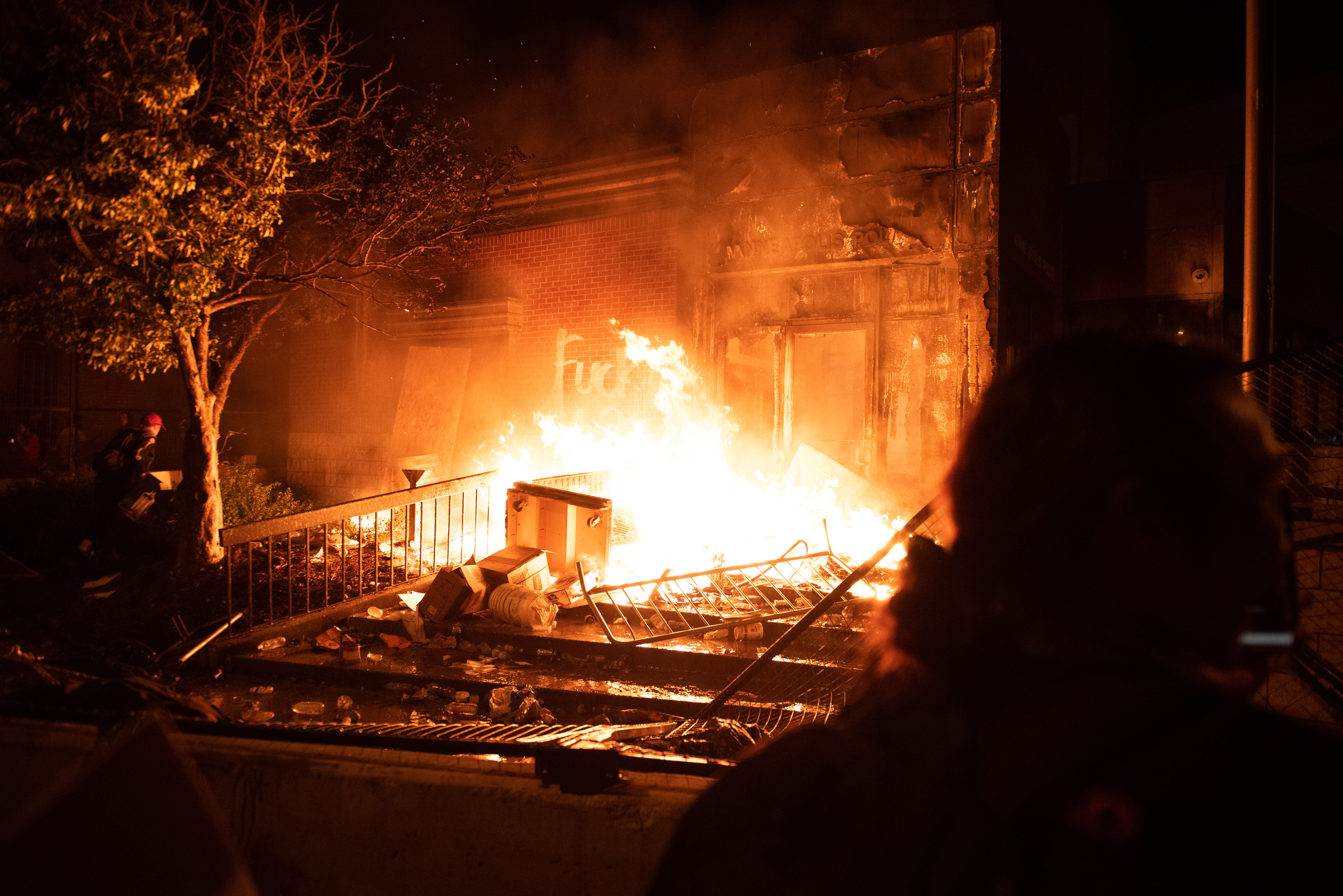
The Minneapolis Police Department's third precinct station on fire during the George Floyd protests in 2020. Endnotes analyzes movements like Black Lives Matter as expressions of the current period, marked by struggles over social reproduction and state violence.

Endnotes has devoted significant analysis to the wave of social movements that followed the 2007–2008 financial crisis, including the California student occupations of 2009, the Arab Spring, the Greek anti-austerity movement, the Occupy movement, the 2011 England riots, and Black Lives Matter (BLM). The journal interprets these struggles as expressions of the new conditions of capitalism, marked by the absence of a workers' identity. It analyzed the use of the term "communization" during the California student protests as an "insurrectionary reinvention of 'TAZ', 'autonomy' etc.", a "blocked" but necessary response to a crisis in which reformist demands seemed meaningless but revolution was not an immediate possibility.

The "movement of the squares" (such as Occupy) is analyzed as a response to the "riddle of composition"—the difficulty of uniting fragmented and competing class fractions. These movements adopted a populist rhetoric of "the people" to bridge these divides, but because they lacked leverage over production, they "evaporated when the squares were cleared." The 2011 England riots are seen as an expression of "abjection", with struggles taking place at sites of consumption rather than production. The journal views BLM as an inheritor of Occupy's failures, with the racial identity of "Black" providing a more concrete, but still internally class-divided, basis for mobilization than Occupy's "the 99%". A common theme in these movements is a "descending modulation", where protests initiated by more stable groups are entered and transformed by the "worse-off", revealing the limits of participatory structures in the face of basic needs.

=== The workers' movement as identity politics ===
In its fourth issue, Endnotes presents a historical analysis of the traditional workers' movement as a form of "identity politics". The journal argues that the "collective worker" was not a spontaneous product of capitalist development but was actively constructed by activists, parties, and unions. This workers' identity was a moral community built around the affirmation of labor, which served to overcome divisions among proletarians and facilitate collective action like strikes.

While this identity was once a powerful tool for achieving political and economic gains, Endnotes argues that it was ultimately a dependent part of the capitalist system. By promoting economic growth and becoming a "partner in production", the workers' movement helped hasten the development of capitalism, which ultimately led to the deindustrialization that made its own identity and strategies irrelevant. The journal illustrates this thesis with the example of workers in post-Yugoslavia who occupy defunct factories. Their actions, which include "hunger strikes, self-mutilations and suicide threats," are seen not as the birth of a new world but as a desperate attempt to hold onto a world that has already vanished.

== Reception and influence ==
Endnotes is known for its distinctive style, which is described as rigorous, dense, and "by turns earnest... bleak... and droll." Its analysis is characterized by its "sober" and "antinormative" stance, avoiding "exhortations, special pleading, and wishful thinking." This approach has been praised for its intellectual seriousness; in 2014, political theorist Perry Anderson called it one of the "most impressive publications to emerge in the Bush-Obama era." It dismisses the possibility of reformist solutions to the crisis of capitalism, such as a "radical Keynesian stimulus", and rejects calls for police reform, arguing that police exist to manage the "ugly realities of a decaying capitalism". This outlook is summarized in the conclusion to one of its essays: "capital runs into crisis at every turn and the working class is forced to wage a struggle for which there is no plausible victory."

In his review of the journal for n+1, Tim Barker argues that this pessimism places Endnotes in a "rigor trap", where its withering analysis of others' political strategies makes it difficult to see how its own revolutionary politics could be workable. Barker notes that the journal's insistence on the unmanageable chaos of capitalist decay can converge with the talking points of the far-right. He contrasts the journal's all-or-nothing approach to revolution with the more strategic orientations of other Marxist thinkers like Robert Brenner and Fredric Jameson, who retain a focus on the agency of the working class or the potential of the state. Barker concludes that while the politics of Endnotes may be "fanciful", its powerful critique poses "challenges that will not be answered easily" for the rest of the left.

== Issues ==
- Endnotes 1: Preliminary Materials for a Balance Sheet of the 20th Century (2008)
- Endnotes 2: Misery and the Value Form (2010)
- Endnotes 3: Gender, Race, Class and Other Misfortunes (2013)
- Endnotes 4: Unity in Separation (2015)
- Endnotes 5: The Passions and the Interests (2019)

== See also ==
- Crisis theory
