= Subsumption =

Subsumption may refer to:

- A minor premise in symbolic logic (see syllogism)
- The Liskov substitution principle in object-oriented programming
- Subtyping in programming language theory
- Subsumption architecture in robotics
- A subsumption relation in category theory, semantic networks and linguistics, also known as a "hyponym-hypernym relationship" (Is-a)
- Subsumption (Marxism), including the concepts of formal and real subsumption
- Theta-subsumption, a decidable entailment relation between clauses
