= Communization =

Contemporary communist theory

Communization is a contemporary communist theory that posits revolution as the immediate abolition of capitalist social relations, including the state, wage labour, and value. Unlike traditional Marxist conceptions which often involve a transitional stage, communization theory holds that a communist society must be created directly through the revolutionary process itself. The theory emerged from left communist currents in France during the 1970s and gained renewed attention in the early 21st century amid the perceived failures of 20th-century revolutionary movements.

Central to communization is the concept of the self-abolition of the proletariat. Instead of the working class affirming its identity to seize power, it must abolish itself as a class as part of the destruction of the capital–labour relationship. Proponents of communization offer a critique of "programmatism"—the strategy of the historical workers' movement which aimed to build power through parties and unions to eventually manage production. Communization theorists argue that historical changes in capitalism, particularly the period of "real subsumption", have made this strategy obsolete.

The theory is not monolithic and encompasses several distinct currents. One tendency, associated with thinkers such as Gilles Dauvé, views communization as an invariant possibility throughout the history of capitalism. A second current, prominently including the group Théorie Communiste and the journal Endnotes, historicises the concept, arguing that communization has only become possible in the current cycle of class struggle. A third tendency, associated with Tiqqun and The Invisible Committee, draws on anarchist and autonomist traditions to advocate for the immediate creation of communist "forms-of-life" through practices such as forming communes and seceding from capitalist society. Critiques of communization theory often focus on its perceived anti-political and anti-strategic nature, questioning how the immediate abolition of existing social forms could be practically coordinated or succeed against organised state power.

== Origins and core concepts ==
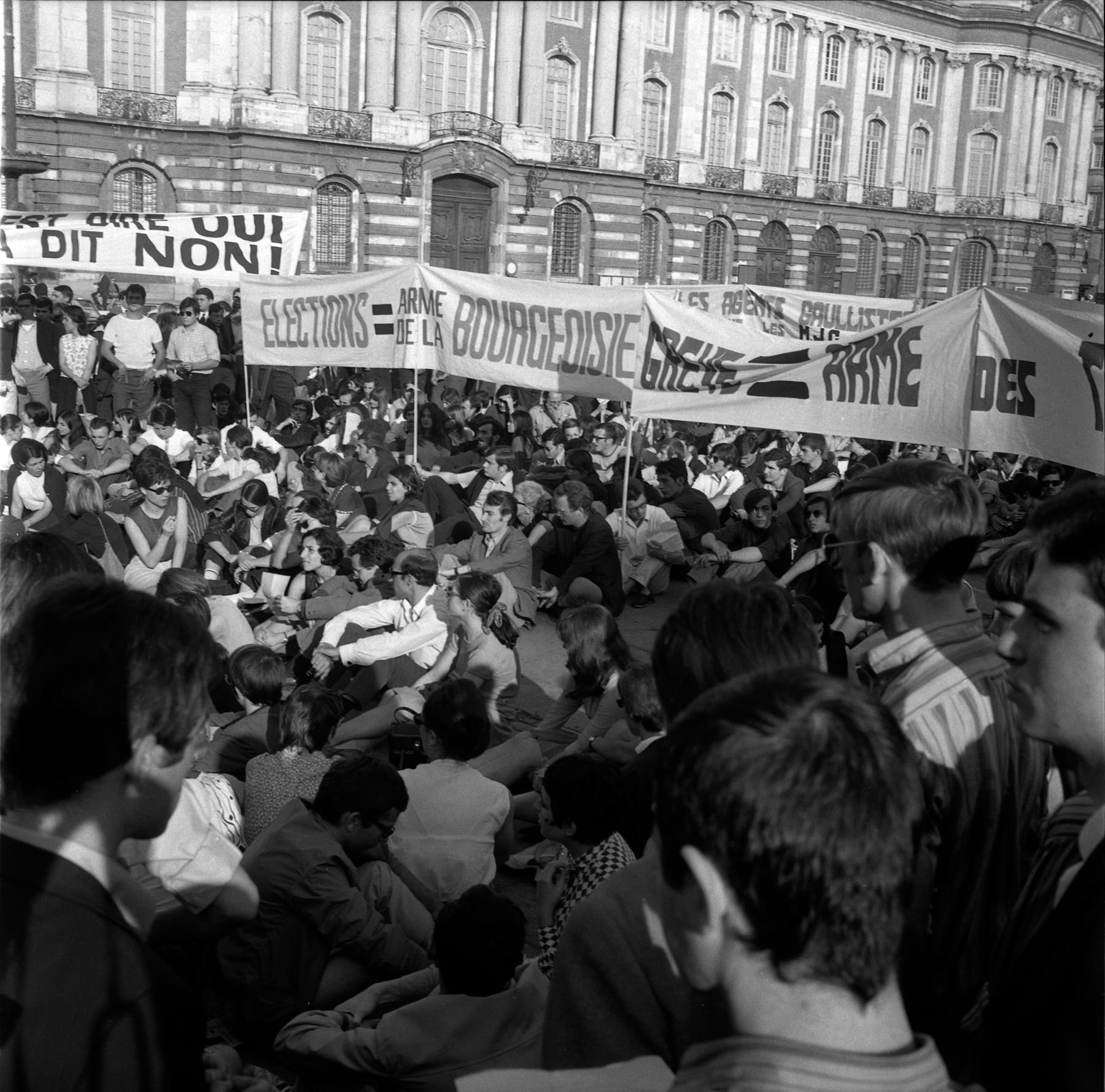
Protest in Toulouse during the events of May 1968 in France. The perceived failure of the uprising prompted a critique of traditional revolutionary strategies within the French ultra-left, from which communization theory emerged.

The concept of "communization" emerged from French ultra-left discussions after the events of May 1968. These discussions were part of an "immanent critique" of council communism developed in response to the perceived failures of the May '68 uprisings. According to Gilles Dauvé, one of the theory's main proponents, the milieu that developed the concept was formed from a variety of left communist traditions, including the legacy of the German-Dutch Left, the Italian Left (Bordigism), and the Situationist International.

Early groups involved in articulating the theory included Invariance, Négation, and Théorie Communiste. This milieu was critical of all forms of "worker-led capitalism" and sought to articulate a vision of revolution that did not involve the proletariat taking over the existing structures of the economy but rather abolishing them entirely. The term was first used in its present sense in the early 1970s by Dominique Blanc to signify communism not as a goal to be achieved after a revolution, but as the very process of the revolution itself. In this view, a revolution is communist only if it immediately begins to dismantle capitalist social forms such as exchange, the division of labour, property, and the state, and replaces them with new, directly social relations.

=== Rejection of the transitional period ===
A foundational principle of communization is the rejection of the idea of a transitional period between capitalism and communism, such as a "workers' state" or "socialism". Historically, Marxist movements conceived of the revolution as a moment in which the proletariat would seize state power, followed by a lengthy phase of transition. During this phase, the working class, as the new ruling class, would use the state and manage production to develop the productive forces and gradually eliminate capitalist elements, eventually leading to a stateless, classless communist society.

Communization theorists argue that this model has historically failed, leading not to communism but to new forms of capitalist management or bureaucratic state power. They contend that as long as core capitalist categories like wage labour, exchange, and value persist, so too will the capital relation, regardless of who is formally in control of the state or the means of production. Dauvé argues that the Leninist conception of transition was concerned solely with "the running of a planned economy" and failed to address the underlying capitalist nature of work and value. Therefore, the revolution must consist of immediate "communizing measures": the direct production of communist social relations and the abolition of the law of value from the outset of the struggle. Instead of a political transition, communization is conceived as an "adverbial theory of communism, in which communism is less a form than a process" of "enchained communist acts that would institute moneyless, stateless, classless reproduction."

=== Critique of programmatism ===
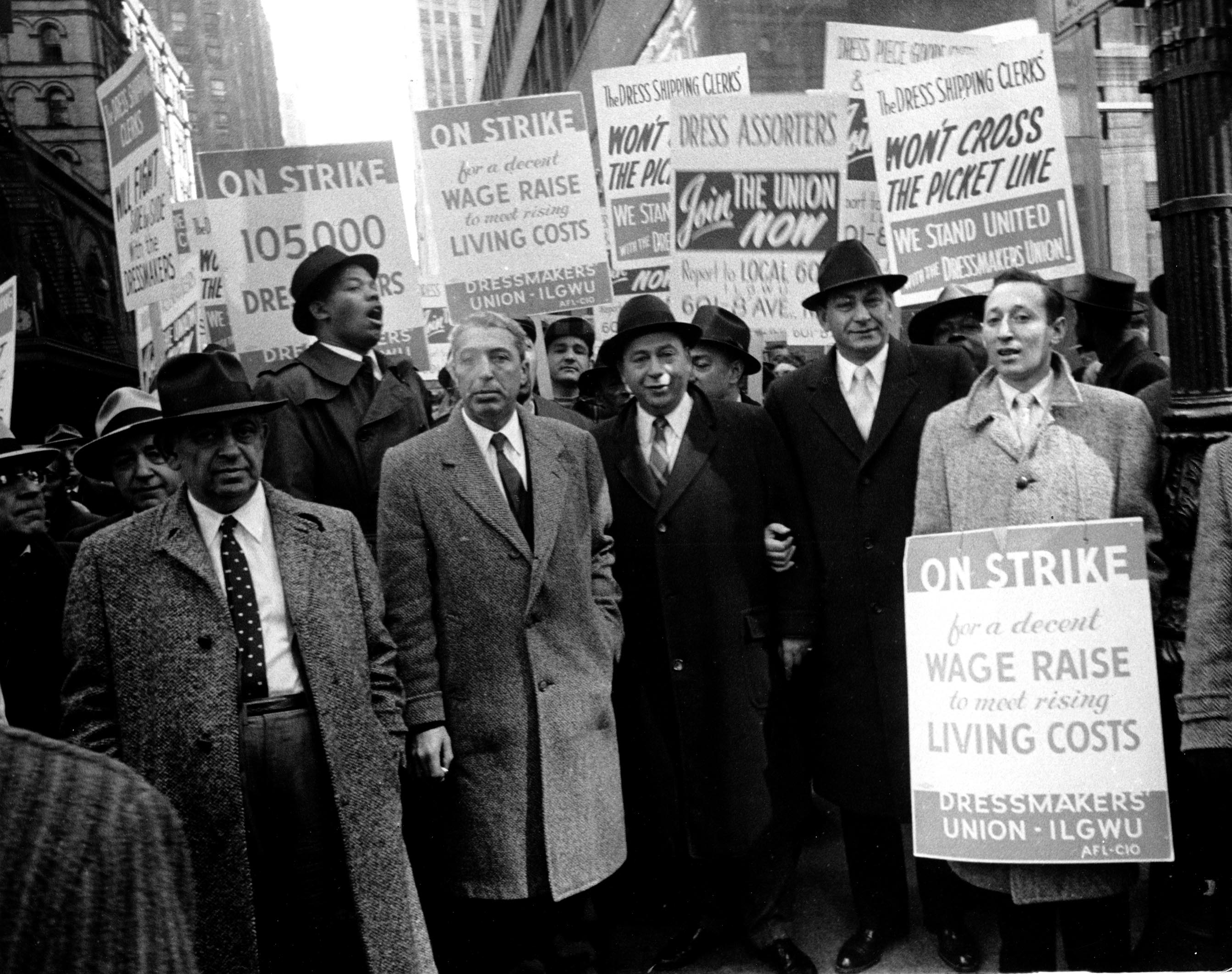
New York City dressmakers on strike in 1958, carrying placards with economic demands. Communization theorists argue the "programmatist" model of affirming worker identity and building power through trade unions is now obsolete.

The concept of "programmatism" was developed by the group Théorie Communiste to describe the dominant paradigm of revolutionary struggle throughout the historical workers' movement of the 19th and 20th centuries. Programmatism is defined by the affirmation of the working class as the agent of revolution. In this model, the proletariat's power grows within capitalism through the development of its organisations (parties, trade unions, councils). The revolution was conceived as the culmination of this build-up of power, where the working class would seize the means of production and make itself the new ruling class. The goal was the "liberation of labour" from the control of the bourgeoisie, with the proletariat taking over and managing the existing productive apparatus.

Communization theorists argue that programmatism entered a terminal crisis in the 1970s. The worldwide wave of struggles in the 1960s and 70s, unlike previous cycles, failed to produce any lasting, mass-based workers' organizations, signalling for Dauvé "the real end of the worker movement as we had known it." The extensive restructuring of capitalism following these struggles dismantled the large factory concentrations and stable worker identities upon which the programmatic workers' movement was based. According to Théorie Communiste, the capital–labour relationship was reconfigured in such a way that the affirmation of a worker's identity no longer represented a threat to capital, but rather became internal to its reproduction. Any affirmation of the proletariat as a class is now simultaneously an affirmation of capital. As a result, the horizon of programmatism has been foreclosed, and a new revolutionary paradigm has emerged in which the proletariat can only act by negating its own existence as a class.

=== Self-abolition of the proletariat ===
Flowing from the critique of programmatism is the central thesis that the revolution must be a process of the self-abolition of the proletariat. Where the workers' movement historically sought to liberate the proletariat, communization holds that the very existence of the proletariat is the problem. The proletariat is not an identity to be affirmed but one pole of the contradictory social relation of capital, which can only be overcome by abolishing both poles: capital and the proletariat itself. Jasper Bernes notes that this concept has deep historical roots in Marxist thought, citing Karl Marx's analysis of the Paris Commune as revealing the problem of a class "that can emancipate itself only by abolishing itself as a class and all classes." In the words of Marx and Friedrich Engels, which Dauvé cites as a core principle, "When the proletariat is victorious, it by no means becomes the absolute side of society, for it is victorious only by abolishing itself and its opposite."

Communization is therefore the process through which proletarians—those who are compelled to sell their labour-power to survive—take immediate measures to abolish the conditions that make them a class. This involves attacking the material forms of their own existence: wage-labour, property, and exchange. The revolution is not made by the proletariat as a positive, self-conscious subject, but emerges from struggles in which acting as a class becomes a limit to the struggles themselves. Théorie Communiste argues that in the current "cycle of struggle", the proletariat's own "class belonging appears as an external constraint", an obstacle that must be overcome. This act of overcoming is the revolution as communization, the dissolution of all classes into a human community of singular individuals.

== Main currents ==
Within the broader current of communization theory, there are significant divergences in how the concept is understood and applied. These differences often centre on the relationship between theory and practice, the historical specificity of communization, and the nature of contemporary struggles. Benjamin Noys identifies a key distinction between tendencies influenced by anarchist prefigurative politics and those adhering to a more historical-materialist Marxist framework.

=== Gilles Dauvé and the invariantist current ===
One of the earliest and most consistent tendencies is associated with Gilles Dauvé and the informal group Troploin (formerly known as La Banquise). This current tends to view communization as a historical invariant, meaning that it has been the essential content of communist revolution since the emergence of the proletariat in the 19th century. From this perspective, past revolutionary failures, such as those in Russia in 1917 or Spain in 1936, were not due to the historical impossibility of communization, but because the proletariat did not or could not carry out the necessary communizing measures to abolish capital in its totality.

Dauvé's synthesis draws on several strands of the communist left. From the German-Dutch Left, it takes the emphasis on revolution as a process of self-activity by the proletariat; from the Italian Left, it takes the focus on the content of communism as the abolition of wage labour, value, and the enterprise; and from the Situationist International, it takes the idea of revolution as the transformation of all aspects of everyday life. For this current, communization is a "creative insurrection" that destroys capitalist social relations by creating new ones. It does not see a fundamental rupture in the nature of capitalism that would make communization possible only today; rather, the contradiction between the proletariat and capital has always carried the possibility of its revolutionary overcoming.

=== Tiqqun and The Invisible Committee ===
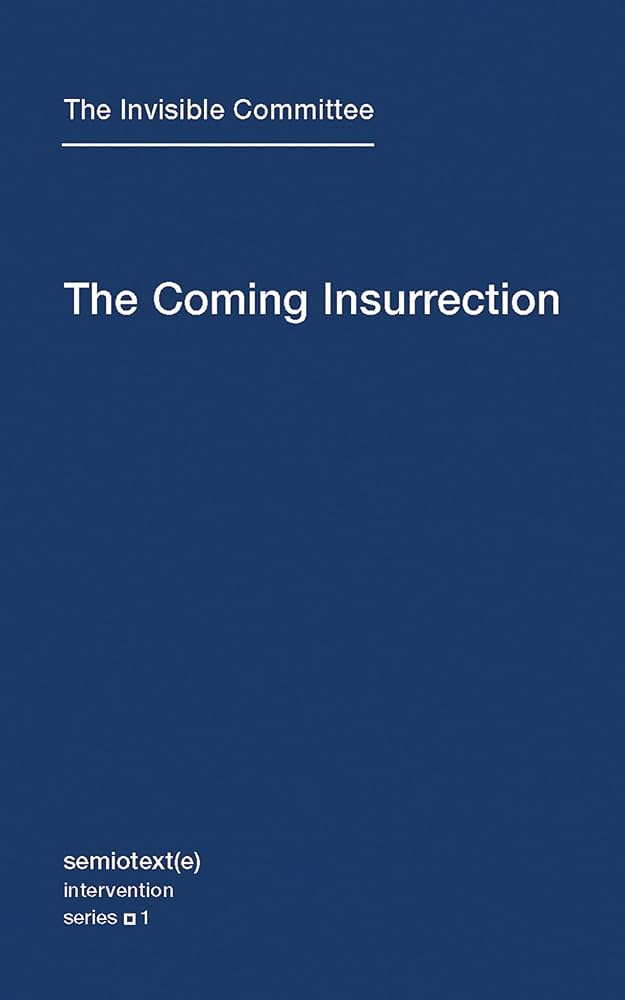
Cover of the English edition of The Coming Insurrection (2007) by The Invisible Committee

One influential tendency is associated with the French journal Tiqqun and the anonymous group The Invisible Committee, author of The Coming Insurrection (2007). This current interprets communization as a practice of immediately creating and inhabiting communist realities in the here and now. Influenced by anarchist prefigurative politics and post-autonomist thought, they advocate for seceding from the dominant institutions of capital and the state by forming communes, developing new "forms-of-life", and building shared material solidarities. For this current, communization involves "making common" spaces, knowledge, and tools, thereby liberating their use from the logic of property.

This perspective is often framed as an ethical and existential project rather than a purely structural or historical one. Revolution is envisioned as the progressive expansion and intensification of these secessionist "worlds" until they constitute a force capable of overthrowing "capitalism, civilization, empire, call it what you wish". Critics within the communization milieu, such as Dauvé, argue that this approach represents a form of "alternativism" that mistakes a "violent but gradual passage" for a revolutionary rupture. He suggests this perspective ignores the centrality of work and production and wrongly assumes that capitalism can be overcome by simply "stepping aside" and withdrawing support. The Endnotes collective argues that this approach misunderstands the totalising nature of capitalist relations. They contend that it is impossible to create genuinely communist "enclaves" within capitalism and that this perspective reduces revolution to a voluntaristic act of "we" who decide to live differently, ignoring the material constraint of the class relation.

=== Théorie Communiste and Endnotes ===
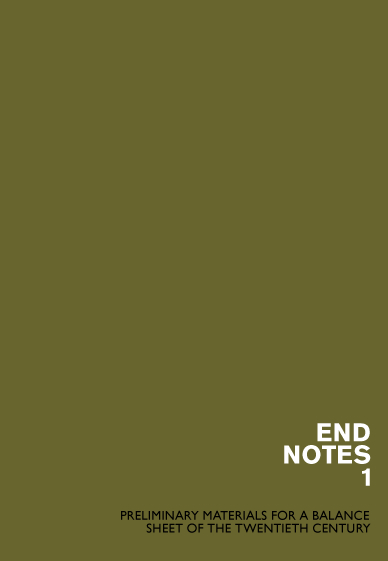
Cover of the first issue of Endnotes, 2008

A contrasting current is represented by the French group Théorie Communiste (TC) and the Anglophone journal Endnotes. This tendency rejects the idea that communization can be prefigured or enacted within capitalism. Instead, they present a historicised theory in which communization is the specific form of revolution unique to the present historical period, which they characterise by the "real subsumption" of labour under capital and the collapse of the programmatic workers' movement.

For this current, communization is not a set of practices to be initiated by militants but the content of a future revolutionary rupture. Contemporary struggles are analysed not as containing "embryos" of communism but as expressing the limits of the current class relation. When struggles such as riots, strikes without demands, and occupations reveal the proletariat's own class identity as a barrier to its actions, they are seen as "negatively prefigurative". They do not build communism, but they indicate the historical impossibility of any other solution to the contradictions of capital besides communism. This perspective insists on the complete immanence of the class relation—there is no "outside" to capital from which to build an alternative. The revolution can only emerge from the contradictions internal to the capital–labour relation itself, as a rupture in its reproduction.

== Relationship to contemporary struggles ==
The renewed interest in communization theory is tied to its attempt to provide a framework for understanding class struggle in the late 20th and early 21st centuries, an era marked by deindustrialisation, the rise of precarity, and the decline of the traditional labour movement. Theorists see the content of contemporary struggles as reflecting the new dynamic of the class relation, in which the self-affirmation of the working class is no longer a viable revolutionary path.

Struggles such as the 2005 French banlieue riots, the 2006 Oaxacan uprising, the 2008 Greek riots, the 2009 California student protests, the Arab Spring, the Occupy movement, the 2011 England riots, Black Lives Matter (BLM), and wildcat strikes are often analysed as examples of this new dynamic. These events are frequently characterised by what theorists identify as a "swerve" (l'écart) within class action: participants act as a class (students, workers, the unemployed) but in a way that calls their own social identity into question. Actions often take the form of riots or blockades rather than organised demands, targeting the sphere of circulation and social reproduction (shops, banks, universities) rather than the point of production. For TC, such struggles are constrained by a "glass floor": they remain in the sphere of reproduction and fail to directly disrupt the production of value in the workplace, thus revealing a key limit of the current cycle. Similarly, Dauvé is critical of movements like Occupy Wall Street, arguing that while their "all-togetherness" is a positive break with atomisation, they ultimately fail to confront the capital–labour relation at its core, instead bypassing the question of production and work.

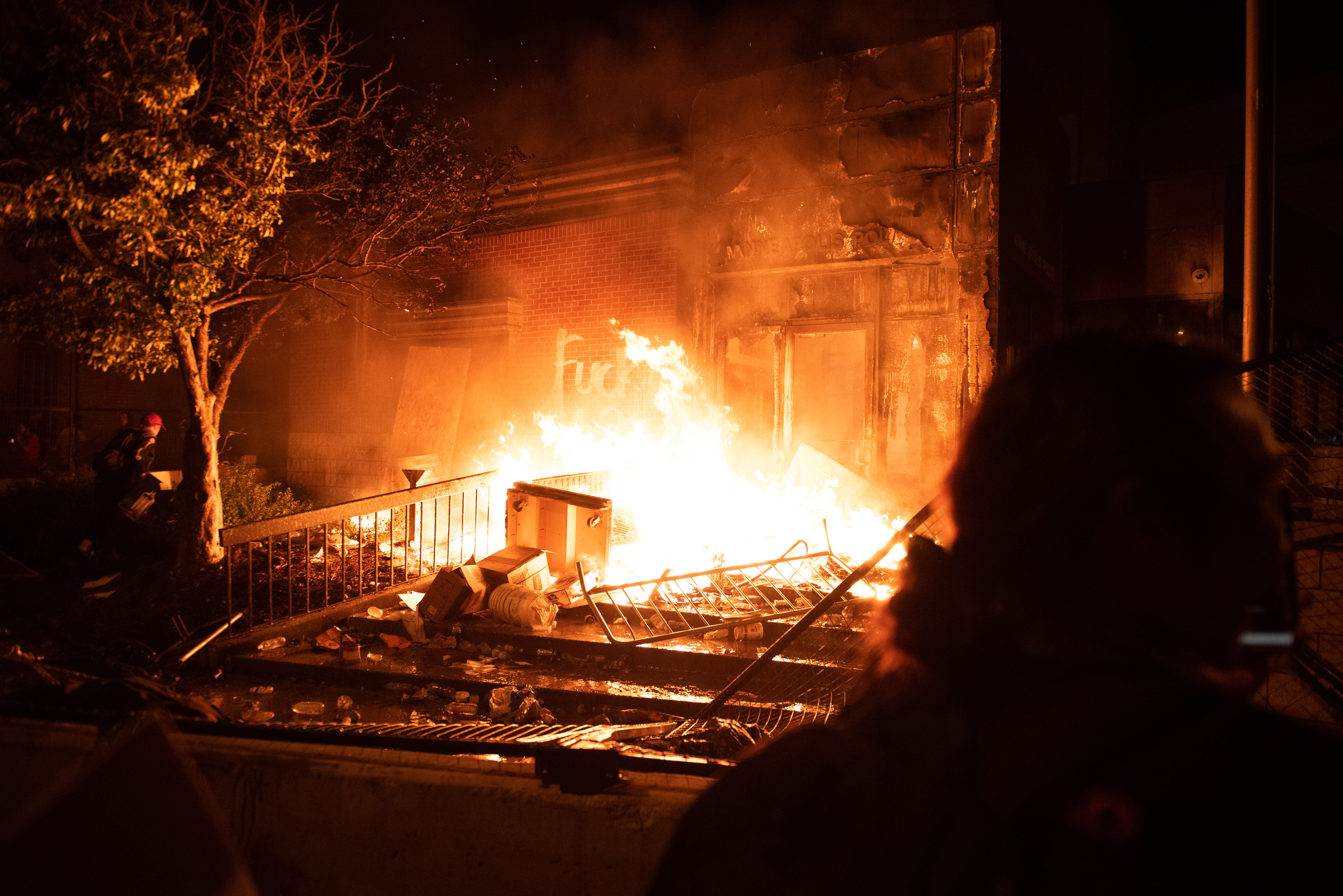
Burning of the Minneapolis Police Department's third precinct station during riots after the murder of George Floyd in 2020

Theorists have applied the concept to interpret the George Floyd uprising in 2020. Jasper Bernes describes the burning of the Minneapolis third police precinct as a "revolutionary example"—a replicable act of insurrectionary reproduction. He argues that the movement's central, though "undetermined," slogan of "abolition" functions as the name for communization in this context. The uprising is seen as exhibiting a struggle "eccentric to production", focusing on circulation and state violence, but raising the question of how such a movement could "penetrate into production".

Communization theory also seeks to address divisions within the proletariat, such as those based on gender, race, and employment status. The abolition of gender is considered an immediate necessity of the revolutionary process, as the gender binary is seen as fundamental to the division of labour and the public/private split that structures capitalist reproduction. Because communization entails the abolition of all social divisions, it must confront gender not as a secondary issue to be resolved "after the revolution" but as a central part of the capitalist totality to be destroyed from the start. As Dauvé puts it, "We will only get rid of work and of the family at the same time." The communization of consumption is seen as a way to overcome the gendered division between paid and unpaid labour by making all forms of reproduction a collective and visible activity.

== Critique and debate ==
The theory of communization has been subject to both internal debates and external critiques, many of which are surveyed in the collection Communization and its Discontents (2011). These criticisms often focus on the theory's abstract nature, its relationship to political practice, and its historical determinism.

A significant internal debate exists between theorists who see communization as a historical invariant—a possibility in any revolutionary struggle against capital—and those, like Théorie Communiste, who argue it is a specific product of the current historical period. Gilles Dauvé criticises the latter position as a form of historical determinism and a "final crisis theory". He argues that TC's "two-stage postulate" (a past era of "programmatism" where revolution was impossible, and a present era where it becomes the sole possibility) is a "Great Simplifier" that wrongly turns the constant, contradictory nature of the proletariat into a succession of historical phases. Dauvé's own position has been critiqued for confusing what Jasper Bernes terms the "test of value" (the abolition of capitalist categories) with the "test of communism" (the creation of a classless society), leading him to wrongly conclude that any system that measures labour time necessarily reproduces value.

More broadly, critics have questioned the lack of strategic and political content in much of communization theory. Alberto Toscano argues that by rejecting the "politics of transition", the theory becomes an "intransitive politics", unable to articulate a concrete strategy for moving from the present to a communist future. This "anti-strategic" stance, he suggests, risks confusing a historical judgment on the failure of past strategies with a theoretical rejection of strategy altogether, leaving no way to think about the practical requirements of organisation, power, and coordination necessary to overcome capital. Benjamin Noys raises similar concerns, pointing to the risk that communization becomes a "valorization of only fleeting moments of revolt" or a minimal "teleology that implies new forms of possible revolution" without specifying how they might come about or cohere.

The theory's emphasis on negation and destruction has also drawn criticism. John Cunningham, while sympathetic to the "affective resonance" of destructive negation, warns against an "aestheticization of destruction" that is disconnected from the practical capacity to institute such measures. Evan Calder Williams questions the focus on "the commons" in some related tendencies, arguing that communism should be understood not as the recovery or defense of a common essence, but as the development of the contradictions of capital, which has rendered everything "banal" by making it formally commensurable through value. The task, he suggests, is to move beyond the "dull embers" of the banal commons. Dauvé has also warned that the theory has become fashionable and co-opted in some academic and political circles, where a critique of "worker identity" is transformed into a broader embrace of identity politics that dilutes the central role of class and the capital–labour relationship.

== See also ==
- Post-Marxism
