= Gilles Dauvé =

French writer and theorist (born 1947)

- Born: 1947 (age 78–79)
- Other name: Jean Barrot
- Occupations: Political theorist; writer; translator
- Known for: Left communism, communization theory

Gilles Dauvé (French: [dove]; born 1947), also known as Jean Barrot, is a French writer and theorist associated with the ultra-left and the current of left communism. His work involves a synthesis of different traditions, primarily the German-Dutch Left (including council communism), the Italian Left (associated with Amadeo Bordiga), and the Situationist International. He is a central figure in the development of the theory of communization, which conceives of communist revolution not as the establishment of a transitional society but as the immediate abolition of capitalist social relations, including wage labour, exchange value, and the state.

Dauvé's thought is organised around a critique of "socialist orthodoxy"—both the electoral path of social democracy and the revolutionary model of Leninism—arguing that both ultimately remain within the logic of capitalism. His intellectual trajectory has been divided into three main periods, reflecting shifts in the political climate from the late 1960s to the present, and includes significant reconsiderations of his earlier positions on determinism and democracy. Within the communization current, Dauvé's work, particularly with the journal Troploin, has been characterized as representing an "invariant-humanist" perspective, a position that has been the subject of debate with other theorists such as Théorie Communiste.

== Intellectual background ==
Dauvé's thought originates in left communism, an intellectual and political current that combines elements of Marxism and anarchism. Left communism is defined primarily by its rejection of what it terms "socialist orthodoxy". This includes the electoral, parliamentary strategy of Western social democratic parties, which left communists argue resulted in "social capitalism", and the Leninist model of revolutionary conquest of power, which they contend terminated in "state capitalism". For left communists, both of these orthodox forms of socialism remained trapped within capitalist parameters such as the law of value, money, and class, while being statist and authoritarian.

In moving beyond this orthodoxy, the left communist tradition, from which Dauvé emerged, developed several key themes:

- A critique of the Leninist party model as "substitutionist", instead emphasising working-class self-organisation.
- An emphasis on communist consciousness arising from material conditions rather than being brought to the working class by an intellectual vanguard.
- A rejection of the scientific and deterministic aspects of orthodox Marxism, with a corresponding attentiveness to culture, everyday life, and will.
- A focus on popular forms of self-organisation, such as workers' councils and communes, as embodiments of direct democracy that critique alienated political representation.

Dauvé is identified as part of a "fourth, late New-Left generation of left communists" who were politicised in the 1960s and 1970s.

== Intellectual development ==
=== Early syntheses (1969–1979) ===
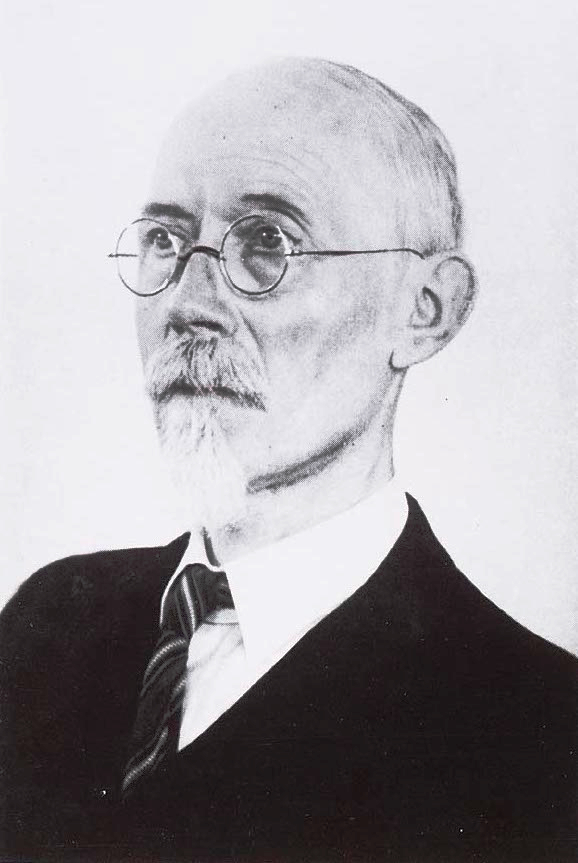
Anton Pannekoek of the German-Dutch Left

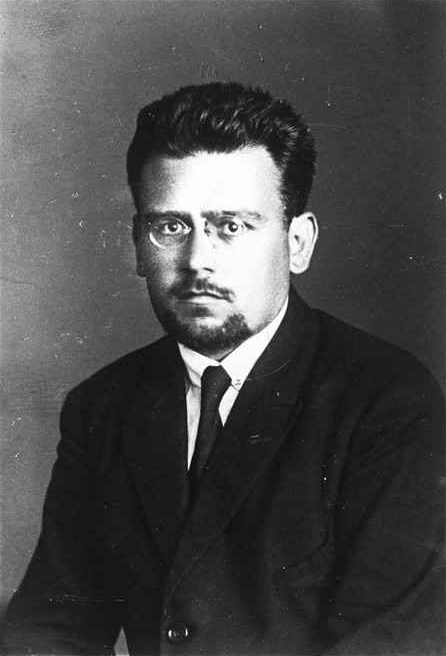
Amadeo Bordiga of the Italian Left

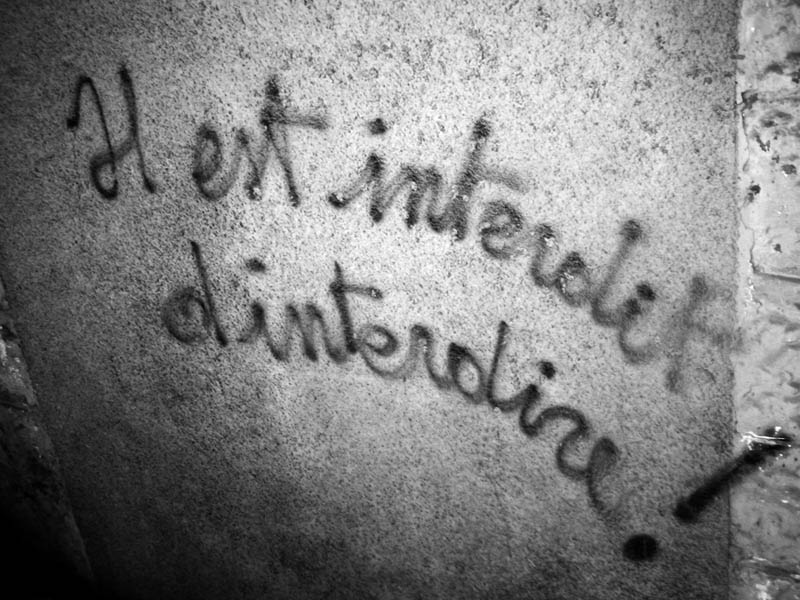
Graffiti inspired by the Situationist International, reading "It is forbidden to forbid!"

In his early work, Dauvé undertook a critical synthesis of various currents within the historic far-left. His project was to bring together the German and Italian communist lefts with insights from more recent groups like the Situationist International (SI) and Socialisme ou Barbarie.

From the German Left, Dauvé adopted a firm rejection of trade unionism, parliamentarism, and what Anton Pannekoek called the "deadly power of nationalism". He viewed unions as facilitating the integration of the working class into capitalism and scorned the party form as a "mediation" that stands between the proletariat and communism, betraying the revolutionary impulse. This position informed his critique of "Kautskyism-Leninism", which he described as a "by-product of Kautskyism" that denies working-class power in favour of the party and ultimately fuses with "state capital, administered by a totalitarian bureaucracy".

Dauvé tempered the German Left's legacy with a critique drawn from the Italian Left, particularly Amadeo Bordiga. He rejected the German Left's tendency to fetishise workers' councils and democracy. Following Bordiga, Dauvé argued against the individualist premises of democracy, viewing it as a "weapon of capital" that, like dictatorship, serves to manage society. For Dauvé, councilism's focus on the form of organization risked "preserving capitalist 'content' while swapping out the form of management". Communism, in this view, is antipolitical and communal, aiming to re-establish the "human community" rather than instituting a different form of political rule. He emphasised the importance of the content of revolution (the transformation of social relations) over its form (workers' power or self-management), criticising any form of communism that retained the law of value. However, Dauvé also criticised the Italian Left for its own fetishism of the party form.

From the Situationist International, Dauvé took the idea of a "unitary critique" of all social relations, insisting on the total transformation of everyday life. At the same time, he was critical of the SI's idealism, particularly its concept of the "spectacle", which he argued was an insufficient analysis of capital, and its tendency toward a "reformism of everyday life". It was during this period that Dauvé began to articulate his vision of revolution as "communization"—the immediate self-movement of workers to abolish exchange value and the state.

=== The "Crisis of Marxism" (1980–1999) ===
During a period marked by the "demoralization and retreat" of French Marxism and the rise of neoliberalism, Dauvé continued to develop his synthesis, working with the periodicals La Banquise (1983–1986) and Le Brise Glace (1988–1990). He critiqued the ascendant discourse of human rights, drawing on Marx's critique of rights and the Bordigist emphasis on community over individualism. In the 1983 text For a World Without Moral Order, he and his co-authors called for a "revolutionary anthropology" that would explore everyday life, sexuality, and instinct as avenues for deep social change.

A central and contentious line of thought from this period was his exploration of the relationship between fascism and democracy. Following Bordiga, Dauvé rejected the distinction between the two, arguing they were merely different forms of managing capital. He contended that democracy often prepared the ground for fascism and that antifascism created a false choice that obscured the systemic violence of capitalism. This led him to provocatively call antifascism the "worst product" of fascism, arguing that it served to defend liberal democracy and prevent a more radical critique of capital itself. During this time, Dauvé and his associates found themselves embroiled in a scandal around Holocaust revisionism, or negationism.

=== Reconsiderations and the "New Global Left" (1999–present) ===
From the late 1990s, in a new political climate shaped by the alter-globalization movement, Dauvé engaged in a series of important reconsiderations, largely under the banner of the group and journal Troploin. He distanced himself from Marxist determinism, the notion of "laws of history", and progressivism, writing that "Marx's late vision remained hampered by capitalist pictures of the future." This shift included questioning his earlier explanation of the Soviet Union's state capitalism as a result of "unripe historical conditions" and warning against catastrophist modes of thought that posit a direct link between economic crisis and revolutionary action. Significantly, he revised his earlier equation of fascism and democracy, stating that "nobody can seriously equate democracy and dictatorship, nor democracy and fascism".

In this period, Dauvé's work showed a greater openness to anarchism and integrated elements of Italian autonomism, particularly its focus on the radical questioning of work. In his analysis of contemporary capitalism, he argued against theorists like Antonio Negri who emphasise historical breaks, instead stressing the continuities of capital's logic. He saw developments like deindustrialisation and the casualisation of labour as part of a "bourgeois counteroffensive" rather than a fundamental transformation of capitalism. He also identified major ideological shifts, such as the "fall of work as an idol" and the emergence of a "dreamless capitalism" lacking the grand unifying narratives of the past. While acknowledging the increase in contestation, he remained critical of the contemporary left's focus on "autonomy", viewing it as a defensive and limited political horizon.

A key aspect of this period was the theoretical debate between Dauvé's group, Troploin (with Karl Nesic), and the French group Théorie Communiste (TC). This debate, documented in the first issue of the journal Endnotes, highlights a major fault line within the communization current. Dauvé's position has been described as an "invariant-humanist" perspective, which posits communization as an immanent possibility in struggles throughout the history of capitalism. In contrast, TC argues for a "historical-anti-humanist" perspective, contending that communization only becomes a real possibility in the current cycle of struggles following the crisis of the workers' movement and the completion of capital's real subsumption of society. TC has also criticized what they see as a "voluntarist strain" in Dauvé's theory of communization.

== Communization theory ==
Dauvé is a central figure in the development of the theory of communization, a term he has used since the mid-1970s, drawing it from French neo-Bordigist circles. This concept is foundational to his work and represents the culmination of his synthesis of left-communist traditions. For Dauvé, "communism is not as an ideal to be realized: it already exists, not as a society, but as an effort, a task to prepare for".

Communization theory posits revolution not as a transition period (like the dictatorship of the proletariat) but as a process that immediately begins to produce communist social relations. A revolution is only communist, in this view, "if it changes all social relationships into communist relationships". This involves the simultaneous destruction of the state, wage labour, and the proletariat's own existence as a class. Dauvé's conception of communization emphasizes its radically destructive character. As he puts it, communization "does not take the old material bases as it finds them: it overthrows them". This means a complete rupture with all elements of capital, including the productive apparatus, without a transitional 'workers' state'. The revolutionary process is itself communism, an immediate negation of all capitalist social relations. It is an activity that aims to "break all separations" and get rid of the "mediations which, at present, serve society by linking individuals among them: money, the state, value, classes, etc."

This rejection of mediation extends to political forms. In line with Dauvé's long-standing critiques, communization theory is suspicious of the party, unions, and even direct democracy as practised in general assemblies, which are seen as formal structures that can block the fluid, immediate creation of "fraternal social relations". Instead, the focus is on the immediate content of struggles such as riots, occupations, and insurrections as potential sites for communizing measures.

== Influence and significance ==
According to Chamsy el-Ojeili and Dylan Taylor, Dauvé has played a "leading role in forging a unique Marxian current built from important but still relatively neglected traditions across the Far Left", most notably the German-Dutch and Bordigist traditions. His intellectual journey is seen as paralleling that of the broader European Left: from the "flowering of imaginative and emancipatory Leftist currents in the 1960s and 1970s", through the "retreat from utopia of the 1980s and much of the 1990s", to the "reinvigoration of the Left beginning in the late 1990s". His work resonates with an older far-left tradition that sought an alternative to both social democracy and Leninism, aiming for a socialism that would "emerge from below, distant from parliamentary and vanguard party politics". El-Ojeili and Taylor conclude that Dauvé, as a "figure of the vanishing anthropological type, the Far-Left 'extremist' pamphleteer", is "worthy of serious attention from those working in the history of ideas, from Marxist to anarchist to autonomist scholars".

== Bibliography ==
=== In English ===
- Eclipse and Re-emergence of the Communist Movement Jean Barrot et François Martin (alias de François Cerutti), Black & Red Press (Detroit, Michigan), 1974
- The Communist Left in Germany 1918-1921, with Denis Authier, 1976
- , 1979
- and the S.I.? (originally published in La Banquise, no. 4, 1986)
- The Perplexities of the Middle Eastern Conflict
- Grey September (on the issues raised after September 11, 2001, with Carasso and Nesic)
- Back to the Situationist International
- From Crisis to Communisation (PM Press, 2019)

=== In French ===
- Jean Barrot, Le Mouvement communiste, Champ Libre, 1972
- Jean Barrot, Communisme et question russe, La Tête de feuilles, 1972
- Jean Barrot, La Gauche communiste en Allemagne, 1918-1921, Payot, 1976
- Jean Barrot, Bilan, Contre-révolution en Espagne 1936-1939, Paris, U.G.E. 10/18, 1979 ( téléchargeable cf. liens externes)
- Collectif, Libertaires et « ultra-gauche » contre le négationnisme, préf. Gilles Perrault, ill. Tony Johannot, contributions de Pierre Rabcor, François-Georges Lavacquerie, Serge Quadruppani, Gilles Dauvé, en annexe : Les Ennemis de nos ennemis ne sont pas forcément nos amis (mai 1992), Paris, Réflex, 1996
- Gilles Dauvé, Banlieue molle, HB Éditions, 1997
- Gilles Dauvé, Quand meurent les Insurrections, ADEL, 1999
- Denis Authier, Gilles Dauvé, Ni parlement, ni syndicats: Les conseils ouvriers!, Les Nuits rouges, 2003
- Gilles Dauvé, Karl Nesic, Au-delà de la démocratie, L'Harmattan, 2009
