= Leninism =

Political theory developed by Vladimir Lenin

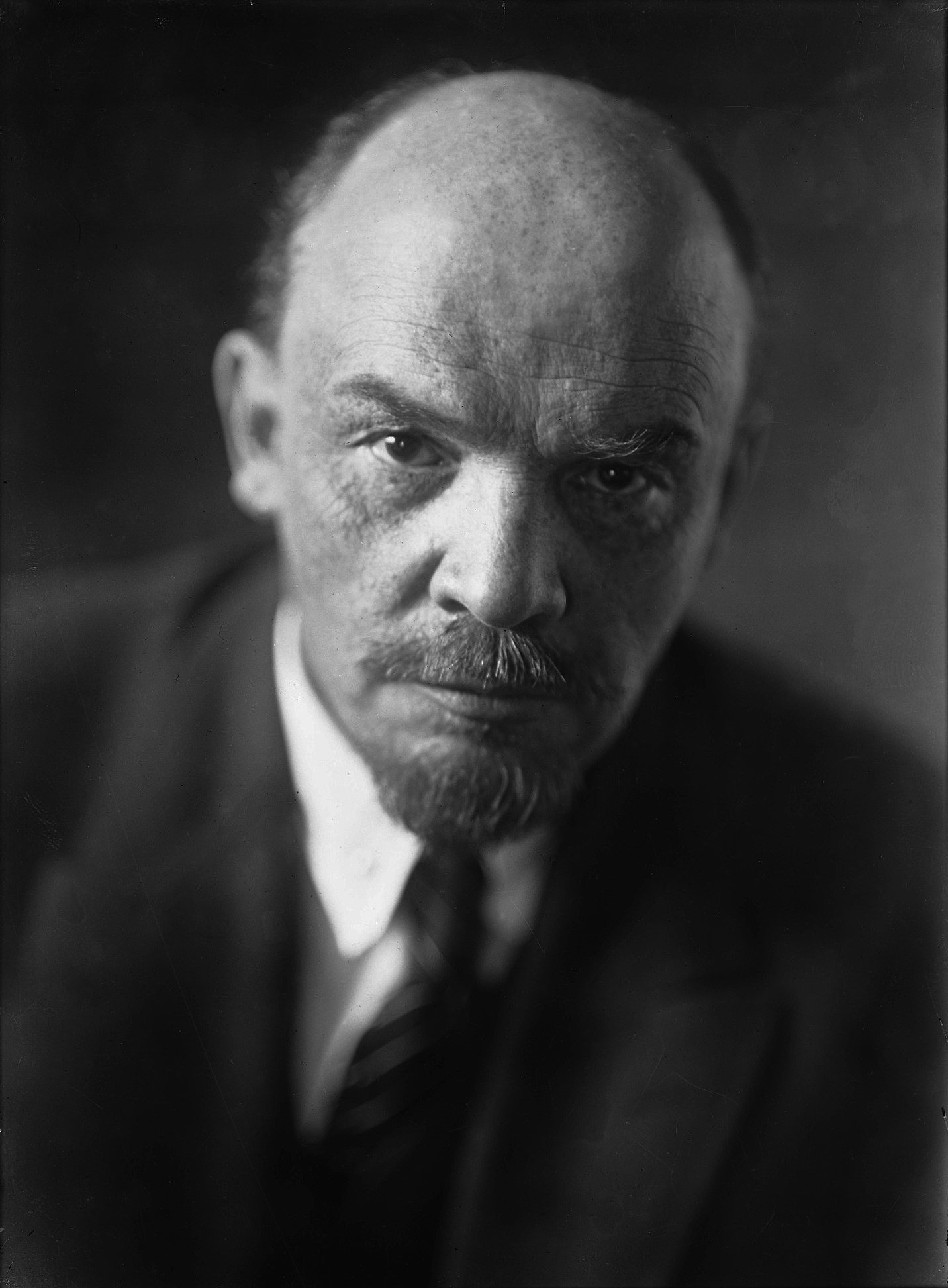
Vladimir Lenin, after whom Leninism is named

Leninism (Russian: Ленинизм, Leninizm) is a political ideology developed by Russian Marxist revolutionary Vladimir Lenin that proposes the establishment of the dictatorship of the proletariat led by a revolutionary vanguard party as the political prelude to the establishment of communism. Lenin's ideological contributions to the Marxist ideology relate to his theories on the party, imperialism, the state, and revolution. The function of the Leninist vanguard party was to provide the working classes with the political consciousness (education and organisation) and revolutionary leadership necessary to depose capitalism in the Russian Empire (1721–1917).

Leninist revolutionary leadership is based upon The Communist Manifesto (1848), identifying the communist party as "the most advanced and resolute section of the working class parties of every country; that section which pushes forward all others." As the vanguard party, the Bolsheviks viewed history through the theoretical framework of historical materialism, which sanctioned political commitment to the successful overthrow of capitalism, and then to instituting socialism; and, as the revolutionary national government, to realise the socio-economic transition by all means.

In the aftermath of the October Revolution (1917), Leninism was the dominant version of Marxism in Russia and the basis of soviet democracy, the rule of directly elected soviets. In establishing the socialist mode of production in Bolshevik Russia—with the Decree on Land (1917), war communism (1918–1921), and the New Economic Policy (1921–1928)—the revolutionary régime suppressed most political opposition, including Marxists who opposed Lenin's actions, the anarchists and the Mensheviks, factions of the Socialist Revolutionary Party and the Left Socialist-Revolutionaries. The Russian Civil War (1917–1922), which included the seventeen-army Allied intervention in the Russian Civil War (1917–1925), and left-wing uprisings against the Bolsheviks (1918–1924), was an external and internal war which transformed Bolshevik Russia into the Russian Socialist Federative Soviet Republic (RSFSR), the core republic of the Union of Soviet Socialist Republics (USSR).

As revolutionary praxis, Leninism originally was neither a proper philosophy nor a discrete political theory. Leninism comprises politico-economic developments of orthodox Marxism and Lenin's interpretations of Marxism, which function as a pragmatic synthesis for practical application to the actual conditions (political, social, economic) of the post-emancipation agrarian society of Imperial Russia in the early 20th century. As a political-science term, Lenin's theory of proletarian revolution entered common usage at the fifth congress of the Communist International (1924), when Grigory Zinoviev applied the term Leninism to denote "vanguard-party revolution." Leninism was accepted as part of CPSU's vocabulary and doctrine around 1922, and in January 1923, despite objections from Lenin, it entered the public vocabulary.

== Historical background ==
In the 19th century, Karl Marx and Friedrich Engels wrote the Manifesto of the Communist Party (1848), in which they called for the political unification of the European working classes in order to achieve communist revolution; and proposed that because the socio-economic organisation of communism was of a higher form than that of capitalism, a workers' revolution first would occur in the industrialised countries. In Germany, Marxist social democracy was the political perspective of the Social Democratic Party of Germany, inspiring Russian Marxists, such as Lenin.

In the early 20th century, the socio-economic backwardness of Imperial Russia (1721–1917) — characterized by combined and uneven economic development — facilitated rapid and intensive industrialisation, which produced a united, working-class proletariat in a predominantly agrarian society. Moreover, because industrialisation was financed chiefly with foreign capital, Imperial Russia did not possess a revolutionary bourgeoisie with political and economic influence upon the workers and the peasants, as had been the case in the French Revolution (1789–1799) in the 18th century. Although Russia's political economy was agrarian and semi-feudal, the task of democratic revolution fell to the urban, industrial working class as the only social class capable of effecting land reform and democratisation, in view that the Russian bourgeoisie would suppress any revolution.

In the April Theses (1917), the political strategy of the October Revolution (7–8 November 1917), Lenin proposed that the Russian revolution was not an isolated national event but a fundamentally international event—the first socialist revolution in the world. Lenin's practical application of Marxism and proletarian revolution to the social, political, and economic conditions of agrarian Russia motivated and impelled the "revolutionary nationalism of the poor" to depose the absolute monarchy of the three-hundred-year dynasty of the House of Romanov (1613–1917), as tsars of Russia.

=== Imperialism ===
In Imperialism, the Highest Stage of Capitalism (1916), Lenin's economic analyses indicated that capitalism would transform into a global financial system, by which industrialised countries exported financial capital to their colonies and so realise the exploitation of the labour of the natives and the exploitation of the natural resources of their countries. Such superexploitation allows wealthy countries to maintain a domestic labour aristocracy with a slightly higher standard of living than most workers, ensuring peaceful labour–capital relations in the capitalist homeland. Therefore, a proletarian revolution of workers and peasants could not occur in capitalist countries whilst the imperialist global-finance system remained in place. The first proletarian revolution would have to occur in an underdeveloped country, such as Imperial Russia, the politically weakest country in the capitalist global-finance system in the early 20th century. In the United States of Europe Slogan (1915), Lenin wrote:

Workers of the world, unite!—Uneven economic and political development is an absolute law of capitalism. Hence the victory of socialism is possible, first in several, or even in one capitalist country taken separately. The victorious proletariat of that country, having expropriated the capitalists and organised its own socialist production, would stand up against the rest of the world, the capitalist world.

— Collected Works, vol. 18, p. 232

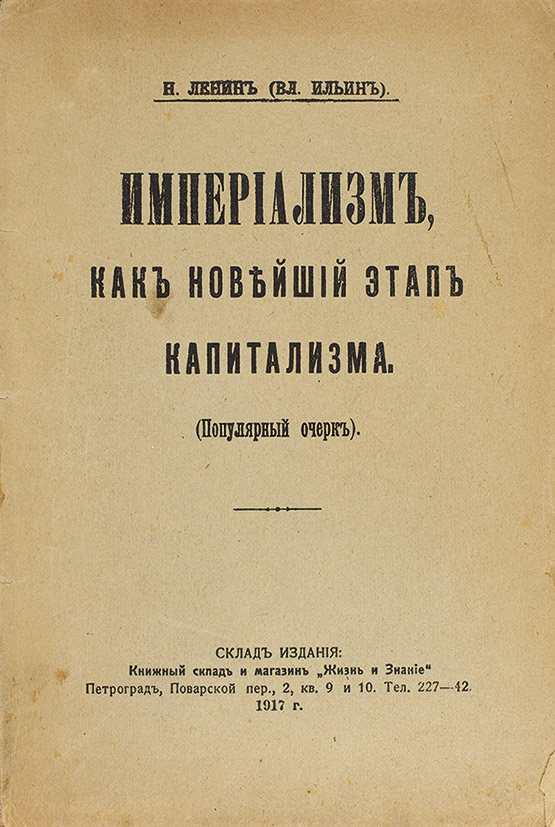
First edition Russian cover of Lenin's 1917 book Imperialism, the Newest Stage of Capitalism

In "Left-Wing" Communism: An Infantile Disorder (1920), Lenin wrote:

The more powerful enemy can be vanquished only by exerting the utmost effort, and by the most thorough, careful, attentive, skillful and obligatory use of any, even the smallest, rift between the enemies, any conflict of interests among the bourgeoisie of the various countries and among the various groups or types of bourgeoisie within the various countries, and also by taking advantage of any, even the smallest, opportunity of winning a mass ally, even though this ally is temporary, vacillating, unstable, unreliable and conditional. Those who do not understand this reveal a failure to understand even the smallest grain of Marxism, of modern scientific socialism in general. Those who have not proved in practice, over a fairly considerable period of time and in fairly varied political situations, their ability to apply this truth in practice have not yet learned to help the revolutionary class in its struggle to emancipate all toiling humanity from the exploiters. And this applies equally to the period before and after the proletariat has won political power.

— Collected Works, vol. 31, p. 23

== Leninist praxis ==
=== Vanguard party ===
In Chapter II, "Proletarians and Communists", of The Communist Manifesto (1848), Marx and Engels present the communist party as the political vanguard solely qualified to lead the proletariat in revolution:

The Communists, therefore, are, on the one hand, practically the most advanced and resolute section of the working-class parties of every country, that section which pushes forward all others; on the other hand, theoretically, they have over the great mass of the proletariat the advantage of clearly understanding the lines of march, the conditions, and the ultimate general results of the proletarian movement. The immediate aim of the Communists is the same as that of all other proletarian parties: Formation of the proletariat into a class, overthrow of the bourgeois supremacy, conquest of political power by the proletariat.

The revolutionary purpose of the Leninist vanguard party is to establish the dictatorship of the proletariat with the working class's support. The communist party would lead the popular deposition of the Tsarist government and then transfer government power to the working class; that change of the ruling class—from the bourgeoisie to the proletariat—makes establishing socialism possible. In What Is To Be Done? (1902), Lenin said that a revolutionary vanguard party, recruited from the working class, should lead the political campaign because only in that way would the proletariat successfully realise their revolution; unlike the economic campaign of trade-union-struggle advocated by other socialist political parties and the anarcho-syndicalists. Like Marx, Lenin distinguished between the aspects of a revolution, the "economic campaign" (labour strikes for increased wages and work concessions) that featured diffused plural leadership; and the "political campaign" (socialist changes to society), which required the decisive, revolutionary leadership of the Bolshevik vanguard party.

==== Democratic centralism ====
Based upon the First International (IWA, International Workingmen's Association, 1864–1876), Lenin organised the Bolsheviks as a democratically centralised vanguard party; wherein free political speech was recognised as legitimate until policy consensus; afterwards, every member of the party was expected to abide by the agreed policy. Democratic debate was Bolshevik practice, even after Lenin banned factions among the Party in 1921. Despite being a guiding political influence, Lenin did not exercise absolute power and continually debated to have his points of view accepted as a course of revolutionary action. In Freedom to Criticise and Unity of Action (1905), Lenin said:

Of course, the application of this principle in practice will sometimes give rise to disputes and misunderstandings; but only on the basis of this principle can all disputes and all misunderstandings be settled honourably for the Party. ... The principle of democratic centralism and autonomy for local Party organisations implies universal and full freedom to criticise, so long as this does not disturb the unity of a definite action; it rules out all criticism which disrupts or makes difficult the unity of an action decided on by the Party.

==== Proletarian revolution ====
Before the October Revolution, despite supporting moderate political reform—including Bolsheviks elected to the Duma when opportune—Lenin said that capitalism could only be overthrown with proletarian revolution, not with gradual reforms—from within (Fabianism) and from without (social democracy)—which would fail because the bourgeoisie's control of the means of production determined the nature of political power in Russia. As epitomised in the slogan "For a Democratic Dictatorship of the Proletariat and Peasantry", a proletarian revolution in underdeveloped Russia required a united proletariat (peasants and industrial workers) to assume government power in the cities successfully. Moreover, owing to the middle-class aspirations of much of the peasantry, Leon Trotsky said that the proletarian leadership of the revolution would ensure truly socialist and democratic socio-economic change.

=== Dictatorship of the proletariat ===
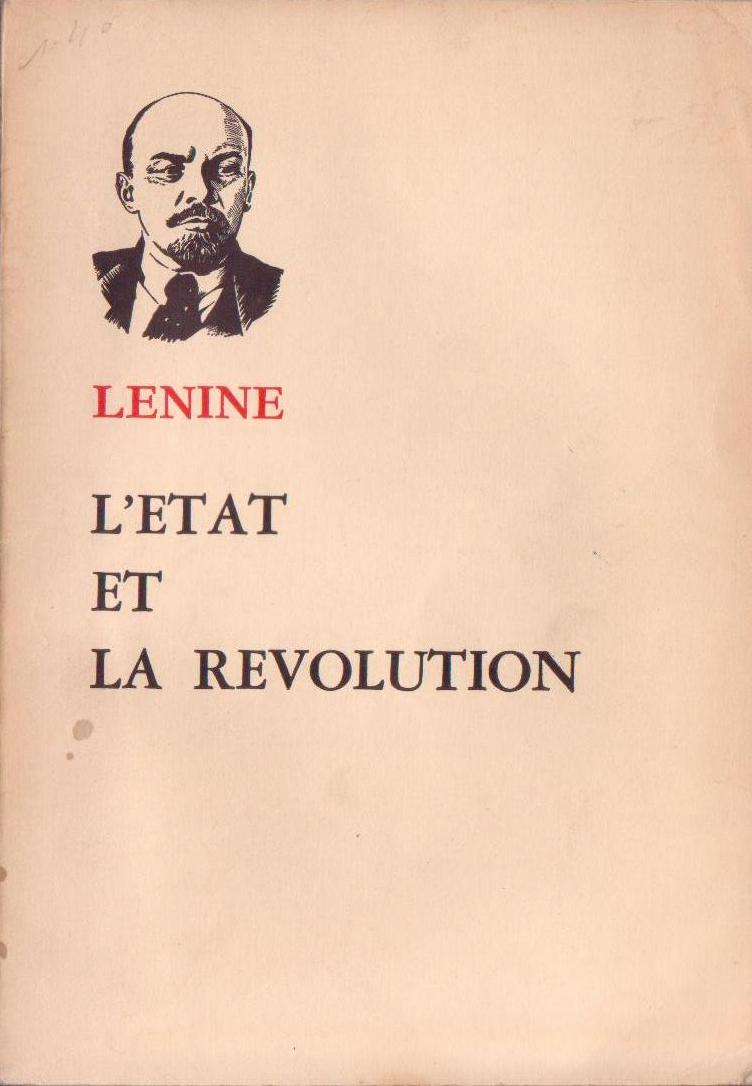
1970 French edition of Lenin's 1917 book The State and Revolution

In Bolshevik Russia, government by direct democracy was realised and effected by the soviets (elected councils of workers), which Lenin said was the "democratic dictatorship of the proletariat" postulated in orthodox Marxism. The soviets comprised representative committees from the factories and the trade unions but excluded the capitalist social class to establish a proletarian government by and for the working class and the peasants. Concerning the political disenfranchisement of the capitalist social class in Bolshevik Russia, Lenin said that "depriving the exploiters of the franchise is a purely Russian question, and not a question of the dictatorship of the proletariat, in general. ... In which countries ...democracy for the exploiters will be, in one or another form, restricted ...is a question of the specific national features of this or that capitalism." In chapter five of The State and Revolution (1917), Lenin describes the dictatorship of the proletariat as:

the organisation of the vanguard of the oppressed as the ruling class for the purpose of crushing the oppressors. ... An immense expansion of democracy, which, for the first time, becomes democracy for the poor, democracy for the people, and not democracy for the rich ... and suppression by force, i.e. exclusion from democracy, for the exploiters and oppressors of the people—this is the change which democracy undergoes during the 'transition' from capitalism to communism.

Concerning the disenfranchisement from democracy of the capitalist social class, Lenin said: "Democracy for the vast majority of the people, and suppression by force, i.e. exclusion from democracy, of the exploiters and oppressors of the people—this is the change democracy undergoes during the transition from capitalism to communism." The dictatorship of the proletariat was effected with soviet constitutionalism, a form of government opposite to the dictatorship of capital (privately owned means of production) practised in bourgeois democracies. Under soviet constitutionalism, the Leninist vanguard party would be one of many political parties competing for election to government power. Nevertheless, because of the Russian Civil War (1917–1924) and the anti-Bolshevik terrorism of opposing political parties aiding the White Armies' counter-revolution, the Bolshevik government banned all other political parties, which left the Leninist vanguard party as the only political party in Russia. Lenin said that such political suppression was not philosophically inherent to the dictatorship of the proletariat.

=== Economics ===
The Bolshevik government nationalised industry and established a foreign-trade monopoly to allow the productive coordination of the national economy and so prevent Russian national industries from competing against each other. To feed the populaces of town and country, Lenin instituted war communism (1918–1921) as a necessary condition—adequate supplies of food and weapons—for fighting the Russian Civil War. In March 1921, the New Economic Policy (NEP, 1921–1929) allowed limited local capitalism (private commerce and internal free trade) and replaced grain requisitions with an agricultural tax managed by state banks. The NEP was meant to resolve food-shortage riots by the peasantry and allowed limited private enterprise; the profit motive encouraged farmers to produce the crops required to feed town and country; and to economically re-establish the urban working class, who had lost many workers to fight the counter-revolutionary Civil War. The NEP nationalisation of the economy then would facilitate the industrialisation of Russia, politically strengthen the working class, and raise the standards of living for all Russians. Lenin said that the appearance of new socialist states was necessary for strengthening Russia's economy in establishing Russian socialism. Lenin's socio-economic perspective was supported by the German Revolution of 1918–1919, the Italian insurrection and general strikes of 1920, and worker wage-riots in the UK, France, and the US.

=== National self-determination ===
In recognising and accepting nationalism among oppressed peoples, Lenin advocated their national right to self-determination and so opposed Russian chauvinism because such ethnocentrism was a cultural obstacle to establishing the dictatorship of the proletariat in every territory of the deposed Russian Empire (1721–1917). In The Right of Nations to Self-determination (1914), Lenin said:

We fight against the privileges and violence of the oppressor nation, and do not in any way condone strivings for privileges on the part of the oppressed nation. :... The bourgeois nationalism of any oppressed nation has a general democratic content that is directed against oppression, and it is this content that we unconditionally support. At the same time, we strictly distinguish it from the tendency towards national exclusiveness. ... Can a nation be free if it oppresses other nations? It cannot.

In this polemic against Rosa Luxemburg, Lenin also defended his position on national liberation, arguing that Russia was going through a bourgeois-democratic phase that necessitated the formation of nation states.

The socialist internationalism of Marxism and Bolshevism is based upon class struggle and a people's transcending nationalism, ethnocentrism, and religion—the intellectual obstacles to progressive class consciousness—which are the cultural status quo that the capitalist ruling class manipulates in order to divide the working classes and the peasant classes politically. To overcome that barrier to establishing socialism, Lenin said that acknowledging nationalism, as a people's right of self-determination and right of secession, naturally would allow socialist states to transcend the political limitations of nationalism to form a federation. In The Question of Nationalities, or 'Autonomisation' (1923), Lenin said:

[N]othing holds up the development and strengthening of proletarian class solidarity so much as national injustice; "offended" nationals are not sensitive to anything, so much as to the feeling of equality, and the violation of this equality, if only through negligence or jest – to the violation of that equality by their proletarian comrades.

=== Socialist culture ===
The role of the Leninist vanguard party was to politically educate the workers and peasants to dispel the societal false consciousness of religion and nationalism that constitute the cultural status quo taught by the bourgeoisie to the proletariat to facilitate their economic exploitation of peasants and workers. Influenced by Lenin, the Central Committee of the Bolshevik Party stated that the development of the socialist workers' culture should not be "hamstrung from above" and opposed the Proletkult (1917–1925) organisational control of the national culture.

== Leninism after 1924 ==
=== Stalinism and Marxism–Leninism ===
In post-Revolutionary Russia, the Stalinist application of Marxism–Leninism (socialism in one country), and Trotskyism (permanent world revolution) were the principal philosophies of communism that claimed legitimate ideological descent from Leninism; thus, within the Communist Party, each ideological faction denied the political legitimacy of the opposing faction. Until shortly before his death, Lenin countered Stalin's disproportionate political influence in the Communist Party and the bureaucracy of the Soviet government, partly because of abuses he had committed against the populace of Georgia and partly because the autocratic Stalin had accumulated administrative power disproportionate to his office of General Secretary of the Communist Party.

The counter-action against Stalin aligned with Lenin's advocacy of the right of self-determination for the national and ethnic groups of the deposed Tsarist Empire. Lenin warned the Party that Stalin had "unlimited authority concentrated in his hands, and I am not sure whether he will always be capable of using that authority with sufficient caution" and formed a faction with Leon Trotsky to remove Stalin as the General Secretary of the Communist Party.

To that end followed proposals reducing the administrative powers of party posts to reduce bureaucratic influence upon the policies of the Communist Party. Lenin advised Trotsky to emphasise Stalin's recent bureaucratic alignment in such matters (e.g. undermining the anti-bureaucratic workers' and peasants' Inspection) and argued to depose Stalin as General Secretary. Despite advice to refuse "any rotten compromise", he did not heed Lenin's advice and General Secretary Stalin retained power over the Communist Party and the bureaucracy of the Soviet government.

=== Trotskyism ===
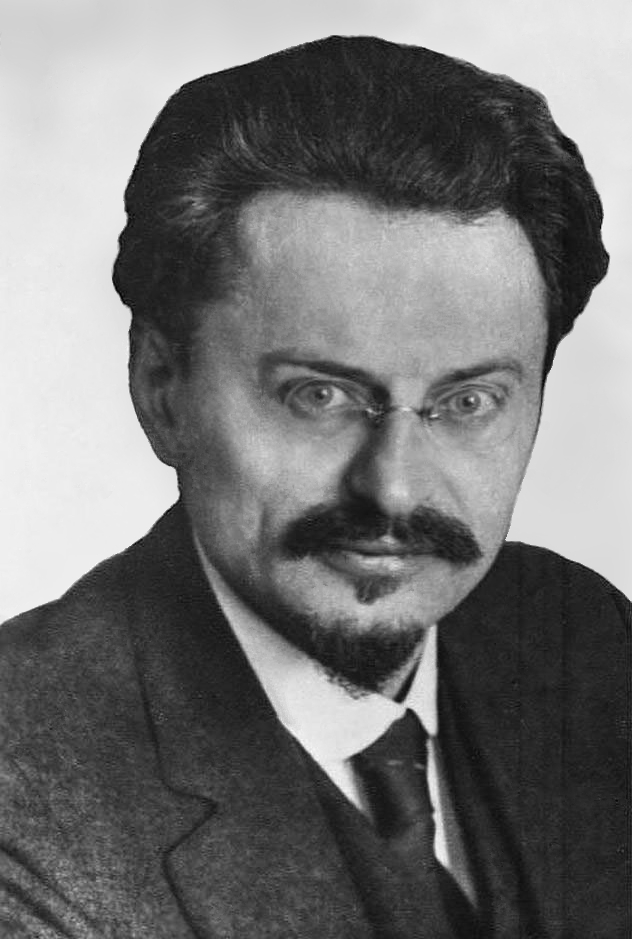
Leon Trotsky was exiled from Russia after losing to Stalin in the factional politics of the Bolsheviks.

In 1922, Lenin allied with Leon Trotsky against the party's growing bureaucratisation and the influence of Joseph Stalin. Lenin himself never mentioned the concept of "Trotskyism" after Trotsky became a member of the Bolshevik party but the term was employed by Stalin and the troika to present Trotsky's views as factional and anathematical to Leninist thought.

After Lenin's death (21 January 1924), Trotsky ideologically battled the influence of Stalin, who formed ruling blocs within the Russian Communist Party (with Grigory Zinoviev and Lev Kamenev, then with Nikolai Bukharin and then by himself) and so determined soviet government policy from 1924 onwards. The ruling blocs continually denied Stalin's opponents the right to organise as an opposition faction within the party—thus, the reinstatement of democratic centralism and free speech within the Communist Party were key arguments of Trotsky's Left Opposition and the later Joint Opposition.

In instituting government policy, Stalin promoted the doctrine of socialism in one country (adopted 1925), wherein the Soviet Union would establish socialism upon Russia's economic foundations (and support socialist revolutions elsewhere). In a 1936 interview with journalist Roy W. Howard, Stalin articulated his rejection of world revolution and stated that “We never had such plans and intentions” and that “The export of revolution is nonsense”.

Conversely, Trotsky held that socialism in one country would economically constrain the industrial development of the Soviet Union and thus required assistance from the new socialist countries in the developed world—which was essential for maintaining soviet democracy—in 1924, much undermined by the Russian Civil War of White Army counter-revolution. Trotsky's theory of permanent revolution proposed that socialist revolutions in underdeveloped countries would further dismantle feudal régimes and establish socialist democracies that would not pass through a capitalist stage of development and government. Hence, revolutionary workers should ally politically with peasant political organisations, not capitalist political parties. In contrast, Stalin and his allies proposed that alliances with capitalist political parties were essential to realising a revolution where communists were too few. Said Stalinist practice failed, especially in the Northern Expedition, which resulted in the right-wing Kuomintang's massacre of the Chinese Communist Party. Despite the failure, Stalin's policy of mixed-ideology political alliances nonetheless became Comintern's policy.

Until exiled from Russia in 1929, Trotsky developed and led the Left Opposition (and the later Joint Opposition) with members of the Workers' Opposition, the Decembrists and (later) the Zinovievists. Trotskyism predominated the politics of the Left Opposition, which demanded the restoration of soviet democracy, the expansion of democratic centralism in the Communist Party, national industrialisation, international permanent revolution and socialist internationalism. According to historian Sheila Fitzpatrick, the scholarly consensus was that Stalin appropriated the position of the Left Opposition on such matters as industrialisation and collectivisation.

The Trotskyist demands countered Stalin's political dominance of the Communist Party, which was officially characterised by the "cult of Lenin", the rejection of permanent revolution, and advocated the doctrine of socialism in one country. The Stalinist economic policy vacillated between appeasing the capitalist interests of the kulak in the countryside and destroying them as a social class. Initially, the Stalinists also rejected the national industrialisation of Russia but then pursued it in full, sometimes brutally. In both cases, the Left Opposition denounced the regressive nature of Stalin's policy towards the wealthy kulak social class and the brutality of forced industrialisation. Trotsky described Stalinist vacillation as a symptom of the undemocratic nature of a ruling bureaucracy.

During the 1920s and the 1930s, Stalin fought and defeated the political influence of Trotsky and the Trotskyists in Russia using slander, antisemitism, censorship, expulsions, exile (internal and external), and imprisonment. The anti-Trotsky campaign culminated in the executions (official and unofficial) of the Moscow Trials (1936–1938), which were part of the Great Purge of Old Bolsheviks who had led the Revolution.

== Criticism ==
Criticism of Leninism's economics has been wide-ranging from the political left and the right.

=== 20th century criticism ===
John Maynard Keynes wrote in his essay on persuasion in 1931 on Leninism:

"I cannot perceive that Russian Communism has made any contribution to our economic problems of intellectual interest or scientific value. I do not think that it contains, or is likely to contain, any piece of useful economic technique which we could not apply, if we chose, with equal or greater success in a society which retained all the marks, I will not say of nineteenth-century individualistic capitalism, but of British bourgeois ideals. Theoretically at least, I do not believe that there is any economic improvement for which Revolution is a necessary instrument. On the other hand, we have everything to lose by the methods of violent change. In Western industrial conditions the tactics of Red Revolution would throw the whole population into a pit of poverty and death."

Noam Chomsky interviewed in 2013 noted the outcome of Leninism:

"When he became the leader, he didn’t waste much time, and Trotsky helped him, in instituting a pretty repressive regime with the basic elements of Stalinism. They moved pretty quickly to dismantle most of the organs of popular power. Not over night, but over a short time they were able to basically dismantle the soviets, the factory councils, to convert the labor force into a labor army. The peasant revolutionary forces were very much opposed to this incidentally. As distinct from Marx who saw revolutionary potential in the Russian peasantry, the urban communists, like Lenin were strongly opposed to that."

=== Left-wing criticism ===
As a form of Marxism, revolutionary Leninism was criticised as an undemocratic interpretation of socialism. In The Nationalities Question in the Russian Revolution (1918), Rosa Luxemburg criticised the Bolsheviks for the suppression of the All Russian Constituent Assembly (January 1918); the partitioning of the feudal estates to the peasant communes; and the right of self-determination of every national people of the Russias. That the strategic (geopolitical) mistakes of the Bolsheviks would create significant dangers for the Russian Revolution, such as the bureaucratisation that would arise to administrate the large country that was Bolshevik Russia. In Marxist philosophy, left communism is a range of left-wing political perspectives among communists. Left communism criticizes the Bolshevik Party's ideology as the revolutionary vanguard. Ideologically, left communists present their perspectives and approaches as authentic Marxism and thus more oriented to the proletariat than the Leninism of the Communist International at their first (1919) and second (1920) congresses. Proponents of left communism include Amadeo Bordiga, Herman Gorter, Paul Mattick, Sylvia Pankhurst, Antonie Pannekoek and Otto Rühle.

Historically, the Dutch-German communist left has been most critical of Lenin and Leninism, yet the Italian communist left remained Leninist. Bordiga said: "All this work of demolishing opportunism and 'deviationism' (Lenin: What Is To Be Done?) is today the basis of party activity. The party follows revolutionary tradition and experiences in this work during these periods of revolutionary reflux and the proliferation of opportunist theories, which had as their violent and inflexible opponents Marx, Engels, Lenin, and the Italian Left." In The Lenin Legend (1935), Paul Mattick said that the council communist tradition, begun by the Dutch-German leftists, also is critical of Leninism. Contemporary left-communist organisations, such as the Internationalist Communist Tendency and the International Communist Current, view Lenin as an essential and influential theorist but remain critical of Leninism as political praxis for the proletarian revolution.

Nonetheless, the Bordigism of the International Communist Party abides Bordiga's strict Leninism. Ideologically aligned with the Dutch-German left, among the ideologists of contemporary communisation, the theorist Gilles Dauvé criticised Leninism as a "by-product of Kautskyism". In The Soviet Union Versus Socialism (1986), Noam Chomsky said that Stalinism was the logical development of Leninism and not an ideological deviation from Lenin's policies, which resulted in collectivisation enforced with a police state. He also argued, in light of the tenets of socialism, Leninism was a right-wing deviation from Marxism.

== Legacy ==
=== Debated influence on Stalinism ===
Some historians such as Richard Pipes consider Stalinism as the natural consequence of Leninism, that Stalin "faithfully implemented Lenin's domestic and foreign policy programs". Robert Service notes that "institutionally and ideologically Lenin laid the foundations for a Stalin ... but the passage from Leninism to the worse terrors of Stalinism was not smooth and inevitable." Historian and Stalin biographer Edvard Radzinsky believes that Stalin was a genuine follower of Lenin, exactly as he claimed himself. Proponents of continuity cite a variety of contributory factors, in that it was Lenin, rather than Stalin, whose civil war measures introduced the Red Terror with its hostage-taking and internment camps; that it was Lenin who developed the infamous Article 58 and who established the autocratic system within the Russian Communist Party. Proponents also note that Lenin put a ban on factions within the party and introduced the one-party state in 1921, a move that enabled Stalin to get rid of his rivals easily after Lenin's death and cite Felix Dzerzhinsky, who exclaimed during the Bolshevik struggle against opponents in the Russian Civil War: "We stand for organized terror—this should be frankly stated."

Other scholars have had a differing view and attributed the establishment of the one-party system in the Soviet Union to the wartime conditions imposed on Lenin's government and others have highlighted the initial attempts to form a coalition government with the Left Socialist Revolutionaries. According to historian Marcel Liebman, Lenin's wartime measures such as banning opposition parties was prompted by the fact that several political parties either started armed uprisings against the new Soviet government, or participated in sabotage, collaborated with the deposed Tsarists, or made assassination attempts against Lenin and other Bolshevik leaders. Liebman also argued that the banning of parties under Lenin did not have the same repressive character as later bans enforced under the Stalinist regime. Several scholars have highlighted the socially progressive nature of Lenin's policies such as universal education, universal healthcare and equal rights for women. Conversely, Stalin's regime reversed Lenin's policies on social matters such as sexual equality, legal restrictions on marriage, rights of sexual minorities and protective legislation. Historian Robert Vincent Daniels also viewed the Stalinist period as a counter-revolution in Soviet cultural life which revived patriotic propaganda, the Tsarist programme of Russification and traditional, military ranks which had been criticized by Lenin as expressions of "Great Russian chauvinism". Daniels also regarded Stalinism to represent an abrupt break with the Leninist period in terms of economic policies in which a deliberated, scientific system of economic planning that featured former Menshevik economists at Gosplan had been replaced with a hasty version of planning with unrealistic targets, bureaucratic waste, bottlenecks and shortages.

Revisionist historians and some post–Cold War and otherwise dissident Soviet historians, including Roy Medvedev, argue that "one could list the various measures carried out by Stalin that were actually a continuation of anti-democratic trends and measures implemented under Lenin", but that "in so many ways, Stalin acted, not in line with Lenin's clear instructions, but in defiance of them." In doing so, some historians have tried to distance Stalinism from Leninism to undermine the totalitarian view that the negative facets of Stalin were inherent in communism from the start. Critics include anti-Stalinist communists such as Leon Trotsky, who pointed out that Lenin attempted to persuade the Russian Communist Party to remove Stalin from his post as its General Secretary. Lenin's Testament, the document which contained this order, was suppressed after Lenin's death. Trotsky also argued that he and Lenin had intended to lift the ban on the opposition parties such as the Mensheviks and Socialist Revolutionaries as soon as the economic and social conditions of Soviet Russia had improved. Various historians have cited Lenin's proposal to appoint Trotsky as a Vice-chairman of the Soviet Union as evidence that he intended Trotsky to be his successor as head of government. In his biography of Trotsky, Polish-British historian Isaac Deutscher says that, on being faced with the evidence, "only the blind and the deaf could be unaware of the contrast between Stalinism and Leninism." According to Stalin's secretary, Boris Bazhanov, Stalin was jubilant over Lenin's death while “publicly putting on the mask of grief”. French historian Pierre Broue disputed the historical assessments of the early Soviet Union by modern historians such as Dmitri Volkogonov in which he argued had falsely equated Leninism, Stalinism and Trotskyism to present the notion of ideological continuity and reinforce the position of counter-communism. Other revisionist historians, such as Orlando Figes, whilst critical of the Soviet era, acknowledge that Lenin had actively sought to counter the growing influence of Stalin through a number of actions such as his alliance with Trotsky in 1922–23, opposition to Stalin on foreign trade, the Georgian affair and proposed party reforms which included the democratisation of the Central Committee and recruitment of 50–100 ordinary workers into the lower organs of the party.

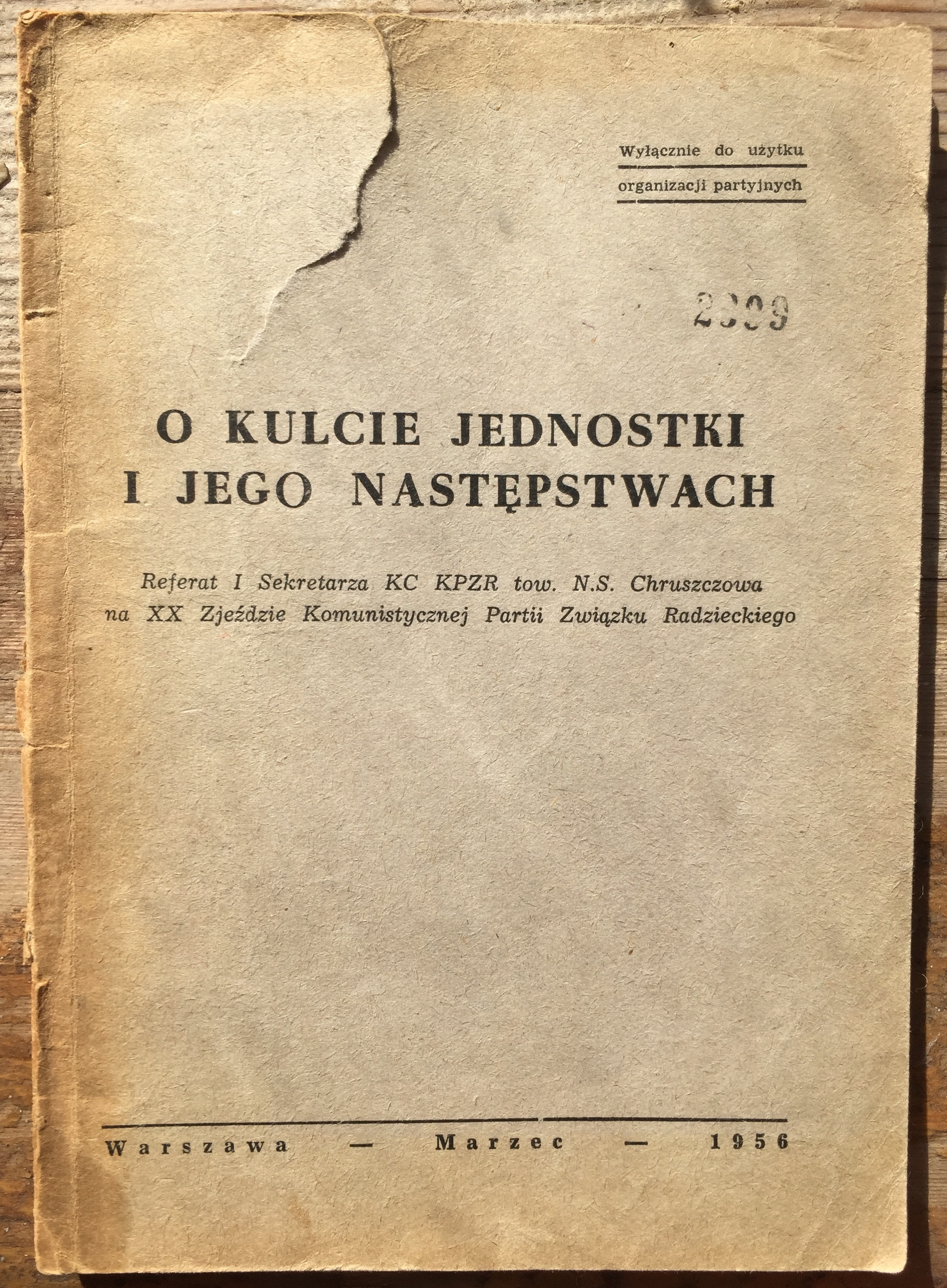
O kulcie jednostki i jego następstwach, Warsaw, March 1956, first edition of the Secret Speech, published for the inner use in the PUWP

Nikita Khrushchev, Stalin's successor, argued that Stalin's regime differed profusely from the leadership of Lenin in his "Secret Speech", delivered in 1956. He was critical of the cult of the individual which was constructed around Stalin whereas Lenin stressed “the role of the people as the creator of history”. He also emphasized that Lenin favored a collective leadership which relied on personal persuasion and recommended the removal of Stalin from the position of General Secretary. Khrushchev contrasted this with the “despotism” of Stalin which require absolute submission to his position and he also highlighted that many of the people who were later annihilated as “enemies of the party", "had worked with Lenin during his life”. He also contrasted the “severe methods” used by Lenin in the “most necessary cases” as a “struggle for survival” during the Civil War with the extreme methods and mass repressions used by Stalin even when the Revolution was “already victorious”. In his memoirs, Khrushchev argued that Stalin's widespread purges of the "most advanced nucleus of people" among the Old Bolsheviks and leading figures in the military and scientific fields had "undoubtedly" weakened the nation.

Some Marxist theoreticians have disputed the view that the Stalinist dictatorship was a natural outgrowth of the Bolsheviks' actions as most of the original central committee members from 1917 were later eliminated by Stalin. George Novack stressed the initial efforts by the Bolsheviks to form a government with the Left Socialist Revolutionaries and bring other parties such as the Mensheviks into political legality. Tony Cliff argued the Bolshevik-Left Socialist Revolutionary coalition government dissolved the democratically elected Russian Constituent Assembly due to a number of reasons. They cited the outdated voter-rolls which did not acknowledge the split among the Socialist Revolutionary party and the assemblies conflict with the Russian Congress of the Soviets as an alternative democratic structure.

A similar analysis is present in more recent works such as those of Graeme Gill, who argues that "[Stalinism was] not a natural flow-on of earlier developments; [it formed a] sharp break resulting from conscious decisions by leading political actors." However, Gill notes that "difficulties with the use of the term reflect problems with the concept of Stalinism itself. The major difficulty is a lack of agreement about what should constitute Stalinism." Revisionist historians such as Sheila Fitzpatrick have criticized the focus on the upper levels of society and the use of Cold War concepts such as totalitarianism, obscuring the system's reality.

Russian historian Vadim Rogovin stated that "Under Lenin, the freedom to express a real variety of opinions existed in the party, and in carrying out political decisions, consideration was given to the positions of not only the majority, but a minority in the party". He compared this practice with subsequent leadership blocs which violated party tradition, ignored proposals of opponents and expelled the Opposition from the party on falsified charges which culminated with the Moscow Trials of 1936–1938. According to Rogovin, 80-90% of the members of the Central Committee elected at the Sixth through to the Seventeenth Congresses were physically annihilated.

The Right Opposition and Left Opposition have been held by some scholars as representing political alternatives to Stalinism despite their shared beliefs in Leninism due to their policy platforms which were at variance with Stalin. This ranged from areas related to economics, foreign policy and cultural matters.

== See also ==
- Anti-imperialism
- "He who does not work, neither shall he eat"
- Luxemburgism
- National delimitation in the Soviet Union
- Neo-Leninism
- Wars of national liberation
- Yellow socialism
