= Subsumption (Marxism) =

Concept in Marxist theory

In Marxist theory, subsumption is the process by which social relations, particularly the labour process, are progressively brought under the control of the capitalist mode of production. The concept, which originated in the philosophy of Immanuel Kant and Georg Wilhelm Friedrich Hegel, was adapted by Karl Marx to analyze the historical and logical development of capitalism. Marx distinguished between the formal subsumption and the real subsumption of labour under capital, a distinction which has become a foundational element in subsequent Marxist analyses of work, technology, and social control.

Formal subsumption occurs when capital takes control of pre-existing labour processes without fundamentally altering their technological or organizational methods. In this stage, capitalists primarily extract absolute surplus-value by extending the working day or intensifying labour. Real subsumption, by contrast, describes a more advanced stage where the labour process itself is continuously transformed by technology, scientific management, and mechanization to increase productivity. This allows for the extraction of relative surplus-value by lowering the value of labour-power.

Later Marxist thinkers, including the Italian autonomist, Frankfurt School, and Marxist feminist traditions, have expanded the concept beyond the immediate sphere of production. They use it to analyze how other areas of life, such as consumption, culture, communication, and social reproduction (including unpaid domestic labour), become integrated into the logic of capital accumulation, a process sometimes termed "social subsumption". The concept remains a key analytical tool for understanding the expanding and intensifying reach of capitalist social relations.

== Etymology and philosophical background ==
The term subsumption derives from the Latin subsumere, meaning 'to take under' or 'to include in something'. Before its use by Karl Marx, the concept was central in German Idealism, particularly in the works of Immanuel Kant and Georg Wilhelm Friedrich Hegel. The philosophical trajectory of subsumption distinguishes between a "classical" and a "critical" conception of the term. The classical view treats subsumption as a simple act of classification, while the critical view, which developed in modern philosophy, sees it as a productive and often oppressive process that shapes reality itself.

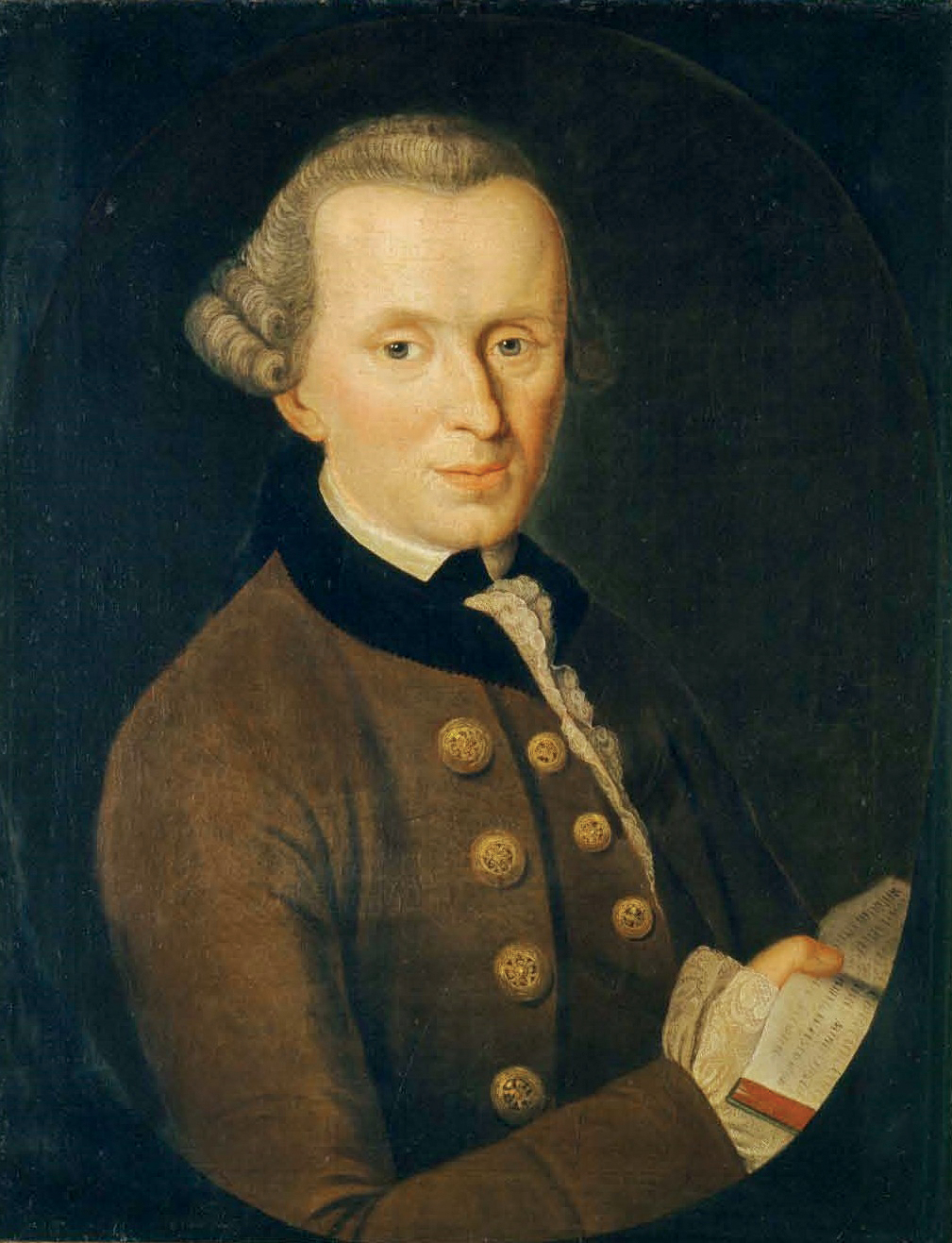
Immanuel Kant

For Kant, subsumption was a fundamental logical procedure of judgment, describing how the mind connects a particular sensory experience (an intuition) with a universal concept. It was the process of "subsuming under rules", or determining whether a specific instance falls under a general category, forming the basis of rational cognition. Kant extended this logical function into a "transcendental" one, where subsumption is not merely about classifying pre-existing objects but is a productive act that constitutes objective experience itself. Through a process of synthesis and schematism, the mind actively shapes sensory data to fit the universal categories of the understanding. In this sense, subsumption becomes a key mechanism in the subjective production of objectivity.

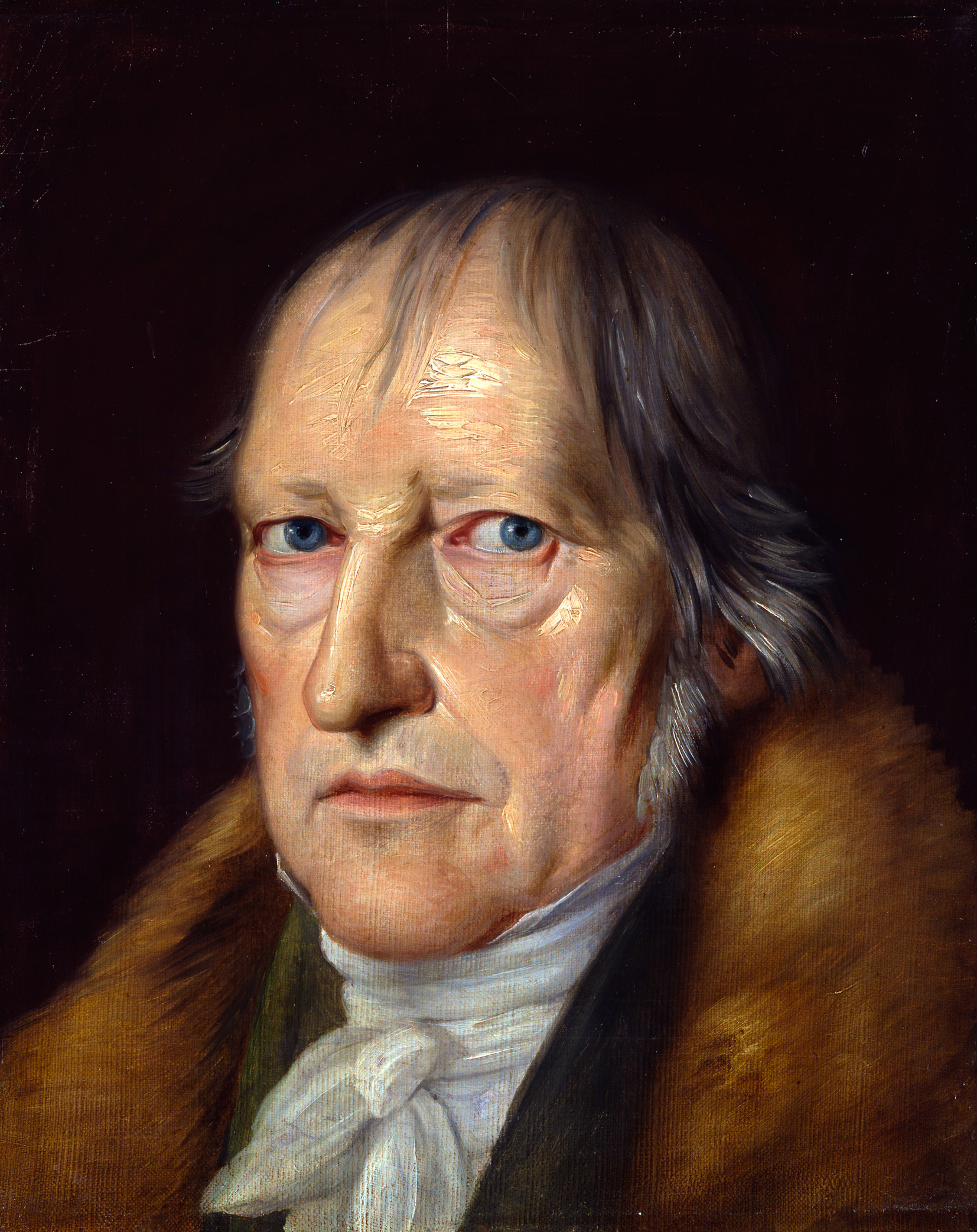
Georg Wilhelm Friedrich Hegel

Hegel developed this idea further, moving it from a purely logical function to a social and dialectical one. He criticized Kant's conception for its static and formal nature, which, in his view, imposed a universal category on a particular from the outside, altering it in the process. In Hegel's philosophy, subsumption describes the mediating process through which particular individuals and social practices are integrated into a general social structure, such as the state or the community. This process is relational, where the particular and the general mutually constitute each other rather than the former being simply absorbed by the latter. Hegel ultimately saw subsumption as a logically insufficient relation, an "unresolved opposition" that must be overcome in a higher dialectical unity.

Marx fused these Kantian and Hegelian traditions into a historical materialist framework. He retained the concept of subordination and logical inclusion but grounded it in the concrete, material relations of production. For Marx, subsumption was not primarily a mental or abstract process but a real, historical one centered on the relationship between labour and capital. He transposed the philosophical critique of reason into a radical critique of society, analysing how the "metabolic" syntheses of social practice, rather than ideal relations, form the basis of social reality. In capitalist society, this takes the form of subsumption under "social forms" or "real abstractions" like value and capital, which constitute the "logic of the body politic".

== Marx's theory of subsumption ==
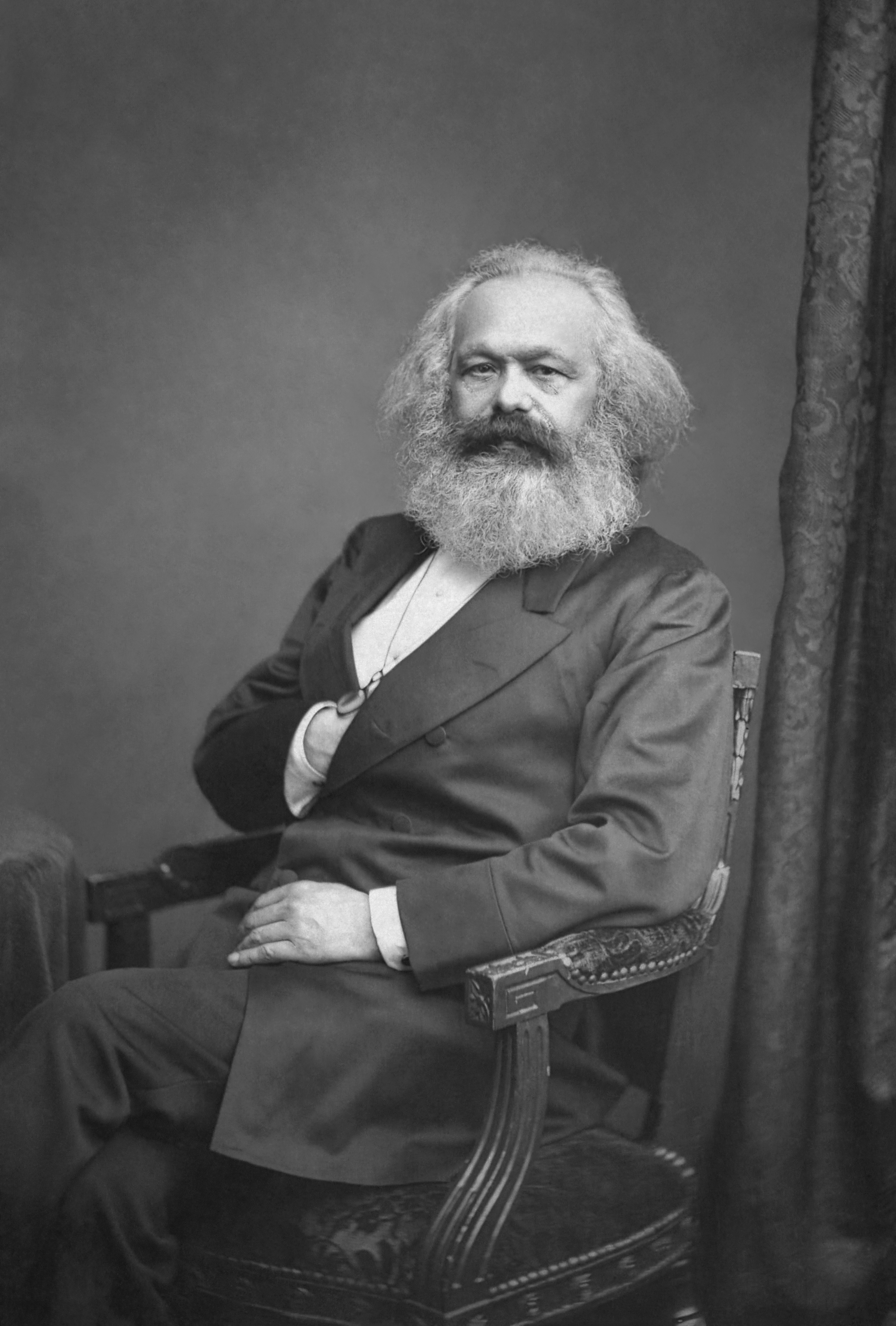
Karl Marx

Marx's most detailed treatment of subsumption appears in the "Results of the Immediate Process of Production", an unpublished chapter originally intended for Volume I of Das Kapital. In his work, subsumption describes the process by which capital establishes its command over labour, transforming both the social relations of workers and the material nature of the work itself. This process is fundamentally linked to the extraction of surplus value. Capitalist subsumption involves a "peculiar synthesis" of logical and social form-determination, where abstract economic categories come to dominate and reshape the concrete practices of social reproduction.

=== Formal subsumption ===
Formal subsumption (or formal subordination) of labour under capital is the initial stage where capital incorporates existing labour processes as it finds them, without changing their technological basis. This occurs when, for example, an independent artisan or peasant, previously owning their means of production, becomes a wage-labourer for a capitalist. The work process itself remains largely the same, but the social relation is fundamentally altered: the producer is now subordinated to the capitalist, who owns the means of production and the final product.

The defining characteristics of formal subsumption are:

- Unchanged technology: The methods of production (tools, skills, organization) are inherited from pre-capitalist modes.
- Extraction of absolute surplus-value: The primary way capitalists increase surplus value is by prolonging the working day or increasing the intensity of work. Since productivity is not revolutionized, profit depends on the absolute quantity of labour performed.
- A purely monetary relation: The previous relations of lordship or servitude are replaced by the contractual, monetary relationship between the worker (as seller of labour power) and the capitalist (as buyer). This creates an ideological veil of "freedom" and "equality" in the market, even though the relationship is based on the worker's economic compulsion to sell their labour to survive.

Marx considered this form of subsumption "formal" because capital has only formally, not yet substantively, reshaped the production process in its own image. The command over labour is direct and personal, focused on ensuring the worker labours for the required amount of time.

=== Real subsumption ===
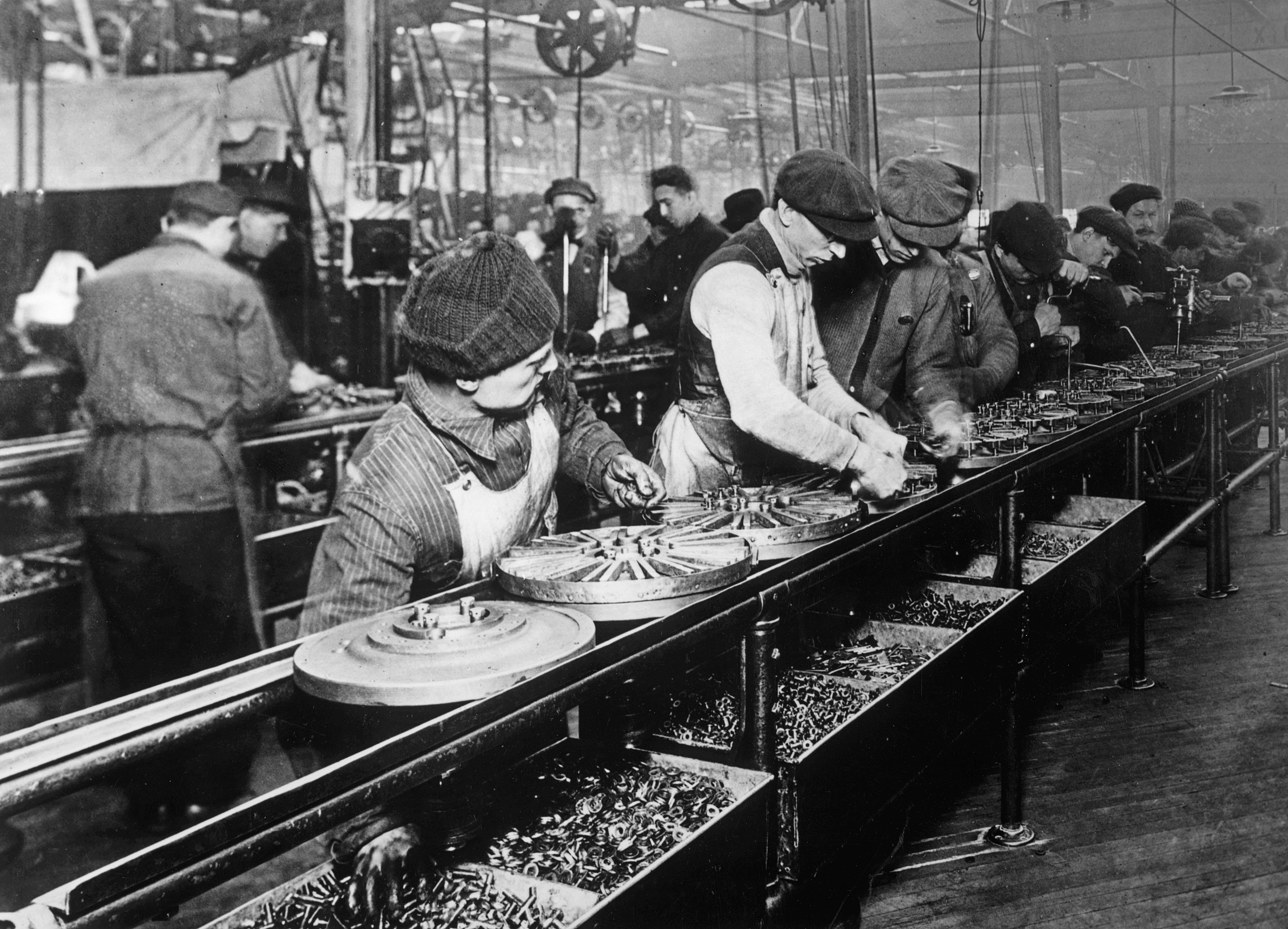
The Ford Motor Company assembly line, 1913. The mechanised factory floor is a key example of the real subsumption of labour, where the work process itself is transformed by technology to increase productivity and extract relative surplus-value.

Real subsumption (or real subordination) of labour under capital represents a more developed stage of capitalism. It occurs when the labour process is actively and continuously transformed to align with the goals of capital accumulation. This is not simply a change in social relations but a revolution in the material mode of production itself. Marx identified this transition with the rise of large-scale industry and the application of science and technology to production.

The key features of real subsumption are:

- Technological transformation: The labour process is reorganized through cooperation, the division of labour, and, most importantly, the use of machinery. Work becomes more socialized and interdependent, while the individual worker's skills are often fragmented or deskilled.
- Extraction of relative surplus-value: Surplus value is increased primarily by boosting productivity. Technology cheapens commodities, including those needed for the workers' subsistence, thereby lowering the value of labour-power and reducing the portion of the working day dedicated to "necessary labour".
- Abstract and impersonal power: The control over labour becomes less personal and more systemic, embedded in the technology and organization of the factory itself. The machine dictates the pace and rhythm of work, objectifying capital's command. This is what Marx described in the Grundrisse as the rise of fixed capital (machinery) as a dominant power over "living labour".

Under real subsumption, capital creates a mode of production "peculiar to it", leading to what Marx called a "specifically capitalist mode of production". This process has a totalizing tendency, as the logic of industrial production begins to shape social life beyond the factory walls.

== Relation to other concepts ==
=== Hegemony ===
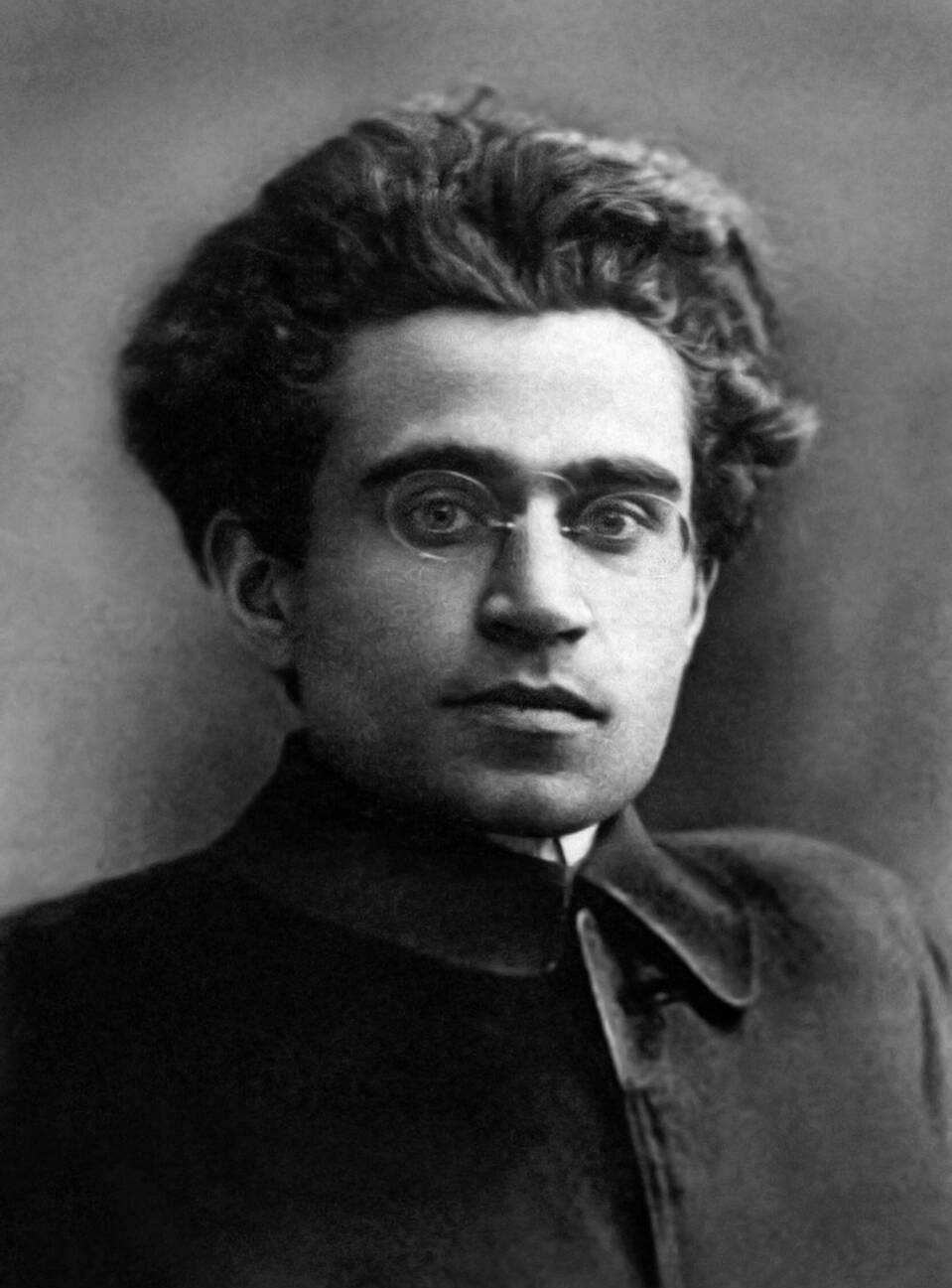
Antonio Gramsci

The concept of subsumption is closely linked to Antonio Gramsci's theory of hegemony. While Marx focused primarily on the economic and technical aspects of subordination in the workplace, Gramsci's framework helps to explain how this subordination is sustained across society through a combination of coercion and consent. Marco Briziarelli argues that subsumption is best understood not as a one-sided domination but as a set of "subsumptive relations" that function as a "hegemonic apparatus".

This perspective highlights several points:

- Subsumption is not an automatic or linear process but a site of continuous class struggle and negotiation.
- Capital must not only coerce workers but also win their consent, shaping their habits, desires, and worldviews to align with the needs of production (a process Gramsci analyzed in his essay "Americanism and Fordism").
- The state plays a crucial role as an "integral state" (combining political and civil society) in mediating these relations, for instance, through legal frameworks like labour contracts or the institutions of the welfare state.

Framing subsumption as hegemonic reveals it as a dynamic and unstable process, constantly needing to be reproduced and always facing potential resistance.

=== Fixed capital and technology ===
Real subsumption is intrinsically tied to the development of fixed capital, which Marx defined as the "organs of the human brain, created by the human hand; the power of knowledge, objectified". In large-scale industry, machinery is not just a tool but the material embodiment of capital's power and intelligence (general intellect). The machine dictates the labour process, turning the worker into a "living accessory" of a system of dead labour.

Contemporary theorists have extended this analysis to digital technologies. Communication and information technologies (ICTs) are seen as a new form of "communicative fixed capital". Digital platforms, algorithms, and data infrastructures function as modern "translation machines" that subsume communication, knowledge, and social interaction, converting them into data that can be valorized. This extends real subsumption into new domains, creating what Briziarelli calls "digital abstract space" where life and labour are increasingly mediated and controlled by computational logic.

== Later developments ==
After the republication of Marx's "lost chapter" and the Grundrisse in the mid-20th century, the concept of subsumption gained renewed interest, particularly within continental Marxism. Theorists began to extend the concept beyond the factory to describe the subsumption of society as a whole.

=== Social subsumption and the social factory ===
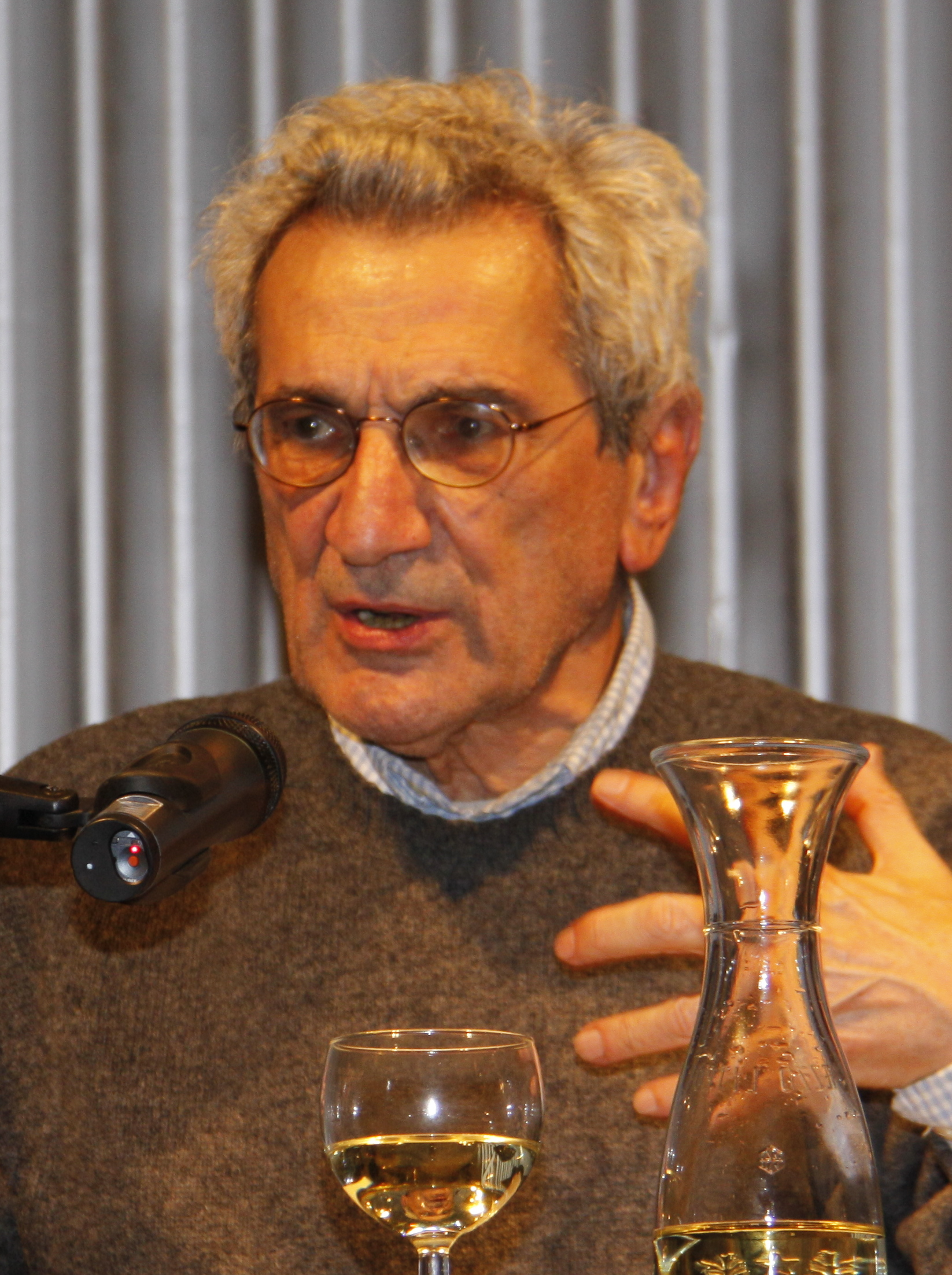
Antonio Negri

Thinkers of the Italian autonomist movement such as Mario Tronti and Antonio Negri, as well as Jacques Camatte, were pivotal in developing the idea of a transition from real to "social" or "total subsumption". They argued that in the post-Fordist era, the distinction between production and the rest of society collapses. The entire society becomes a "social factory", where value is extracted not just from waged factory labour but from all forms of life, including communication, affect, knowledge, and culture. In this view, capital "no longer has an outside"; it has subsumed the entirety of social reproduction under its logic. Negri argued that this "total subsumption" marks a new phase of capitalism where the law of value is superseded by direct political command and the exploitation of the "social worker".

=== Frankfurt School and the culture industry ===
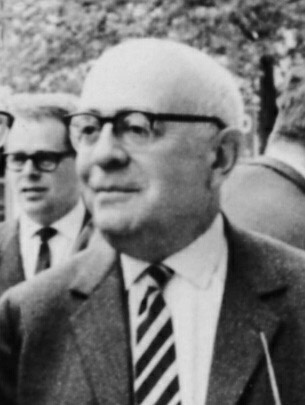
Theodor W. Adorno

Theorists of the Frankfurt School, such as Theodor W. Adorno, analyzed a similar process through the lens of "total administration" and the culture industry. For Adorno, subsumption was synonymous with the logic of identity thinking and the exchange principle, which reduces qualitative differences to quantitative equivalence. The culture industry subsumes leisure and culture under the logic of commodity production, turning art into entertainment and individuals into passive consumers. This represents a form of real subsumption that extends into the sphere of consciousness, shaping subjectivities to be compliant with the capitalist system. Adorno, influenced by Alfred Sohn-Rethel's concept of "real abstraction", saw the exchange process itself as the material basis for conceptual abstraction, which under "late capitalism" becomes a totalizing force of social integration. Guy Debord's concept of The Society of the Spectacle further developed this idea, arguing that "everything that was directly lived has receded into a representation," a total subsumption of reality by the commodity form.

=== Marxist feminism ===
Marxist feminists, such as Leopoldina Fortunati and Silvia Federici, have used the concept of subsumption to analyze unpaid domestic and reproductive labour. They argue that housework, while formally outside the sphere of wage-labour and value production, is essential for the reproduction of labour-power and is therefore informally subsumed under capital. This work, historically performed by women, constitutes a vast domain of unpaid labour upon which the entire capitalist system rests. The introduction of domestic appliances (e.g., washing machines) can be seen as a form of "real subsumption" of the household, mechanizing reproductive tasks to align them with the needs of capital.

=== Hybrid and ideal subsumption ===
In addition to the main categories of formal and real subsumption, Marxist scholar Marco Briziarelli, drawing on "symptomatic readings" of Marx and later theorists, discusses two other forms: hybrid and ideal subsumption. These describe more liminal or incomplete forms of capital's control.

Hybrid subsumption refers to situations where capital extracts surplus-value without exercising direct control over the labour process. The producer is not formally subordinated as a wage-labourer. Examples include usurers in India who advance capital for materials to producers and extract value through interest, or modern subcontracting and gig work where formally self-employed workers are dependent on capital but not directly managed.

Ideal subsumption describes an ideological or notional process where non-capitalist activities and relations are treated and understood as if they were governed by capitalist logic. It involves the hegemonic power of capitalist imagery and discourse to frame social life in its own terms. For example, under neoliberalism, individuals are encouraged to see themselves as entrepreneurs of their own lives ("human capital"), thereby internalizing capitalist norms of competition and efficiency even in non-work contexts. Briziarelli notes that this form is fundamental to the construction of subjectivities that are "adequate to capital".

== Critique of periodisation and total subsumption ==
Theories of "total" or "social" subsumption, particularly those of Negri and Adorno, have been criticized for presenting a deterministic and overly schematic view of capitalist development. These critiques argue against a linear periodisation that sees capitalism as progressing neatly from a formal to a real, and finally to a total, phase of subsumption. Critics contend that such models overstate the homogenizing power of capital and neglect the ongoing complexities and contradictions of its development.

Arguments against total subsumption include:

- Non-linearity: Different forms of subsumption (formal, real, and hybrid) coexist and interact in complex ways across the global economy. Capital may "revert" to formal or hybrid methods where they are more profitable (e.g., in regions with low wages or weak labour regulations), meaning there is no necessary teleological drive toward real subsumption everywhere.
- The persistence of mediation: Theories of total subsumption often claim that core mediating structures of capitalism, such as the law of value or the distinction between production and reproduction, have been overcome. Critics argue that these structures, while transformed, remain central to capitalist exploitation. Negri's assertion that value has been replaced by direct command is seen as a "productivist ontology" that overlooks the crucial role of exchange and circulation in realizing value. Similarly, Adorno's focus on the exchange principle is criticized for reducing all social domination to the logic of the commodity-form, thereby neglecting the specific dynamics of exploitation in the production process.
- The problem of closure: By positing a "completed" or "total" subsumption, these theories risk presenting capitalism as a closed, monolithic system without any genuine exteriority or potential for rupture. This can lead to a "Manichean" opposition between an all-powerful capital and an equally abstract force of resistance (e.g., Negri's "multitude"), obscuring the concrete and varied sites of struggle within the system.

Instead of a totalizing historical schema, critics propose a more dynamic and open conception of subsumption as a generative and contested process. This approach emphasizes the ongoing articulation between the "inner logic" of capital accumulation and the historical and geographical specificities of social reproduction, recognizing that subsumption is an unending and contradictory process rather than a completed state.

=== Determinate supersumption ===
In his 2024 book Supersuming Subsumption, Marco Briziarelli argues that subsumption is not a guaranteed, linear process but a fluid, open, and contradictory set of "subsumptive relations" that are always incomplete and contested. To capture the inherent instability and potential for resistance within this process, Briziarelli introduces the concept of "determinate supersumption". It is the dialectical "other" of subsumption, representing the forces that negate, interrupt, or reverse the subsuming process. This can manifest in two main ways:

- Objective supersumption: Systemic contradictions and crises inherent to capitalism, such as the tendency of the rate of profit to fall or the creation of "fixes" that only defer crises.
- Subjective supersumption: The active resistance and creative practices of "living labour". This includes both organized class struggle (molar level) and everyday, molecular forms of resistance like la perruque (using work time and tools for personal projects), sabotage, or re-appropriating digital platforms for political organizing.

For Briziarelli, "living labour" (the embodied, creative capacity of workers) is an "exteriority" that capital can never fully internalize or control, making it a permanent source of instability and the ultimate limit to subsumption. Therefore, subsumption and supersumption exist in a constant dialectical tension, representing capitalism's struggle for control and the ever-present possibility of its undoing.

== See also ==
- Abstract and concrete labour
- Commodification
- Primitive accumulation
