= List of communist ideologies =

Schools of thought on classless society

Since the time of Karl Marx and Friedrich Engels, a variety of developments have been made in communist theory and attempts to build a communist society, leading to a variety of different communist ideologies. These span philosophical, social, political and economic ideologies and movements, and can be split into three broad categories: Marxist-based ideologies, Leninist-based ideologies, and Non-Marxist ideologies, though influence between the different ideologies is found throughout and key theorists may be described as belonging to one or important to multiple ideologies.

== Background ==
Communist ideologies notable enough in the history of communism include philosophical, social, political and economic ideologies and movements whose ultimate goal is the establishment of a communist society, a socioeconomic order structured upon the ideas of common ownership of the means of production and the absence of social classes, money and the state.

Self-identified communists hold a variety of views, including libertarian communism (anarcho-communism and council communism), Marxist communism (left communism, libertarian Marxism, Maoism, Leninism, Marxism–Leninism, and Trotskyism), non-Marxist communism, and religious communism (Christian communism, Islamic communism and Jewish communism). While it originates from the works of 19th century German philosophers Karl Marx and Friedrich Engels, Marxist communism has developed into many different branches and schools of thought, with the result that there is now no single definitive Marxist theory.

Different communist schools of thought place a greater emphasis on certain aspects of classical Marxism while rejecting or modifying other aspects. Many communist schools of thought have sought to combine Marxian concepts and non-Marxian concepts which has then led to contradictory conclusions. However, there is a movement toward the recognition that historical materialism and dialectical materialism remains the fundamental aspect of all Marxist communist schools of thought. The offshoots of Marxism–Leninism are the most well-known of these and have been a driving force in international relations during most of the 20th century.

== Marxist communism ==
=== Marxism ===
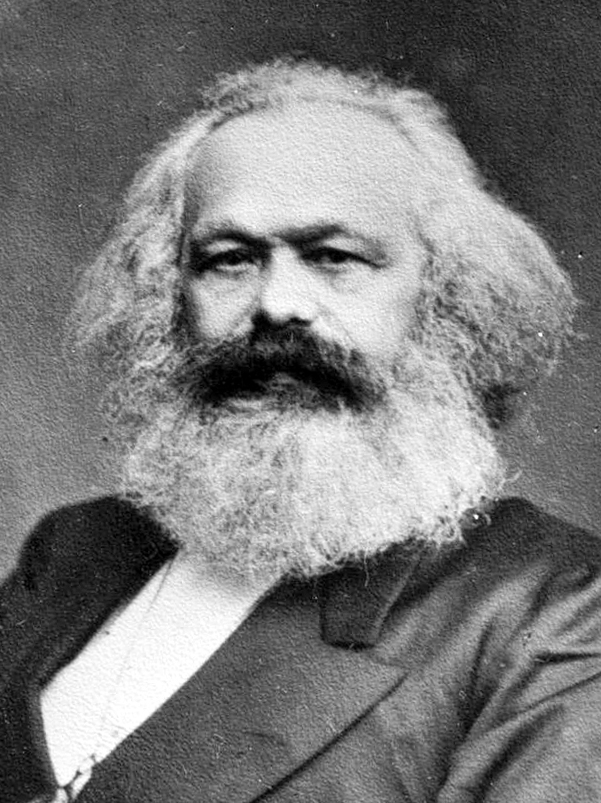
Karl Marx

Marxism is a method of socioeconomic analysis that views class relations and social conflict using a materialist interpretation of historical development and takes a dialectical view of social transformation. It originates from the works of 19th century German philosophers Karl Marx and Friedrich Engels. Classical Marxism is the economic, philosophical and sociological theories expounded by Marx and Engels as contrasted with later developments in Marxism, especially Leninism and Marxism–Leninism.

Under the capitalist mode of production, this struggle materializes between the minority (the bourgeoisie), who own the means of production, and the vast majority of the population (the proletariat), who produce goods and services. Starting with the concept that social change occurs because of the struggle between different classes within society who are under contradiction against each other, a Marxist would conclude that capitalism exploits and oppresses the proletariat, therefore capitalism will inevitably lead to a proletarian revolution. In a socialist society, private property—in the form of the means of production—would be replaced by co-operative ownership. A socialist economy would not base production on the creation of private profits, but on the criteria of satisfying human needs—that is, production would be carried out directly for use. As Friedrich Engels said: "Then the capitalist mode of appropriation, in which the product enslaves first the producer, and then the appropriator, is replaced by the mode of appropriation of the product that is based upon the nature of the modern means of production; upon the one hand, direct social appropriation, as means to the maintenance and extension of production - on the other, direct individual appropriation, as means of subsistence and of enjoyment".

Marxian economics and its proponents view capitalism as economically unsustainable and incapable of improving the living standards of the population due to its need to compensate for falling rates of profit by cutting employee's wages, social benefits and pursuing military aggression. The socialist system would succeed capitalism as humanity's mode of production through workers' revolution. According to Marxian crisis theory, socialism is not an inevitability, but an economic necessity.

=== Orthodox Marxism ===
Orthodox Marxism is the body of Marxist thought that emerged after the death of Marx and which became the official philosophy of the socialist movement as represented in the Second International until World War I in 1914. Orthodox Marxism aims to simplify, codify and systematize Marxist method and theory by clarifying the perceived ambiguities and contradictions of classical Marxism. The philosophy of orthodox Marxism includes the understanding that material development (advances in technology in the productive forces) is the primary agent of change in the structure of society and of human social relations, and that social systems and their relations (e.g. feudalism, capitalism and so on) become contradictory and inefficient as the productive forces develop, which results in some form of social revolution arising in response to the mounting contradictions. This revolutionary change is the vehicle for fundamental society-wide changes and ultimately leads to the emergence of new economic systems.

As a term, orthodox Marxism refers to the methods of historical materialism and of dialectical materialism and not the normative aspects inherent to classical Marxism, without implying dogmatic adherence to the results of Marx's investigations. One of the most important historical proponents of Orthodox Marxism was the Czech-Austrian theorist Karl Kautsky.

=== Neo-Marxism ===
Neo-Marxism is a Marxist school of thought originating from 20th-century approaches to amend or extend Marxism and Marxist theory, typically by incorporating elements from other intellectual traditions such as critical theory, psychoanalysis, or existentialism. The Frankfurt School is often described as neo-Marxist.

== Leninist-based ideologies ==
=== Leninism ===
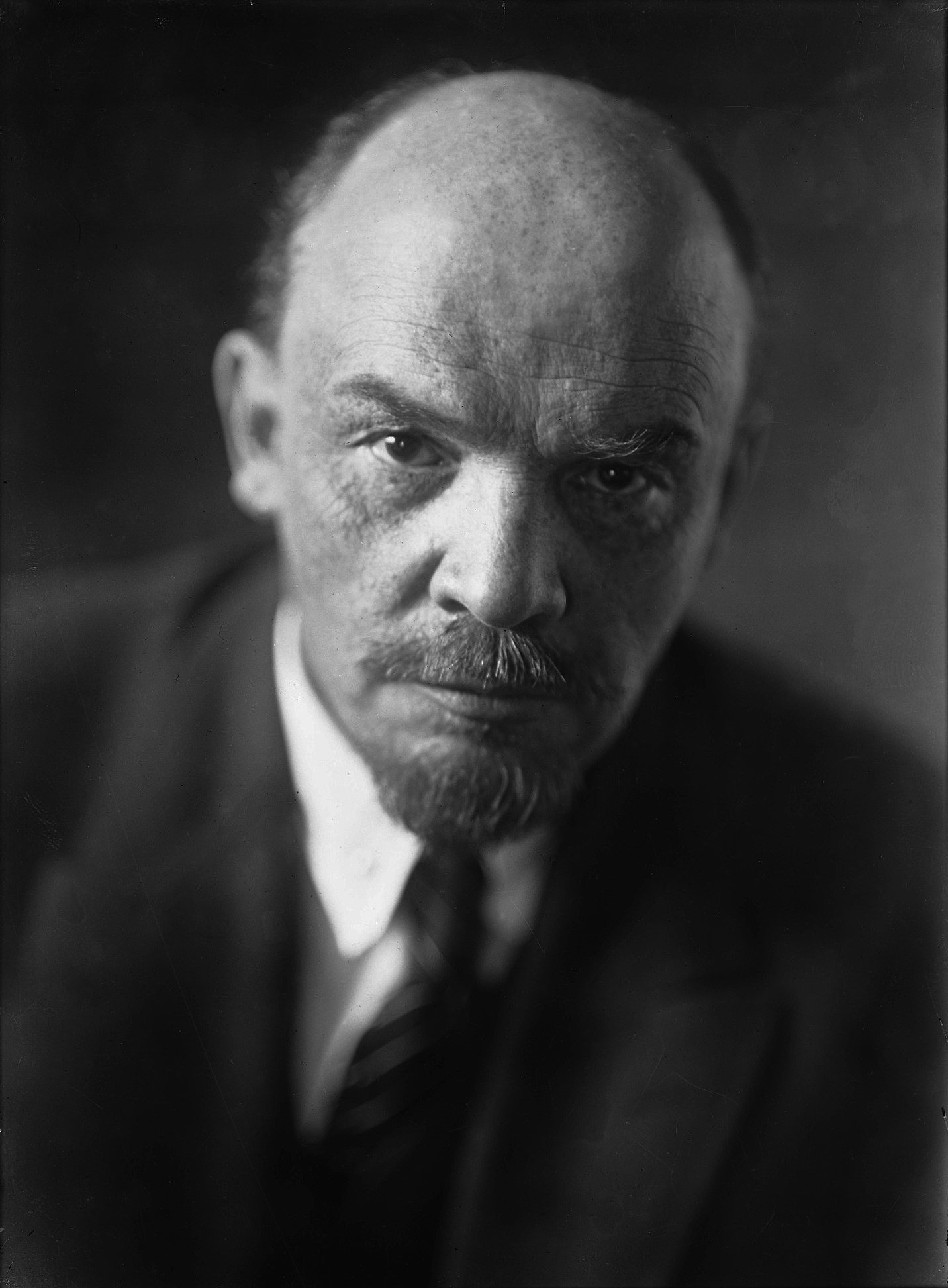
Vladimir Lenin

Leninism is a political theory for the organisation of a revolutionary vanguard party and the achievement of a dictatorship of the proletariat as political prelude to the establishment of socialism. Developed by and named for the Russian revolutionary Vladimir Lenin, from the Bolshevik faction of the Bolshevik-Menshevik split in the Russian Social Democratic Labour Party, Leninism comprises political and economic theories developed from orthodox Marxism and Lenin's interpretations of Marxist theories, including his original theoretical contributions such as his analysis of imperialism, principles of party organization and the implementation of socialism through revolution and New Economic Policy reform thereafter, for practical application to the socio-political conditions of the Russian Empire of the early 20th century.

=== Marxism–Leninism ===
Marxism–Leninism is a political ideology developed by Joseph Stalin in the late 1920s. Based on Stalin's understanding and synthesis of both Marxism and Leninism, it was the official state ideology of the Soviet Union and the parties of the Communist International after Bolshevisation. After the death of Lenin in 1924, Stalin established universal ideological orthodoxy among the Russian Communist Party (Bolsheviks), the Soviet Union and the Communist International to establish universal Marxist–Leninist praxis. In the late 1930s, Stalin's official textbook The History of the Communist Party of the Soviet Union (Bolsheviks) (1938), made the term Marxism–Leninism common political-science usage among communists and non-communists.

The purpose of Marxism–Leninism is the revolutionary transformation of a capitalist state into a socialist state by way of two-stage revolution led by a vanguard party of professional revolutionaries, drawn from the proletariat. To realise the two-stage transformation of the state, the vanguard party establishes the dictatorship of the proletariat and determines policy through democratic centralism. The Marxist–Leninist communist party is the vanguard for the political, economic and social transformation of a capitalist society into a socialist society which is the lower stage of socio-economic development and progress towards the upper-stage communist society which is stateless and classless, yet it features public ownership of the means of production, accelerated industrialisation, pro-active development of society's productive forces (research and development) and nationalised natural resources.

As the official ideology of the Soviet Union, Marxism–Leninism was adopted by communist parties worldwide with variation in local application. Parties with a Marxist–Leninist understanding of the historical development of socialism advocate for the nationalisation of natural resources and monopolist industries of capitalism and for their internal democratization as part of the transition to workers' control. The economy under such a government is primarily coordinated through a universal economic plan with varying degrees of market distribution. Since the fall of the Soviet Union and Eastern Bloc countries, many communist parties of the world today continue to use Marxism–Leninism as their method of understanding the conditions of their respective countries. A variety of currents developed from Marxism-Leninism have gained prominence in various countries, including Bolshevism and Mariáteguism.

=== Stalinism ===
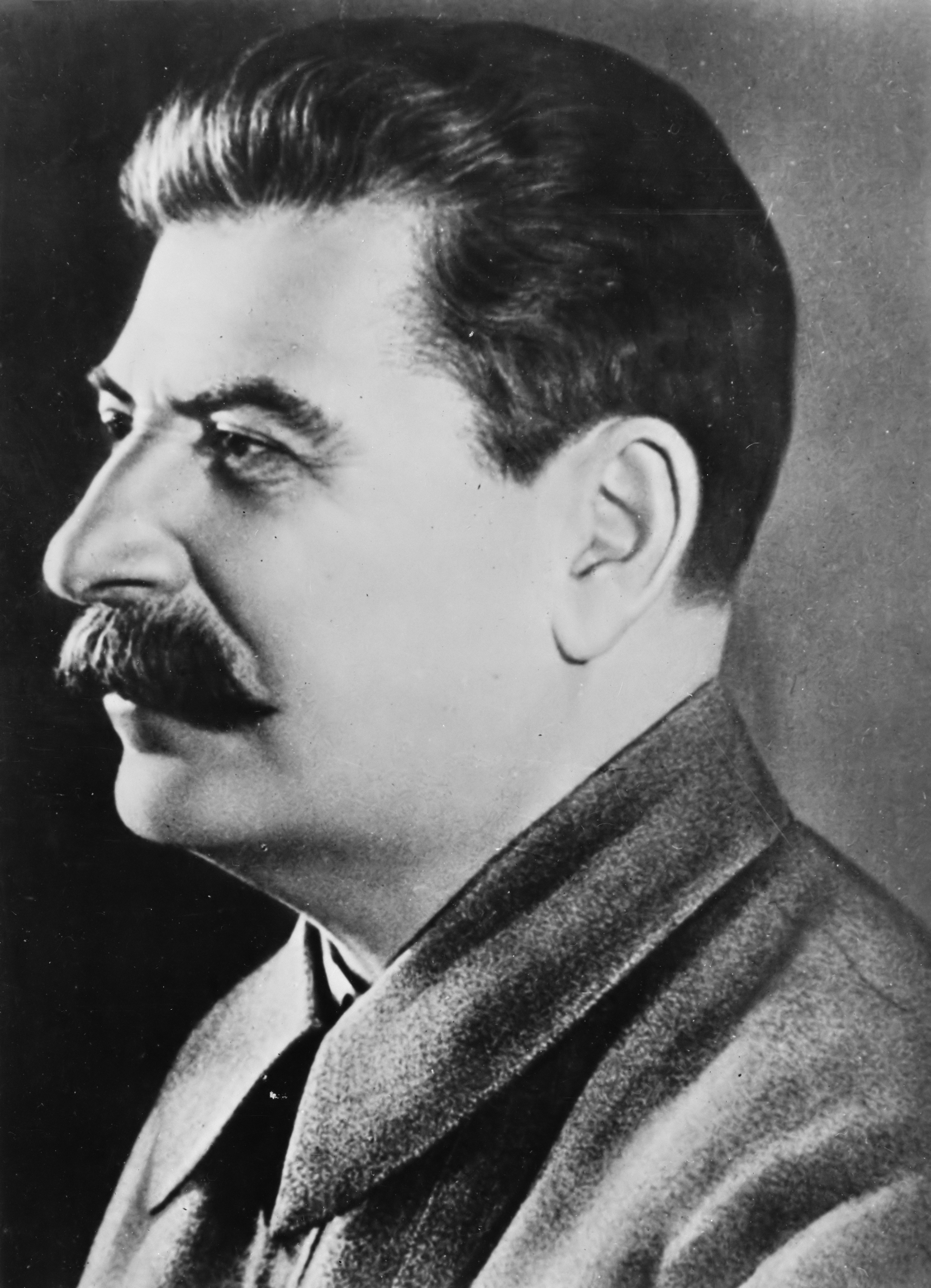
Joseph Stalin

Stalinism is the means of governing and related policies implemented from 1927 to 1953 by Stalin. Stalinist policies and ideas that were developed in the Soviet Union included rapid industrialisation, the theory of socialism in one country, collectivisation of agriculture, intensification of the class struggle under socialism, a cult of personality, and subordination of the interests of foreign communist parties to those of the Communist Party of the Soviet Union (Bolsheviks), deemed by Stalinism to be the leading vanguard party of communist revolution at the time.

As a political term, it has a variety of uses, but most commonly it is used as a pejorative shorthand for Marxism–Leninism by a variety of competing political tendencies such as capitalism and Trotskyism. Although Stalin himself repudiated any qualitatively original contribution to Marxism, the communist movement usually credits him with systematizing and expanding the ideas of Lenin into the ideology of Marxism–Leninism as a distinct body of work. In this sense, Stalinism can be thought of as being roughly equivalent to Marxism–Leninism, although this is not universally agreed upon. At other times, the term is used as a general umbrella term—again pejoratively—to describe a wide variety of political systems and governments. In this sense, it can be seen as being roughly equivalent to actually existing socialism, although sometimes it is used to describe totalitarian governments that are not socialist.

Some of the contributions to communist theory that Stalin is particularly known for are the following:

- The theoretical work concerning nationalities as seen in Marxism and the National Question.
- The notion of socialism in one country.
- Marxism and Problems of Linguistics.
- The theory of aggravation of class struggle under socialism, a theoretical base supporting the repression of political opponents as necessary.

=== Trotskyism ===
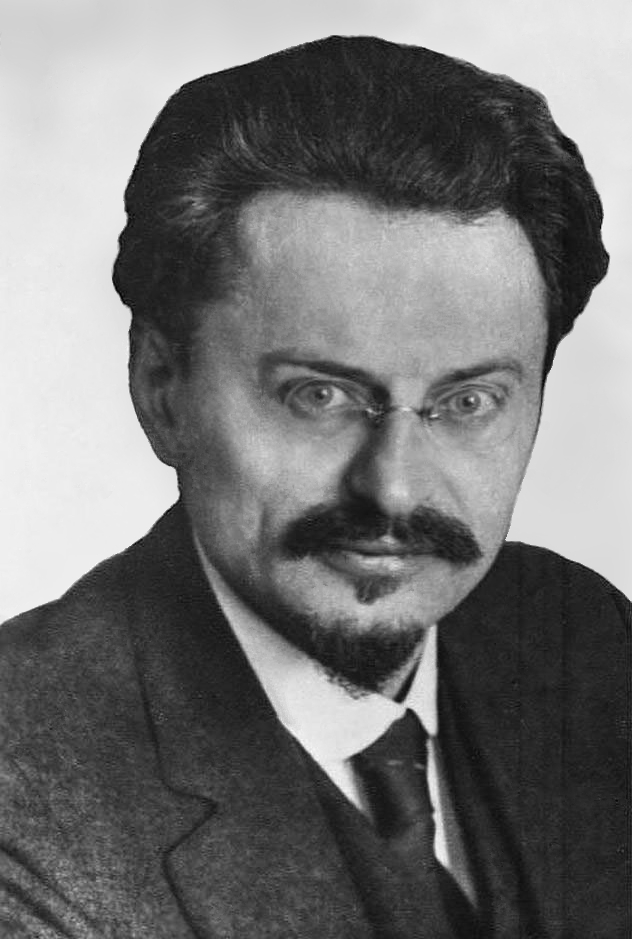
Leon Trotsky

Leon Trotsky and his supporters organized into the Left Opposition and their platform became known as Trotskyism. Stalin eventually succeeded in gaining control of the Soviet regime and Trotskyist attempts to remove Stalin from power resulted in Trotsky's exile from the Soviet Union in 1929. During Trotsky's exile, mainstream communism fractured into two distinct branches, i.e. Trotskyism and Stalinism. Trotskyism supports the theory of permanent revolution and world revolution instead of the two-stage theory and socialism in one country. It supported proletarian internationalism and another communist revolution in the Soviet Union which Trotsky claimed had become a degenerated worker's state under the leadership of Stalin in which class relations had re-emerged in a new form, rather than the dictatorship of the proletariat. In 1938, Trotsky founded the Fourth International, a Trotskyist rival to the Stalinist Communist International.

Trotskyist ideas became more prominent through the 1960s, having found echo among political movements in some countries in Asia and Latin America, especially in Argentina, Brazil, Bolivia, and Sri Lanka. Many Trotskyist organizations are also active in more stable, developed countries in North America and Western Europe. Trotsky's politics differed sharply from those of Stalin and Mao, most importantly in declaring the need for an international proletarian revolution (rather than socialism in one country) and unwavering support for a true dictatorship of the proletariat-based on democratic principles. As a whole, Trotsky's theories and attitudes were never accepted in Marxist–Leninist circles after Trotsky's expulsion, either within or outside of the Soviet Bloc. This remained the case even after the "Secret Speech" and subsequent events critics claim exposed the fallibility of Stalin.

Trotsky's followers claim to be the heirs of Lenin in the same way that mainstream Marxist–Leninists do. There are several distinguishing characteristics of this school of thought—foremost is the theory of permanent revolution, contrasted to the theory of socialism in one country. This stated that in less-developed countries the bourgeoisie were too weak to lead their own bourgeois-democratic revolutions. Due to this weakness, it fell to the proletariat to carry out the bourgeois revolution. With power in its hands, the proletariat would then continue this revolution permanently, transforming it from a national bourgeois revolution to a socialist international revolution. Another shared characteristic between Trotskyists is a variety of theoretical justifications for their negative appraisal of the post-Lenin Soviet Union after Trotsky was expelled by a majority vote from the All-Union Communist Party (Bolsheviks) and subsequently from the Soviet Union. As a consequence, Trotsky defined the Soviet Union under Stalin as a planned economy ruled over by a bureaucratic caste. Trotsky advocated overthrowing the government of the Soviet Union after he was expelled from it. Trotskyist currents include orthodox Trotskyism, third camp, Posadism, Pabloism, and Morenism.

=== Maoism ===
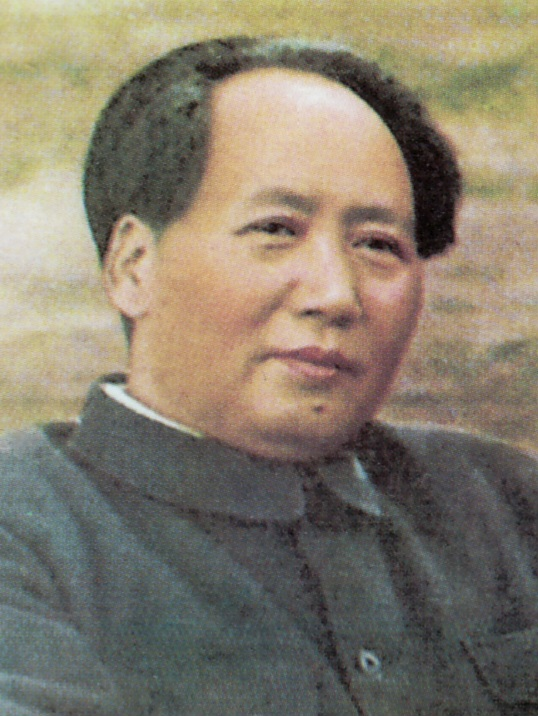
Mao Zedong

Maoism is the Marxist–Leninist trend of communism associated with Mao Zedong and was mostly practised within the People's Republic of China. Khrushchev's reforms heightened ideological differences between China and the Soviet Union, which became increasingly apparent in the 1960s. As the Sino-Soviet split in the international communist movement turned toward open hostility, China portrayed itself as a leader of the underdeveloped world against the two superpowers, the United States and the Soviet Union.

Parties and groups that supported the Chinese Communist Party (CCP) in their criticism against the new Soviet leadership proclaimed themselves as anti-revisionist and denounced the Communist Party of the Soviet Union and the parties aligned with it as revisionist "capitalist roaders". The Sino-Soviet split resulted in divisions amongst communist parties around the world. Notably, the Party of Labour of Albania sided with the People's Republic of China. Effectively, the CCP under Mao Zedong became the rallying forces of a parallel international communist tendency. The ideology of the Chinese communist party, Marxism–Leninism–Mao Zedong Thought, was adopted by many of these groups.

After Mao's death and his replacement by Deng Xiaoping, the international Maoist movement diverged. One sector accepted the new leadership in China whereas a second renounced the new leadership and reaffirmed their commitment to Mao's legacy and a third renounced Maoism altogether and aligned with Albania.

=== Deng Xiaoping Theory ===
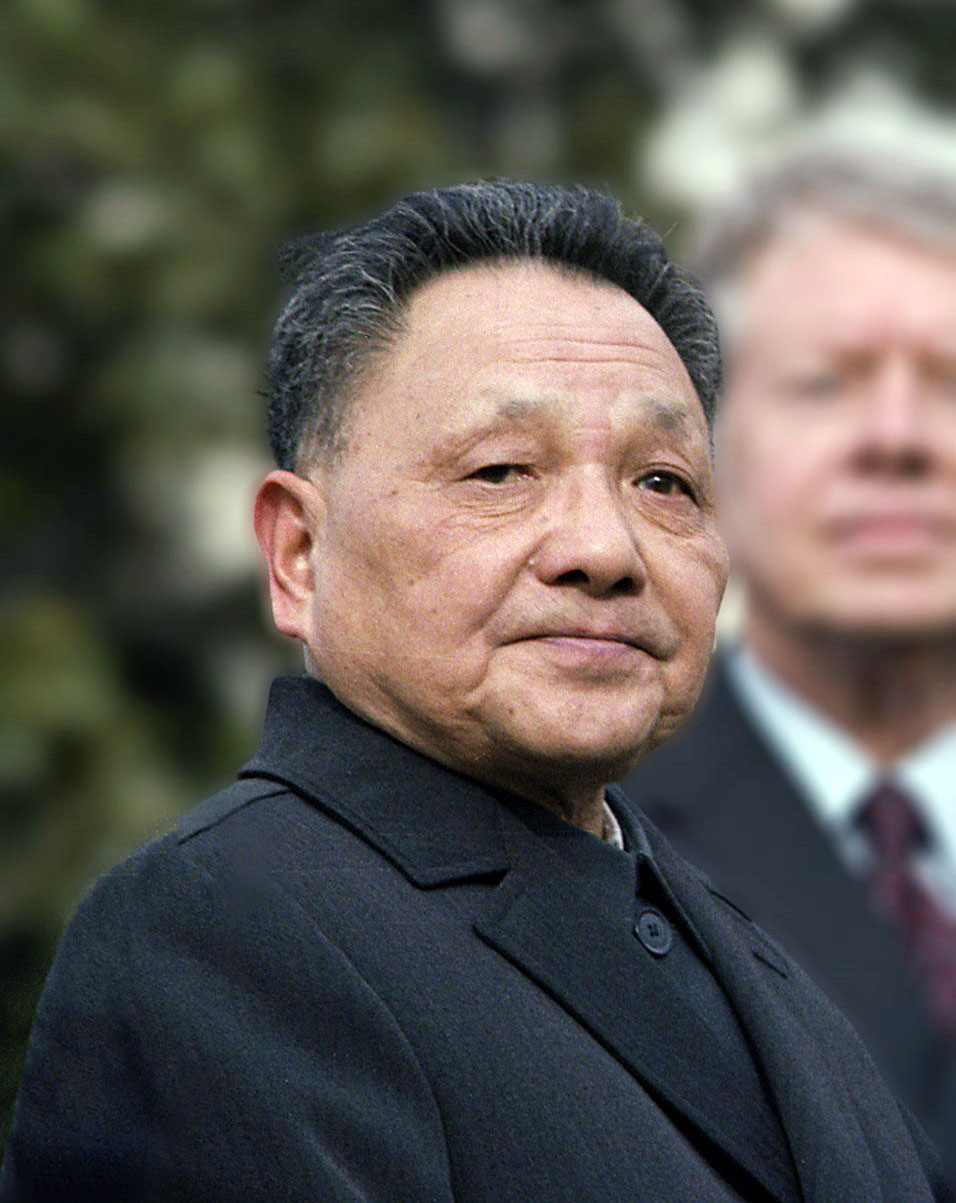
Deng Xiaoping visiting the US in 1979.

Drawing inspiration from Lenin's New Economic Policy, Deng Xiaoping Theory is a political and economic ideology first developed by Chinese leader Deng Xiaoping. The theory does not claim to reject Marxism–Leninism or Mao Zedong Thought, but instead it seeks to adapt them to the existing socio-economic conditions of China. Deng also stressed opening China to the outside world, the implementation of one country, two systems and through the phrase "seek truth from facts" an advocate of political and economic pragmatism.

As reformist communism and a branch of Maoism, Dengism is often criticized by traditional Maoists. Dengists believe that isolated in our current international order and with an extremely underdeveloped economy it is first and foremost necessary to bridge the gap between China and Western capitalism as quickly as possible in order for socialism to be successful (see the theory of primary stage of socialism). In order to encourage and promote the advancement of productivity by creating competition and innovation, Dengist thought promotes the idea that the PRC needs to introduce certain market elements in a socialist country. Dengists still believe that China needs public ownership of land, banks, raw materials and strategic central industries so a democratically elected government can make decisions on how to use them for the benefit of the country as a whole instead of the land owners, but at the same time private ownership is allowed and encouraged in industries of finished goods and services. According to Deng Xiaoping Theory, private owners in those industries are not a bourgeoisie. Because in accordance with Marxist theory, bourgeois owns land and raw materials. Private company owners are called civil run enterprises.

The People's Republic of China was the first country that adopted this belief. It boosted its economy and achieved the Chinese economic miracle. It has increased the Chinese GDP growth rate to over 8% per year for thirty years and China now has the second highest GDP in the world. Due to the influence of Dengism, Vietnam and Laos have also adopted similar beliefs and policies, allowing Laos to increase its real GDP growth rate to 8.3%. Cuba is also starting to embrace such ideas. Dengists take a very strong position against any form of personality cults which appeared in the Soviet Union during Stalin's rule and the current North Korea.

=== Marxism–Leninism–Maoism ===
Marxism–Leninism–Maoism is a political philosophy that builds upon Marxism–Leninism and Mao Zedong Thought. It was first formalised by the Peruvian communist party Shining Path in 1988.

The synthesis of Marxism–Leninism–Maoism did not occur during the life of Mao. From the 1960s, groups that called themselves Maoist, or which upheld Marxism–Leninism–Mao Zedong Thought, were not unified around a common understanding of Maoism and had instead their own particular interpretations of the political, philosophical, economical and military works of Mao. Maoism as a unified, coherent stage of Marxism was not synthesized until the late 1980s through the experience of the people's war waged by the Shining Path. This led the Shining Path to posit Maoism as the newest development of Marxism in 1988.

Since then, it has grown and developed significantly and has served as an animating force of revolutionary movements in countries such as Brazil, Colombia, Ecuador, India, Nepal and the Philippines and has also led to efforts being undertaken towards the constitution or reconstitution of communist parties in countries such as Austria, France, Germany, Sweden and the United States.

=== Prachanda Path ===
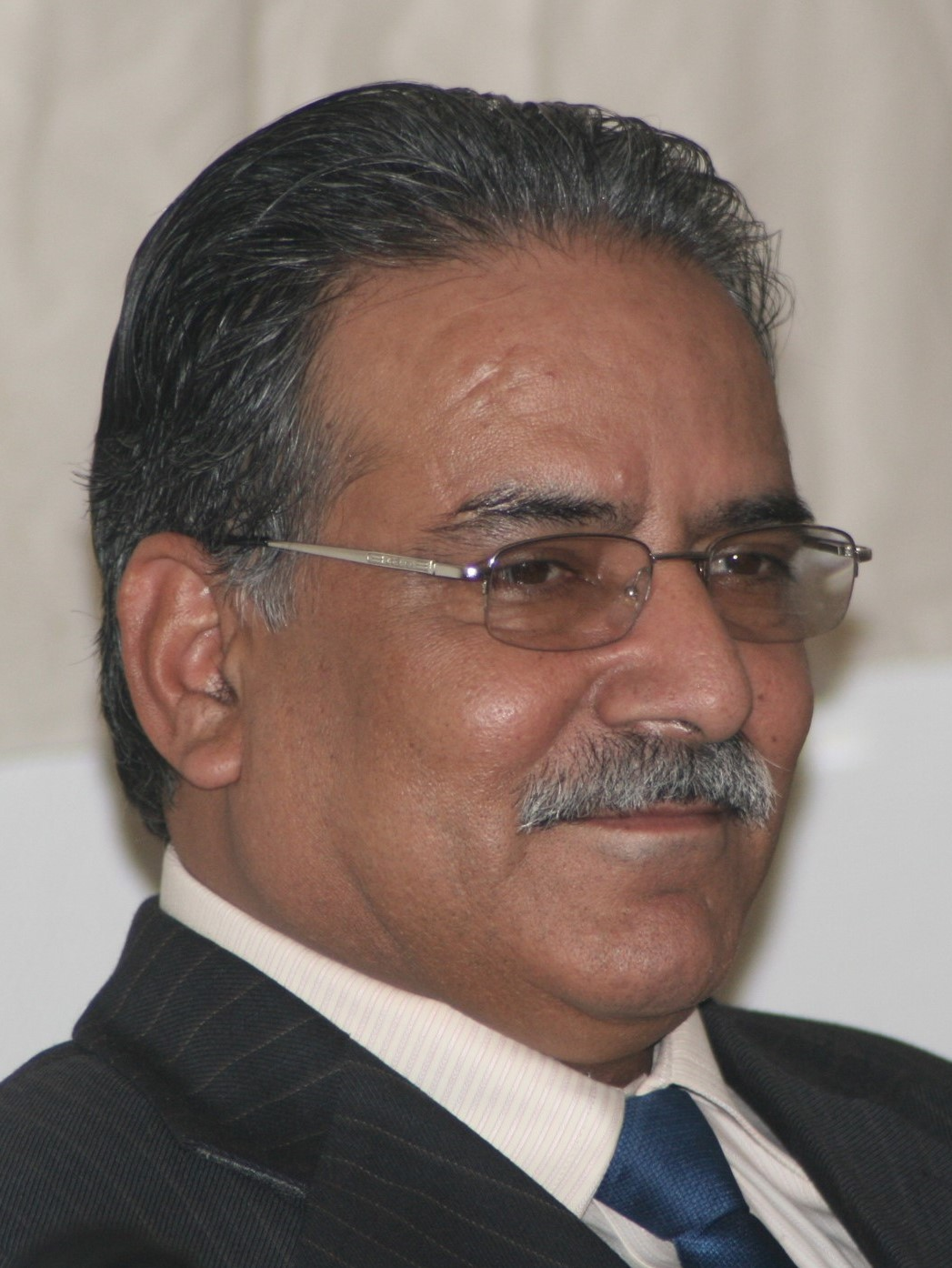
Prachanda

Marxism–Leninism–Maoism–Prachanda Path is the ideological line of the Communist Party of Nepal (Maoist Centre). It is considered to be a further development of Marxism–Leninism and Maoism. It is named after the leader of the CPN(M), Pushpa Kamal Dahal, commonly known as Prachanda. Prachanda Path was proclaimed in 2001 and its formulation was partially inspired by the Shining Path which refers to its ideological line as Marxism–Leninism–Maoism–Gonzalo Thought. Prachanda Path does not make an ideological break with Marxism–Leninism or Maoism, but rather it is an extension of these ideologies based on the political situation of Nepal. The doctrine came into existence after it was realized that the ideology of Marxism–Leninism and Maoism could not be practiced as done in the past, therefore Prachanda Path based on the circumstances of Nepalese politics was adopted by the party. Prachanda's positions are seen by some Marxist–Leninist–Maoists around the world as "revisionist".

=== Other Maoist tendencies ===
Other Maoist-based tendencies include Maoism–Third Worldism, National Democracy in the Philippines, and Naxalism, an ongoing Maoist-based insurgency in India.

=== People's Multiparty Democracy (Madanism) ===
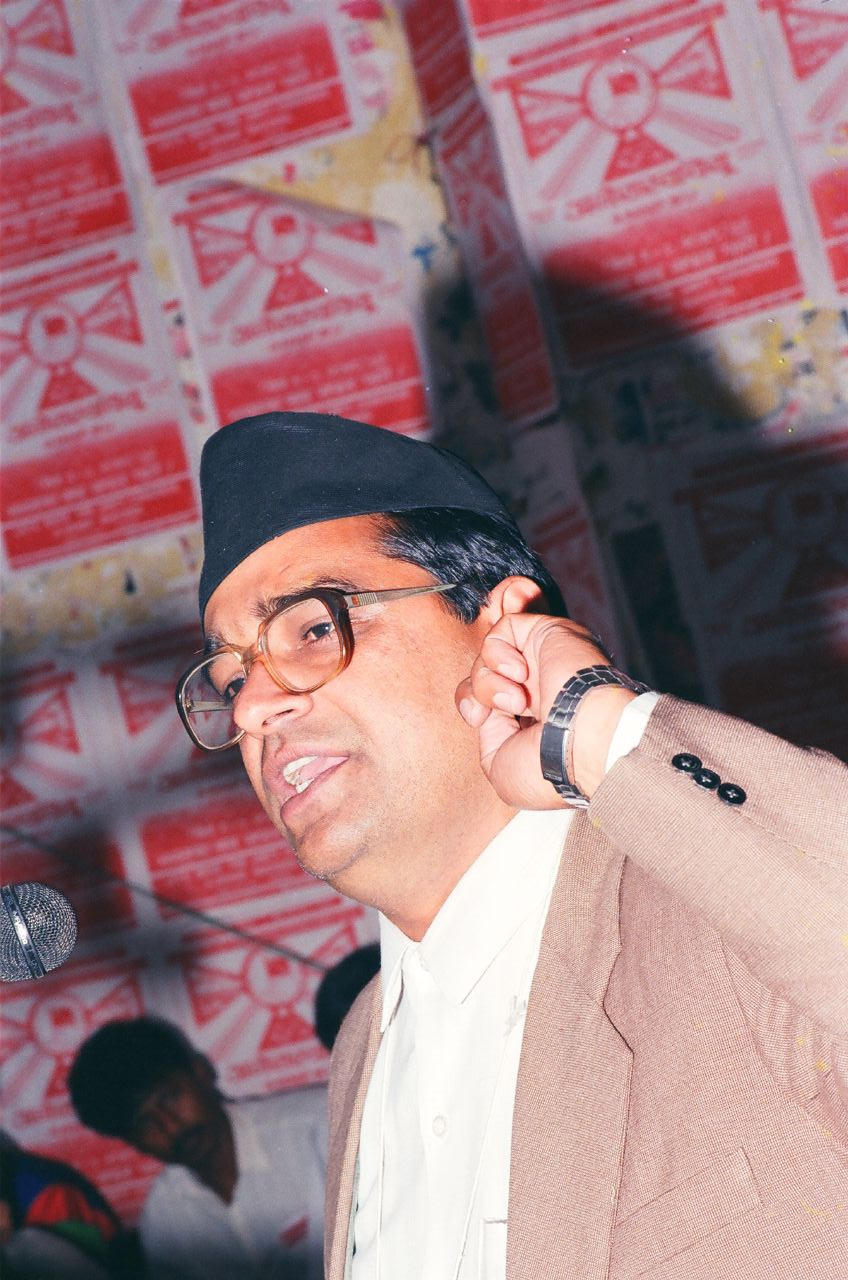
Madan Bhandari delivering a speech.

People's Multiparty Democracy (Nepali: जनताको बहुदलिय जनबाद, abbreviated जबज, also called Marxism-Leninism-Madanism (मार्क्सवाद–लेनिनवाद–मदानवाद)) refers to the ideological line of the Communist Party of Nepal (Unified Marxist–Leninist) and Nepal Communist Party. This thought abandons the traditional Leninist idea of a revolutionary communist vanguard party in favor of a democratic multi-party system. It is considered an extension of Marxism–Leninism by Madan Bhandari, the CPN-UML leader who developed it, and is based on the local politics of Nepal.

=== Xi Jinping Thought ===
Xi Jinping Thought is an ideological doctrine based on the writings, speeches and policies of Chinese Communist Party general secretary Xi Jinping. According to the CCP, Xi Jinping Thought "builds on and further enriches" previous party ideologies and has also been called as the "Marxism of contemporary China and of the 21st century". It consists of 14-point fundamental principles, which were announced together with Xi Jinping Thought.

=== Hoxhaism ===
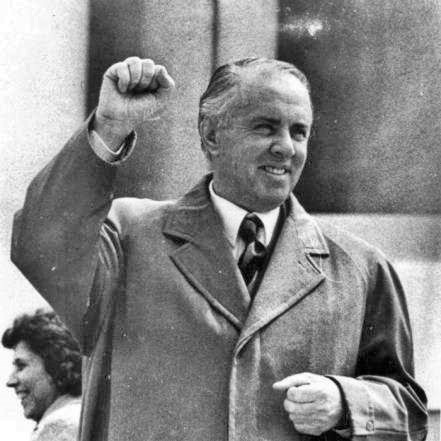
Enver Hoxha

Hoxhaism is an anti-revisionist Marxist-Leninist variant that appeared after the ideological row between the CCP and the Party of Labour of Albania in 1978. The Albanians rallied a new separate international tendency. This tendency would demarcate itself by a strict defense of the legacy of Stalin and fierce criticism of virtually all other communist groupings as revisionist.

Critical of the United States, Soviet Union and China, Enver Hoxha declared the latter two to be social-imperialist and condemned the Soviet invasion of Czechoslovakia by withdrawing from the Warsaw Pact in response. Hoxhaism asserts the right of nations to pursue socialism by different paths, dictated by the conditions in those countries. Hoxha declared Albania to be the world's only state legitimately adhering to Marxism–Leninism after 1978. The Albanians were able to win over a large share of the Maoists, mainly in Latin America such as the Popular Liberation Army and the Marxist–Leninist Communist Party of Ecuador, but it also had a significant international following in general.

After the fall of the communist government in Albania, the pro-Albanian parties are grouped around an international conference and the publication Unity and Struggle.

=== Titoism ===
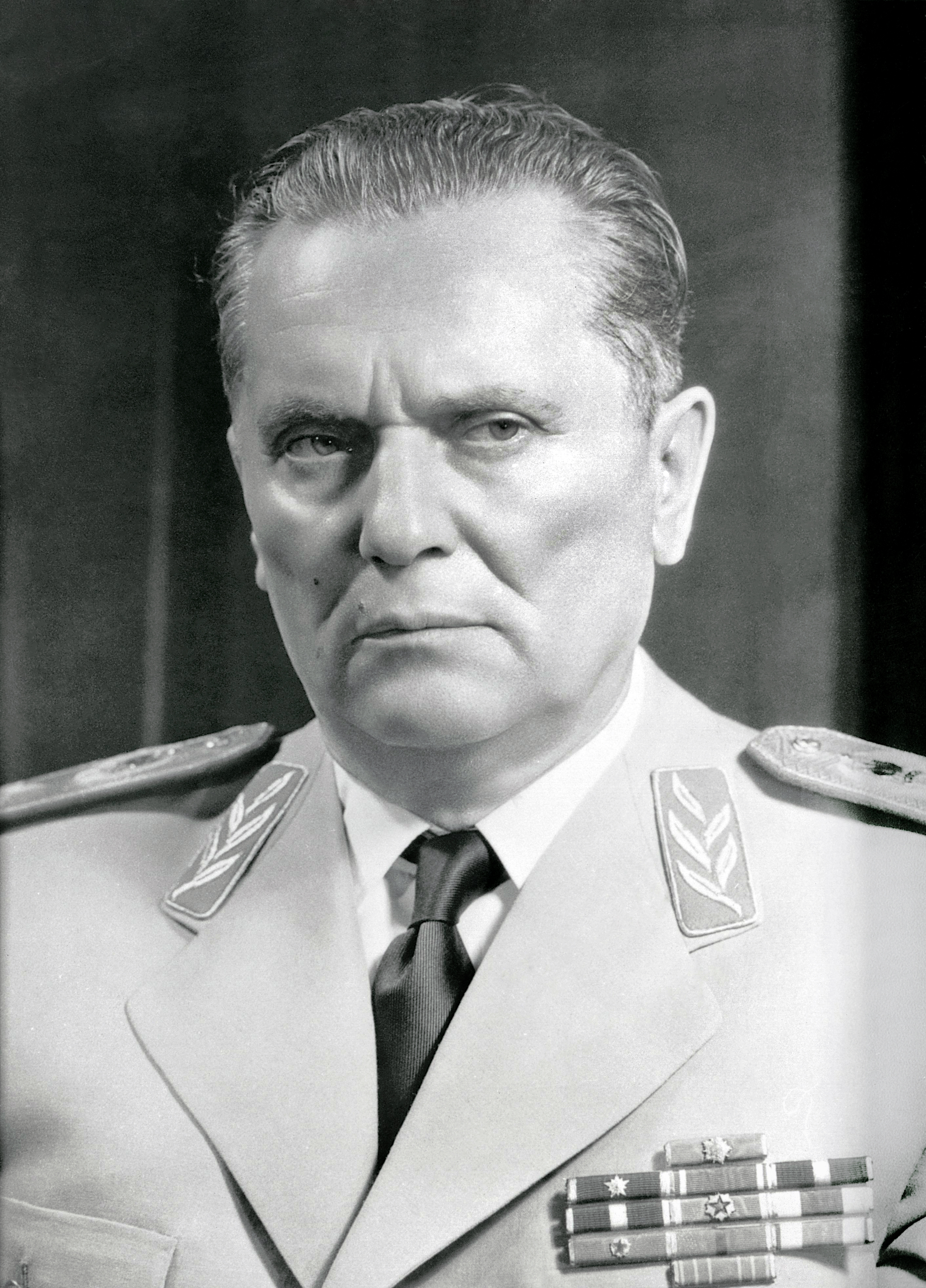
Josip Broz Tito

Titoism is described as the post-World War II policies and practices associated with Josip Broz Tito during the Cold War, characterized by an opposition to the Soviet Union.

Elements of Titoism are characterized by policies and practices based on the principle that in each country, the means of attaining ultimate communist goals must be dictated by the conditions of that particular country rather than by a pattern set in another country. During Josip Broz Tito's era, this specifically meant that the communist goal should be pursued independently of and often in opposition to the policies of the Soviet Union. The term was originally meant as a pejorative and was labeled by Moscow as a heresy during the period of tensions between the Soviet Union and Yugoslavia known as the Informbiro period from 1948 to 1955. The implementation of socialist self-management which to move the managing of companies into the hands of workers and to separate the management from the state. It was also meant to demonstrate the viability of a third way between the capitalist United States and the socialist Soviet Union. From 1949 the central government began to cede power to communal local governments, seeking to decentralise the government and work towards a withering away of the state. Rankovićism disagreed with this decentralisation, viewing it as a threat to the stability of Yugoslavia.

Unlike the rest of Eastern Bloc which fell under Stalin's influence post-World War II, Yugoslavia remained independent from Moscow due to the strong leadership of Tito and the fact that the Yugoslav Partisans liberated Yugoslavia with only limited help from the Red Army.

It became the only country in the Balkans to resist pressure from Moscow to join the Warsaw Pact and remained "socialist, but independent" right up until the collapse of Soviet socialism in the late 1980s and early 1990s. Throughout his time in office, Josip Broz Tito and party leadership took pride in Yugoslavia's independence from the Soviet Bloc, with Yugoslavia never accepting full membership of the Comecon and his open rejection of many aspects of Stalinism as the most obvious manifestations of this.

Although himself not a communist, Muammar Gaddafi's Third International Theory was heavily influenced by Titoism.

=== Ho Chi Minh Thought ===
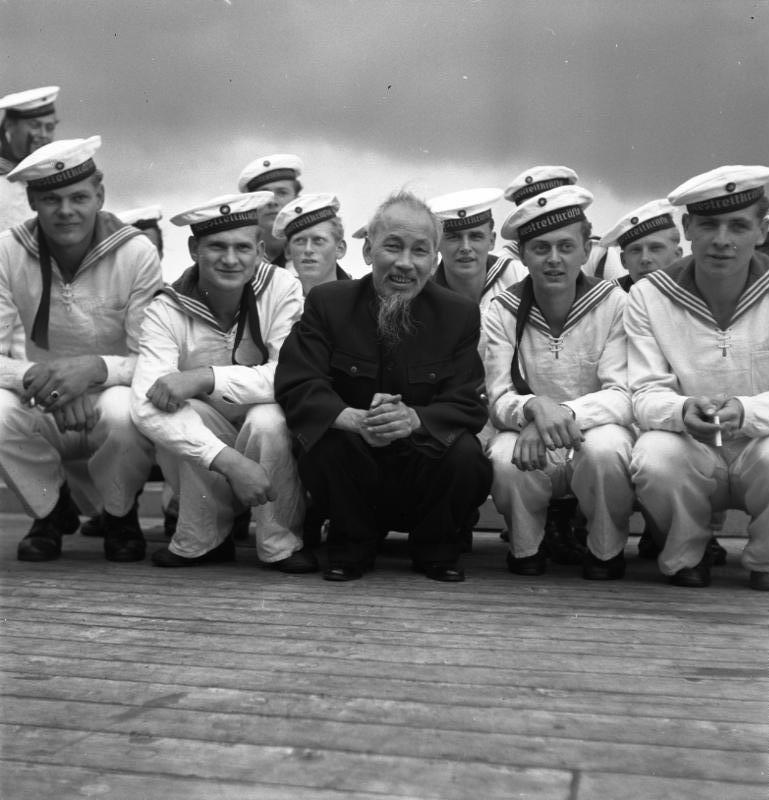
Hồ Chí Minh with East German sailors in Stralsund harbor during his 1957 visit to East Germany

Ho Chi Minh Thought (Vietnamese: Tư tưởng Hồ Chí Minh) is a political philosophy that builds upon Marxism–Leninism and the ideology of Ho Chi Minh. It was developed and codified by the Communist Party of Vietnam and formalised in 1991. The term is used to cover political theories and policies considered as representing a form of Marxism–Leninism that has been adapted to Vietnamese circumstances and history. Whilst the ideology is named after the Vietnamese revolutionary and President, it does not necessarily reflect the personal ideologies of Ho Chi Minh but rather the official ideology of the Communist Party of Vietnam.

As with Maoism, the core of Ho Chi Minh Thought is the belief that the peasantry is the revolutionary vanguard in pre-industrial societies rather than the proletariat. Ho Chi Minh Thought is rooted in:

- Marxism-Leninism
- Traditional Vietnamese ideology and culture
- Eastern cultural thought: Confucianism and Buddhism
- Western ideologies, specifically French and American political philosophy
- Ho Chi Minh's personal morality

=== Castroism ===
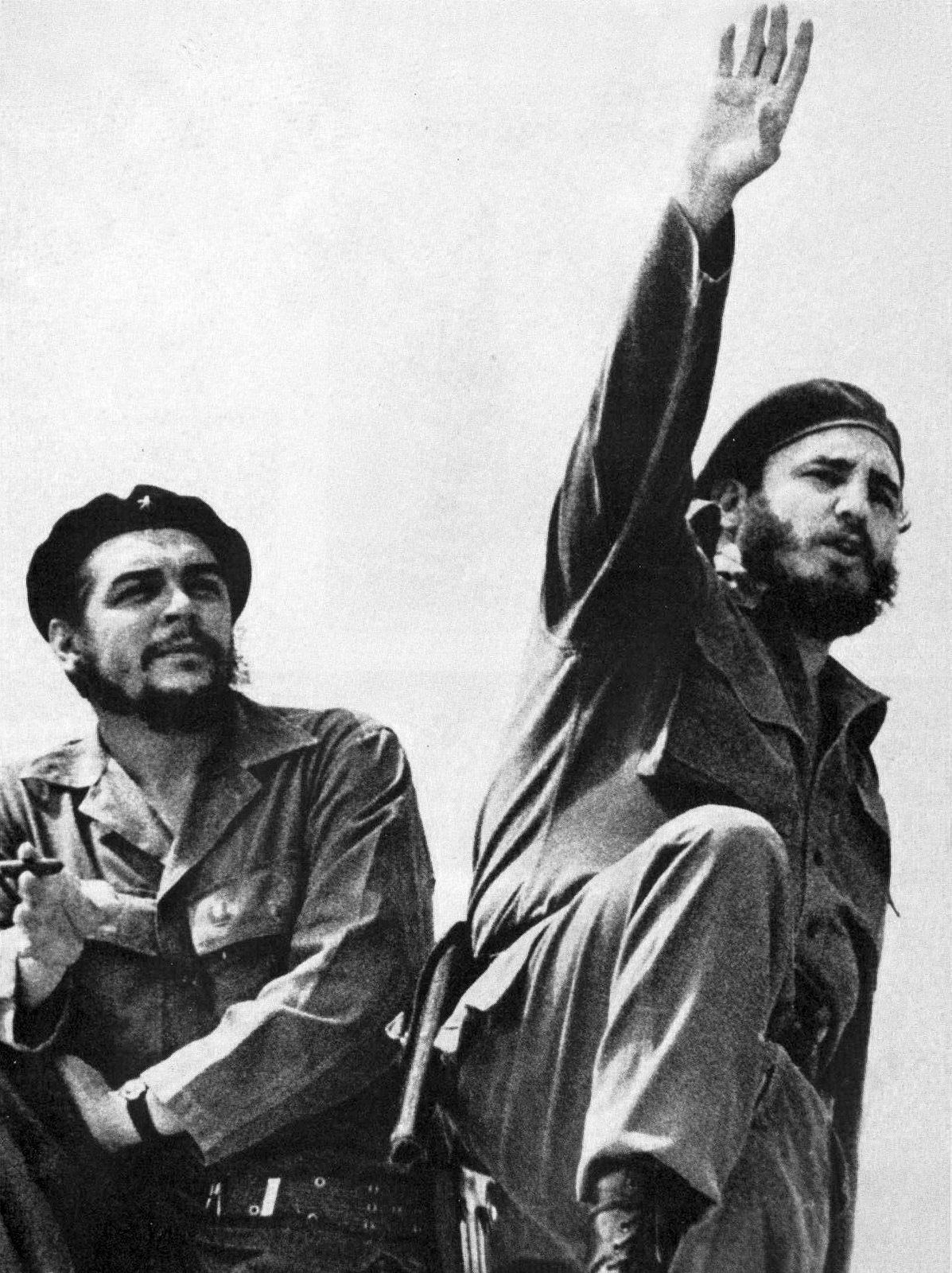
Che Guevara (left) and Fidel Castro (right), photographed by Alberto Korda in 1961.

Castroism refers to the politics followed and enacted by the Communist Party of Cuba under the leadership of Fidel Castro, following a Marxist and a Leninist stance. Castro's political thought was influenced by the Cuban anti-imperialist revolutionary José Martí, Marx, and Hispanidad, a movement that criticized Anglo-Saxon material values and admired the moral values of Spanish and Spanish American culture. Besides Castro's personal thought, the theory of Che Guevara and Jules Régis Debray have also been important influences on Castroism. The Socialist Workers Party in the United States follows a Castroist position.

=== Guevarism ===
Guevarism is a theory of communist revolution and a military strategy of guerrilla warfare associated with Ernesto "Che" Guevara, who believed in the idea of Marxism–Leninism and embraced its principles. From his own experience he developed the foco theory of guerrilla warfare, that took inspiration from the Maoist notion of a "protracted people's war", combined with Guevara's experiences in the Cuban Revolution. When there were "objective conditions" for a revolution in a country, a small "focus" guerrilla as a vanguard could create the "subjective conditions" and unleash a general popular uprising. Guevara provided the details of the guerilla warfare used in Cuba with discussion in his book Guerilla Warfare. Guevara explained that in certain contexts the armed struggle had no place so it was necessary to use peaceful mechanisms such as participation within representative democracy. Although Che stated that this line should be peaceful but "very combative, very brave" and that it could only be abandoned if its orientation in favor of representative democracy was undermined within the population. It was once such means have been exhausted that guerilla warfare should be considered and prepared.

=== Nkrumaism ===
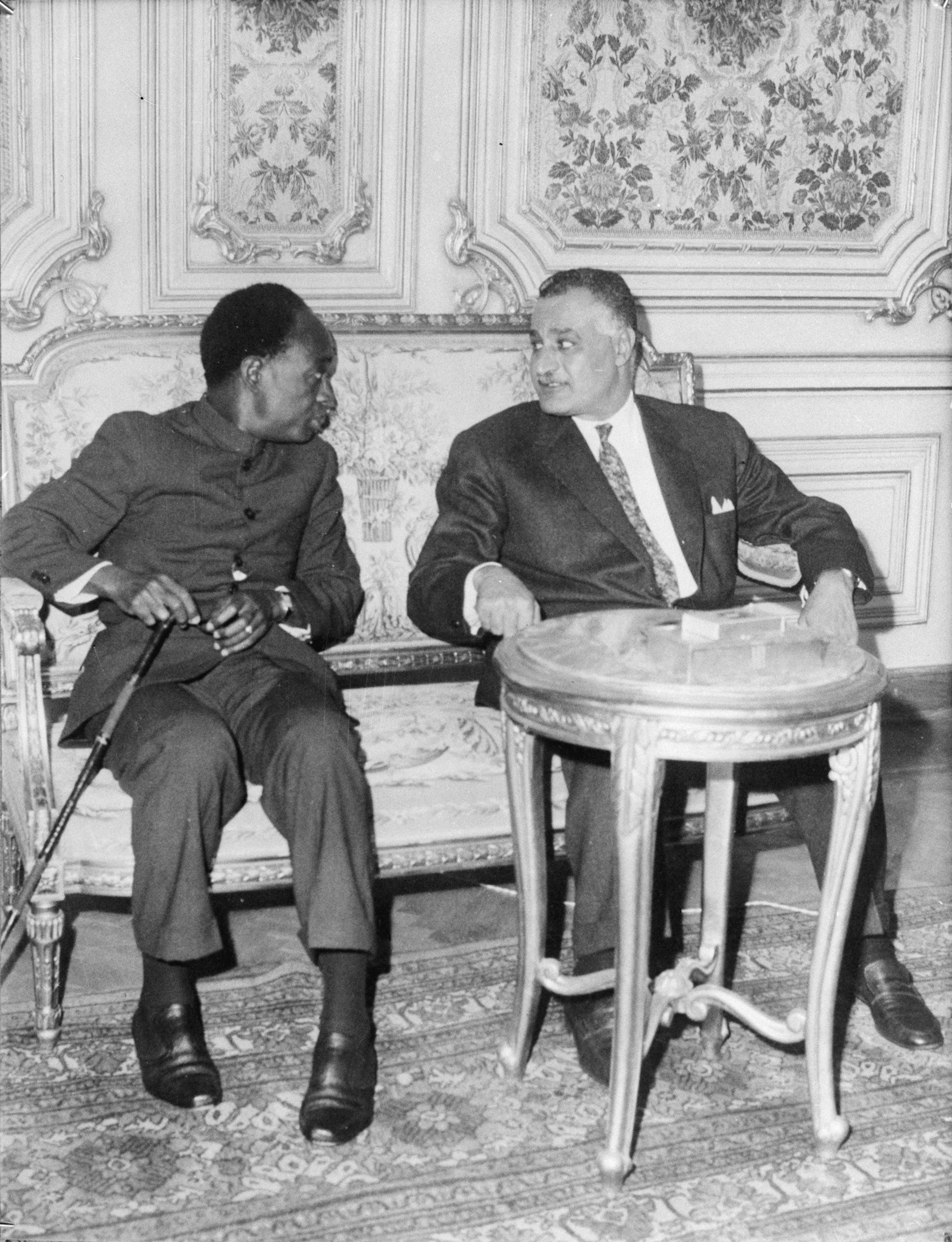
Kwame Nkrumah meeting with Gamal Abdel Nasser in 1966.

Nkrumaism is a pan-African socialist theory which aims to adapt Marxist–Leninist theory to the social context of the African continent. Nkrumah defined his belief system as "the ideology of a New Africa, independent and absolutely free from imperialism, organized on a continental scale, founded upon the conception of one and united Africa, drawing its strength from modern science and technology and from the traditional African belief that the free development of each is the condition for the free development of all." Important influences on Nkrumah's work were different sources from within Africa, the canon of Western philosophy, the works of Marx, Lenin, and black intellectuals in North America and Europe, like Marcus Garvey, George Padmore, C. L. R. James, W. E. B. Du Bois and Father Divine. Aside from the Marxist–Leninist framework, this blending of ideas largely only took bits and pieces of other philosophical systems and even its use of traditional African cultural concepts were often stretched to fit into the larger theory. While a major focus of the ideology was ending colonial relationships on the African continent, many of the ideas were utopian, diverting the scientific nature of the Marxist political analysis which it claims to support.

Like other African political ideologies at the time, the central focus of Nkrumaism was on decolonization across Africa. Nkrumah rejected the idealized view of pre-colonial African societies that were classless or non-hierarchical, but accepted that Africa had a spirit of communalism and humanism. Nkrumaism then argued that a return to these values through socialist political structures would both heal the disruption caused by colonial structures and allow further development of African societies. The pan-African aspects of Nkrumah's ideology were justified by a claim that all African societies had a community of economic life and that in contradiction to the neocolonial structures that replaced formal colonies, only African unity would create real autonomy. While Nkrumah believed in the materialism and economic determinism of Marxism, he argued that focusing on the economic system was only appropriate after achieving independence throughout Africa and that the political struggle was the first order in colonial and neocolonial contexts.

=== Sankarism ===
Sankarism is a description of the policies enacted and positions held by the government of Thomas Sankara in Burkina Faso. Ideologically, Sankara was a pan-Africanist, anti-imperialist and a communist who studied the works of Marx and Lenin, who sought to reclaim the African identity of his nation and opposed neocolonialism. During his time in power he attempted to bring about what he called the "Democratic and Popular Revolution" (French: Révolution démocratique et populaire), a radical transformation of society with a focus on self-sufficiency. A number of organizations were formed to implement this revolution, among them the Committees for the Defense of the Revolution, the Popular Revolutionary Tribunals and the Pioneers of the Revolution. A vast number of reforms were enacted in Burkina Faso between 1983 and 1987, including mass vaccination programs, reforestation, elimination of slums through new housing developments, and the development of national infrastructure such as railway networks.

There is a strong political dissonance between the movements in modern Burkina Faso which ascribe to Sankara's political legacy and ideals, a fact which the Burkinabé opposition politician Bénéwendé Stanislas Sankara (no relation) described in 2001 as being "due to a lack of definition of the concept." The "Sankarists" range from communists and socialists to nationalists and populists. The Economic Freedom Fighters (EFF) of South Africa, founded in 2013 by Julius Malema, claim to take significant inspiration from Sankara in terms of both style and ideology.

=== Khrushchevism ===
Khrushchevism was a form of Marxism–Leninism which consisted of the theories and policies of Nikita Khrushchev and his administration in the Soviet Union, through de-Stalinisation, liberal tolerance of some cultural dissent and deviance, and a more welcoming international relations policy and attitude towards foreigners.

=== Kadarism ===
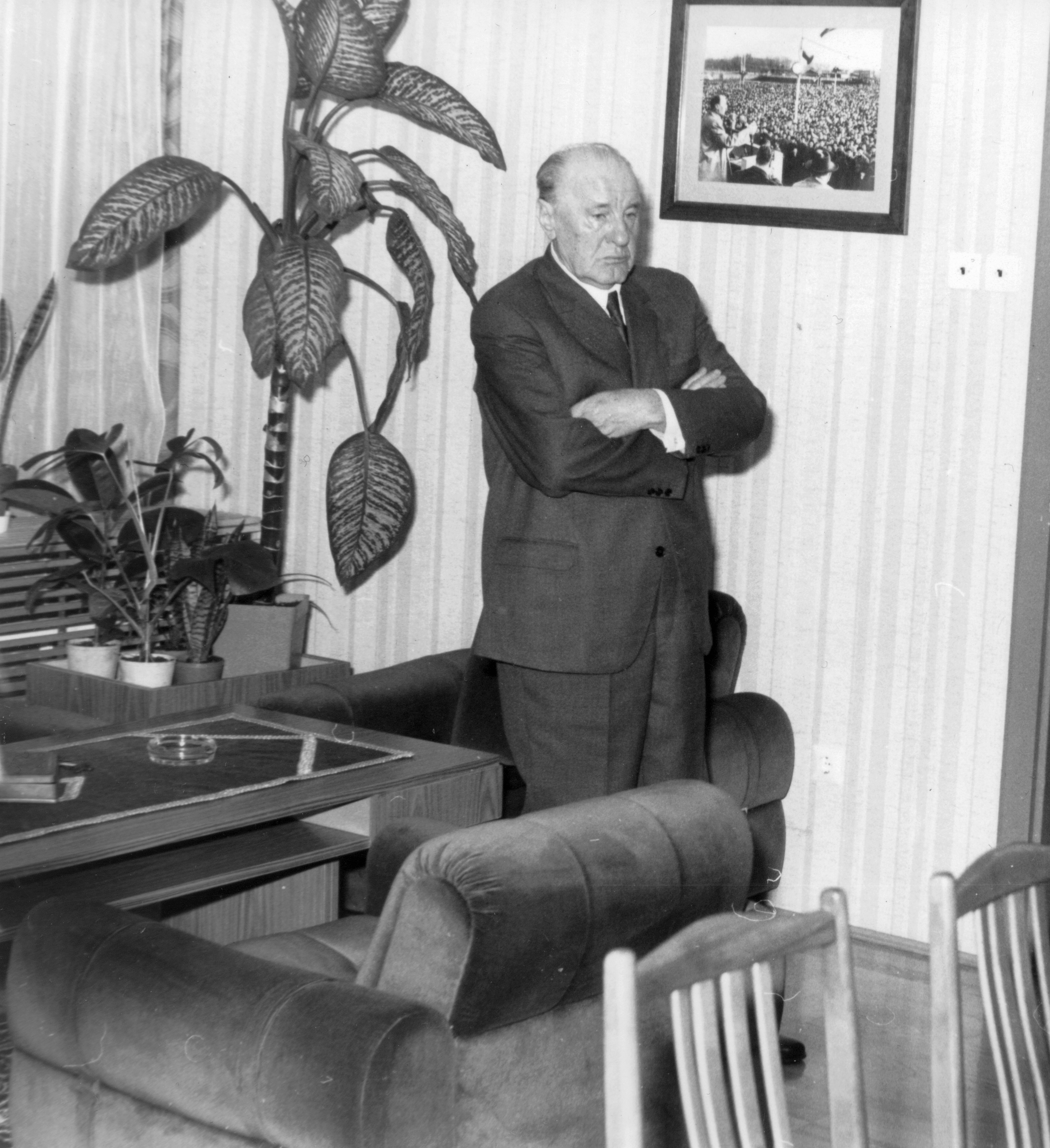
János Kádár, General Secretary of the Hungarian Socialist Workers' Party from 1956 to 1988.

Kadarism (Hungarian: kádárizmus), also commonly called Goulash Communism or the Hungarian Thaw, is the variety of socialism in Hungary following the Hungarian Revolution of 1956. János Kádár and the Hungarian People's Republic imposed policies with the goal to create high-quality living standards for the people of Hungary coupled with economic reforms. These reforms fostered a sense of well-being and relative cultural freedom in Hungary with the reputation of being "the happiest barracks" of the Eastern Bloc during the 1960s to the 1970s. With elements of regulated market economics as well as an improved human rights record, it represented a quiet reform and deviation from the Stalinist principles applied to Hungary in the previous decade. This period of "pseudo-consumerism" saw an increase of foreign affairs and consumption of consumer goods as well.

Kadarism came from a background of Imre Nagy's "Reform Communism" (1955–1956), where he argues that Marxism is a "science that cannot remain static but must develop and become more perfect". Official policy employed different methods of administering the collectives in Hungarian society, leaving the pace of mechanization up to each separately. Additionally, rather than enforcing the system of compulsory crop deliveries and of workdays credit the collectivizers used monthly cash wages. Later in the 1960s, cooperatives were permitted to enter into related and then general auxiliary businesses such as food processing, light industry and service industry.

=== Husakism ===
Husakism (Czech: husákismus; Slovak: husákizmus) is an ideology connected with the politician Gustáv Husák of Communist Czechoslovakia which describes his policies of "normalization" and federalism, while following a neo-Stalinist line. This was the state ideology of Czechoslovakia from about 1969 to about 1989, formulated by Husák, Vasil Biľak and others.

=== Kaysone Phomvihane Thought ===
Kaysone Phomvihane Thought (Lao: ແນວຄິດ ໄກສອນ ພົມວິຫານ) builds upon Marxism–Leninism and Ho Chi Minh Thought with the political philosophy developed by Kaysone Phomvihane, the first leader of the Communist Lao People's Revolutionary Party (LPRP). It was formalised by the LPRP at its 10th National Congress in 2016.

== Other Marxist-based ideologies ==
=== Libertarian Marxism ===
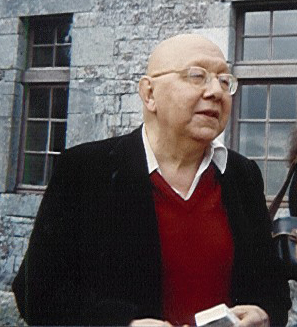
Cornelius Castoriadis, theorist of the group Socialisme ou Barbarie, a prominent libertarian Marxist group in France.

Libertarian Marxism is a broad scope of economic and political philosophies that emphasize the anti-authoritarian and libertarian aspects of Marxism. Early currents of libertarian Marxism such as left communism emerged in opposition to Marxism–Leninism. Libertarian Marxism is often critical of reformist positions such as those held by social democrats. Libertarian Marxist currents often draw from Karl Marx and Friedrich Engels' later works, specifically the Grundrisse and The Civil War in France; emphasizing the Marxist belief in the ability of the working class to forge its own destiny without the need for state or vanguard party to mediate or aid its liberation. Along with anarchism, libertarian Marxism is one of the main currents of libertarian socialism.

Libertarian Marxism includes currents such as autonomism, council communism, De Leonism, Lettrism, parts of the New Left, Situationism, Freudo-Marxism (a form of psychoanalysis), Socialisme ou Barbarie and workerism. Libertarian Marxism has often had an influence on both post-left and social anarchists. Notable theorists of libertarian Marxism have included Maurice Brinton, Cornelius Castoriadis, Guy Debord, Raya Dunayevskaya, Daniel Guérin, C. L. R. James, Rosa Luxemburg, William Morris, Antonio Negri, Antonie Pannekoek, Fredy Perlman, Ernesto Screpanti, E. P. Thompson, Raoul Vaneigem, and Yanis Varoufakis, the latter claiming that Marx himself was a libertarian Marxist.

=== Austro-Marxism ===
Austro-Marxism was a school of Marxist thought centered in Vienna that existed from the beginning of the 20th century until the 1930s. Its most eminent proponents were Max Adler, Otto Bauer, Rudolf Hilferding and Karl Renner. It was influenced by contemporaneous intellectual trends, including the prominence of neo-Kantianism and positivism in philosophy and the emergence of marginalism in economics. The group confronted issues such as the problem of the National Question within the Austro-Hungarian Empire, the rise of the interventionist state and the changing class-structure of early 20th century capitalist societies.

=== Left communism ===
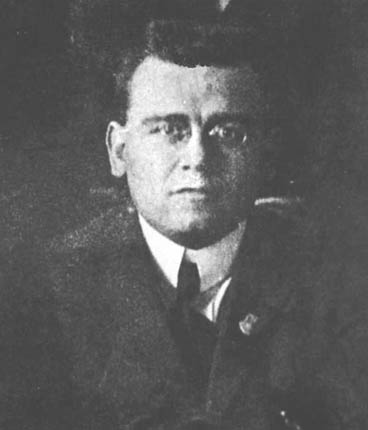
Amadeo Bordiga

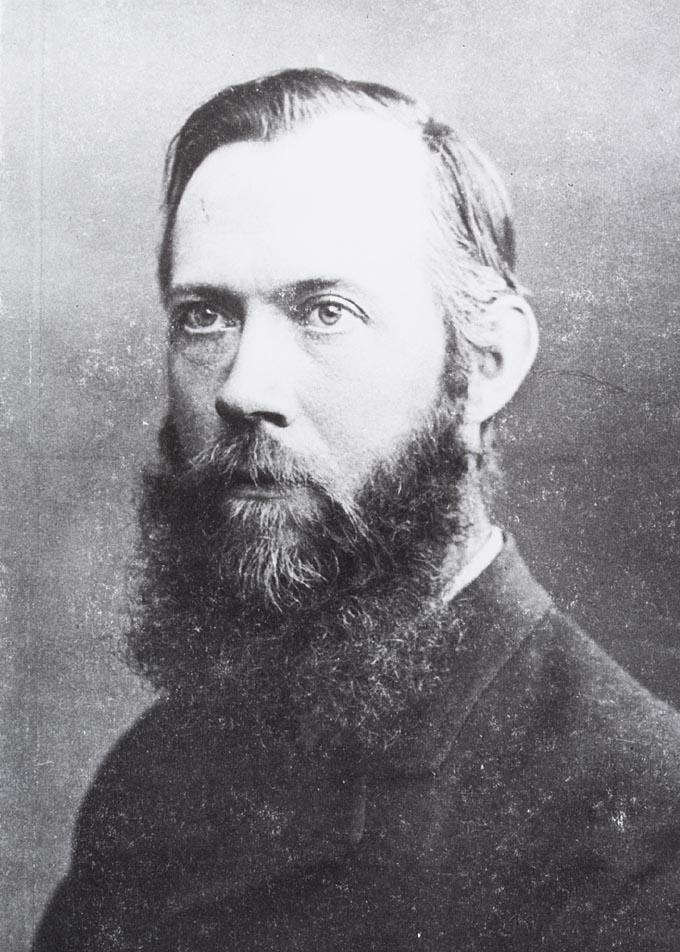
Antonie Pannekoek

Left communism, or the communist left, is a position held by the left-wing of communism, which criticises the political ideas and practices espoused by Marxist–Leninists and social democrats. Left communists assert positions which they regard as more authentically Marxist than the views of Marxism–Leninism espoused by the Communist International after its Bolshevisation by Joseph Stalin and during its second congress.

In general, there are two currents of left communism, namely the Italian and Dutch–German left. The communist left in Italy was formed during World War I in organizations like the Italian Socialist Party and the Communist Party of Italy. The Italian left considers itself to be Leninist in nature, but denounces Marxism–Leninism as a form of bourgeois opportunism materialized in the Soviet Union under Stalin. The Italian left is currently embodied in organizations such as the Internationalist Communist Party and the International Communist Party. The Dutch–German left split from Lenin prior to Stalin's rule and supports a firmly council communist and libertarian Marxist viewpoint as opposed to the Italian left which emphasised the need for an international revolutionary party.

Although she lived before left communism became a distinct tendency, Luxemburg has been heavily influential for most left communists, both politically and theoretically. Proponents of left communism have included Herman Gorter, Antonie Pannekoek, Otto Rühle, Karl Korsch, Amadeo Bordiga and Paul Mattick. Later prominent theorists are shared with other tendencies such as Antonio Negri, a founding theorist of the autonomist tendency. Prominent left communist groups existing today include the International Communist Current and the Internationalist Communist Tendency. Specific currents that can be labelled part of left communism include Bordigism, Damenism, Luxemburgism, and Communization.

=== Ultra-leftism ===
The term ultra-leftism in English, when used among Marxist groups, is often a pejorative for certain types of positions on the far-left that are extreme or uncompromising, with the Communist International applying the term to council communists due to Lenin's critique of left communism.

The French ultra-gauche, has a stronger meaning in that language and is used to define a movement that still exists today: a branch of left communism developed from theorists such as Bordiga, Rühle, Pannekoek, Gorter, and Mattick, and continuing with more recent writers, such as Jacques Camatte and Gilles Dauvé. This standpoint includes two main traditions, a Dutch-German tradition including Rühle, Pannekoek, Gorter, and Mattick, and an Italian tradition following Bordiga. These traditions came together in the 1960s French ultra-gauche.

=== Shachtmanism ===
Shachtmanism is the form of Marxism developed by the American theorist Max Shachtman. Its two major components are a bureaucratic collectivist analysis of the Soviet Union and a third camp approach to world politics. Shachtmanites believe that the Stalinist leaders of proclaimed socialist countries are a new ruling class distinct from the workers and reject Trotsky's description of Stalinist Russia as a "degenerated workers' state". Shachtmanism developed into three separate currents; left Shachtmanism, social democratic Shachtmanism, and libertarian Shachtmanism.

=== Autonomism ===
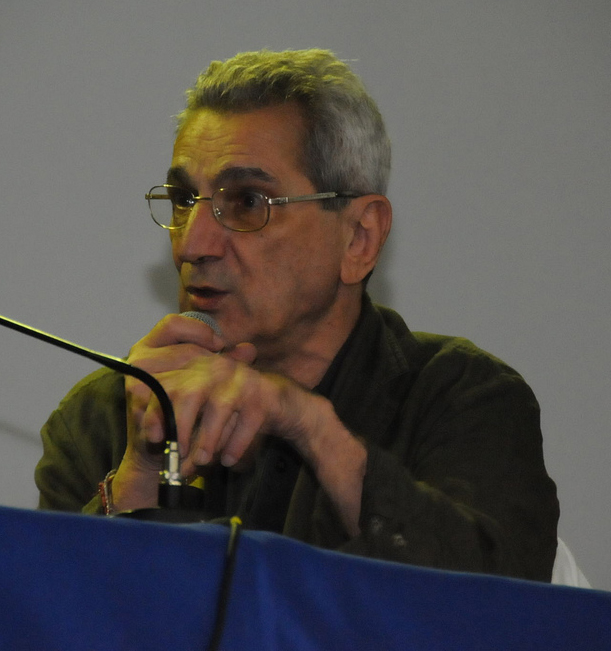
Antonio Negri, a leading theorist of Italian autonomism.

Autonomism is a Marxist-based anti-capitalist left-wing political and social movement and theory. As a theoretical system, it first emerged in Italy in the 1960s from workerism (operaismo). Later, post-Marxist and anarchist tendencies became significant after influence from the Situationists, the failure of Italian far-left movements in the 1970s, and the emergence of a number of important theorists including Antonio Negri, who had contributed to the 1969 founding of Potere Operaio as well as Mario Tronti, Paolo Virno, Sergio Bologna and Franco "Bifo" Berardi. These early theorists developed notions of "immaterial" and "social labour", which broaden the definition of the working-class to include salaried and unpaid labour, such as skilled professions and housework, this extended the Marxist concept of labour to all society. They suggested that modern society's wealth was produced by unaccountable collective work, which in advanced capitalist states as the primary force of change in the construct of capital, and that only a little of this was redistributed to the workers in the form of wages. Other theorists including Mariarosa Dalla Costa and Silvia Federici emphasised the importance of feminism and the value of unpaid female labour to capitalist society, adding these to the theory of Autonomism. Negri and Michael Hardt argue that network power constructs are the most effective methods of organization against the neoliberal regime of accumulation and predict a massive shift in the dynamics of capital into a 21st century empire. Harry Cleaver is an autonomist and Marxist theoretician, who authored Reading Capital Politically, an autonomist reading of Marx's Capital.

=== Western Marxism ===
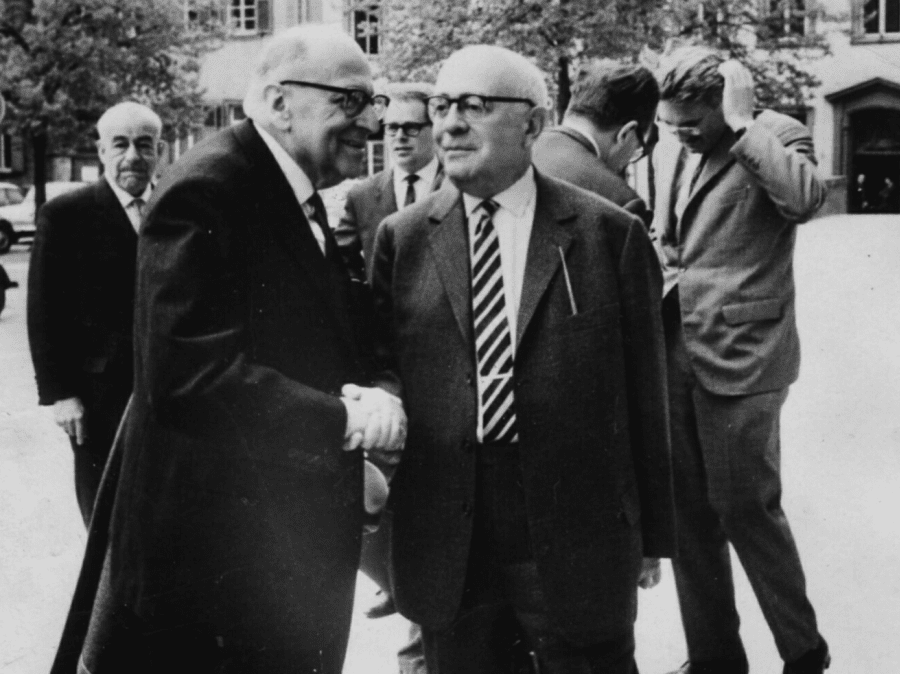
Max Horkheimer, Theodor W. Adorno, and Jürgen Habermas, members of the Frankfurt School at an academic conference in 1964.

Western Marxism is a current of Marxist theory that arose from Western and Central Europe in the aftermath of the 1917 October Revolution in Russia and the ascent of Leninism. The term denotes a loose collection of Marxist theorists who emphasize culture, philosophy, and art, in contrast to the Marxism of the Soviet Union. Notable figures in this tradition include György Lukács, Karl Korsch, Antonio Gramsci, Herbert Marcuse, Jean-Paul Sartre, Louis Althusser, and the members of the Frankfurt School.

=== Eurocommunism ===
Eurocommunism was a revisionist trend in the 1970s and 1980s within various western European communist parties which said they had developed a theory and practice of social transformation more relevant for western Europe. During the Cold War, they sought to undermine the influence of the Soviet Union and the Communist Party of the Soviet Union in western Europe. It was especially prominent in France, Italy and Spain.

Since the early 1970s, the term Eurocommunism was used to refer to the ideology of moderate, reformist communist parties in western Europe, where they emphasised the importance of democracy and personal freedoms. These parties did not support the Soviet Union and denounced its policies. Such parties were politically active and electorally significant in France, Italy and Spain.

=== Luxemburgism ===
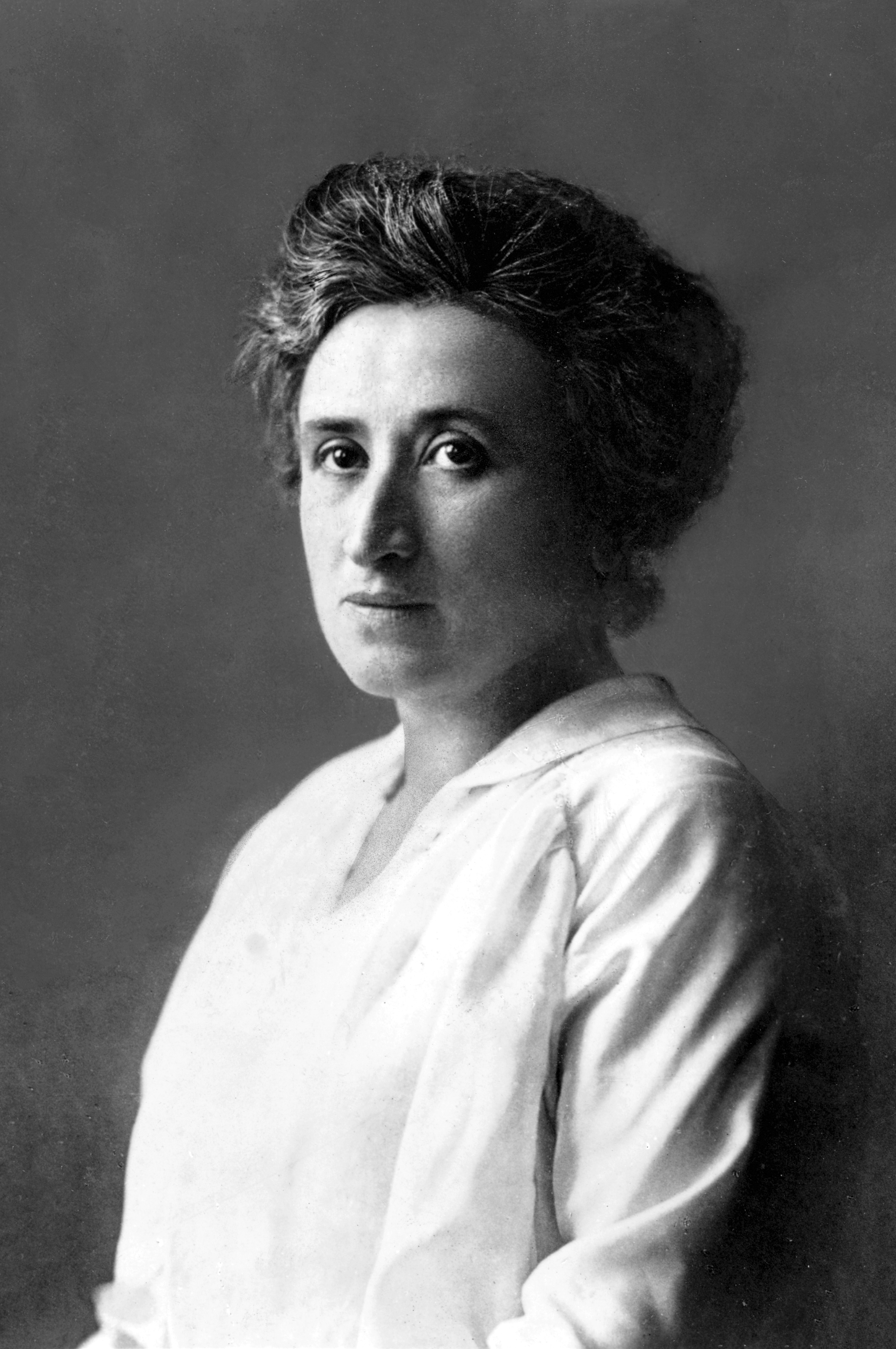
Rosa Luxemburg

Luxemburgism is a specific revolutionary theory within Marxism and communism-based on the writings of Rosa Luxemburg. Luxemburg was critical of undemocratic tendencies present in the Leninist schools of thought as well as being critical of the reformist Marxism that emerged from the work of Eduard Bernstein's informal faction of the Social Democratic Party of Germany. According to Rosa Luxemburg, under reformism "[capitalism] is not overthrown, but is on the contrary strengthened by the development of social reforms". Luxemburgism sees spontaneism as a natural and important force, where organisation is not a product of scientific-theoretic insight to historical imperatives, but is product of the working classes' struggles, which emerges as a response to mounting contradictions between the productive forces and social relations of society. This was built from Luxemburg's analysis of mass strikes seen in Germany and Russia in the early 20th century. Though she also wrote of the failings in trade unionism at the time due to the conservative function of trade-union bureaucracy hampering the socialist potential of trade-unionism. Ernest Mandel, a Marxian economist, has been characterised as Luxemburgist due to his commitment to socialist democracy.

=== Council communism ===
Council communism is a movement originating from Germany and the Netherlands in the 1920s. The Communist Workers' Party of Germany (KAPD) was the primary organization that espoused council communism. Council communism continues today as a theoretical and activist position within both Marxism and libertarian socialism, through a few groups in Europe and North America. As such, it is referred to as anti-authoritarian and anti-Leninist Marxism.

In contrast to reformist social democracy and to Leninism, the central argument of council communism is that democratic workers councils arising in factories and municipalities are the natural form of working class organisation and governmental power. The government and the economy should be managed by workers' councils composed of delegates elected at workplaces and recallable at any moment. As such, council communists oppose authoritarian socialism, and command economies such as state socialism and state capitalism. They also oppose the idea of a revolutionary party since council communists believe that a party-led revolution will necessarily produce a party dictatorship. This view is also opposed to the social democratic and Marxist–Leninist ideologies, with their stress on parliaments and institutional government (i.e. by applying social reforms) on the one hand and vanguard parties and participative democratic centralism on the other. Council communists see the mass strike and new yet to emerge forms of mass action as revolutionary means to achieve a communist society. Where the network of worker councils would be the main vehicle for revolution, acting as the apparatus by which the dictatorship of the proletariat forms and operates. Council communism and other types of libertarian Marxism such as autonomism are often viewed as being similar to anarchism due to similar criticisms of Leninist ideologies for being authoritarian and the rejection of the idea of a vanguard party.

=== De Leonism ===
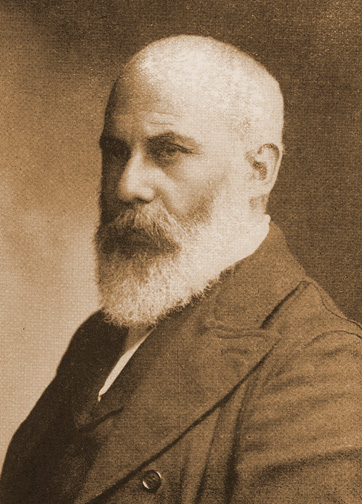
Daniel De Leon in 1902.

De Leonism is a form of Marxism developed by the American activist Daniel De Leon. De Leon was an early leader of the first socialist political party in the United States, the Socialist Labor Party of America. De Leon combined the rising theories of syndicalism in his time with orthodox Marxism.

De Leonism lies outside the Leninist tradition of communism. The highly decentralized and democratic nature of the proposed De Leonist government is in contrast to the democratic centralism of Marxism–Leninism and what they see as the dictatorial nature of the Soviet Union. The success of the De Leonist plan depends on achieving majority support among the people both in the workplaces and at the polls, in contrast to the Leninist notion that a small vanguard party should lead the working class to carry out the revolution. De Leonism believes that the revolution will be brought about through revolutionary industrial action, organised through industrial unionism, and that the political efforts of a workers party should be subservient to the industrial action of the union. De Leon and other De Leonist writers have issued frequent polemics against democratic socialist movements—especially the Socialist Party of America—and consider them to be reformist or bourgeois socialist. De Leonism spread with the idea of industrial unionism to various countries including Ireland (via James Connolly), the UK, and South Africa.

De Leonists have traditionally refrained from any activity or alliances viewed by them as trying to reform capitalism, though the Socialist Labor Party in De Leon's time was active during strikes.

=== Situationism ===
The Situationist International was an international organization of social revolutionaries made up of avant-garde artists, intellectuals, and political theorists. It was prominent in Europe from its formation in 1957 to its dissolution in 1972. The intellectual foundations of the Situationist International were derived primarily from libertarian Marxism and the avant-garde art movements of the early 20th century, particularly Dada and Surrealism. Guy Debord was a key theorist in the development of situationism. Overall, situationist theory represented an attempt to synthesize this diverse field of theoretical disciplines into a modern and comprehensive critique of mid-20th century advanced capitalism.

Essential to situationist theory was the concept of the spectacle, a unified critique of advanced capitalism of which a primary concern was the progressively increasing tendency towards the expression and mediation of social relations through objects. The situationists believed that the shift from individual expression through directly lived experiences, or the first-hand fulfillment of authentic desires, to individual expression by proxy through the exchange or consumption of commodities, or passive second-hand alienation, inflicted significant and far-reaching damage to the quality of human life for both individuals and society. Another important concept of situationist theory was the primary means of counteracting the spectacle; the construction of situations, moments of life deliberately constructed for the purpose of reawakening and pursuing authentic desires, experiencing the feeling of life and adventure, and the liberation of everyday life.

The situationists recognized that capitalism had changed since Marx's formative writings, but maintained that his analysis of the capitalist mode of production remained fundamentally correct; they rearticulated and expanded upon several classical Marxist concepts, such as his theory of alienation. In their expanded interpretation of Marxist theory, the situationists asserted that the misery of social alienation and commodity fetishism were no longer limited to the fundamental components of capitalist society, but had now in advanced capitalism spread themselves to every aspect of life and culture. They rejected the idea that advanced capitalism's apparent successes—such as technological advancement, increased productive capacity, and a raised general quality of life when compared to previous systems, such as feudalism—could ever outweigh the social dysfunction and degradation of everyday life that it simultaneously inflicted.

=== Impossibilism ===
Impossibilism is a Marxist theory that stresses the limited value of political, economic, and social reforms under capitalism. As a doctrine, impossibilism views the pursuit of such reforms as counterproductive to the goal of achieving socialism as they stabilize, and therefore strengthen, support for capitalism. Impossibilism holds that reforms to capitalism are irrelevant or outright counter-productive to the goal of achieving socialism and should not be a major focus of socialist politics.

Impossibilists insist that socialists should primarily or solely focus on structural changes (sometimes termed "revolutionary changes") to society as opposed to advancing social reforms. Impossibilists argue that spontaneous revolutionary action is the only viable method of instituting the structural changes necessary for the construction of socialism; impossibilism is thus held in contrast to reformist socialist parties that aim to rally support for socialism through the implementation of popular social reforms (such as a welfare state). It is also held in contrast to those who believe that socialism can emerge through gradual economic reforms implemented by an elected social democratic political party, as well as being held in contrast to possibilism, where socialists who followed possibilism sounded and acted little different from non-socialist reformers in practice.

=== Marxist feminism ===
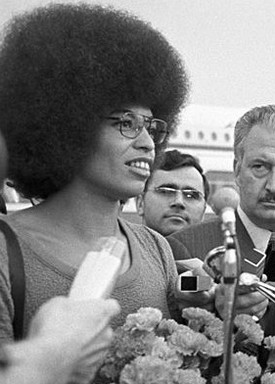
Angela Davis, a well known Marxist feminist on her 1972 visit to Moscow

Marxist feminism is a philosophical variant of feminism that incorporates and extends Marxist theory, focusing on the dismantling of capitalism as a way to liberate women. Marxist feminism analyzes the ways in which women are exploited through capitalism and the individual ownership of private property, stating that these give rise to economic inequality as well as dependence, political confusion and ultimately unhealthy social relations between men and women, which are the root of women's oppression. According to Marxist feminists, women's liberation can only be achieved by dismantling the capitalist systems in which they contend much of women's labor is uncompensated. Marxist feminists extend traditional Marxist analysis by applying it to unpaid domestic labor and sex relations.

According to Marxist theory, in capitalist societies the individual is shaped by class relations—that is people's capacities, needs and interests are seen to be determined by the mode of production that characterises the society they inhabit. Marxist feminists see gender inequality as determined ultimately by the capitalist mode of production, with gender oppression and women's subordination seen as class oppression which is maintained (like racism) because it serves the interests of capital and the ruling class. Because of its foundation in historical materialism, Marxist feminism is similar to socialist feminism and, to a greater degree, materialist feminism. The latter two place greater emphasis on what they consider the "reductionist limitations" of Marxist theory but, as Martha E. Gimenez notes in her exploration of the differences between Marxist and materialist feminism, "clear lines of theoretical demarcation between and within these two umbrella terms are somewhat difficult to establish."

=== Marxist humanism ===
Marxist humanism is an international body of thought and political action rooted in an interpretation of Marx's earlier writings. It is an investigation into "what human nature consists of and what sort of society would be most conducive to human thriving" from a critical perspective rooted in Marxist philosophy. Marxist humanists argue that Marx himself was concerned with investigating similar questions.

Marxist humanism was born in 1932 with the publication of Marx's Economic and Philosophic Manuscripts of 1844 and reached a degree of prominence in the 1950s and 1960s. Marxist humanists contend that there is continuity between the early philosophical writings of Marx, in which he develops his theory of alienation, and the structural description of capitalist society found in his later works such as Das Kapital. They hold that it is necessary to grasp Marx's philosophical foundations to understand his later works properly. Marxist humanism was opposed by Louis Althusser's "antihumanism", who qualified it as a revisionist movement.

== Non-Marxist communism ==
The most widely held forms of communist theory are derived from Marxism, but non-Marxist versions of communism also exist.

=== Primitive communism ===
Primitive communism is a way of describing the gift economies of hunter-gatherers throughout history, where resources and property hunted and gathered are shared with all members of a group, in accordance with individual needs. In political sociology and anthropology, the concept is often credited to Marx and Engels, who wrote that hunter-gatherer societies were traditionally based on egalitarian social relations and common ownership. A primary inspiration for both Marx and Engels was Lewis H. Morgan's description of "communism in living" as practised by the Haudenosaunee of North America. In Marx's model of socioeconomic structures, societies with primitive communism had no hierarchical social class structures or capital accumulation.

=== Anarchist communism ===
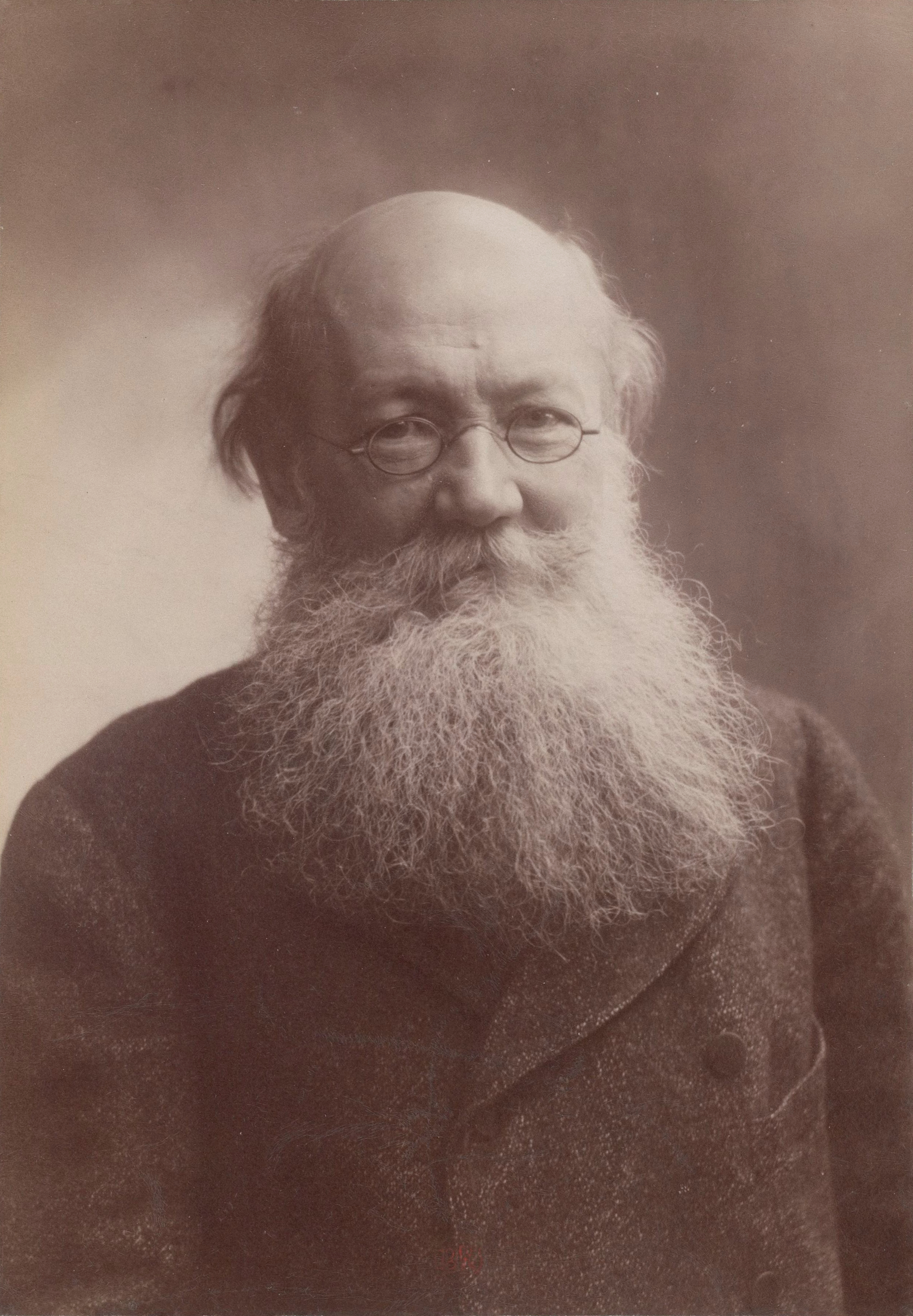
Peter Kropotkin,one of the principle theorists of anarchist communism in the 19th and early-20th century.

Some of Marx's contemporaries espoused similar ideas, but differed in their views of how to reach to a classless society. Following the split between those associated with Marx and Mikhail Bakunin at the First International, the anarchists formed the International Workers Association. Anarchists argued that capitalism and the state were inseparable and that one could not be abolished without the other. Anarcho-communists such as Peter Kropotkin theorized an immediate transition to one society with no classes. Anarcho-syndicalism, similar to anarcho-communism, became one of the dominant forms of anarchist organization, arguing that labor unions are the organizations that can change society as opposed to communist parties. Consequently, many anarchists have been in opposition to Marxist communism to this day. Important theorists to anarcho-communism include Alexander Berkman, Murray Bookchin, Noam Chomsky, Errico Malatesta, Emma Goldman, Ricardo Flores Magón, and Nestor Makhno. Three prominent organizational forms seen in anarcho-communism are insurrectionary anarchism, platformism, and synthesis federations.

=== Communist Bundism ===
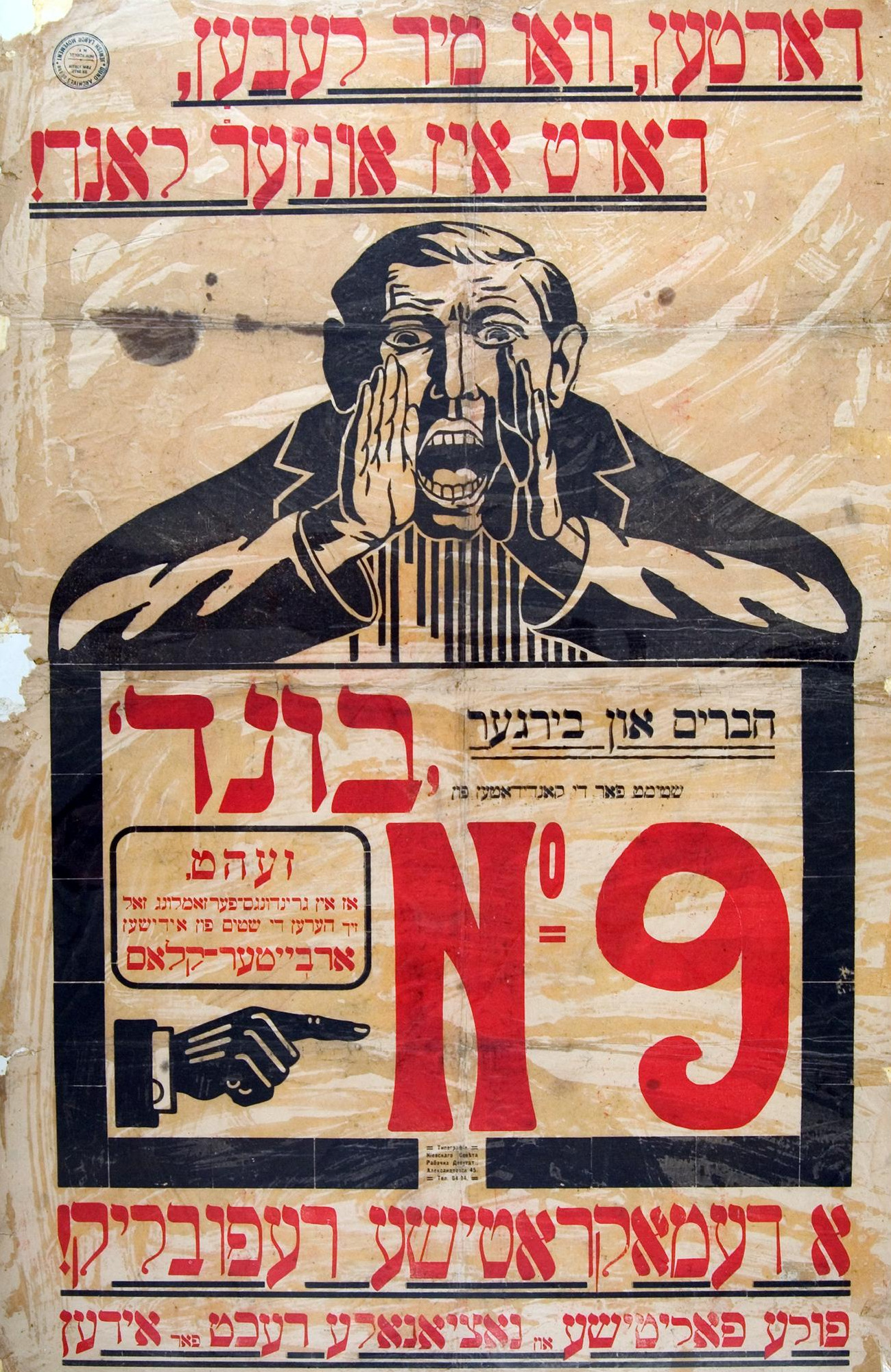
1917 election poster of the General Jewish Labour Bund. Heading: "Where we live, there is our country!" Inside frame: "Vote List 9, Bund". Bottom: "A democratic republic! Full national and political rights for Jews!"

Bundism was a secular Jewish socialist movement whose organizational manifestation was the General Jewish Labour Bund in Lithuania, Poland and Russia (Yiddish: אַלגעמײַנער ײדישער אַרבעטער בּונד אין ליטע פוילין און רוסלאַנד, romanized: Algemeyner Yidisher Arbeter Bund in Liteh, Poyln un Rusland), founded in the Russian Empire in 1897. The Jewish Labour Bund was an important component of the social democratic movement in the Russian Empire until the 1917 Russian Revolution; the Bundists initially opposed the October Revolution, but ended up supporting it due to pogroms committed by the Volunteer Army of the anti-communist White movement during the Russian Civil War. Split along communist and social democratic lines throughout the Civil War, where the communist faction supported the Bolsheviks and eventually was absorbed by the Communist Party of the Soviet Union. Similar splits occurred in the Bundist organisations of other eastern European countries, where the revolutionary communist factions formed the Kombund, and supported organising with other communist groups.

Bundism opposed Zionism, arguing that emigration to Palestine was a form of escapism. Bundism focused on culture, rather than a state or a place, as the glue of Jewish "nationalism." In this they borrowed extensively from the Austro-Marxist school. It also promoted the use of Yiddish as a Jewish national language and to some extent opposed the Zionist project of reviving Hebrew. Bundism was an influential strain that found a place in the socialist and communist movements of other countries as far away as South Africa.

=== Religious communism ===
Religious communism is a form of communism that incorporates religious principles. Scholars have used the term to describe a variety of social or religious movements throughout history that have favored the common ownership of property.

==== Christian communism ====
Christian communism is a form of religious communism centered on Christianity. It is a theological and political theory based upon the view that the teachings of Jesus Christ urge Christians to support communism as the ideal social system. Christian communists trace the origins of their practice to teachings in the New Testament, such as this one from Acts of the Apostles at chapter 2 and verses 42, 44 and 45:

42. And they continued steadfastly in the apostles' doctrine and in fellowship [...] 44. And all that believed were together, and had all things in common; 45. And sold their possessions and goods, and parted them to all men, as every man had need. (King James Version)

Christian communism can be seen as a radical form of Christian socialism and because many Christian communists have formed independent stateless communes in the past, there is also a link between Christian communism and Christian anarchism. Christian communists may or may not agree with various parts of Marxism. Christian communists also share some of the political goals of Marxists, for example replacing capitalism with socialism, which should in turn be followed by communism at a later point in the future. However, Christian communists sometimes disagree with Marxists (and particularly with Leninists) on the way a socialist or communist society should be organized.

Various communistic Christian communities and movements have included the Dulcinians led by Fra Dolcino, the Anabaptist communist movement led by Thomas Müntzer during the German Peasants' War, the Diggers and the Levellers of the English Civil War, and the Shakers of the 18th century.

==== Islamic communism ====
Researchers have commented on the communistic nature of the society built by the Qarmatians around Al-Ahsa from the 9th to 10th centuries.

Islamic Marxism attempts to apply Marxist economic, political, and social teachings within an Islamic framework. An affinity between Marxist and Islamic ideals of social justice has led some Muslims to embrace their own forms of Marxism since the 1940s. Islamic Marxists believe that Islam meets the needs of society and can accommodate or guide the social changes Marxism hopes to accomplish. Islamic Marxists are also dismissive of traditional Marxist views on materialism and religion.

=== Juche ===
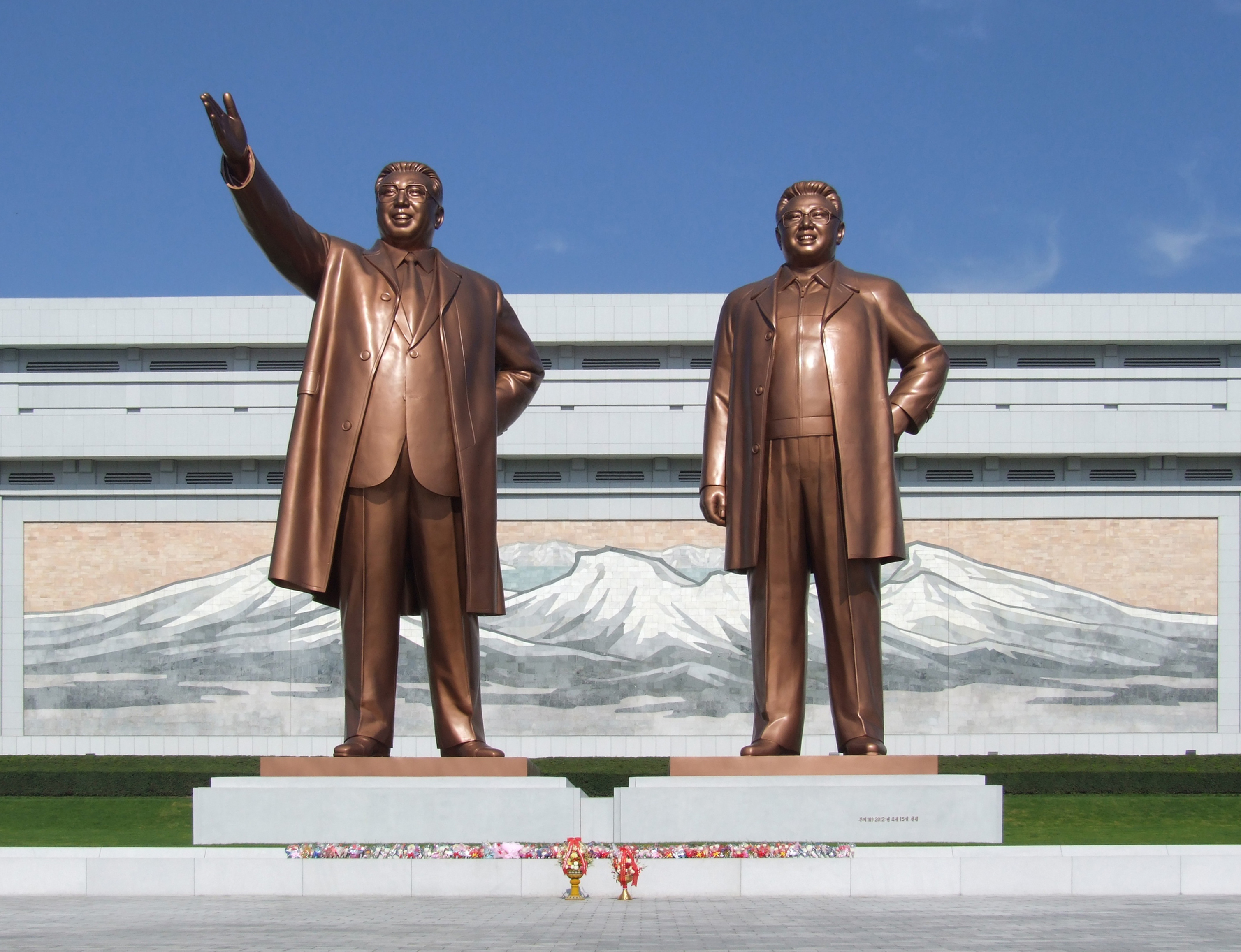
The Mansudae Grand Monuments, depicting large bronze statues of Kim Il Sung and his son Kim Jong Il.

In 1992, Juche replaced Marxism-Leninism in the revised North Korean constitution as the official state ideology. Juche is claimed to be developed from dialectical materialism, with Kim Jong Il stating that "the world outlook of the materialistic dialectics is the premise for the Juche philosophy" and that the "Juche view of history" overcomes the limitations of those developed from dialectical materialism and historical materialism. Many critics point out the lack of Marxist-Leninist theory within the writings and practice of Juche in North Korea. After the dissolution of the Soviet Union in 1991 (North Korea's greatest economic benefactor), all reference to Marxism-Leninism was dropped in the revised 1992 constitution. The establishment of the Songun doctrine in the mid-1990s then formally designated the military, not the proletariat or working class, as the main revolutionary force in North Korea.

In the speech "On Socialist Construction in the Democratic People's Republic of Korea and the South Korean Revolution" given on 14 April 1965, Kim Il Sung outlined the three fundamental principles of Juche:

1. Political independence (Korean: 자주; RR: jaju; MR: chaju)
2. Economic self-sufficiency (Korean: 자립; RR: jarip; MR: charip)
3. Military self-reliance (Korean: 자위; RR: jawi; MR: chawi)

According to Kim Jong Il's On the Juche Idea, the application of Juche in state policy entails the following:

1. The people must have independence (chajusong) in thought and politics, economic self-sufficiency, and self-reliance in defense.
2. Policy must reflect the will and aspirations of the masses and employ them fully in revolution and construction.
3. Methods of revolution and construction must be suitable to the situation of the country.
4. The most important work of revolution and construction is moulding people ideologically as communists and mobilizing them to constructive action.

=== New Left ===
The New Left was a broad political movement mainly in the 1960s and 1970s consisting of activists in the Western world who campaigned for a broad range of social issues such as civil and political rights, environmentalism, feminism, gay rights, abortion rights, gender roles, and drug policy reforms. Some see the New Left as an oppositional reaction to earlier Marxist and labor union movements for social justice that focused on dialectical materialism and social class, while others who used the term see the movement as a continuation and revitalization of traditional leftist goals.

Some who self-identified as New Left rejected involvement with the labor movement and Marxism's historical theory of class struggle, although others gravitated to their own takes on established forms of Marxism and Marxism-Leninism, such as the New Communist movement (which drew from Maoism) in the United States or the K-Gruppen (Note: The K-Gruppen originally referred to the mainly Maoist-oriented small parties and other associations that had emerged in the 1960s with the disintegration of the Socialist German Student Union (SDS) and the associated decline of the West German student movement. The term "K group" has been used primarily by competing left groups as well as in the media. It served as a collective name for the numerous, often violently divided groups and alluded to their common self-image as communist cadre organizations. The German term Kader denotes the civil servants or party functionaries in autocratic state systems, especially in socialist states (today, among others, People's Republic of China, Cuba). In the Soviet sphere of influence, cadres were a group of people in the party and ideology sector with political and technical knowledge and skills ("party cadres", "leadership cadres", "leadership cadres", "junior cadres", "cadre policy", "cadre management"). In particular, they included the functionaries of the parties and mass organizations (executives) and university and technical college graduates (experts), but not normal working people. The personnel department of a company was called "Kaderabteilung" in the GDR, the head of this department was called "Kaderleiter".) in the German-speaking world.

== 21st-century communist theorists ==
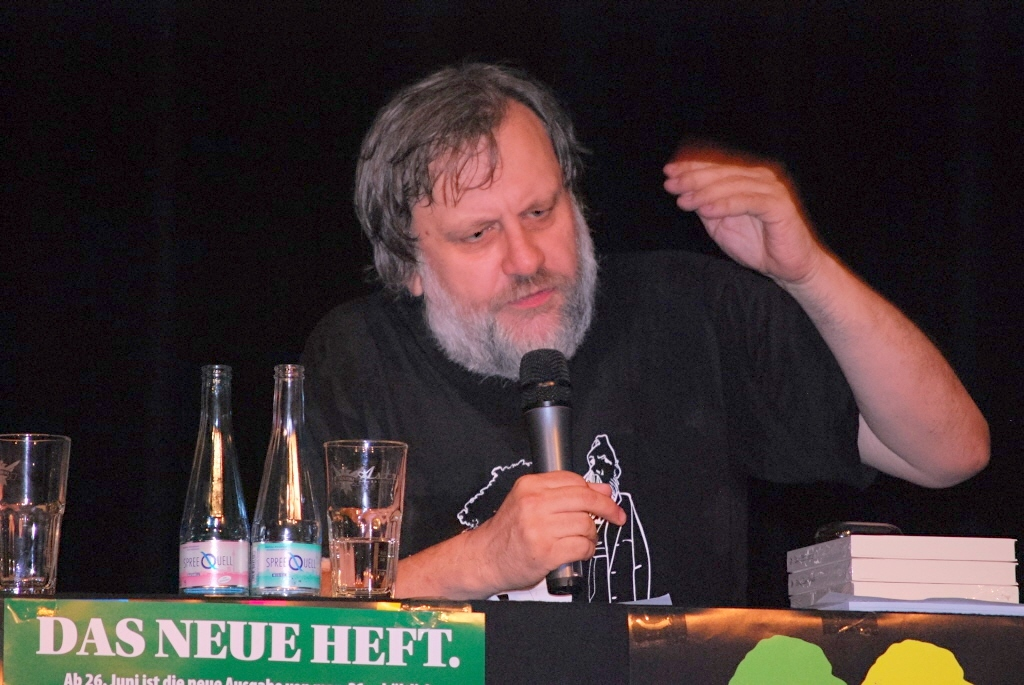
Žižek speaking in 2011

According to the political theorist Alan Johnson, there has been a revival of serious interest in communism in the 21st century led by Slavoj Žižek and Alain Badiou. Other leading theorists are Michael Hardt, Antonio Negri, Gianni Vattimo, Alessandro Russo, Judith Balso, Jodi Dean, Michael A. Lebowitz, and Paul Cockshott, as well as Alberto Toscano, translator of Alain Badiou, Terry Eagleton, Bruno Bosteels and Peter Hallward. In 2009, many of these advocates contributed to the three-day conference "The Idea of Communism" in London that drew a substantial paying audience.

Theoretical publications, some published by Verso Books, include The Idea of Communism, edited by Costas Douzinas and Žižek; Badiou's The Communist Hypothesis; and Bosteels's The Actuality of Communism. The defining common ground is the contention that "the crises of contemporary liberal capitalist societies—ecological degradation, financial turmoil, the loss of trust in the political class, exploding inequality—are systemic, interlinked, not amenable to legislative reform, and require "revolutionary" solutions".

Other non-communist thinkers and theorists have also had an effect on communist theory and the new generation of communists in the 21st century, such as the economist Guy Standing and the anthropologist and anarchist David Graeber.

== See also ==
- Anarchist schools of thought
- Marxist schools of thought
- National communism
- Types of socialism
- War communism
- World communism
