= Intensification of the class struggle under socialism =

Component of Stalinism

The intensification of the class struggle along with the development of socialism is a key component of the theory of Stalinism.

== Description ==
The theory was one of the cornerstones of Stalinism in the internal politics of the Soviet Union. Although the term class struggle was introduced by Karl Marx and Friedrich Engels and the aggravation of the class struggle was an expression originally used by Vladimir Lenin in 1919 to refer to the dictatorship of the proletariat, the theory itself was put forward by Joseph Stalin in 1929 and supplied a theoretical base for the claim that ongoing repression of capitalist elements is necessary. Stalin believed that residual bourgeois elements would persist within the country and that with support from Western powers they would try to infiltrate the party.

A variation of the theory was also adopted by Mao Zedong in China as the Continuous Revolution theory.

== Origin ==
Vladimir Lenin believed that the Russian Civil War represented the peak of class struggle that had been resolved in 1920s through the establishing the workers' state in Russia where the bourgeois class was effectively rooted out. Contrary to such position, Joseph Stalin proposed that the further the country moved forward in constructing socialism, the more acute the forms of struggle that would be used by the doomed remnants of exploiter classes in their last desperate efforts. Therefore political repression was necessary to prevent them from succeeding in their presumed goal of destroying the Soviet Union.

Stalin put forth this theory in 1929 in the special section of his speech "The Right Deviation in the C.P.S.U.(B.)" at the plenum of the Central Committee and Central Control Commission, C.P.S.U.(B.) held 16–23 April 1929, which concluded:

The dying classes are resisting, not because they have become stronger than we are, but because socialism is growing faster than they are, and they are becoming weaker than we are. And precisely because they are becoming weaker, they feel that their last days are approaching and are compelled to resist with all the forces and all the means in their power.

Such is the mechanics of the intensification of the class struggle and of the resistance of the capitalists at the present moment of history.

Stalin believed that the class enemy could even worm its way into the Bolshevik Party claiming to lead a socialist state. He evaluated his associates of the day based on whether they acted on that belief or the belief that a party could have no enemies inside it. Tolerance inside the party to those who disagreed with the official party line was called "rotten liberalism" by Stalin. He believed such tolerance would make the party weak and eventually lead to its destruction. As a result, he argued that purges were sometimes necessary.

The notion of the aggravation of class struggle under socialism was not shared by many other prominent leaders, such as Nikolai Bukharin or Leon Trotsky, who argued that there was no longer any bourgeoisie in the Soviet Union to have to struggle with and that the very definition of socialism implies there are no longer antagonistic classes.

According to historian Timothy Snyder, the "theory" served the Stalinist regime both as self-justification for the failures of its policies of collectivization (which were to be blamed on saboteurs rather than on the implementation of the programme) and as an ideological tool for the continuation of mass repression:

Stalin had developed an interesting new theory: that resistance to socialism increases as its successes mount, because its foes resist with greater desperation as they contemplate their final defeat. Thus any problem in the Soviet Union could be defined as an example of enemy action, and enemy action could be defined as evidence of progress.

== Maoism ==
Mao Zedong's theory of class struggle in socialism changed over time, having some similarities with Stalin's theory but also differences with it.

In 1956, Mao criticized Stalin's theory and agreed with Khrushchev: "After the elimination of classes, the class struggle should not continue to be stressed as though it was being intensified, as was done by Stalin with the result that the healthy development of socialist democracy was hampered. The Communist Party of the Soviet Union is completely right in firmly correcting Stalin's mistakes in this respect."

However, after China officially entered the primary stage of socialism in 1956–58, Mao's theory changed as he came into conflict with his rivals. Liu Shaoqi and Deng Xiaoping argued that since China was now socialist and the bourgeoisie was virtually nonexistent, class struggle was over. Mao instead warned against the small remaining bourgeoisie and lingering bourgeois ideas in society, and began speaking of class struggle in socialism, such as in the famous slogan "Never forget class struggle!" once plastered across China.

Mao's greatest divergence with Stalin was during his radical phase in the 1960s when he said that there is the possibility of an entire bourgeoisie developing inside the Communist Party bureaucracy in a socialist (pre-communist) society, and restoring capitalism from within. The leaders of this domestic bourgeoisie were the "people in positions of authority within the Party who take the capitalist road", i.e. Mao's rivals like Liu and Deng. Mao stressed the domestic origin of the bourgeoisie while Stalin had focused on presumed Western spies and believed restoration could only come through a foreign imperialist invasion. After the end of the radical phase of the Cultural Revolution, Mao stopped targeting the alleged bourgeoisie within the party, and changed from judging people's class based on economic or political power (past or present), to instead being based only on their "class standpoint".

== Criticism ==
Martemyan Ryutin, a staunch opponent of Stalin, eventually executed in 1937, argued in his manuscript "Stalin and the Crisis of the Proletarian Dictatorship", secretly circulated and known as the Ryutin Platform, that this theory is groundless. Ryutin concluded that this theory serves to justify the political repression of Russian peasants conducted by Stalin.

Nikita Khrushchev in his Secret Speech at the 20th Congress of the CPSU in 1956 argued that it was "a theoretical justification of the mass terror policy".

Similarly, György Lukács criticized the theory in 1968 as non-Marxist and as a vehicle to serve Stalin's tactical maneuvers:

The idea that the class struggle intensified during the period of the dictatorship of the proletariat was another case of historical falsification. [...] Prioritizing the idea of the aggravation of the class struggle served to exclude every factual theoretical discussion over the true nature of the political situation under Stalin. Russia was considered to be in a state of permanent civil war, government decisions were made on purely tactical grounds, and those who did not give their agreement were branded as open or hidden enemies of the state. It was not sufficient to logically refute such enemies, but they had to be morally defamed and socially stigmatized as "detrimental." The maintenance of the Stalinist system can easily lead to a renewal of the thesis of the aggravation of the class struggle and its attendant secret police state. If the powerful bureaucracy remains in place, and if this bureaucracy feels itself threatened, regardless of the falseness of the aggravation thesis, it can be renewed as a way of maintaining the power of the bureaucracy. The twentieth Party Congress rejected the aggravation thesis, but if the Stalinist structure of government remains intact it is possible that it can again be used.

== See also ==
- Cult of personality
- Cultural Revolution
- Maoism
- Socialism in one country
- Stalinism
