= Onorato Damen =

Italian communist politician (1893-1979)

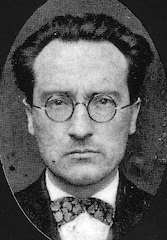
- Damen c. 1925

Personal details
- Born: 4 December 1893 Monte San Pietrangeli, Italy
- Died: 14 October 1979 (aged 85) Milan, Italy
- Party: Italian Socialist Party; Communist Party of Italy; Internationalist Communist Party

Onorato Damen (4 December 1893 – 14 October 1979) was an Italian politician, communist revolutionary and internationalist.

He is remembered as one of the most notable representatives of left communism and proletarian internationalism in Europe. He began his political career in the Italian Socialist Party, and later joined the Communist Party of Italy following the split that led to its formation. After being expelled in 1929, he worked with the organized Italian left, becoming one of the leaders and founders of the Internationalist Communist Party (PCInt), formally founded in 1943.

The PCInt went on to become the numerically largest left communist organization in the post-World War II period, until in 1952 Amadeo Bordiga, who had come out of retirement, split the party to form the International Communist Party (ICP). A majority followed Damen, whose group maintained the original name, the original theoretical journal Prometeo, and the paper Battaglia Comunista. Damen remained politically active for the duration of his entire adult life, authoring works such as Bordiga Beyond the Myth and Gramsci: Between Marxism and Idealism.

== Biography ==
Onorato Damen was born on 4 December 1893 in Monte San Pietrangeli, in the Italian province of Fermo. In his youth, he joined the Italian Socialist Party (PSI), wherein he staunchly opposed the revisionist politics of such figures as Filippo Turati, Claudio Treves and Giuseppe Emanuele Modigliani. Just over twenty years old at the beginning of the First World War, he was conscripted to the Italian Army and sent to the front as a Sergeant. By the time hostilities ended, he had been demoted to the rank of Private, and was then subsequently condemned by a military tribunal to two years in a military prison for "endangering public institutions", due to his support of revolutionary defeatism, which he expressed by inciting desertion and denouncing the imperialistic character of the war. Released in 1919, he returned to his position in the PSI, collaborating on the socialist periodical of Fermo, La Lotta (The Struggle).

During the Biennio Rosso (1920–21), a period of heightened social and political tensions in Italy, Damen worked first in Bologna with the local Trade Union Council and then with the Casa del Popolo ("People's House") of Granarolo dell'Emilia as the secretary of the Community Legal Committee.

During this period, Damen embraced the intransigent politics of Amadeo Bordiga, and thus joined the Communist Party of Italy (PCd'I) upon its formation. In the months immediately preceding the party's split from the PSI at Livorno, he worked as secretary of the Trade Union Council in Pistoia and as the chief editor of the periodical L'avvenire. He would remain in Pistoia until his arrest during a 1921 electoral campaign as a result of an event which took place in Poggio a Caiano.

In February 1921, Damen was denounced by the judiciary for using violent language during a rally in Piazza Garibaldi, Pistoia. Due to his political activities, he quickly became one of the main targets of the nascent fascist movement in Tuscany, the region where he had been organising for months. On 10 May of the same year, while returning from an election rally held on behalf of a candidate of the Communist Party of Italy in the village of Corbezzi, he was detained by a group of fascists who took him to their offices in the nearby city of Pistoia. Here, they tried to beat him into renouncing his "Bolshevik" ideas. Failing to do so, they then transferred him to the local fascist administrative centre at Piazza Ottaviani in Florence. There, he came before Amerigo Dumini (who would later organize the abduction and murder of Giacomo Matteotti), who advised him to "disappear for the entire period of the electoral campaign, hide [himself] in a villa in Fiesole or remain in Florence under [Dumini's] continual surveillance". Damen refused to go into hiding, and was thus kept under Dumini's surveillance.

A violent general strike quickly erupted in Pistoia as a result of Damen's detainment, and Dumini was left with no choice but to release him. Renewing contacts with the PCd'I and ignoring the fears of his comrades, he decided to return to Pistoia, in order to continue his political campaigning. On the return trip, in a car escorted by a group of armed comrades, he was ambushed by a squadron of fascists near Poggio a Caiano. The resulting firefight resulted in the death of one of the fascists and the wounding of two others. Though Damen was found not guilty of complicity to murder, he was nevertheless sentenced to three years imprisonment in the Murate complex in Florence due to his involvement in the shooting.

Given the incident at Poggio a Caiano and Damen's subsequent incarceration, the leadership of the PCd'I decided to send him to France as a part of their "Political Bureau" to represent the party and to preside over the organisation of groups of exiled members, coordinating their political activity as the director of the Italian edition of the weekly newspaper L'Humanité. Later, upon his clandestine re-entry in Italy in 1924, the PCd'I presented him as a candidate in the elections, and in spite of strong fascist opposition, Damen was elected as a deputy on the city council of Florence.

Meanwhile, within the PCd'I, the rupture between the direction imposed by Moscow and the left wing of the party was growing. Inspired by the Aventine secession that had taken place as a result of the Matteotti affair, Bordiga, who had widespread support within the party, initiated his own "secession", attending the meetings of the Central Committee of the party but not intervening in any debates.

Damen, as a left communist, strongly disagreed with the new party direction, and though critical of Bordiga for his easy acceptance of Bolshevisation, he nonetheless rallied alongside him in his fight against what he perceived to be "political degradation". It is at this point that he fell foul of the PCd'I leadership, with the Florence Federation calling for a re-evaluation of his position within the party. A meeting was called regarding the matter, to which Damen himself was not invited, but it was quickly broken up by Italian law enforcement, whom had received word that the participants were armed and dangerous.

In 1925, the divide between the left wing and the centre of the PCd'I became even greater, due to the Gramsci and Togliatti-led leadership's support for a "workers' government" in place of the dictatorship of the proletariat and the formation of a "united front" with the social democrats of the PSI. Damen, together with Luigi Repossi, Bruno Fortichiari and his future wife Francesca Grossi, formed the Committee of Intesa, with the aim of defending the work of the Left within the party and maintaining its original views. The Platform of the Committee was hailed by Leon Trotsky as a seminal work of the International Left Opposition, referring to it in his writings as the "Platform of the Left". However, under threat of expulsion from the Communist International and criticism of the Committee as "factionalist", it would dissolve by order of the party leadership. This directive was accepted by Amadeo Bordiga under the guise of "party discipline", much to the dismay of the party's Left majority, who regarded him as a leading figure in the struggle against the Comintern-imposed party leadership.

During the session of the Chamber of Deputies held on 9 March 1925, Damen addressed the Fascist-majority parliament concerning the Communists' opposition to the Fascist vote to commemorate the death of Friedrich Ebert, President of the Weimar Republic from 1919 until his death in 1925. Two days later, Damen would present a scathing criticism of Fascism to the chamber, defining the Fascist movement as the "guard dog of property" and making a forensic and statistical refutation of the idea that the Fascist program benefited the working class by demonstrating that the cost of living had risen and real wages had declined ever since Fascists had taken power in Italy.

In November 1926, Damen was briefly confined on the island of Ustica, where he would be joined soon after by Gramsci and Bordiga. He would then be released, only to be arrested again in December of the same year and sent to the Murate complex in Florence after being implicated at the trial of a group of Florentine communists accused of plotting against the state. He was condemned by a special tribunal to twelve years of imprisonment; he would serve only seven, in the prisons of Saluzzo, Pallanza, Civitavecchia (where he led a prison revolt) and Pianosa, before being released under amnesty at the end of 1933 and sent to Milan, where he remained under surveillance for 5 years. After his release, the head of the prison in Pianosa communicated to the Casellario politico centrale that the punishment he had suffered during his imprisonment had had "no moral effect" on him, describing him as an "unshakeable communist".

Damen was arrested again at the end of 1935, and once more in 1937 for spreading Communist propaganda regarding the Spanish Civil War. Police sources testified he did not participate in the propaganda around the clandestine reorganisation of the Italian Communist Party (PCI), because, remaining faithful to his left communist political orientation, he disseminated propaganda of the international left in opposition to the policies of the Comintern and Stalinism. Arrested again at the outbreak of the Second World War, he was confined for most of the conflict, before being released in 1943 by the Badoglio government.

In 1943, taking advantage of a wave of mass strikes in Northern Italy, the Internationalist Communist Party (ICP) was formed, intending to serve as a replacement to the now fully Marxist–Leninist Comintern. Though Damen was in prison, he nonetheless played an important role in its formation, having kept in touch with other leftists during the 30s and 40s, and contributing to the first issues of the theoretical journal Prometeo.

In 1945, Togliatti and the PCI, in response to the formation of this new communist international, unsuccessfully petitioned the CLN to have the leaders of the ICP, including Damen, condemned to death as saboteurs, falsely labeling them agents of the Gestapo. Togliatti's Italian Communist Party had already organized the assassinations of two of its founding members and organizers, those being Fausto Atti and Mario Acquaviva.

In the early 1950s, Bordiga began calling for a return to the positions of the Italian Communist Left as they were in the early 1920s, when he was the leader of the PCd'I. To this end, he split from the ICP, founding his own International Communist Party, which then launched its own paper, Il Programma Comunista. A majority, however, stayed with Damen and the ICP, which kept the paper Battaglia Comunista and the theoretical journal Prometeo. Damen defended the following positions, which Bordiga disagreed with:

- In an era of global imperialism, the working class can no longer gain anything from supporting national liberation struggles and bourgeois revolutions.
- It is no longer possible to gain influence amongst the working class by gaining influence amongst trade unions, which have become too integrated into the capitalist state.
- The Party is not the working class in and of itself, but only a part of it, which should act in unison with its interests, struggles and historical objectives.
- The USSR is not a "neither-nor" society (neither fully capitalist nor fully communist), but in fact state capitalist.
- Marxism is not an "invariant" doctrine, and in certain aspects has evolved from the original 1848 views of Marx and Engels.

Throughout the 50s and 60s, the ICP, along with most other socialist and communist movements in Europe, began to decline due to the post-war economic boom. With the 1970s recession, however, it saw a resurgence, and in 1977 it organized the first of the International Conferences of the Communist Left. As a result of these conferences, which ended in 1980, the ICP and the Communist Workers' Organisation together formed the International Bureau for the Revolutionary Party (IBRP) around the basis of a common platform. The IBRP would go on to become the Internationalist Communist Tendency (ICT) in 2009, which is still active to this day.

Onorato Damen died on 14 October 1979, at the age of 85.

== Works ==
- The Russia we Love and Defend (1943)
- Bourgeois Violence and Proletarian Defence (1946)
- Centralised Party, Yes – Centralism over the Party, No! (1951)
- Five Letters and an Outline of the Disagreement (1952)
- Points of Disagreement with the 1952 “Platform” Drafted by Bordiga (1952)
- Crisis of Bordigism? Maybe, But Not a Crisis of the Italian Left (1953)
- Bologna 1919: A Page From History (1966)
- We Defend the Italian Left (1966)
- Amadeo Bordiga – Beyond the Myth and the Rhetoric (1970)
- The Irrational in the World of the Superstructure (1972)
- You Can’t Build the Party Playing with Paradoxes (1972)
- Axioms of Revolutionary Theory and Practice (1974)
- The “Absolutes” of Neo-Idealism (1975)
