= Roger Dangeville =

French translator

Roger Dangeville (1 June 1925, Moselle – 9 September 2006, Mérindol-les-Oliviers) was a left communist activist most noted for his translation of Karl Marx's Grundrisse and his work with Jacques Camatte.

Dangeville was of Alsatian origin, growing up bilingual. He had working class parents, Pierre Dangeville and Catherine Siegler He studied philosophy in Paris. In 1956, he was recruited to the International Communist Party (ICP) in 1956 by Suzanne Voûte. He soon started work on his translation of the Grundrisse, with some partial translations being circulated within the ICP by 1959. For ten years he worked closely with Amadeo Bordiga, but broke with ICP in 1966. His following collaboration with Jacques Camatte, who left the ICP at the same time, was short lived. While Camatte went on to found Invariance, Dangeville founded Le fil du temps which ran from December 1967 to 1976 when the thirteenth and final issue appeared.
