= International Communist Party =

International political organization

International Communist Party Partito Comunista Internazionale
- Founded: 1952; 74 years ago
- Preceded by: Internationalist Communist Party
- Succeeded by: Multiple groups claiming the name
- Headquarters: Italy
- Newspaper: Il Programma Comunista; Le Prolétaire; El Comunista; Il Partito Comunista; Il Partito Comunista Internazionale
- Ideology: Communism; Left communism Leninism; Marxism; Proletarian internationalism Anti-parliamentarianism; Anti-nationalism; Anti-Stalinism; Anti-democracy; Anti-Trotskyism
- Colors: Red

Website
- internationalcommunistparty.org pcint.org pcielcomunista.org intcp.org international-communist-party.org

The International Communist Party (ICP) is the name assumed by a number of left communist international political parties today. The ICP has often been described as Bordigist due to the contributions made by longtime member Amadeo Bordiga, although the adherents of the party do not explicitly identify as Bordigists.

Each party has its own website, newspaper publication and variation of the following statement to distinguish itself from other parties:

"The line running from Marx to Lenin to the foundation of the Third International and the birth of the Communist Party of Italy in Leghorn (Livorno) 1921, and from there to the struggle of the Italian Communist Left against the degeneration in Moscow and to the rejection of popular fronts and coalition of resistance groups – The tough work of restoring the revolutionary doctrine and the party organ, in contact with the working class, outside the realm of personal politics and electoralist manoevrings."

== Origins ==
=== Early development within the Italian Socialist Party ===
The roots of the International Communist Party can be traced to the left wing of the Italian Socialist Party (PSI), founded in 1892. The first two decades of the PSI were marked by an internal struggle led by the left faction to establish Marxism as the party's official ideology. Initially a minority, the left gained prominence at the 1910 congress, where they organized themselves as the Intransigent Revolutionary faction. By 1912, this faction had become dominant within the PSI, with key figures including Benito Mussolini, Angelica Balabanoff, and Amadeo Bordiga.

=== World War I and political divergences ===
The outbreak of World War I led to significant ideological divisions within the PSI. Mussolini broke with the left by adopting a pro-Allied stance, while Bordiga developed an anti-war position similar to Lenin's revolutionary defeatism. This position, though rejected by most socialist leaders, established Bordiga as a prominent voice within the party base. After Mussolini's expulsion for his increasingly militarist position, leadership passed to Giacinto Menotti Serrati's centrist faction, which maintained an ambiguous position between the right wing led by Filippo Turati and the left.

Like Lenin, faced with the Second International's support of various sides in the war, Bordiga called for the formation of a new international. When the left encountered Lenin's views after the October Revolution, they considered them not a new adaptation of Marxism but a restatement of it.

=== Formation of the Communist Party of Italy ===
Under the influence of the Russian Revolution, the 1918 congress of the PSI officially adopted the policy of the dictatorship of the proletariat. In 1919, the left organized as the Abstentionist Communist Faction, seeking to exclude reformists and align with the Communist International (Comintern). The implicit support given by the Comintern at the 2nd World Congress enabled the Abstentionist Communist Faction to break out of its isolation as a minority in the party. Simultaneously, the Ordine Nuovo group emerged in Turin under Antonio Gramsci and Palmiro Togliatti. Initially close to Serrati's maximalists and in favor of participating in elections, they first entered into polemics with the Abstentionist Communist Faction, only to move closer to it in 1920 as it gained majority support in cities such as Naples, Milan, Florence, and Turin.

In January 1921, these revolutionary elements split from the PSI to form the Communist Party of Italy (PCd'I) under Bordiga's leadership, taking with them approximately one-third of the PSI's membership and most of its youth wing. The new party maintained a critical stance toward several Comintern policies, including the strategic position of anti-fascism, the tactical position of the united front, the policy of "Bolshevization" and the formation of workers' governments.

Despite representing the majority faction, the PCd'I's left leadership was replaced in 1924 by Gramsci under pressure from the Comintern, then effectively controlled by Joseph Stalin. This didn't prevent Bordiga from challenging Stalin directly at the 6th Enlarged Executive of the Communist International in 1926, arguing that Russian affairs had to be decided by the International.

=== Left Opposition and the formation of the Left Faction ===
The Left Faction of the Communist Party of Italy formed in 1928, primarily composed of Italian émigré communities in Belgium, France, and the United States. The formation was prompted by Leon Trotsky's expulsion from the Soviet Union, the adoption of the theory of socialism in one country, as well as a growing number of other disagreements with Comintern policies.

Though initially sympathetic to Trotsky's Left Opposition, the faction maintained its independence. Trotsky eventually turned towards the New Italian Opposition, formed by former Stalinists, as his Italian contacts due to the faction's hesitation about hastily forming heterogeneous opposition groups into an organized whole.

=== Wartime activity and the formation of the Internationalist Communist Party ===
The Left Faction opposed the Spanish Civil War, viewing it as a prelude to the coming imperialist war. In 1938, the International Bureau of Left Factions was founded as the only organ from which the future party would emerge. During World War II, the scattered militants maintained a revolutionary defeatist position.

In 1943, a nucleus led by militants including Onorato Damen, Fausto Atti, Mario Acquaviva, and Bruno Maffi established the Internationalist Communist Party (Partito Comunista Internazionalista) in Northern Italy. The party conducted significant anti-war agitation among factory workers and partisans. Eventually, Atti and Acquaviva were killed by Italian Communist Party members in 1945 for their intervention among partisan groups. Following the Allied invasion of Italy, the Left Faction of Communists and Socialists around Bordiga formed in Naples and was absorbed into the new party in 1945, although Bordiga himself did not formally join until 1949.

Immediately, serious divergences emerged between two main currents of the Internationalist Communist Party, eventually leading to a split in 1952. The faction centered around Damen favored electoral participation and rejected both union work and national liberation struggles, whereas the faction centered around Bordiga opposed the policy of revolutionary parliamentarianism, supported union work, and maintained the Communist International's position on national and colonial questions. Following the 1952 split, Damen's group continued to publish the magazine Battaglia Comunista, while Bordiga's faction published Il Programma Comunista.

== History ==
=== Formation of the International Communist Party ===
The faction around Bordiga, now organized as a new party, did not officially adopt the name International Communist Party until 1965. Afterwards, its internal organization underwent significant changes. The policy of democratic centralism was replaced with organic centralism, which eliminated internal mechanisms of democracy. Party congresses were substituted with general meetings featuring detailed presentations, and a single commissioner (Bruno Maffi) was appointed with the task of linking different sections of the party.

==== 1960s ====
In 1964, the Milan section split off to form Rivoluzione Comunista, which was opposed to the concept of organic centralism. In 1966, the Paris section under Jacques Camatte and Roger Dangeville split off as well. Camatte's group formed around the magazine Invariance, and Dangeville's followers gathered around Le Fil du Temps.

The party experienced significant growth in France following May 1968, despite taking a critical stance toward the student protests. However, it recognized the workers' strikes as superior to those during the 1937 May Days in Spain.

Opposition to the union strategy of reconquering the CGT and CGIL mounted in the aftermath of May 1968 in response to autonomous student-worker assemblies and disciplinary measures from trade union officials.

==== 1970s onward ====
Between December 1971 and January 1972, several sections of the International Communist Party in France seceded, opposing working within, rather than against, trade unions.

In 1973, the Scandinavian sections, which had come into conflict with the International Communist Party center for their drift towards the positions of the KAPD, split over opposition to the union policy of the International Communist Party and briefly published the newspaper Kommunismen.

The party proceeded towards a policy of neither conquering nor destroying the unions after differing views emerged in response to the perceived failures of May 1968 and the Hot Autumn, causing tension with those most active in the unions.

In 1974, the Florentine section grouped around Giuliano Bianchini, who had led the ICP's Central Trade Union Bureau since the 1960s, were expelled by the ICP over positions on trade union strategy. Those highly active within the CGIL promoted the slogan of the "reconquest of the class union" and the "Red Union", aiming to conquer it and return to the traditional methods of class struggle. Due to the failure of these initiatives, the party leadership began to view this work as activist.

Bianchini's group later adopted the slogan of "outside and against" regime unions where agitation is deemed impossible. Il Programma Comunista and its descendents would adopt the slogan "inside and outside" as well as "against" the regime unions.

The Florence section also claimed to differ in regards to organic centralism, opposing the manner in which they were expelled from the party and the initial tactical shifts in regards to electoralism and trade union strategy. They would form their own International Communist Party around the newspaper Il Partito Comunista and the theoretical review Comunismo.

Over the course of the 1970s, Il Programma Comunista and its sections would adopt more interventionist positions that proved controversial and contributed to major splits in the 1980s, especially in regards to activism.

In 1972, the adoption of trade union theses allowed for continued work within regime unions like the CGIL as well as the possibility for a militant class resurgence without the conquest or rebirth of trade unions.

In 1974, calls to vote against repeal of divorce law and against xenophobic Swiss referendums were put forth with no position firmly taken by all sections or the center as well as upheaval within the party over this position. This marked the beginning of an "acknowledgment of the need for concrete political action."

In 1975, following government crackdowns on dissident political organizations, Il Programma Comunista and its sections fostered distinct hierarchies, specialized roles and frequent disciplinary procedures.

In 1976, the French section of the party, organized under the newspaper Le Prolétaire, engaged in joint calls with other political organizations regarding the struggle of hostel immigrant workers, and Il Programma endorsed work within what it termed "inter-class organizations" to propagate positions and defend immediate interests shared by proletarians and non-proletarians through methods defined as proletarian class struggle.

In 1978, support for immigrants' right to vote were put forth by certain sections.

In 1979, the formation of and participation within the “Comitato Nazionale contro i Licenzamienti” by Il Programma Comunista to defend 61 FIAT workers who were fired while the Federation of Metalworkers (Federazione Lavoratori Metalmeccanici, FLM)—which Il Programma designated a "regime union"—demanded they renounce "violent methods" to be reinstated.

In 1981, joint action with other political organizations were again endorsed by Le Prolétaire, and Il Programma Comunista supported working within groups that lead social movements, seeking to absorb young people, immigrants, the homeless, victims of repression, political prisoners and the unemployed in general.

In 1982, Il Programma Comunista and its sections underwent a severe crisis centered around a political shift that led Le Prolétaire to support groups such as the Popular Movement for the Liberation of Angola (MPLA), the Palestinian fedayeen, and the Khmer Rouge.

The crisis fully broke out when the Algerian-focused newspaper of the Paris section of the party, El Oumami, published an article in July 1982 calling for solidarity with the Palestine Liberation Organization, which was engaged in the 1982 Lebanon War, which was supported by the leadership of the Paris section.

The Ivrea and Turin sections split from the party in 1981, soon forming the periodical Lettere ai compagni which would eventually form the journal n+1. In 1982, the Schio section formed a new party around their publication Bollettino and would publish until 2005. The Spanish section broke away after formally deciding to break party discipline in 1982 due to the party's participation in inter-class organizations and the expulsion of longtime militant Suzanne Voute, forming the magazine El Comunista in 1983. They would come to reject the 1972 trade union theses.

Bruno Maffi, leader of the International Communist Party, was ousted from the International Central Bureau and Il Programma Comunista in 1983 which were taken over by a group named Combat where the practice of democratic centralism was restored and a central committee elected. After a court ruled in favor of Maffi's ownership of Il Programma Comunista in 1984, Combat was forced to give up the paper and briefly published Giornale per il partito comunista internazionale. Maffi would restore the practice of organic centralism and disavow issues between July 1983 and June 1984.

A new paper, Il Comunista, would appear during this internal struggle around 1983-84, and would link up with the remaining members of Le Prolétaire to form a new party in 1985. This current consisted of members who were participants in the hostel struggles, but critical of nationalist developments in the party. They would come to insist on waging political struggle within the party and create a balance sheet of the crisis. This split came to oppose Maffi and even Combat despite being in charge of publishing Il Programma Comunista from 1983 to 1984. Combat was criticized by them as too Leninist, but this current desired to not neglect practical activity.

In 2005, former members of Bollettino who split in 1987 to rejoin Il Programma Comunista re-split to form another party around the publication Sul filo rosso del tempo.

In 2024, a split occurred within Il Partito Comunista over "factionalism from above" and "questions of organic centralism and union address," that led to the creation of the IntCP. The IntCP maintains legal ownership of Il Partito Comunista, and the ICP now publishes Il Partito Comunista Internazionale, however the two parties are currently in a legal conflict over the theoretical review Comunismo which both continue to publish.

=== Contemporary organizations ===
Several organizations now claim the ICP name, distinguished by their publications and activity:

| Publications | Languages | Links |
|---|---|---|
| Il Programma Comunista: Kommunistisches Programm; The Internationalist; Cahiers internationalistes | Italian, German, English, French | Website |
| Le Prolétaire: Il Comunista; El Proletario; El Programa Comunista; Proletarian | French, Italian, Spanish, English | Website |
| El Comunista: Per Il Comunismo; The Internationalist Proletarian | Spanish, Catalan, Italian, English | Website |
| Il Partito Comunista: The International Communist | Italian, English | Website |
| Il Partito Comunista Internazionale: The International Communist Party; el Partido Comunista Internacional; Enternasyonal Komünist Partisi | Italian, English, Spanish, Turkish | Website |

== Theoretical positions ==
=== The invariance of Marxism ===
The ICP does not view Marxism as a doctrine discovered or introduced by Marx, but rather as a theory that emerged alongside the modern industrial proletariat. According to the party:

- Marxism cannot be molded or remolded by adding or changing aspects
- The doctrine must remain common, uniform, monolithic, and steadfast
- Any attempts to "update," "revise," or "distort" Marxism must be opposed
- The doctrine accompanies the proletariat throughout social revolution

=== Party organization ===
==== Organic centralism ====
The ICP replaces democratic centralism with organic centralism, characterized by:

- Rejection of voting mechanisms within the party
- Development of specialized organizational organs
- Unity of theoretical and practical work
- No formal separation between study and action

According to the party, organic centralism means developing organs suited to various functions (propaganda, proselytism, union work, etc.) while ensuring all members remain involved in multiple aspects of party work. This prevents the division between theoretical study and practical action.

==== Role of the party ====
The ICP considers the class party indispensable for proletarian revolutionary struggle. Its key functions include:

- Uniting working-class efforts and transforming group struggles into general revolutionary movement
- Propagating revolutionary theory among the masses
- Organizing material means of action
- Leading the working class throughout its struggle
- Securing historical continuity and international unity
- Representing, organizing, and directing the proletarian dictatorship

=== Political and economic positions ===
==== Immediate program ====
The ICP foregoes reformist minimum programs and Trotskyist transitional demands in favor of measures to be enacted upon seizing power:

- Disinvestment of capital with a smaller proportion of total production dedicated to instrumental and non-consumable goods
- Higher wages for less working time
- Reduction of the working day to at least half
- Reduction of the volume of production
- Authoritarian control of consumption to combat the promotion of dangerous and unnecessary goods
- Abolition of activities dedicated to propagating a reactionary psychology
- Breaking down the barriers between individual enterprises in order to move towards the plan of consumption
- Abolition of mercantile welfare in favor of minimum social provision for non-workers
- Construction freeze of houses and workplaces around cities
- Reduction of the congestion, volume, and velocity of traffic and its prohibition when unnecessary
- Abolition of careers and qualifications to struggle against the social division of labor
- Measures to bring schools, the press, all means of transmitting information, and cultural institutions under control of the proletarian State

==== Democracy and parliamentarianism ====
The ICP maintains a stringent anti-parliamentary position:

- Rejects parliamentary assemblies in favor of working bodies
- Advocates single-party proletarian state
- Opposes "democracy" in all forms, including: "Bourgeois democracy", "Democracy in general", "Class democracy", "Workers' democracy"

The party advocates:

- Immediate recall of state officials
- Worker-level wages for officials
- Systematic rotation to eliminate bureaucracy
- Ending civil service as a career or profession

==== Trade union work ====
The ICP maintains the position of the Communist Party of Italy regarding unions:

- Aims for party control over leading bodies of economic organisms, especially national union executives
- Avoids splits in unions when leadership remains with other parties
- Members follow union directives in action while maintaining right to criticize
- Views unions as mechanisms for leading proletarian movements outside party ranks

==== National and colonial questions ====
The ICP's analysis of anti-colonial revolutions distinguishes between:

Major post-colonial states:

- Continue struggling against imperialist influence
- Develop their own forms of imperialism
- Prioritize heavy industry within a monopolistic framework
- Nurture finance capital

Minor post-colonial states:

- Remain fundamentally colonial despite political independence
- Similar to Central and South American republics
- Unable to achieve true economic independence

== See also ==
- Amadeo Bordiga
- Internationalist Communist Party (Italy)
- Invariance
- Left communism
