= Jacques Camatte =

French writer and theorist (1935–2025)

- Born: Jacques Maurice Camatte; 18 February 1935; Plan-de-Cuques, France
- Died: 19 April 2025 (aged 90); Cajarc, France

Philosophical work
- Era: Contemporary philosophy
- Region: Western philosophy
- School: Ultra-left; Bordigism (formerly); Primitivism; Post-Marxism
- Main interests: Communism; Community; Technology; Domination
- Notable ideas: Domestication; Gemeinwesen; Wandering of humanity

Jacques Maurice Camatte (French: [ʒak kamat]; 18 February 1935 – 19 April 2025) was a French writer and theorist. He began his intellectual career as a leading figure in the ultra-left Bordigist movement, a doctrinaire current of Marxism. After breaking with Bordigism following the events of May 1968, he developed a radical critique of Marxism itself, capitalism, and industrial civilisation. His work became highly influential on anarcho-primitivism.

Camatte's thought is best known for its periodisation of capitalism. Drawing on Karl Marx's concept of the subsumption of labour under capital, Camatte argued that capitalism had moved from a "formal" to a "real domination" over society. In this later stage, which he termed the "domestication" of humanity, he contended that capital had become a self-perpetuating "material community" that remade all social relations in its image, effectively absorbing the proletariat and neutralizing class conflict. Consequently, he rejected the traditional Marxist focus on proletarian revolution.

Camatte's later work proposed a pessimistic theory of the "wandering of humanity," in which the human species' separation from nature, beginning long before capitalism, had culminated in a totalising industrial society. He abandoned Marxism as an ideology of productivism and called for humanity to "leave this world" by abandoning technology and urban life to rediscover its lost communal essence, or Gemeinwesen, in harmony with nature. In his final decades, he lived a life of rustic simplicity, putting his philosophy into practice.

== Early life and political development ==
Jacques Maurice Camatte was born in Plan-de-Cuques, near Marseille, France, on 18 February 1935. His childhood was marked by poverty and trauma; his mother was institutionalised for mental illness, and he spent five years in a home for abandoned children. He later recalled this period as instilling in him a sense of the "repression of naturalness" and a profound questioning of adult "wickedness," experiences that he saw as formative for his later political and theoretical trajectory, particularly his concepts of threat and madness. In 1953, while in high school, he met Otello Ricceri, an Italian worker and communist who had fled fascism and who introduced him to the thought of the Italian Marxist theorist Amadeo Bordiga, a principal figure of the communist left. Camatte was drawn to Bordiga's intransigent opposition to both Western capitalism and the Soviet Union, and his revolutionary stance against colonialism and all forms of nationalism.

=== Bordigist period ===
Camatte began a correspondence with Bordiga in 1954, meeting him the following year. He became a member of the International Communist Party, which was founded by Bordiga, and later recalled being drawn to its theoretical power and its communal atmosphere, in which intellectuals and agricultural workers mixed. He began attending party meetings throughout Italy from the age of eighteen, and described his first personal meeting with Bordiga at age twenty as a "luminous" experience, remembering him as a powerful and affectionate figure who embraced comrades upon their arrival. He became fluent in Italian and maintained intellectual relationships with Italian thinkers including Giorgio Cesarano, Gianni Collu, and Piero Coppo.

During the 1960s, Camatte's work was firmly situated within the Bordigist current of the ultra-left. He worked as a teacher of earth and life sciences in Toulon and Rodez. In early texts such as "Origin and Function of the Party Form" (1961), co-written with Roger Dangeville, Camatte articulated an orthodox Bordigist position. He argued that a disciplined, unitary communist party equipped with an invariant programme was necessary to prepare for proletarian revolution. This party would act as an "organ of foresight" and a "prefiguration of communist society". After seizing power, the party would establish itself as a "social brain" to guide the transition to communism, rejecting democracy in favour of what Bordiga termed "organic centralism". This anti-democratic stance was further developed in "The Democratic Mystification" (published 1969), in which Camatte defined democracy as a mechanism for class rule that organises individuals who have lost their "original organic unity with the community".

A consistent theme throughout Camatte's work, originating in this early period, is his emphasis on the Marxian concept of Gemeinwesen (a German term meaning "common essence" or "communal being"). For Camatte, Gemeinwesen represents the true social nature of humanity, which has been lost under class society but which can be glimpsed in the proletariat's potential to overcome the bourgeois dichotomy between the individual and society.

=== Break with Marxism ===
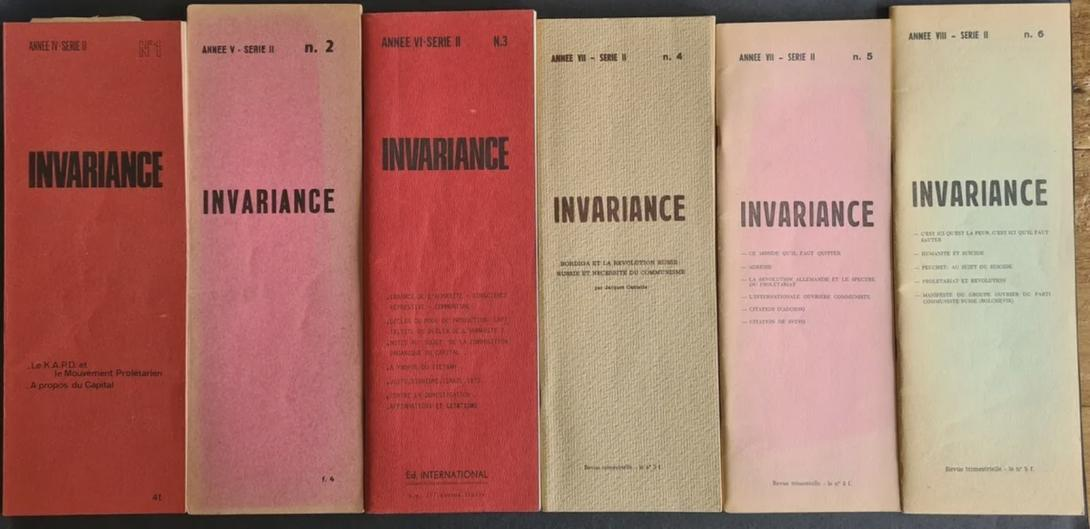
Copies of Series II of Invariance

Camatte broke from the International Communist Party in 1966. According to his later account, the split was precipitated by both organisational and political disagreements. He resisted a turn away from Bordiga's principle of "organic centralism" toward what he saw as a more rigid, activist style of organisation. He also disagreed with the party's increasingly uncritical support for anti-colonial movements, which he felt ignored the bourgeois nature of their leadership. The final break occurred after a contentious meeting in Paris, where Camatte rose and declared the meeting a "masquerade". He founded the journal Invariance in 1968, naming it after Bordiga's concept of the "invariance of Marxism" to signal his continued fidelity to Bordiga's theoretical project, in contrast to his former comrades who had started a journal named after another Bordigist concept, Le Fil du temps (The Thread of Time).

==== Real domination of capital ====
Camatte's major work from this transitional period, Capital and Community (1968), was a lengthy exegesis of Karl Marx's writings, particularly the "Results of the Immediate Process of Production", the then-non-canonical "unpublished sixth chapter" of Das Kapital. In this text, Marx distinguishes between the "formal subsumption" and "real subsumption" of labour under capital. Formal subsumption occurs when capital incorporates existing labour processes, while real subsumption involves capital reshaping the labour process itself to increase relative surplus value. Camatte interpreted this distinction as the key to understanding the entirety of Marx's work. He chose to translate Marx's term Subsumtion as "domination" rather than the more literal "subsumption" to emphasize that capital had become the active agent in the relationship, not the worker.

Camatte argued that in the phase of real domination, capital becomes a self-perpetuating, autonomous power that remakes all of society in its image. According to his analysis, the "autonomization of exchange value" in the form of money gives rise to a single, abstract social relation that constitutes capital as a "material community". This process was cemented by the historic "defeat of the proletariat" in the 1920s, after which capital could complete its domination. For Camatte, this process went beyond the factory to encompass the integration of all social relations into capital's logic. Capital becomes the "material community," an "animated monster" that seizes "all the materiality of man" and reduces human beings to "pure spirits who now receive their substance from capital." Camatte argued that under these conditions, "Men who have become pure spirits can rediscover themselves in the capital form without content." This process, which he termed the "domestication" of humanity, became the central object of his critique.

==== Post-1968 turn to primitivism ====
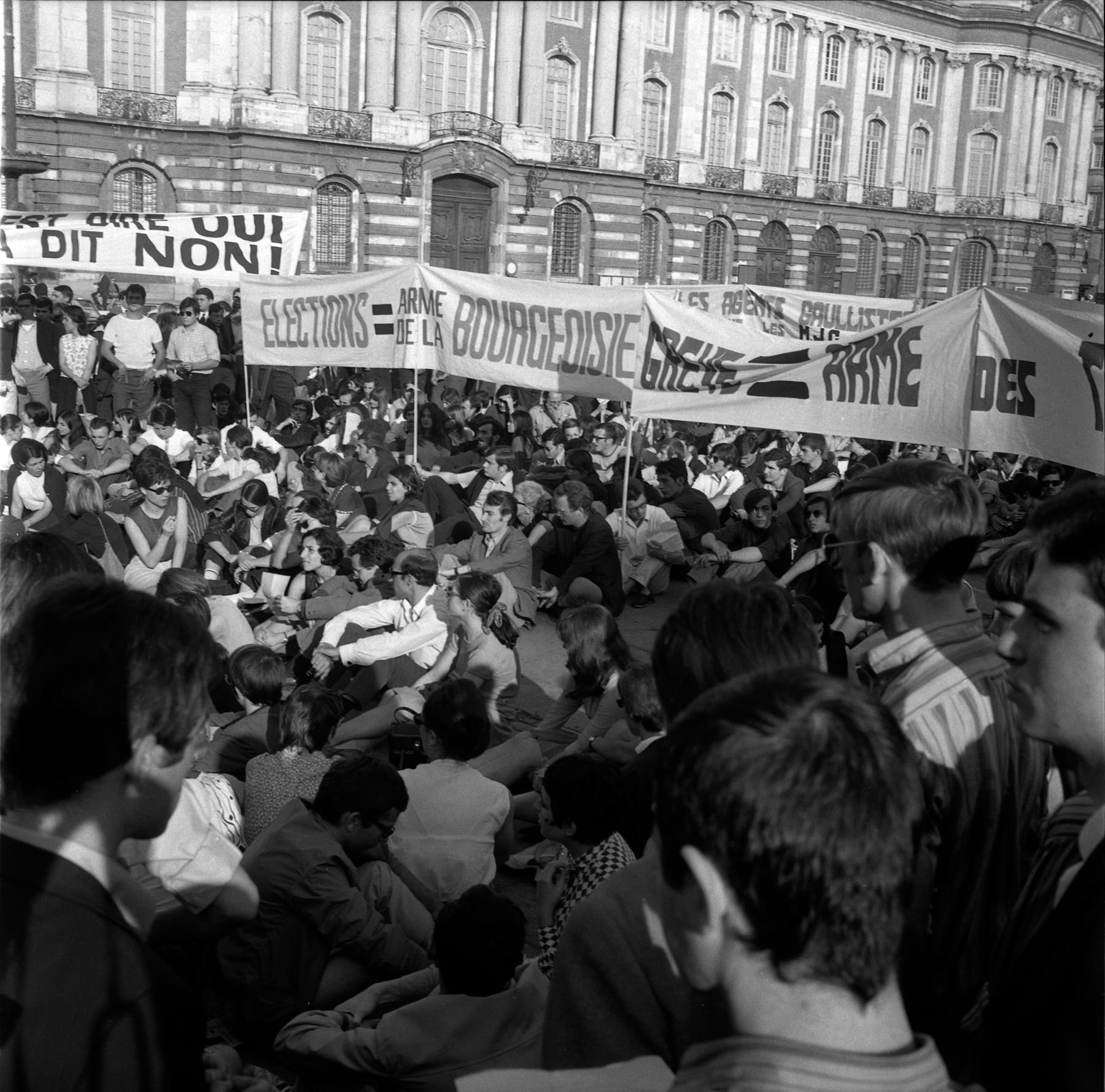
Protest in Toulouse during the May 1968 events in France

The social and political upheavals surrounding the events of May 1968 marked a fundamental turning point for Camatte. Influenced by the rise of councilist and anarchist currents that rejected traditional party structures, he decisively broke with the Leninist party form. In his 1969 letter "On Organization," Camatte argued that all political parties, including the Bordigist organisations, had degenerated into "gangs" or "rackets" that function as "illusory communities" and merely reproduce the logic of capital. He criticised the unthinking valorisation of violent negation within anticapitalist milieus, which he argued could lead to a "repressive consciousness" that blocked genuine revolt. He rejected all forms of political representation as an "obstacle to a fusion of forces" and called for revolutionaries to pursue theoretical development in an "autonomous and personal fashion".

By 1973, in texts such as "The Wandering of Humanity" and "Against Domestication", Camatte had completed his break with Marxism. He argued that capital had now achieved total, real domination over society. In this new phase, capitalism had overcome the law of value and its tendency toward crisis, and had effectively negated the existence of social classes through the universalisation of wage labour, creating a "collection of slaves of capital". For Camatte, it was no longer the proletariat that was exploited, but "humanity" as a whole. He came to see the historical workers' movement as inherently reformist, arguing that the working class's struggles had only served to further its integration into the capitalist community. Reflecting on this period, Camatte identified the moment when the number of unproductive workers in the United States surpassed that of productive workers in 1956 as a key turning point, confirming for him that the proletariat was ceasing to be the revolutionary class.

Camatte directed his critique at Marxism itself, which he accused of being a theory of development that glorified the growth of productive forces. This developmentalist project, he argued, was part of the "wandering of humanity" away from its natural communal being. This "wandering," he contended, began not with capitalism but with humanity's original separation from nature. According to Camatte, this break was not a malicious act but a necessary choice made in response to objective threats to the species' survival, such as natural disasters and predators. This separation led to the development of agriculture, animal husbandry, private property, patriarchy, and the state. Concluding that Marxism was simply another apology for industrial society, he declared that "it becomes increasingly imbecilic to proclaim oneself a Marxist".

== Later thought ==
In his post-Marxist work, Camatte replaced the project of proletarian revolution with the broader goal of "re-establish[ing] community", a direct return to his concept of Gemeinwesen. He argued that this new revolution would entail a complete break with humanism, scientism, and technology, which he saw as determined by the capitalist mode of production rather than being neutral tools. Instead of dominating nature, humanity must seek "reconciliation with and regeneration of nature". In his 1989 text "Émergence et Dissolution," Camatte outlined a "program for the regeneration of the biosphere". Its proposals included a halt to the construction of new roads and cities; an end to hunting, fishing, and large-scale animal husbandry; the abolition of tourism and professional sports; and the abandonment of nuclear power. More broadly, the project implies the "destruction of urbanization" in favour of multiple small communities, the diminishment of the transportation system, the end of monoculture, and a halt to population growth.

For Camatte, the revolutionary process was no longer about a struggle against a class of oppressors; he argued for abandoning the friend-enemy distinction, stating "I have no enemies." He came to view all people, including those in power, as functionally part of capital's dynamic and equally suffering from the loss of naturalness. In the 1980s, influenced by the work of psychoanalyst Alice Miller, Camatte developed the concepts of speciosis (the neurosis of the human species) and ontosis (the neurosis of the individual being). He used these concepts to analyze humanity's "wandering" as a form of collective madness rooted in the "domestication" process, which he defined as the parental repression of naturalness in children to adapt them to a world separated from nature. He argued that this process leads to a confusion of natural gender roles—which he defined as motherhood for women and a protective function for men—and that their modern interchangeability is a symptom of capital's abstraction of life.

The question of a revolutionary subject for this project remains a difficult one in Camatte's thought. Having concluded that the working class was fully integrated, he asked, "How can destroyed human beings rebel?" His work offers few clear answers, occasionally gesturing toward youth who are "not yet fully domesticated" or peoples in the developing world who have not "fully succumbed to the despotism of capital". He came to see the global decline in birth rates that began in the late 1960s as a potential expression of a spontaneous "emergence" of forms of life no longer governed by capital's need to reproduce labour-power. The primary basis for revolution in his later thought appears to be a "moral appeal" and an existential desire to "rediscover the lost community" through an "act of creation". His solution is for individuals and small groups to "abandon this world" by rejecting its logic and living "as if" the human community were already a reality.

=== Holocaust revisionism controversy ===
In the 1980s, Camatte's writings on fascism generated significant controversy. Rooted in the Bordigist doctrine that anti-fascism was a bourgeois ideology that obscured the fundamental conflict between the proletariat and capital, his work extended to questioning the historiography of the Holocaust. In a 1982 article, "Évanescence du mythe anti-fasciste" (Evanescence of the Anti-Fascist Myth), he addressed the work of French Holocaust denier Paul Rassinier. While criticising Rassinier's antisemitism, Camatte wrote that because the "anti-fascist myth" was so foundational to the post-war order, "it is impossible to obtain irrefutable scientific proof of the number of Jews killed as claimed by the Zionists and their allies ... the same applies to the existence or non-existence of the gas chambers."

The journal Endnotes has described these statements as a "serious and perhaps unforgivable misjudgment" resulting from a "reductio ad revolutionem"—the tendency to reduce all political questions to the singular conflict between capital and revolution. This led Camatte to refuse what he saw as the "false dichotomy" between fascism and anti-fascism, a stance that resulted in an "unacceptable and bizarre conclusion". At the same time, Camatte's other writings from the period expressed opposition to antisemitism and analysed its historical roots, arguing that the creation of the State of Israel was a product of the defeat of the international workers' movement.

== Later years and death ==
In his later years, Camatte lived in the French countryside between Toulouse and Bordeaux at a self-renovated farmhouse he named "Domaine de la certitude" (Domain of Certainty). He put his philosophy of "abandoning this world" into practice through a life of rustic simplicity, practicing permaculture, planting trees, and maintaining a physical discipline that included martial arts and running. His lifestyle reflected his theoretical call to exit the logic of capital and re-establish a direct, non-alienated relationship with nature and human activity. Camatte died in Cajarc on 19 April 2025, at the age of 90.

== Legacy ==
Camatte's later thought is considered a "pioneering" and "significant" contribution to the current of primitivism and anarcho-primitivism. The American theorist and writer Fredy Perlman, who had encountered Camatte's work in the early 1970s, translated "The Wandering of Humanity" in 1975. Perlman's influential primitivist work Against His-Story, Against Leviathan! (1983) highlights Camatte's importance. Through Perlman's connections with the Detroit-based journal Fifth Estate, Camatte's ideas were disseminated among radical circles in the United States and he was cited by key primitivist thinkers such as John Zerzan and David Watson.

His analysis of real subsumption and its consequences for class identity was shared by other post-autonomist thinkers and became influential on the theoretical current of communization, which developed out of the French ultra-left in the decades following his break with Marxism. His work has also been compared to that of the social critic Ivan Illich, with both thinkers critiquing the erasure of gender distinctions by industrial society and sharing a nostalgia for a lost, harmonious community. In the 21st century, his views also went on to influence accelerationism, and his essay Decline of the Capitalist Mode of Production or Decline of Humanity? was featured in #Accelerate: The Accelerationist Reader.

Camatte's views and life inspired Rachel Kushner to write her 2024 novel Creation Lake, which was shortlisted for the 2024 Booker Prize; the character Bruno, around whom the book’s story revolves, bears a resemblance to him.

== Selected works ==
- "Origin and Function of the Party Form" (1961) – with Roger Dangeville
- "The Democratic Mystification" (1969)
- "On Organization" (1969)
- "Bordiga et la passion du communisme" (1972)
- "Against Domestication" (1973)
- "The Wandering of Humanity" (1973)
- "This World We Must Leave" (1974)
- "Capital and Community" (1988)

== See also ==
- Accelerationism
- Communization
