= Revolutionary defeatism =

Marxist concept

Revolutionary defeatism is a concept made most prominent by Vladimir Lenin during World War I. It is based on the Marxist idea of class struggle. Arguing that the proletariat could not win or gain when fighting a war under capitalism, Lenin declared its true enemy is the imperialist leaders who sent their lower classes into battle. Workers would gain more from their own nations' defeats, he argued, if the war could be turned into civil war and then international revolution.

Initially rejected by all but the more radical at the socialist Zimmerwald Conference in 1915, the concept gained from more and more socialists, especially in Russia in 1917 after it was forcefully reaffirmed in Lenin's "April Theses" as Russia's war losses continued, even after the February Revolution as the Provisional Government kept them in the conflict.

During World War I in the United Kingdom, the British socialist movement included a small minority of revolutionary defeatists such as John Maclean. Similarly, the Polish revolutionary Rosa Luxemburg and her German comrade Karl Liebknecht argued for revolutionary defeatism against the Social Democratic Party of Germany's pro-war stance. A notable opponent of this thought during WWI was Peter Kropotkin, a Russian anarcho-communist who claimed that the Entente were the lesser evil of the conflict and that Bolshevik Russia should have continued to support them against the Central Powers.

Revolutionary defeatism was also a policy of the International Communist Party under Amadeo Bordiga, which saw World War II as a reactionary war between two opposing empires, in contrast to the Communist Party of the Soviet Union and Chinese Communist Party who were then allied with Great Britain and the United States in a continuation of Dmitrov's Comintern Popular Front anti-fascist politics, which, following the invasion of the Soviet Union, changed their stance from neutrality and discouraging participation, to treating the war as a progressive fight for freedom and liberation from the Nazi regime.

== See also ==
- Accelerationism
- Proletarian internationalism
- No War but the Class War
