= Suzanne Voute =

- Born: 12 March 1922; Poitiers, France
- Died: 3 December 2001 (aged 79); Marseille, France
- Other names: Frederique
- Occupation: translator
- Known for: Leading Left Communist and translator of Karl Marx

Suzanne Voute (12 March 1922 – 3 December 2001) was a militant Left Communist active in France from the 1940s. She became a member of the team, alongside Maximilien Rubel and Michel Jacob who translated much of the work of Karl Marx into French for Gallimard.

== Early life ==
She was born in Poitiers to Jean-Marie Voute and Madeleine Berthelot in 1922. After spending some of her childhood in Haute-Marne, she attended Collège de Tournon, Tournon-sur-Rhône where studied chemistry and physics.

In 1942 she played a key role in organising the International Communist Left in Marseille. However she soon came into conflict with Robert Salama and Marc Chirik. She worked with Ottorino Perrone writing the Appeal to all revolutionary militants which appeared in May 1945 and which led to the foundation of the Fraction Française de la Gauche Communiste Internationale (FFGCI) which also included a number of Italian refugees based in France. The group was linked to the Internationalist Communist Party which had just been founded in Italy by Onorato Damen and the group of revolutionaries around the journal Prometeo.

In 1957 when the French section of the ICP started to publish Programme Communiste in Marseille she moved to South East France from Paris becoming a prominent but anonymous writer amongst the contributors.
