= Anti-bolshevism =

Anti-bolshevism may refer to:

- Council communism, a current of socialist thought
- Anti-communism, opposition to communism
- Anti-Leninism, opposition to the political philosophy of Vladimir Lenin
- Anti-Stalinist left, a leftist current opposed to the political philosophy of Joseph Stalin
- Anti-Sovietism, opposition to the government of the Soviet Union
- Ultra-leftism, a term widely used against highly sectarian communist groups of which many are anti-Leninist
