= Chirik =

Chirik is a surname. Notable people with the surname include:

- Marc Chirik (1907–1990), communist revolutionary
- Paul Chirik (born 1973), American chemist
