= Ultra-leftism =

Broad Marxist current

In Marxism, ultra-leftism encompasses a broad spectrum of revolutionary Marxist currents. Ultra-leftism distinguishes itself from other left-wing currents through its rejection of electoralism, trade unionism, and national liberation. "Ultra-left" is also commonly used as a pejorative by some Marxist–Leninists, or some Trotskyists, to refer to extreme or uncompromising Marxist sects.

== Historical usage ==
The term ultra-left is usually used to define a movement or branch of left communism developed by theorists such as Amadeo Bordiga, Otto Rühle, Anton Pannekoek, Herman Gorter, and Paul Mattick, and continuing with more recent writers, such as Jacques Camatte and Gilles Dauvé. This standpoint includes two main traditions, a Dutch-German tradition including Rühle, Pannekoek, Gorter, and Mattick, and an Italian tradition following Bordiga. These traditions came together in the 1960s French ultra-gauche. The political theorist Nicholas Thoburn refers to these traditions as the "actuality of the ultra-left".

The term originated in the 1920s in the German and Dutch workers movements, originally referring to a Marxist group opposed to both Bolshevism and social democracy, and with some affinities with anarchism.

The ultra-left is defined particularly by its breed of anti-authoritarian Marxism, which generally involves an opposition to the state and to state socialism, as well as to parliamentary democracy and wage labour. In opposition to Bolshevism, the ultra-left generally places heavy emphasis upon the autonomy and self-organization of the proletariat. It rejected the necessity of a revolutionary party and was described as permanently counterposing "the masses" to their leaders. Dauvé also explained:

The ultra-left was born and grew in opposition to Social Democracy and Leninism—which had become Stalinism. Against them, it affirmed the revolutionary spontaneity of the proletariat. The German communist left (in fact German-Dutch), and its derivatives, maintained that the only human solution lay in proletarians' own activity, without it being necessary to educate or to organize them ... Inheriting the mantle of the ultra-left after the war, the magazine Socialisme ou Barbarie appeared in France between 1949 and 1965.

One variant of ultra-leftist ideas was widely revived in the New Left of the 1960s, and particularly in the May 1968 moment in libertarian socialist movements such as Big Flame, the Situationist International, and autonomism.

== Pejorative usage ==
Used pejoratively, ultra-left is used to label positions that are adopted without taking notice of the current situation or of the consequences which would result from following a proposed course. The term is used to criticize leftist positions that, for example, are seen as overstating the tempo of events, propose initiatives that overestimate the current level of militancy, or which employ appeals to violence in their activism.

The mainstream Marxist critique of such a position began with Vladimir Lenin's "Left-Wing" Communism: An Infantile Disorder, which critiqued those (such as Anton Pannekoek or Sylvia Pankhurst) in the nascent Communist International who argued against cooperation with parliamentary or reformist socialists. Lenin characterized the left communism as a politics of purity—the doctrinal "repetition of the truths of 'pure' communism". Marxist-Leninists typically used the term against their rivals on the left: "the Communist Party's Betty Reid wrote that the CPGB made 'no exclusive claim to be the only force on the left', but dismissed its rivals as 'ultra-left'; that is, Trotskyist, anarchist, syndicalist or those who 'support the line of the Communist Party of China'", the latter of which is associated with anti-revisionism. Other Marxist-Leninist groups, such as the Movement for a Revolutionary Left, have also called rival Trotskyist and Maoist groups "ultra-left".

Trotskyists and others saw the Communist International as pursuing a strategy of unrealistic ultra-leftism during its Third Period, which the Communist International later conceded when it turned to a popular front strategy in 1934–35. The term was popularized in the United States by the Socialist Workers Party at the time of the Vietnam War, using it to describe opponents in the anti-war movement, including Gerry Healy.

Ultra-leftism is often associated with leftist sectarianism, in which a socialist organization might attempt to put its own short-term interests before the long-term interests of the working class and its allies. The term was used by the established currents of the Communist movement against "self-indulgent ultra-leftism [that] could only make it more difficult for the revolutionary left to win rank and file PCF members away from their leaders". For example, during the May 1968 events in France, ultra-leftism was initially associated with the opposition to the French Communist Party (PCF).

== See also ==
- Anti-Stalinist left
- Centrist Marxism
- Libertarian Marxism
- Left communism in China
