= Vanguardism =

Leninist political revolutionary ideology

Vanguardism is a core concept of Leninism which states that a revolutionary vanguard party, composed of the most conscious and disciplined workers, must lead the proletariat in overthrowing capitalism and establishing socialism, ultimately progressing to communism.

The vanguard works to engage the working class in revolutionary politics and to strengthen proletarian political power against the bourgeoisie.

This theory generally serves as a rationale for the leading role of the Communist party, which is often enshrined in the country's constitution if the party attains state power.

== Foundations ==
Vladimir Lenin popularised political vanguardism as conceptualised by Karl Kautsky, detailing his thoughts in one of his earlier works, What Is to Be Done?. Lenin argued that Marxism's complexity and the hostility of the establishment required that a close-knit group of individuals pulled from the working class become a vanguard of the greater whole to lead and safeguard the revolutionary ideology within the particular circumstances presented by the reactionary régime. While Lenin wished for a revolutionary organization akin to the contemporary Social Democratic Party of Germany, which was open to the people and more democratic in organization, the Russian autocracy prevented this.

Leninists argue that Lenin's ideal vanguard party would have open membership: "The members of the Party are they who accept the principles of the Party program and render the Party all possible support." This party could be completely transparent, at least internally: the "entire political arena is as open to the public view as is a theatre stage to the audience". A party that supposedly implemented democracy to such an extent that "the general control (in the literal sense of the term) exercised over every party man in the politics brings into existence an automatically operating mechanism which produces what in biology is called the 'survival of the fittest' ". The party would be completely open while educating the proletariat to remove the false consciousness that had been instilled in them.

In its first phase, the vanguard party would exist for two reasons. First, it would protect Marxism from corruption from other ideas, as well as advance its plans. Second, it would educate the proletariat in Marxism to cleanse them of their "false individual consciousness" and instill the revolutionary "class consciousness" in them.

Our task is not to champion the degrading of the revolutionary to the level of an amateur, but to raise the amateurs to the level of revolutionaries.

If the party is successful in their goal, on the eve of revolution, a critical mass of the working class population would be prepared to usher forth the transformation of society. Furthermore, a great number of them, namely their most dedicated members, would belong to the party cadres as professional revolutionaries, and would be elected to leadership positions by the mass party membership. Thus the organisation would quickly include the entire working class.

== Political party ==
A vanguard party is a political party at the fore of a population-wide political movement and of a revolution. In the praxis of revolutionary political science the vanguard party was composed of professional revolutionaries, first effected by the Bolshevik Party in the Russian Revolution of 1917. Lenin, the first leader of the Bolsheviks, never used the term vanguard party. According to Joel Geier, "The term 'vanguard party' appears not in [Lenin's] works but in Zinoviev's speeches and other documents from the Comintern's Fifth Congress. It is arguable that Lenin did not use the term 'vanguard party' because he did not believe in such a thing.". Nonetheless, as a political-science term, vanguard party most often is associated with Leninism; however, similar ideas (under different names) also are present in other revolutionary ideologies.

Friedrich Engels and Karl Marx briefly touch on the subject of advance guards helping the proletariat revolution in its progress; in Chapter II: "Proletarians and Communists" of The Communist Manifesto (1848), they said:

The Communists, therefore, are, on the one hand, practically the most advanced and resolute section of the working-class parties of every country, that section which pushes forward all others; on the other hand, theoretically, they have over the great mass of the proletariat the advantage of clearly understanding the lines of march, the conditions, and the ultimate general results of the proletarian movement. The immediate aim of the Communists is the same as that of all other proletarian parties: Formation of the proletariat into a class, overthrow of the bourgeois supremacy, conquest of political power by the proletariat.

According to Lenin, the purpose of the vanguard party is to establish a dictatorship of the proletariat; a rule of the working class. The change of ruling class, from the bourgeoisie to the proletariat, makes possible the full development of society. In early 20th-century Russia, Lenin argued that the vanguard party would lead the revolution to depose the incumbent Tsarist government, and transfer government power to the working class. In the pamphlet What is to be Done? (1902), Lenin said that a revolutionary vanguard party, mostly recruited from the working class, should lead the political campaign, because it was the only way that the proletariat could successfully achieve a revolution; unlike the economist campaign of trade union struggle advocated by other socialist political parties and later by the anarcho-syndicalists. Like Karl Marx, Lenin distinguished between the two aspects of a revolution: the economic campaign (labour strikes for increased wages and work concessions), which featured diffused leadership; and the political campaign (socialist changes to society), which featured the decisive revolutionary leadership of the vanguard party.

=== Marxism–Leninism ===
As he surveyed the European milieu in the late 1890s, Lenin found several theoretic problems with the Marxism of the late 19th century. Contrary to what Karl Marx had predicted, capitalism had become stronger in the last third of the 19th century. In Western Europe, the working class had become poorer; the workers and their trade unions, although they had continued to militate for better wages and working conditions, had failed to develop a revolutionary class consciousness, as predicted by Marx. To explain that undeveloped political awareness, Lenin said that the division of labour in a bourgeois capitalist society prevented the emergence of a proletarian class consciousness, because of the ten-to-twelve-hour workdays that the workers laboured in factories, which left them no time to learn and apply the philosophic complexities of Marxist theory. Finally, in trying to effect a revolution in Tsarist Imperial Russia (1721–1917), Lenin knew the problem of an autocratic régime that had outlawed almost all political activity. Although the Tsarist autocracy could not enforce a ban on political ideas, until 1905—when Tsar Nicholas II (ruled 1894–1917) agreed to the formation of a national duma—the Okhrana, the Tsarist secret police, suppressed every political group seeking social and political changes, including those with a democratic program. To counter such political conditions, Lenin said that a professional revolutionary organisation was necessary to organise and lead the most class-conscious workers into a politically cohesive movement. Concerning the Russian class struggle, in the book What Is to Be Done? (1902), against the "economist" trend of the socialist parties (who proposed that the working class would develop a revolutionary consciousness from demanding solely economic improvements), Lenin said that the "history of all countries bears out that, through their own powers alone, the working class can develop only a trade-union consciousness"; and that under reformist, trade-union leadership, the working class could only engage spontaneous local rebellions to improve their political position within the capitalist system, and that revolutionary consciousness developed unevenly. Nonetheless, optimistic about the working class's ability to develop a revolutionary class consciousness, Lenin said that the missing element for escalating the class struggle to revolution was a political organisation that could relate to the radicalism of political vanguard of the working class, who then would attract many workers from the middling ranks of the reformist leaders of the trade unions.

It is often believed that Lenin thought the bearers of class consciousness were the common intellectuals who made it their vocation to conspire against the capitalist system, educate the public in revolutionary theory, and prepare the workers for the proletarian revolution and the dictatorship of the proletariat that would follow. Yet, unlike his Menshevik rivals, Lenin distinguished himself by his hostility towards the bourgeois intelligentsia, and was routinely criticised for placing too much trust in the intellectual ability of the working class to transform society through its own political struggles.

Like other political organisations that sought to change Imperial Russian society, Lenin's Bolshevik Party resorted to conspiracy, and operated in the political underground. Against Tsarist repression, Lenin argued for the necessity of confining membership to people who were professionally trained to overthrow the Okhrana; however, at its core, the Bolshevik Party was an exceptionally flexible organisation which pragmatically adapted policy to changing political situations. After the Revolution of 1905, Lenin proposed that the Bolshevik Party "open its gates" to the unhappiest of the working class, who were rapidly becoming political radicals, in order for the Party to become a mass political party with genuine roots in the working class movement.

The notion of a 'vanguard', as used by Lenin before 1917, did not necessarily imply single-party rule but a vanguard "movement". Lenin considered the Social-Democrats (Bolsheviks) the leading elements of a multi-class (and multi-party) democratic struggle against Tsarism. This was also the situation established in 1917 by the February Revolution. And for a period after the October Revolution, the Bolsheviks (now renamed the Communist Party) operated in the soviets, trade unions, and other working-class mass organisations with other revolutionary parties, such as Mensheviks, Social-Revolutionaries and anarcho-communists, and local soviets often elected non-Bolshevik majorities. Lenin did consider the Bolsheviks the vanguard insofar as they were the most consistent defenders of Soviet power (which he considered the dictatorship of the proletariat or 'Commune-state'). However, the situation changed drastically during the Russian Civil War and economic collapse, which decimated the working class and its independent institutions, and saw the development of irreconcilable conflicts between the Bolsheviks and their rivals. At the 10th Congress of the Russian Communist Party (Bolsheviks) in 1921, the Party made the de facto reality de jure by outlawing opposition parties and formalising single-Party rule.

In Lenin's view, Russia was massive but inert, with a patiently suffering peasant majority and a proletarian minority, who could be progressive only when led by "shrewd, calculating, ruthless, and highly-educated" upper-classes Russians; so those intellectuals should create a party to organize the proletariat to seize power in the proletariat's interest, thence "the right and the duty to wipe out all other parties".

From 1936 onward, Communist-inspired state constitutions enshrined the "father your own family and let your families live in a nation with society" rubric by giving the Communist parties formal leadership in society—a provision that was interpreted to either ban other parties altogether or force them to accept the Communists' guaranteed right to rule as a condition of being allowed to exist as an alternative party. Robert Mayer wrote that Lenin redefined class identity to exclude dissenters, effectively stripping workers who opposed Bolshevik rule of their proletarian status and democratic rights. This strategy allowed Lenin to suppress opposition while maintaining the illusion of proletarian democracy.

In the 20th century, the Communist Party of the Soviet Union (CPSU) continued regarding itself as the institutionalisation of Marxist–Leninist political consciousness in the Soviet Union; therein lay the justification for its political control of Soviet society. Article 6 of the 1977 Soviet Constitution refers to the CPSU as the "leading and guiding force of Soviet society, and the nucleus of its political system, of all state organizations and public organizations". The CPSU, precisely because it was the bearer of Marxist–Leninist ideology, determined the general development of society, directed domestic and foreign policy, and "imparts a planned, systematic, and theoretically substantiated virtuosity" to the struggle of the Soviet people for the victory of communism.

Nonetheless, the politics of the vanguard party, as outlined by Lenin, is disputed among the contemporary communist movement. Lenin's contemporary in the Bolshevik Party, Leon Trotsky, further developed and established the vanguard party with the creation of the Fourth International. Trotsky, who believed in permanent revolution, proposed that a vanguard party must be an international political party.

=== Frankfurt School ===
For some in the Frankfurt School such as Herbert Marcuse, the lumpenproletariat (the underclass, usually lacking class consciousness) have the potential to be supporters of the revolution. For others in the Frankfurt School such as Jürgen Habermas, they held views similar to that of Marx and classical Marxists who viewed the lumpenproletariat as likely counter-revolutionaries. The argument is that this underclass has the potential to help change the status quo because they are excluded from it and survive largely outside of the capitalist system. Marx viewed the lumpenproletariat with suspicion and as a reserve army of labour with a primarily counter-revolutionary character unlike the proletariat, whose role in production led Marx see them as the primary agents of change. For others, the lumpenproletariat existing outside the capitalist production process gives them the unique ability to attack the capitalist system from outside which other revolutionary elements can not.

=== Other uses ===
Although Lenin honed the idea in terms of a class leadership forged out of a proletarian vanguard specifically to describe Marxist–Leninist parties, the term is also used for many kinds of movement shaping themselves as initially guided by a small elite. Theodor Herzl, the theorist of Zionism, believed legitimation from the majority would only hinder from the outset his movement and therefore advised that "we cannot all be of one mind; the gestor will therefore simply take the leadership into his hands and march in the van." Herzl's principle antedated by some years the Leninist idea of Bolshevism as the vanguard of the revolution by characterizing the "Zionist movement as a vanguard of the Jewish people." The Youth Guard at the forefront of Zionist mobilization in the Yishuv likewise conceived of itself as a revolutionary vanguard, and the kibbutz movement itself is said to have thought of itself as a 'selfless vanguard'.

Vanguardism is occasionally used with of certain Islamist parties. Writers Abul Ala Maududi and Sayyid Qutb both urged the formation of an Islamic vanguard to restore Islamic society. Qutb discussed of an Islamist vanguard in his book Ma'alim fi al-Tariq (Milestones) and Maududi formed the radical Islamist party Jamaat-e-Islami in Pakistan whose goal was to establish a pan-Ummah worldwide Islamist ideological state starting from Pakistan, administered for God (Allah) solely by Muslims "whose whole life is devoted to the observance and enforcement" of Islamic law (Shari'ah), leading to the world becoming the House of Islam. The party members formed an elite group (called arkan) with "affiliates" (mutaffiq) and then "sympathizers" (hamdard) beneath them. Today, the Jamaat-e-Islami has spread wings to other South Asian countries with large Muslim populations, such as Afghanistan, Bangladesh and India.

The literature of the Baháʼí Faith also frequently refers to those serving to raise the capacities of communities around the world as the "vanguard" of the Cause of Baha'u'llah.

According to Roger Eatwell, some fascist parties have also operated in ways similar to the concept of a vanguard party. Most notably groups adhering to Siege-culture.

== See also ==
- Authoritarian socialism
- Blanquism
- Bonapartism
- Bureaucratic collectivism
- Cadre (politics)
- Democratic centralism
- Dictatorship of the proletariat
- Elite theory
- Foco
- Ivory tower
- Jacobinism
- Maoism
- Mass line
- New class
- Organic centralism
- Avant-garde
