= Internationalist Communist Party =

Internationalist Communist Party may refer to:

- Internationalist Communist Party (France), a French political party
- Internationalist Communist Party (Italy), an Italian political party
