= Organic centralism =

Method of political organisation

Organic centralism is a method of political organisation advocated by party-oriented left communists, in particular the Italian Left. It emphasizes a structure within communist parties that mirrors organic processes, rather than mechanical prescriptions.

== Overview ==
The concept was advanced in The Lyon Theses (1926) in the context of the Third International:

"The communist parties must achieve an organic centralism which, whilst including maximum possible consultation with the base, ensures a spontaneous elimination of any grouping which aims to differentiate itself. This cannot be achieved with, as Lenin put it, the formal and mechanical prescriptions of a hierarchy, but through correct revolutionary politics."

"The repression of [factionalism] isn't a fundamental aspect of the evolution of the party, though preventing it is."

This text then argues that factionalism would be positive where it arises in response to the relapse of the party into opportunism, as particularly illustrated by the split between Bolsheviks and Mensheviks. However, Amadeo Bordiga then argued that "bourgeois tendencies" are not manifested in factionalism, but "as a shrewd penetration stoking up unitary demagoguery and operating as a dictatorship from above".

The concept was put forward as against Bolshevisation.

"One negative effect of so-called Bolshevisation has been the replacing of conscious and thoroughgoing political elaboration inside the party, corresponding to significant progress towards a really compact centralism, with superficial and noisy agitation for mechanical formulas of unity for unity's sake, and discipline for discipline's sake.

This method causes damage to both the party and the proletariat in that it holds back the realisation of the «true» communist party. Once applied to several sections of the International it becomes itself a serious indication of latent opportunism. At the moment, there doesn't appear to be any international left opposition within the Comintern, but if the unfavourable factors we have mentioned worsen, the formation of such an opposition will be at the same time both a revolutionary necessity and a spontaneous reflex to the situation."(ibid)

The concept remains utilized by the International Communist Party (ICP).

"The meaning of unitarism and of organic centralism is that the party develops inside itself the organs suited to the various functions, which we call propaganda, proselytism, proletarian organisation, union work, etc., up to tomorrow, the armed organisation; but nothing can be inferred from the number of comrades destined for such functions, as on principle no comrade must be left out of any of them."

== Criticism ==
The socialist Adam Buick has argued that Bordiga's concept of organic separatism creates a technocratic elite which will become de facto controllers – and hence owners – of the totality of the means of production.

== See also ==
- Democratic centralism
