= Internationalist Communist Party (Italy) =

Internationalist Communist Party Partito Comunista Internazionalista
- Founded: 1943
- Split from: PCI
- Newspaper: Battaglia Comunista
- Ideology: Left communism Anti-Stalinism; Proletarian internationalism
- International affiliation: Internationalist Communist Tendency

Party flag

Website
- http://www.leftcom.org/en (English website) http://www.leftcom.org/it (Italian website)

The Internationalist Communist Party (Italian: Partito Comunista Internazionalista, PCInt) is a left communist party in Italy and an affiliate of the Internationalist Communist Tendency, formerly the International Bureau for the Revolutionary Party.

== History ==
The origins of the party can be traced back to the Left Fraction which, between 1921–26, held a majority within the Communist Party of Italy.

The Internationalist Communist Party itself was founded in 1943 by Onorato Damen and the group of revolutionaries around the journal Prometeo. It denounced the Second World War as imperialist and took an active part in the strike wave that shook northern Italy at the end of 1943. Also in 1943 Italian exiles played a significant role in founding the Fraction Française de la Gauche Communiste Internationale in France, which maintained close links with the PCInt.

In 1952 Amadeo Bordiga split the party to form his own International Communist Party.

The basic positions of Battaglia Comunista were as follows:

- Rosa Luxemburg and not Lenin was right on the national question.
- The old Communist Parties (now fully Stalinised) were not centrist but bourgeois.
- There was no hope of conquering the unions, and new strategies towards the daily class struggle would have to be evolved to connect the daily struggle of the class to the longer-term struggle for communism.
- The USSR was neither a communist or socialist society but state capitalist.
- There could be no substitution of the party for the class as a whole.

The party initiated a series of conferences of the communist left in the late 1970s and early 1980s. As a result of these, in 1983 they established the International Bureau for the Revolutionary Party (later renamed as the Internationalist Communist Tendency) with the British Communist Workers' Organisation.

== Election results ==
=== Constituent Assembly ===
Election	Votes	%	Seats
1946	24,644	0.10	0

=== Chamber of Deputies ===
Election	Votes	%	Seats
1948	20,736	0.08	0

== See also ==
- Communist Party (British Section of the Third International)
- International Communist Party
- Internationalist Communist Party (France)
