= Marc Chirik =

Communist revolutionary (1907–1990)

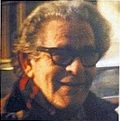
- Born: May 13, 1907; Kishinev, Russian Empire
- Died: December 20, 1990 (aged 83); Paris
- Other names: Marc Laverne, MC
- Known for: One of the founders of the International Communist Current

Marck Chirik (May 13, 1907 – December 20, 1990), also known as Marc Laverne or simply MC, was a communist revolutionary and one of the founding militants of the International Communist Current.

== Life ==
Chirik was born into the family of a rabbi. He had witnessed the October Revolution with his brother at the age of ten. His family moved to Palestine where he became an early member of the Communist Party of Palestine's youth organization in 1922 but was later expelled because he disagreed with the positions of the Communist International on the national question, which supported the Arab national movements.

He emigrated to France, where he joined the French Communist Party before being expelled at the same time as the members of the Left Opposition. He became a member first of the (Trotskyist) Ligue Communiste and then of Union Communiste, which he left in 1938 to join the Italian Fraction of the International Communist Left (ICL), since he agreed with the latter's position on the Spanish Civil War against that of Union Communiste. During the war and the German occupation of France, the ICL's International Bureau led by Vercesi considered that there was no purpose in the fractions’ continuing their work. He however pushed for the reconstitution of the Italian Fraction around a small nucleus in Marseille. He joined the Fraction Française de la Gauche Communiste Internationale which had been formed in 1943 and was close to Amadeo Bordiga. However, he split with the Bordigist tendency in May 1945, when he opposed the decision of the Italian Fraction's conference to dissolve the fraction, its militants joining the recently formed Partito Comunista Internazionalista as individuals and formed Gauche Communiste de France.

After Gauche Communiste de France dissolved in 1952 he left France for Venezuela in anticipation of World War III. He stayed there until 1968, developing a small current of revolutionaries in a group called Internacionalismo, then returned to France, where he and some of his Venezuelan recruits launched Revolution Internationale (RI), the only French left communist group after 1968 that attempted to systematically build an organization in the shadow of the larger left communist groups.

In 1975, the International Communist Current was founded by Revolution Internationale (France), World Revolution (UK), Internationalism (USA), Rivoluzione Internazionale (Italy), Internationalism (Venezuela) and Accion Proletaria (Spain). Chirik had been a leading member of two of these groups and he became a very important militant of the ICC until his death in 1990.

Marc Chirik is one of the main characters in World Without Visas, a novel by Jean Malaquais that takes place in Marseille during the Second World War.
