= 1974 Swiss referendums =

Four referendums were held in Switzerland in 1974. The first was held on 20 October on a popular initiative "against foreign infiltration and overpopulation", and was rejected by voters. The next three were held on 8 December on an amendment to the federal budget (rejected), restricting federal expenditure (approved) and a popular initiative (and counterproposal) on social health insurance (both of which were rejected).

== Results ==
=== October: Foreign infiltration and overpopulation ===
Choice	Popular vote		Cantons		
Choice	Votes	%	Full	Half	Total
For	878,891	34.2	0	0	0
Against	1,691,632	65.8	19	6	22
Blank votes	28,338	–	–	–	–
Invalid votes	5,190	–	–	–	–
Total	2,604,051	100	19	6	22
Registered voters/turnout	3,702,498	70.3	–	–	–
Source: Nohlen & Stöver

=== December: Federal budget ===
Choice	Popular vote		Cantons		
Choice	Votes	%	Full	Half	Total
For	625,780	44.4	4	0	4
Against	783,894	55.6	15	6	18
Blank votes	54,804	–	–	–	–
Invalid votes	2,303	–	–	–	–
Total	1,466,781	100	19	6	22
Registered voters/turnout	3,706,105	39.6	–	–	–
Source: Nohlen & Stöver

=== December: Spending restrictions ===
Choice	Popular vote		Cantons		
Choice	Votes	%	Full	Half	Total
For	934,633	67.0	19	6	22
Against	460,236	33.0	0	0	0
Blank votes	67,782	–	–	–	–
Invalid votes	2,583	–	–	–	–
Total	1,465,234	100	19	6	22
Registered voters/turnout	3,706,105	39.5	–	–	–
Source: Nohlen & Stöver

=== December: Social health insurance ===
Choice	Popular initiative					Counterproposal				
Choice	Popular vote		Cantons			Popular vote		Cantons		
Choice	Votes	%	Full	Half	Total	Votes	%	Full	Half	Total
For	384,155	26.7	0	0	0	457,923	31.8	0	0	0
Against	1,010,103	70.2	19	6	22	833,179	61.4	19	6	22
No answer	44,079	3.1	–	–	–	97,235	6.8	–	–	–
Blank votes	19,731	–	–	–	–	19,731	–	–	–	–
Invalid votes	14,094	–	–	–	–	14,094	–	–	–	–
Total	1,472,162	100	19	6	22	1,472,162	100	19	6	22
Registered voters/turnout	3,708,105	39.7	–	–	–	3,708,105	39.7	–	–	–
Source: Direct Democracy
