= Fraction Française de la Gauche Communiste Internationale =

- Abbreviation: FFGCI
- Founder: Suzanne Voute; Robert Salama; Marc Chirik
- Founded: 1943
- Dissolved: 1951
- Newspaper: L'Étincelle
- Ideology: Left communism Anti-Stalinism
- Political position: Far-left

The Fraction Française de la Gauche Communiste Internationale (FFGCI) was a left communist political group which existed in France between 1943 and 1951.
