= Bolshevization =

1920s pressure by the USSR on the Comintern to follow Marxism–Leninism

Logo of the Comintern World Congress

Bolshevization of the Communist International has at least two meanings. First it meant to independently change the way of working of new communist parties, such as the Communist Party of Great Britain (CPGB) in the early 1920s. Secondly was the process from 1924 by which the pluralistic Communist International (Comintern) and its constituent Communist parties were increasingly subject to pressure by the Soviet government in Moscow. With the development within Soviet Communism of Marxism–Leninism under Joseph Stalin, this latter Bolshevization became more clearly Stalinization. The autonomy of national Communist parties was downplayed and the Comintern became a tool of Soviet foreign policy.

== Bolshevization before 1924 ==
Prior to 1924, Bolshevization included that parties affiliated to the Comintern were based on the principles of democratic centralism. This meant that political decisions reached by voting in national parties were binding upon all members and that all democratic decisions of the Comintern, and of its elected Executive Committee, were binding on member parties. Bolshevization also included a transformation of the organization of Communist parties, for example the Communist Party of Great Britain from 1922. The various parties that had merged to form it had more informal control by individuals rather than a democratic centralist structure. The party also wanted to change to ensure that it would not be one where "as a rule very few members do the work while others are inactive and apathetic" but rather one where "every member would have to be a working member".

== From 1924 ==
During the 5th World Congress of the Comintern in 1924, "A new policy of Bolshevization" was adopted, which dragooned the Communist parties toward stricter bureaucratic centralism. This flattened out the earlier diversity of radicalisms, welding them into a single approved model of Communist organization. Respect for Bolshevik achievements and defense of the Russian Revolution were by now transmuted into dependency on Moscow and belief in Soviet infallibility. Depressing cycles of "internal rectification" began, disgracing and expelling successive leaderships, so that by the later 1920s many founding Communists had gone. This process of coordination, in a hard-faced drive for uniformity, was finalized at the next World Congress of the Comintern in 1928.

Over time, along with the development of Stalinism in the Communist Party of the Soviet Union (CPSU), this 1924-style Bolshevization became more clearly Stalinization. One view on this process can be seen by utilizing insights from Sovietologists to argue that Stalinism constituted a politics and practice connected with but distinct from Bolshevism. Reviewing Comintern and party history, a specific periodization can be outlined: state Bolshevism, 1919–1923, which saw subjugation of the CPGB and Communist Party USA (CPUSA) to Russian imperatives; incipient Stalinism, 1924–1928, which witnessed restructuring of the politics of subordination; and from 1929 onwards, when Stalinization accomplished a distinctive subordination.

The 6th World Congress of the Comintern in 1928 took a radical turn as the Comintern decided that capitalism was reaching its final stages. There was less support for wars of national liberation in colonial regions, especially after the collapse of the Comintern in China.

In specific countries

In the Communist Party of Italy (CPd'I), the party secretary Antonio Gramsci took the lead in promoting Bolshevization. In Prague, it was Klement Gottwald who came to power in the Communist Party of Czechoslovakia (KSČ) by taking charge of Bolshevization. A number of senior Communist Party of Germany (KPD) leaders, in exile in the Soviet Union, were caught up in Stalin's Great Purge of 1937–1938 and executed.

== Other meanings ==
In Great Britain, the Communists were defeated in their efforts to Bolshevize and take over the Labour Party. In Finland, the Communists failed to Bolshevize the main socialist movement.
