= Amadeo Bordiga =

Italian Marxist theorist and politician (1889–1970)

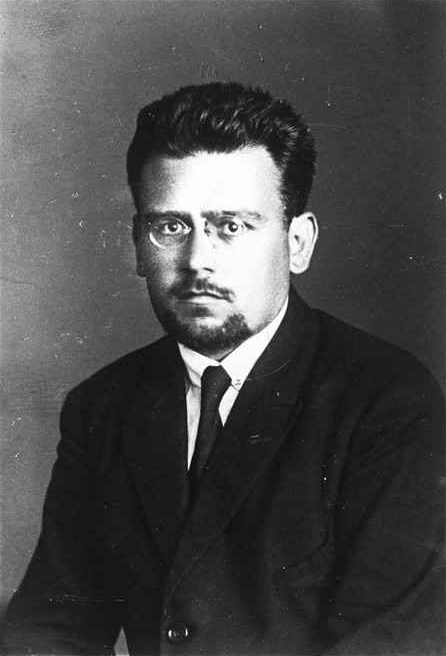
- Bordiga c. 1926

General Secretary of the Communist Party of Italy
- In office January 1921 – January 1924
- Preceded by: Office established
- Succeeded by: Antonio Gramsci

Personal details
- Born: 13 June 1889 Resina, Kingdom of Italy
- Died: 23 July 1970 (aged 81) Formia, Italy
- Party: PSI (1910–1921); PCdI (1921–1930); PCInt (1943–1952); ICP (1952–1970)
- Spouses: Ortensia De Meo (m. 1914; died 1955) Antonietta De Meo (m. 1965; died 1970)
- Education: University of Naples

Amadeo Bordiga (Italian pronunciation: [a.maˈdɛ.o borˈdi.ɡa]; 13 June 1889 – 23 July 1970) was an Italian Marxist theorist, revolutionary socialist, and politician. He was most prominent in the 1920s when he founded the Communist Party of Italy (PCdI). He fell out of favor with the party as it embraced Bolshevization and was expelled in March 1930. Later in life, he was a leading figure of the International Communist Party (ICP), for which he wrote his most influential works. His writings emphasized an "invariant" party program, proletarian internationalism, and anti-reformism. Bordiga is a central figure of the communist left.

== Early life, family, and education ==
Bordiga was born in Resina, Campania in 1889. His father, Oreste Bordiga, was an experienced scholar of agricultural science, particularly regarding the longstanding agricultural problems in Southern Italy. His mother, Zaira degli Amadei, was descended from an ancient Florentine family, and his maternal grandfather, Count Michele Amadei, was a conspirator in the struggles of the Risorgimento. His paternal uncle, Giovanni Bordiga was a mathematician and professor at the University of Padua who also participated as a militant in the Risorgimento.

He was introduced to the Italian Socialist Party (PSI) in 1910 by his secondary school physics teacher. Following this, Bordiga opposed the Italo-Turkish War, believing that it was a colonialist struggle for Libya. He founded a study group for communist theory called the "Karl Marx Circle" in 1912, which is where he met his first wife, Ortensia De Meo. Bordiga graduated with a degree in engineering from the University of Naples in November 1912. Bordiga married De Meo in 1914. They had two children, Alma and Oreste. Ortensia died in 1955, and ten years later, in 1965, Bordiga married Ortensia's sister, Antonietta De Meo.

== Political career ==
=== Italian Socialist Party ===
Within the newly founded "Karl Marx Circle", Bordiga rejected a pedagogical approach to political work and developed a "theory of the Party", whereby the organization was meant to display non-immediate goals as a rally of similarly minded people and not necessarily a body of the working class. Bordiga was deeply opposed to representative democracy, which he associated with bourgeois electoralism. In a 1914 issue of Il Socialista, he wrote: "Thus, if there is a complete negation of the theory of democratic action it is to be found in socialism." Bordiga opposed the parliamentary faction of the PSI being autonomous from central control. In common with most socialists in Latin countries, Bordiga campaigned against Freemasonry, which he identified as a non-secular group.

Following the October Revolution, Bordiga rallied to the communist movement and formed the communist abstentionist faction within the PSI, abstentionist in that it opposed participation in bourgeois elections. The group would form with the addition of the former L'Ordine Nuovo grouping in Turin around Antonio Gramsci, the backbone of the Communist Party of Italy (PCdI). This came after a long internal struggle in the PSI as it had voted as early as 1919 to affiliate with the Comintern but had refused to purge its reformist wing. In the course of the conflict, Bordiga attended the 2nd Comintern Congress in 1920, where he added two points to the Twenty-one Conditions of membership proposed by Vladimir Lenin. He was, nevertheless, criticized by Lenin in his 1920 work "Left-Wing" Communism: An Infantile Disorder over a disagreement regarding parliamentary abstentionism. Victor Serge, who witnessed the 2nd Comintern Congress, described Bordiga as "exuberant and energetic, features blunt, hair thick, black and bristly, a man quivering under his encumbrance of ideas, experiences and dark forecasts."

=== Communist Party of Italy ===
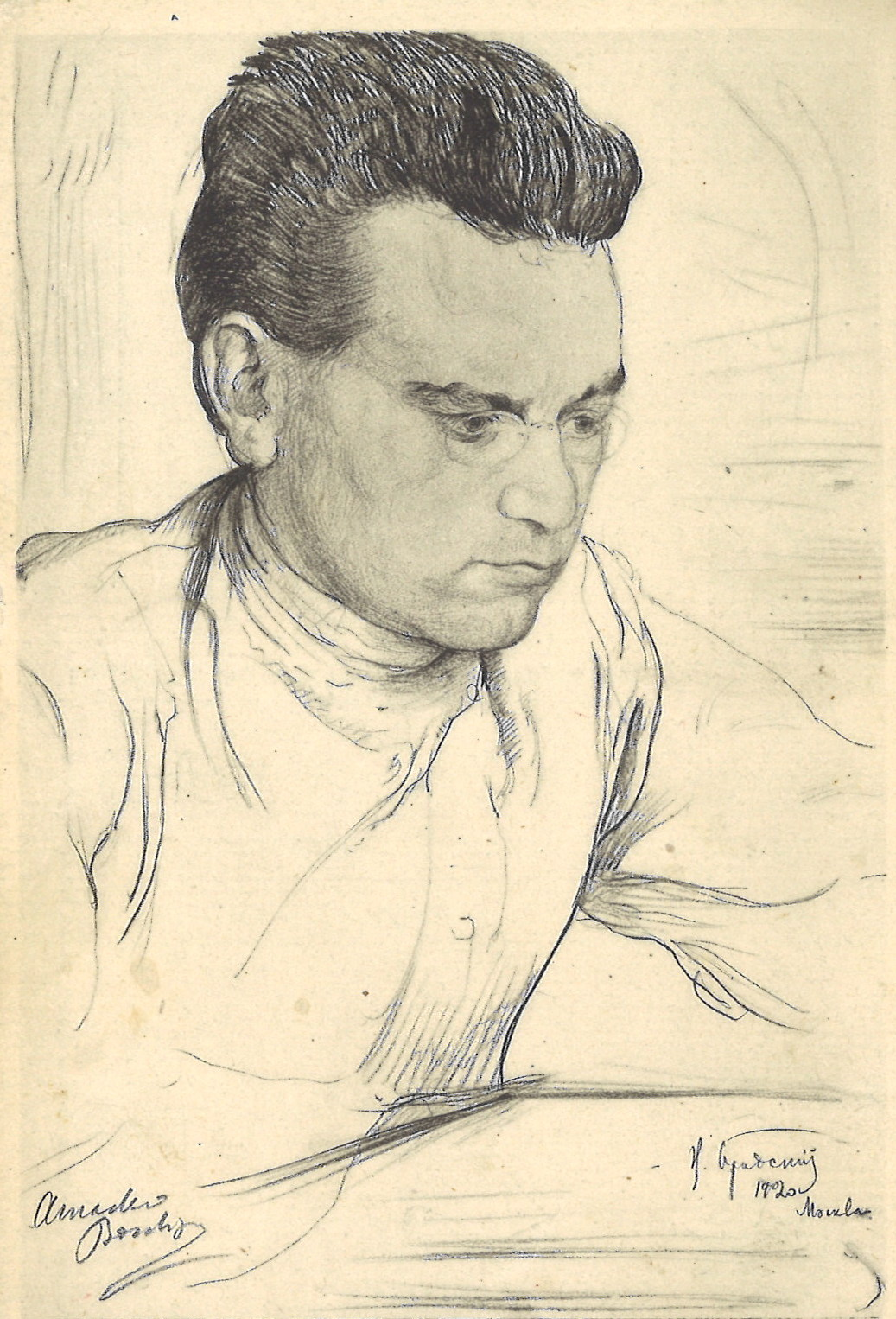
Bordiga in a 1920 drawing by Soviet painter Isaak Brodsky

When the PSI held its congress at Livorno in January 1921, representatives sent by the Comintern all insisted that the party must expel its reformist wing led by Filippo Turati, but were divided over whether to continue to work with Giacinto Menotti Serrati, who advised delaying the split. Bordiga advocated an immediate break with both Serrati and Turati, and hence with the majority of the PSI, and prevailed against the opposition of the leading Comintern representative Paul Levi but also with the backing of others, including Matyas Rakosi, the future Stalinist dictator of Hungary.

After the congress, Bordiga emerged as the leader of the newly formed Communist Party of Italy. He was one of five members of the executive but was "the actual director of all party activity". This position was accepted by the majority of the members of the PCdI but was to bring them into conflict with the Comintern when in 1921 the latter adopted a new tactic, i.e. that of the united front with reformist organisations to fight for social reforms and even to form a workers' government. Bordiga saw this as a reversion to the failed tactics of the pre-war social democrats that had turned them into reformists.

Out of a regard for discipline, Bordiga and his comrades (who became known as the Italian communist left) accepted the Comintern decision but were in an increasingly difficult position. When Bordiga was arrested in February 1923 on a trumped-up charge by the new government of Benito Mussolini, he had to give up his post as a member of the Central Committee of the PCdI. While acquitted later that year, Bordiga chose not to reclaim his post and implicitly accepted that he was now an oppositionist.

At the Fifth Congress of Comintern in Moscow held in June–July 1924, Bordiga was the sole voice who opposed any cooperation with socialist parties in favour of a "united front from below, not from above", which received support except within the Italian delegation. He argued that the rise of Mussolini and the Italian fascists was only "a change in the governing personnel of the bourgeois class." Also in 1924, the Italian communist left lost control of the PCdI to a pro-Moscow group whose leader Gramsci became the party's General Secretary in June. In March 1925, Bordiga refused to go to Moscow to attend a plenum of Comintern's executive, and in his absence was accused of taking up a "hostile position against Comintern by declaring his complete solidarity with Trotsky".

=== Under arrest ===
In December 1926, Bordiga was again arrested by Mussolini and sent to prison in Ustica, an Italian island in the Tyrrhenian Sea, where he met with Gramsci, and they renewed their friendship and worked alongside each other despite their political differences. Bordiga was concerned about Gramsci's ill health but nothing came of a plan to help him escape the island. In 1928, Bordiga was moved to the Isle of Ponza, where he built several houses, returning after his detention in 1929 to finish them.

=== Opposition ===
Following his release, Bordiga did not resume his activities in the PCdI and was in fact expelled in March 1930, accused of having "supported, defended and endorsed the positions of the Trotskyist opposition" and been organisationally disruptive. With his expulsion, Bordiga left political activity until 1943, and he was to refuse to comment on political affairs even when asked by trusted friends; many of his former supporters in the PCdI went into exile and founded a political tendency often referred to as Italian communist left.

According to the reports of Angelo Alliotta, a secret informant of the fascist police in Italy who visited Bordiga's home in Formia, where he holidayed with his wife, Bordiga showed support for the Axis powers. According to Alliotta, Bordiga believed Nazi Germany was weakening the "English giant", which to him was "the greatest exponent of capitalism", and thus the defeat of Britain would bring about revolutionary conditions in Europe. Bordiga also criticised Joseph Stalin for allying with the Western Allies against the Axis in April 1943.

=== International Communist Party ===
After 1944, Bordiga first returned to political activity in the Naples-based Fraction of Socialists and Communists. When this grouping was dissolved into the Internationalist Communist Party (PCInt), Bordiga did not initially join; despite this, he contributed anonymously to its press, primarily Battaglia Comunista and Prometeo, in keeping with his conviction that revolutionary work was collective in nature and his opposition to any form of even incipient personality cult. Bordiga joined the PCInt in 1949. When the current split in two in 1951, he took the side of the grouping that took on the name International Communist Party, publishing its Il Programma Comunista. Bordiga devoted himself to the party, contributing extensively. Bordiga remained with the ICP until his death at Formia in 1970.

== Theories and beliefs ==
=== On Marxism–Leninism ===
On the theoretical level, Bordiga developed an understanding of the Soviet Union as what he perceived as a capitalist society. Bordiga's writings on the perceived capitalist nature of the Soviet economy in contrast to those produced by the Trotskyists also focused on the agrarian sector. In analyzing the agriculture in the Soviet Union, Bordiga sought to display the perceived capitalist social relations that he believed existed in the kolkhoz and sovkhoz, one a cooperative farm and the other a wage-labour state farm. In particular, he emphasized how much of the national agrarian produce came from small privately owned plots (writing in 1950) and predicted the rates at which the Soviet Union would start importing wheat after Imperial Russia had been such a large exporter from the 1880s to 1914.

In Bordiga's conception of Marxism–Leninism, Joseph Stalin, and later Mao Zedong, Ho Chi Minh, and so on, were great Romantic revolutionaries, i.e. bourgeois revolutionaries. He felt that the Marxist–Leninist states that came into existence after 1945 were extending the bourgeois nature of prior revolutions that degenerated as all had in common a policy of expropriation and agrarian and productive development, which he considered negations of previous conditions and not the genuine construction of socialism.

=== On democracy ===
Bordiga defined himself as anti-democracy, believing himself to be following the tradition of Karl Marx and Friedrich Engels. Bordiga's hostility toward democracy was unrelated to the Stalinist narrative of the single-party state, as he saw fascism and Stalinism as the culmination of bourgeois democracy. Theorists influenced by Bordiga (e.g. Jacques Camatte and Ottorino Perrone) often state that there is no functional difference between democracy and dictatorship, as one class will inevitably establish control. To Bordiga, bourgeois democracy meant above all the manipulation of society as a formless mass. To this, he counterposed the dictatorship of the proletariat. He often referred to the spirit of Engels' remark that "on the eve of the revolution all the forces of reaction will be against us under the banner of 'pure democracy'" as every factional opponent of the Bolsheviks in 1921 from the monarchists (the White movement) to the anarchists, such as the Revolutionary Insurgent Army of Ukraine, called for soviets without Bolsheviks—or soviet workers councils not dominated by Bolsheviks. As such, Bordiga opposed the idea of revolutionary theory being the product of a democratic process of pluralist views, believing that the Marxist perspective has the merit of underscoring the fact that, like all social formations, communism is above all about the expression of programmatic content. This enforces the fact that, for Marxists, communism is not an ideal to be achieved but a real movement born from the old society with a set of programmatic tasks.

=== On the united front ===
Bordiga resolutely opposed the Comintern's turn to the right in 1921. As leader of the Communist Party of Italy, he refused to implement the united front strategy of the Third Congress. He also refused to fuse the newly formed party with the left wing of the Italian Socialist Party from which it had just broken away. Bordiga had a completely different view of the party from the Comintern, which was adapting to the revolutionary ebb that was announced in 1921 by the Anglo-Soviet Trade Agreement, the Kronstadt rebellion, the implementation of the New Economic Policy, the banning of factions, and the defeat of the March Action in Germany. For Bordiga, the Western European Communist parties' strategy of fighting this ebb by absorbing a mass of left-wing social democrats through the united front was a complete capitulation to the period of counter-revolutionary ebb he saw setting in. This was the base of his critique of democracy, for it was in the name of conquering the masses that the Comintern seemed to be making all kinds of programmatic concessions to left-wing social democrats. For Bordiga, the program was everything; a gate-receipt notion of numbers was nothing. The role of the party in the period of ebb was to preserve the program and to carry on the propaganda work possible until the next turn of the tide, not to dilute it while chasing ephemeral popularity.

Bordiga's analysis provided a way of seeing a fundamental degeneration in the world communist movement in 1921 (instead of in 1927 with the defeat of Trotsky) without simply calling for more democracy. The abstract formal perspective of bureaucracy/democracy, with which the Trotskyist tradition treats this crucial period in Comintern history, became separated from any content. Bordiga always identified as a Leninist and never polemicised against Lenin himself, but his sharply different understanding of the 1921 conjuncture, its consequences for the Comintern, and his disagreements with both Lenin and Trotsky over the united front tactic points to a turning point that later Trotskyist accounts in the international left opposition of the 1920s tended to obscure.

=== On communism ===
Bordiga, like Lenin, did not see socialism as a separate mode of production from communism but rather how communism looks as it emerges from capitalism before it has "developed on its own foundations". Bordiga used socialism to mean what Marx called the lower-phase communism. Sticking to Marx's concept of communism, for Bordiga both stages of socialist or communist society—with stages referring to historical materialism—were characterised by the absence of money, capital, the market, and so on, the difference between them being that earlier in the first stage rationing would be done in a way in which "a given amount of labor in one form is exchanged for an equal amount of labor in another form", with deductions being made from said labor to fund public projects, and difference in interests between the rural and urban proletariat would exist, whilst in communism "bourgeois law" would be no more, hence the equal standard applied to all peoples no longer would apply, and the alienated man "will not aim to win back his person" but rather become a new "Social Man". Arguing against what Bordiga saw as the bourgeois idea of "free producer economies", he instead declared that under communism, whether it be the lower stage or higher stage, production and consumption are both enslaved to society.

This view distinguished Bordiga from other Leninists and especially the Trotskyists, who tended and still tend to telescope the first two stages and so have money and the other exchange categories surviving into socialism; Bordiga would have none of this. For him, no society in which money, buying, and selling and the rest survived could be regarded as either socialist or communist—these exchange categories would die out before the socialist rather than the communist stage was reached. Within the Marxist movement, socialism was popularised during the Russian Revolution by Lenin. This view is consistent with and helped to inform early concepts of socialism in which the law of value no longer directs economic activity. Monetary relations in the form of exchange-value, profit, interest, and wage labour would not operate and apply to Marxist socialism.

== Legacy ==
Jacques Camatte began corresponding with Bordiga at the age of 19 in 1954, and Bordiga developed a long-standing relationship with Camatte and ideological influence over him. Camatte's early work very much reads in line with the Bordigist current, and Bordiga frequently contributed to Camatte's journal Invariance near the end of his life. Even after Camatte's break with Marxism following Bordiga's death, Camatte's preoccupation with the subject of Gemeinwesen (community, commonwealth) within Marx's work was consistent with Bordiga's emphasis on the anti-individualist and collectivist aspects of Marxism. Bordiga also influenced Gilles Dauvé, and had great influence over the ultra-leftist currents of the 20th and 21st centuries.

The Amadeo Bordiga Foundation was established in 1998 in Formia, in the house where Bordiga spent the last several months of his life. The foundation organizes publications of Bordiga's works and encourages further expansions upon his ideas. In August 2020, Historical Materialism published The Science and Passion of Communism, an anthology of English translations of Bordiga's work.

== Sources ==
- Bordiga, Amadeo (2020). The Science and Passion of Communism: Selected Writings of Amadeo Bordiga (1912-1965). Translated by Giacomo Donis. Leiden: Brill. ISBN 9789004234505.
- De Clementi, Andreina (1971). Amadeo Bordiga. Einaudi.
- El-Ojeili, Chamsy (2015). Beyond Post-Socialism: Dialogues With the Far-left. Houndsmills, Basingstoke, Hampshire: Palgrave Macmillan. ISBN 978-1-349-50157-1.
- Goldner, Loren (1995). "Amadeo Bordiga, the agrarian question and the international revolutionary movement" (PDF). Critique: Journal of Socialist Theory. 23 (1): 73–100. doi:10.1080/03017609508413387.
