= Jim Fletcher =

American actor (born 1963)

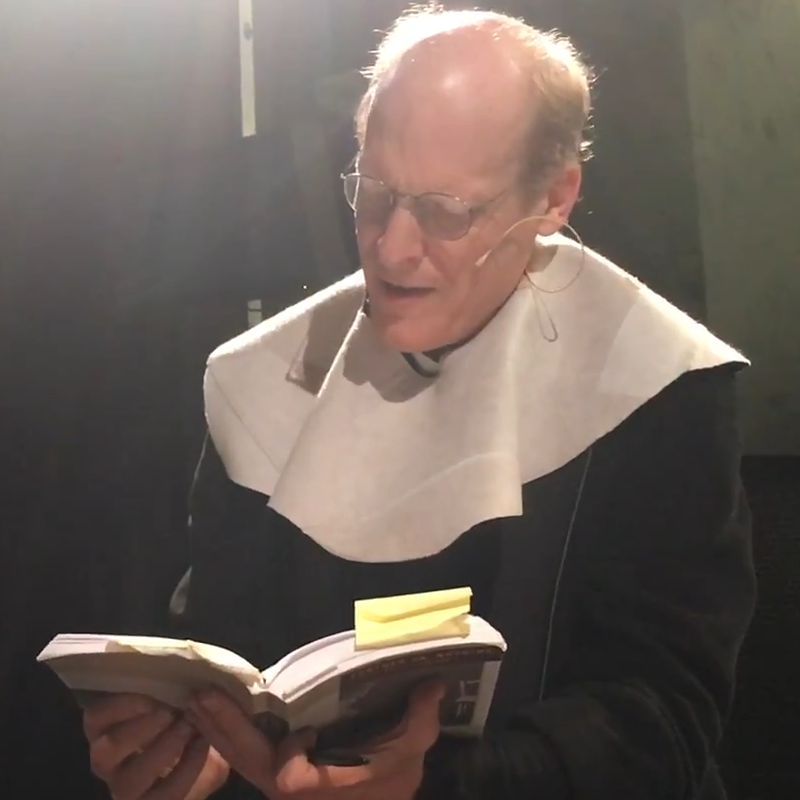
- Fletcher in 2017
- Born: 1963 (age 62–63); Ann Arbor, Michigan, U.S.
- Occupation: actor
- Years active: 1998 - present
- Known for: experimental theater
- Notable work: Gatz
- Awards: Obie Award

Jim Fletcher (born 1963) is an American actor. He won an Obie Award for his performance work, including in Gatz, a staging of the full text of the novel The Great Gatsby. The New York Times has described him as "a stalwart of the New York avant-garde scene."

== Early life ==
Fletcher was born in 1963 in Ann Arbor, Michigan. As a child, he assisted his father, a physician at the Veterans Affairs Medical Center in Washington, DC, by running the slideshows for his presentations.

Fletcher attended Columbia University. There, he met John Kelsey, and they both studied Sylvère Lotringer. He and Kelsey worked with Lotringer and Chris Kraus editing books for Semiotext(e), and would later both join Bernadette Corporation. Fletcher was involved in political work including with the movement to end South African apartheid and ACT UP.

Before becoming an actor, he worked various jobs including teacher, caseworker, pedicab driver, and dogwalker. He worked as an art handler for a decade before he started acting, a job he still did in 2008.

== Career ==
Fletcher began acting in 1998 at age 35. He has worked frequently with the director Richard Maxwell and is a founding member of Maxwell's New York City Players, as well as with Elevator Repair Service (ERS) and The Wooster Group. He has worked with choreographer Sarah Michelson and artists Tony Oursler and Laura Parnes. Notable roles include Jay Gatsby in Gatz, ERS's staging of The Great Gatsby, appearing alongside his father, Ross Fletcher, a medical doctor with no prior acting experience, who played Gatsby's father. He played Frankenstein's monster in Oursler's film Imponderable, and he played Jackson Pollock in the New York staging of Fabrice Melquiot's play Pollock.

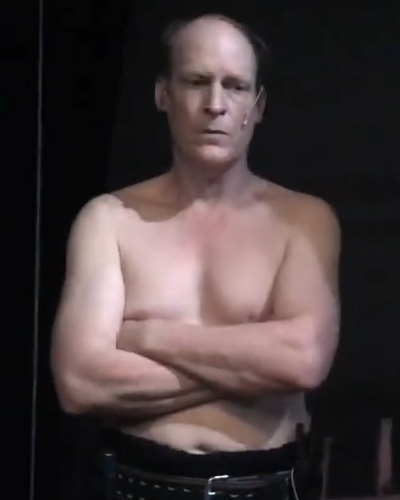
Fletcher in 2017

He co-wrote and appeared in the 2010 film Bass Ackwards.

With the Wooster Group, he has performed in A Pink Chair (In Place of a Fake Antique), Richard Foreman's Symphony of Rats, and Bertolt Brecht's The Mother. In the Wooster Group's adaptation of Troilus and Cressida, Cry, Trojans! Fletcher dressed as an "Indian."

In 2012, Fletcher was given an Obie Award for Sustained Excellence in Performance, including for Gatz.

Fletcher has written collaborative texts with the artist collective Bernadette Corporation. With Harry Mathews, he wrote a pamphlet for Semiotext(e)'s contribution to the 2014 Whitney Biennial, titled Week One. Fletcher has also written for Bomb magazine and Artforum.

Fletcher has performed in several pieces with the Native American artist collective New Red Order (Jackson Polys, Adam Khalil, and Zack Khalil), who invited him to dinner because of his "Indian" performance in Cry, Trojans.
