= Greenspon Gallery =

Art gallery in Manhattan, New York

Coordinates: 40.73102°N 74.00699°W

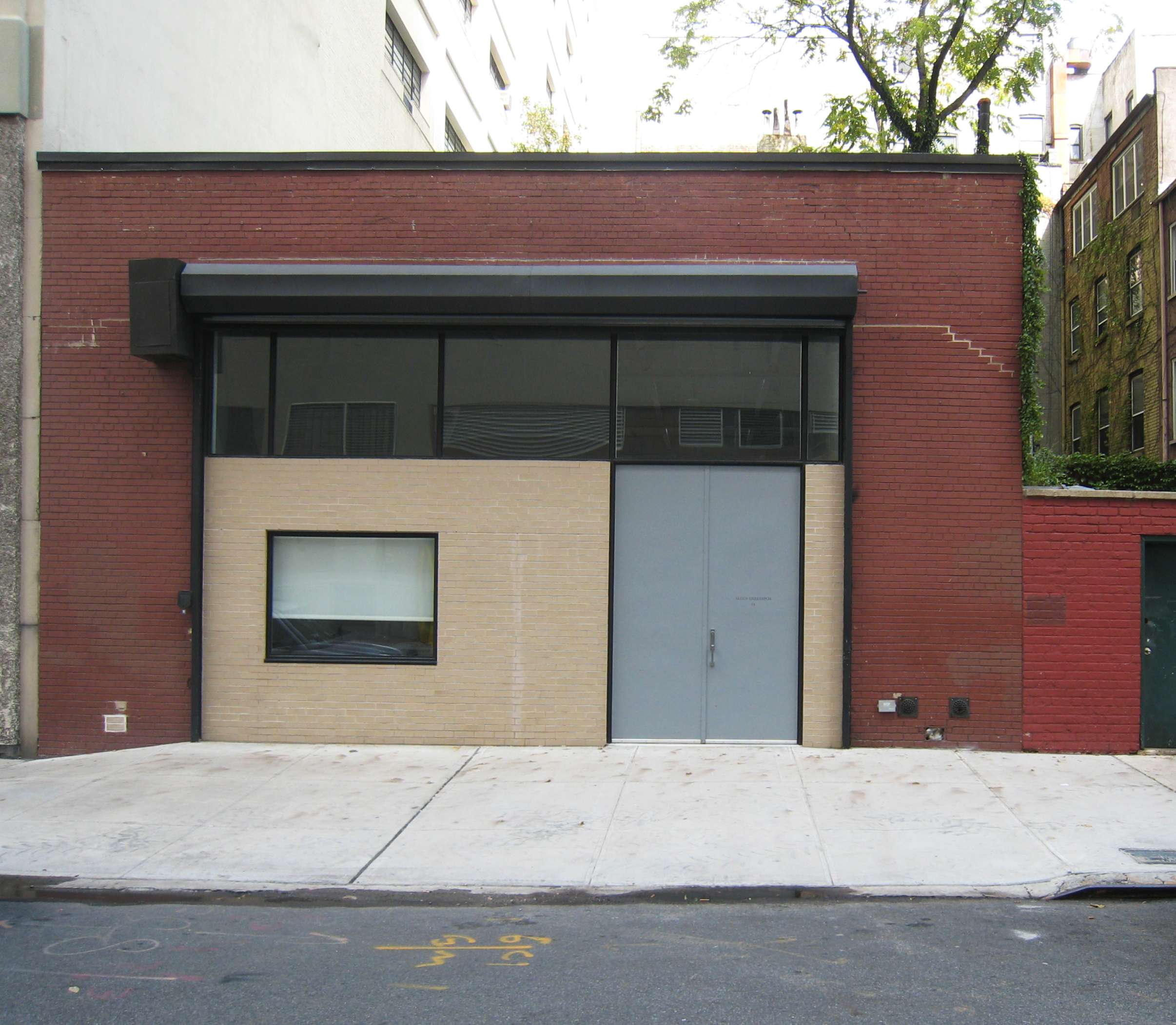
71 Morton Street in New York City

Greenspon was an art gallery located in the West Village of New York City owned by Amy Greenspon.

Founded on a partnership with art dealer Mitchell Algus, the gallery opened in the Fall of 2010 with an exhibition of paintings by Gene Beery and an inaugural musical performance by Emily Sundblad and Pete Drungle. Greenspon presented emerging and mid-career artists with diverse multidisciplinary practices, as well as museum-quality exhibitions.

Greenspon closed soon after and following the 2018 controversy surrounding the cancellation of an exhibition of work by alleged Neo-Nazi Boyd Rice.

== Represented gallery artists ==
- Austė
- Gene Beery
- Bill Bollinger
- Christopher D'Arcangelo
- Ull Hohn
- E’wao Kagoshima
- Adriana Lara
- George Ortman
- Torbjørn Rødland
- Emily Sundblad
- Peter Young

== Exhibitions ==
- the Seam, the Fault, the Flaw, June 28 – August 3, 2018
- Benedicte Gyldenstierne Sehested, You Be You, March 8 - May 5, 2018
- E'wao Kagoshima, February 3 – March 1, 2018
- Adriana Lara, The Future, November 9, 2017 – January 20, 2018
- Mike Zahn, Adapter_Adapted &etc., September 26 – November 4, 2017
- Darren Bader, Forest/Trees, May 16 – July 28, 2017
- Rick Potts, March 4 – April 15, 2017
- Austė, October 22 – December 22, 2016
- Jesse Chapman & Shaun Krupa, Is Panpsychism the Engine of Art?, July 12–August 5, 2016
- Bunny Rogers, Columbine Cafeteria, May 6 – June 25, 2016
- Wills Baker, curator, Detour – Bruno Gironcoli, Eva Hesse, Tobias Pils, March 5 – April 23, 2016
- The Shadow is Taken, October 13 - December 12, 2015
- Torbjørn Rødland, Corpus Dubium, May 9 – June 20, 2015
- Adriana Lara, Underlying Patterns: Tragedy and Comedy Were Improvisations at First, part 2, February 21 – April 11, 2015
- Jason Kraus, Finished Objects, January 28 – February 21, 2015
- E’wao Kagoshima, October 14 – December 6, 2014
- Dave Miko, Ned Vena, Antek Walczak, Collaborative Painting & Text, July 22 – August 8, 2014
- Jesse Chapman, May 10 – July 12, 2014
- CMYK, April 3 – May 3, 2014
- William King, January 4 – February 15, 2014
- Peter Young, November 2 – December 21, 2013
- Torbjørn Rødland, September 10 – October 19, 2013
- Emily Sundblad, The Railbird, June 2 – July 2013
- Adriana Lara & Gene Beery, The Picnic, Friday, May 17 – Saturday, May 25, 2013
- Gene Beery, Early Paintings and Recent Photographs, March 16 – April 27, 2013
- Sebastian Black & Mathew Cerletty, curators, The Stairs, January 26 – March 10, 2013
- Adriana Lara, NY – USA, November 17, 2012 – January 19, 2013
- Peter Young, September 29 – November 12, 2012
- Inside the Banana, July 25 – September 22, 2012
- Bill Bollinger, April 21 – June 9, 2012
- Hans Breder, March 16 – April 14, 2012
- George Ortman, January 14 – March 10, 2012
- Mathew Cerletty, Susan, November 5 – December 23, 2011
- Christopher D’Arcangelo, Homage, October 11 – 29, 2011
- Invitation to the Voyage, September 10 – October 8, 2011
- Emily Sundblad, Que Barbaro, May 9 – June 18, 2011
- Stuart Brisley, March 12 – April 23, 2011
- E’wao Kagoshima, January 19 – March 5, 2011
- Ull Hohn, November 13, 2010 – January 8, 2011
- Gene Beery, September 11 – October 16, 2010

== Sources ==
=== Press ===
- "Frieze Art Fair Opens With Strong Sales." Huffington Post, 2012.
- "Odd Couple: Mitchell Algus and Amy Greenspon Are Showing—and, Yes, Selling—the Unknown, the Emerging, the Dead". The Observer, 2012.
- "Best off-the-beaten-path art galleries", TimeOut New York, 2011.

=== Exhibitions press ===
- Troncone, Alessandra. "Darren Bader: The important thing is to participate" Flash Art, January 2018.
- Wilson, Michael. "Adriana Lara" Artforum, February 2018.
- "Q&A, Adriana Lara, What is the ideal exhibition?" Spike Art Quarterly, Summer, 2017.
- Irvin, Nick, "LIFE: ★★★½." 'Art in America', November 1, 2016.
- Frank, Priscilla. "Artist Rebuilds Columbine's Cafeteria In A Sobering Take On Gun Violence." Huffington Post, June 2016.
- Schwendener, Martha. "Bunny Rogers' 'Columbine Cafeteria.'" The New York Times, June 2016.
- Nunes, Andrew. "A Haunting Exhibition Re-examines Columbine's Collective Trauma." The Creators Project, June 2016.
- Cruikshank-Hagenbuckle, Geoffrey. "Class Plus Sass: Bunny Rogers' 'Columbine Cafeteria.'" Hyperallergic, May 2016.
- Krasinski, Jennifer. "Nothing's Sacred: Two Exhibitions Clown Around With Convention" The Village Voice, 2015.
- Steadman, Ryan. "These are the 7 Must-See Booths at Art Basel Miami 2015." The Observer, 2015.
- Chiaverina, John. "Presidential Campaigns and Old Camp Counselors: At the Opening of the Jewish Museum's 'Unorthodox' Show." ARTnews, 2015.
- Prickett, Sarah Nicole. "Torbjørn Rødland." Artforum, 2015.
- Rosenberg, Karen. "E-wao Kagoshima." The New York Times, 2014.
- Beckenstein, Joyce. "William King." The Brooklyn Rail, 2014.
- Smith, Roberta. "Peter Young: 'Paintings'" The New York Times, 2102.
- Johnson, Ken. "Inside the Banana." The New York Times, 2012.
- Johnson, Ken. "An Afterlife for a Sculptor: Bill Bollinger's Works Resurface in Two Exhibitions." The New York Times, 2012.
- Smith, Roberta. "George Ortman Constructions: 1949–2011." The New York Times, 2012.
- Sanchez, Michael, "'How-To Paint Project' Michael Sanchez on Ull Hohn at Algus Greenspon, New York." Texte zur Kunst, 2011.
- Cotter, Holland. "Anarchism without Adjectives: On the Work of Christopher D'Arcangelo." The New York Times, 2011.
- Rosenberg, Karen. "Invitation to the Voyage." The New York Times, 2011.
- Kley, Elisabeth. "Sunday Painter." artnet.com, 2011.
- Smith, Roberta. "Stuart Brisley." The New York Times, 2011.
