= André Thomkins =

Swiss painter and graphic artist (1930-1985)

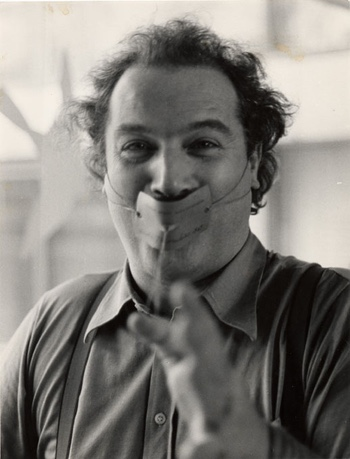
- Thomkins with his work Mundschutz gegen Gummiparagraphen
- Born: 11 August 1930; Lucerne, Switzerland
- Died: 9 November 1985 (aged 55); Berlin, Germany
- Known for: Painting, drawing, graphic art, object art, Lackskins, word art
- Movement: Dadaism, Surrealism, Eat Art
- Spouse: Eva Schnell

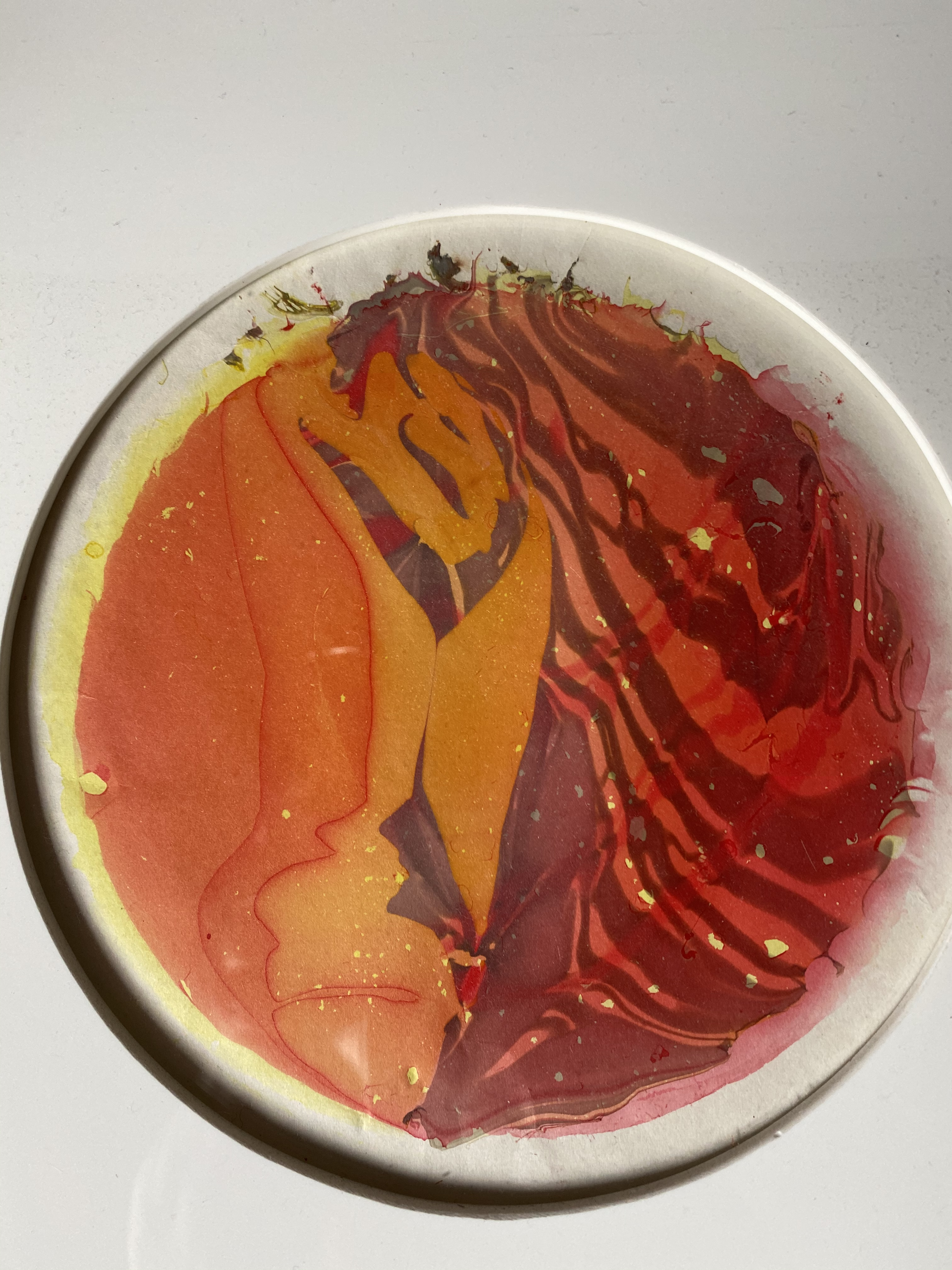
A Lackskin in its production dish

André Thomkins (11 August 1930 – 9 November 1985) was a Swiss painter and graphic artist influenced by Dadaism and Surrealism. He became known for small-format drawings and watercolours, experimental Lackskins, and wordplay using anagrams and palindromes. He taught painting and graphic arts at the Kunstakademie Düsseldorf from 1971 to 1973 and represented Switzerland at the São Paulo Biennial in 1979.

== Biography ==
André Thomkins was born on 11 August 1930 in Lucerne. He attended the Lucerne School of Applied Arts from 1947 to 1949, where he studied under Max von Moos. During this period, he completed an internship as a graphic designer with Unilever in Schiedam, the Netherlands. He continued his education at the Académie de la Grande Chaumière in Paris from 1950 to 1951.

In 1952, Thomkins married the artist and art educator Eva Schnell and moved to Rheydt, Germany. He moved to Essen in 1954. From 1971 to 1973, he taught painting and graphic arts at the Kunstakademie Düsseldorf. He moved to Zurich in 1978, where he established a studio at the Rote Fabrik cultural centre. He taught at the Salzburg Summer Academy in 1982 and held a teaching appointment at the Academy of Fine Arts Munich in 1984.

Thomkins’s eyesight began to deteriorate in the 1970s. He experienced serious heart problems later in the decade and died of heart failure in Berlin on 9 November 1985.

== Work ==
Thomkins worked across painting, drawing, graphic art and object art. Dadaism and Surrealism were important early influences on his work. He was connected with artists working in Fluxus, Eat Art, Concrete poetry and conceptual art. During the 1960s, exchanges within the Cologne–Düsseldorf–Essen art scene also influenced his work.

In the 1950s, he developed the Lackskin technique from a method used in bookbinding. Lacquer was applied to the surface of water, worked into different forms and then transferred onto paper. The resulting images included landscapes, figures and forms recalling microscopic and cosmic worlds.

Thomkins was particularly associated with small-format, intricately worked drawings and watercolours. He gained particular recognition for his drawings during the 1970s, as drawing became increasingly established as an autonomous artistic medium. Language also formed part of Thomkins’s practice. He produced anagrams, palindromes, homophones and associative titles by breaking apart and recombining verbal material.

His object works included the Knopfei ("button egg"), first created in 1957 by attaching a white button to an eggshell. He revisited the object in later versions and developed further works from the same idea. The original no longer survives, while four subsequent versions are known.

Thomkins’s works are held in collections including the Aargauer Kunsthaus, Kunstmuseum Basel, Kunstmuseum Lucerne, Kunstmuseum Solothurn, Kunsthaus Zürich and Kunstmuseum Liechtenstein.

== Exhibitions ==
Thomkins’s first major solo exhibition was held at Kunstmuseum Basel in 1971. In 1979, he represented Switzerland at the São Paulo Biennial. His work was the subject of a retrospective at the Akademie der Künste in Berlin and Kunstmuseum Lucerne in 1989–1990.
