= Barnes v. Glen Theatre, Inc. =

- Supreme Court of the United States

Argued January 8, 1991 Decided June 21, 1991
- Full case name: Michael Barnes, prosecuting attorney of St. Joseph County Indiana, et al. v. Glen Theatre, Inc., et al.
- Citations: 501 U.S. 560 (more) 111 S. Ct. 2456; 115 L. Ed. 2d 504; 1991 U.S. LEXIS 3633; 59 U.S.L.W. 4745; 91 Cal. Daily Op. Service 4731; 91 Daily Journal DAR 7362

Case history
- Prior: Glen Theatre, Inc. v. Pearson, 802 F.2d 287 (7th Cir. 1986); on remand, Glen Theatre, Inc. v. Civil City of South Bend, 695 F. Supp. 414 (N.D. Ind. 1988); reversed, Miller v. Civil City of South Bend, 887 F.2d 826 (7th Cir. 1989); on rehearing en banc, 904 F.2d 1081 (7th Cir. 1990); cert. granted, 498 U.S. 807 (1990).

Holding
- States have the authority and right to regulate and/or ban nudity, as it is in the interests of both the government and society to preserve morality by statute. Nudity is not protected under the First Amendment, nor expressive content.

Court membership
- Chief Justice William Rehnquist Associate Justices Byron White · Thurgood Marshall; Harry Blackmun · John P. Stevens; Sandra Day O'Connor · Antonin Scalia; Anthony Kennedy · David Souter

Case opinions
- Plurality: Rehnquist, joined by O'Connor, Kennedy
- Concurrence: Scalia
- Concurrence: Souter
- Dissent: White, joined by Marshall, Blackmun, Stevens

Laws applied
- U.S. Const. amend. I

Barnes v. Glen Theatre, Inc., 501 U.S. 560 (1991), is a landmark decision of the U.S. Supreme Court concerning the First Amendment and the ability of the government to outlaw certain forms of expressive conduct. It ruled that the state has the constitutional authority to ban public nudity, even as part of expressive conduct such as dancing, because it furthers a substantial government interest in protecting the morality and order of society. This case is perhaps best summarized by a sentence in Justice Souter's concurring opinion, which is often paraphrased as "Nudity itself is not inherently expressive conduct."

== Background ==
Two businesses—the Kitty Kat Lounge, Inc. and Glen Theatre, Inc.—operated adult entertainment establishments in South Bend, Indiana. The Kitty Kat was a club that sold alcoholic beverages in addition to employing female exotic dancers to entertain its patrons. Glen Theatre was primarily in the business of selling adult entertainment materials, such as magazines and videos, and had an enclosed "bookstore" area where customers could insert coins into a machine which would allow them to view live female exotic dancers. Both businesses sought to include fully nude dancers to their entertainment lineup, but were prevented by an Indiana statute regulating "indecent behavior".

Specifically, the statute read that dancers must wear, at a minimum, pasties and G-strings to provide basic coverage of the dancers' bodies. As this law necessarily prevented complete nudity in businesses open to the public, Kitty Kat and Glen Theatre were legally unable to offer nude dancing, prompting them to file suit in the United States District Court for the Northern District of Indiana on First Amendment grounds. The respondents, represented by Patrick Baude, professor at Indiana University School of Law – Bloomington, argued that the prohibition of complete nudity in public places was unconstitutionally overbroad. The District Court granted an injunction, against enforcement of the indecency statute.

The Seventh Circuit Court of Appeals reversed the District Court's decision based on prior suit in the Indiana Supreme Court as well as the United States Supreme Court that denied the respondents' the ability to pursue relief with their current constitutional argument. The case was remanded to District Court, allowing the businesses to argue against the statute as it applied to the proposed dancing rather than claiming constitutional overbreadth.

The District Court, upon remand, declared that the dancing was not constitutionally protected speech, and the businesses appealed to the Seventh Circuit Court of Appeals, which reversed the District Court's ruling. The opinions authored by the judges on the Seventh Circuit's panel accepted the argument that the statute in question unduly infringed on freedom of expression; in this case, the message of "eroticism and sexuality" that the dancers were meant to convey.

The Supreme Court granted certiorari and heard oral arguments on January 8, 1991.

== Opinion of the Court ==
On June 21, 1991, Chief Justice Rehnquist delivered the judgment of the Court, joined by Justices O'Connor and Kennedy. Justices Scalia and Souter authored their own concurring opinions, agreeing with the majority ruling but for different reasons.

The plurality reasoned that, indeed, the type of dancing the respondents sought to include in their businesses was expressive conduct under the First Amendment, albeit "only marginally so". While the plurality ceded this point, it went on to decide how much constitutional protection the conduct warranted, and whether the statute at hand was, in fact, an unacceptable infringement on the freedom of expression.

In determining the type of protection, the plurality turned to the "time, place, or manner" test as implemented in United States v. O'Brien (1968), the four-pronged "O'Brien Test". The plurality found that enacting this sort of legislation was clearly within the constitutional authority of the state, and that the statute furthered a substantial government interest. To understand the legislative intent behind the creation of the statute, the plurality turned to the history of indecency law, noting an expansive history and breadth of adoption for such legislation. Considering available precedent from cases such as Roth v. United States (1957) and Bowers v. Hardwick (1986), the plurality concluded that the statute furthered a government interest in order and morality.

With regards to the third part of the O'Brien Test, the plurality stated that the statute was not related to suppressing expression. The statute did not prohibit nude dancing alone, but rather all nudity in public places. While it may be in some manner "expressive" for a person to appear naked in public, the plurality determined that basically any conduct anyone engages in at any time can be considered "expressive", so merely being expressive is not enough to bring such an argument. To provide support for the logical foundations of this finding, the plurality said,

The requirement that the dancers don pasties and a G-string does not deprive the dance of whatever erotic message it conveys; it simply makes the message slightly less graphic. The perceived evil that Indiana seeks to address is not erotic dancing, but public nudity. The appearance of people of all shapes, sizes and ages in the nude at a beach, for example, would convey little if any erotic message, yet the state still seeks to prevent it. Public nudity is the evil the state seeks to prevent, whether or not it is combined with expressive activity.

As to the final point of the O'Brien test, the plurality contended that the statute was narrowly tailored to achieve the government interest it sought to promote. Indiana's statute was not intended as a clandestine attempt at silencing the potentially expressive conduct of a person dancing in the nude; it was "an end in itself", designed to codify the societal disapproval of nude strangers in public. Even though, as the respondents contended, the patrons in their establishments are all of legal age and all willing to see the prohibited nudity, the fact remains that, for the purposes of the constitutional question at hand, the statute was not needlessly restrictive.

In closing, the plurality reversed the ruling of the Court of Appeals. In effect, this ruling determined that it was not unconstitutional for a state to enact legislation forbidding public nudity outright, particularly if the only requirement for a person to no longer be considered "nude" was wearing some of the most revealing possible clothing.

=== Scalia's concurrence ===
Justice Scalia agreed with the plurality's overall finding, i.e. that the Appeals Court's decision must be reversed. However, he differed from the plurality by arguing that the Indiana statute did not regulate any kind of expression, merely conduct. As such, Justice Scalia believed, it was inappropriate to apply First Amendment scrutiny to the statute in the first place. Justice Scalia took a more formalistic approach to constitutional interpretation than his benchmates by looking at the text of the statute itself and, seeing no reference express or implied to the limitation of any form of expression, deciding that there can be no First Amendment question present at all. Language he used later in his opinion demonstrates the originalist views that characterized Justice Scalia's tenure on the bench.

=== Souter's concurrence ===
Justice Souter also agreed with the plurality opinion's conclusion, but wanted to elaborate further his own reasons for this agreement. In his concurrence, Justice Souter's well-known sentence, "Although such performance dancing is inherently expressive, nudity per se is not", outlines his general purpose. He states that nudity is not inherently expressive because it is merely a state, not an act. He differs from Justice Scalia by agreeing with both the plurality and the dissent that, because the state of nudity can enhance the expressive eroticism of a dance, nude dancing must be afforded some constitutional protection. He agrees in large part with the dissent, but differs by saying that the negative secondary effects (such as prostitution, violence, etc.) that the state may wish to control with such a ban are correlated only to the presence of establishments offering nude dancing, rather than the expression conveyed in the dance. In the closing of his opinion, Justice Souter notes that the establishments are perfectly free to convey their erotic message in any other way short of violating obscenity laws. To this effect, he notes in closing that "a pornographic movie featuring one of respondents ... was playing nearby without any interference from the authorities at the time these cases arose".

== Dissent ==
Justice White authored the dissent, joined by Justices Marshall, Blackmun and Stevens. In noting his disagreement with the other Justices, Justice White argues that the third part of the O'Brien test (requiring that the law be unrelated to the suppression of free expression) is not satisfied. In pursuing legitimate government interests, the statute in place restricts conduct – nudity – that is integral to the expressive nature of the act. Citing Schad v. Borough of Mt. Ephraim (1981), the dissent remarks that the condition of human nakedness in and of itself does not transform otherwise protected speech into unprotected speech. Justice White argues that it is precisely because of the heightened expressive impact that the state chooses to forbid public nudity, because the state desires to control the negative secondary effects such as prostitution and degradation of women. Because nudity is an essential part of the potency of the expression in question, the law unconstitutionally restricts that expression.

== In popular culture ==
- In 2013, the Elevator Repair Service theater company produced Arguendo, a theatrical reenactment of the Supreme Court arguments in this case. Its script follows the audio recordings verbatim, but its choreography incorporates elements of dance. In the play, Bruce Ennis, attorney for the dancers, eventually becomes nude. Created and directed by John Collins, the play was well received in New York and Washington, D.C.

== See also ==
- List of United States Supreme Court cases, volume 501
- List of United States Supreme Court cases
- Lists of United States Supreme Court cases by volume
- List of United States Supreme Court cases by the Rehnquist Court
