= Marcaccio =

Marcaccio is a surname. Notable people with the surname include:

- Fabian Marcaccio (born 1963), Argentine artist
- Gustavo Marcaccio (born 1977), Argentine tennis player and coach
