= Reena Spaulings =

Reena Spaulings is a collective project in the medium of a novel, an artist persona, and an institutional art-gallery active from 2005 to the present in New York City. The Gallery's Co-founders and Co-Directors include Carissa Rodriguez, John Kelsey and Emily Sundblad. The Reena Spaulings novel and persona remains an anonymous collective organization. The Spaulings initiative speaks to ideas of collectivity, anonymity, and artistic categorization through literature and artistic production. Reena Spaulings is a branch of the Bernadette Corporation, also based in New York City.

== Novel ==
=== Process ===
The novel of Reena Spaulings begins as a branch of the Bernadette Corporation under John Kelsey, under the publishing company Semiotext(e) in New York in 2004. To dismantle categorization around the artist's name, the Bernadette Corporation brought together novelists, artists, and anonymous contributors to write a collective novel under the pseudonym of Reena Spaulings. The contributors would write in a collective workshop, each writing one's own section of the novel, which some shared with peers and others keeping the section private. The collective wrote on one's own time, sometimes never showing their work to the rest of the collective. The purpose of the production of a general, collective novel is to challenge notions of labelling, making the product relatable to all members of society. Reena Spaulings is a pseudonym, which artists can challenge the creator's hand, to keep the work a collective production.[2] Reena Spaulings, as a novel, inserts itself into the art historical canon and questions the notions of the artist as a celebrity and as an individual.

=== Summary ===
Preface and Chapter 1

The novel's preface describes the novel's creation by 150 artists, novelists, and unnamed contributors. The narrator likens the creative process to questioning the experience of language and categorization. Reena Spaulings, the protagonist, is introduced through a series of oxymorons for her physical identity, including “young and ugly and beautiful”.

Spaulings enters a museum, watching and observing a series of guards. Spaulings in turn is observed by three characters: Bernadette (a guard watching through a webcam), Rain and Jenny. After Spaulings leaves the museum, Rain criticizes their “homeless” ensemble and Jenny fantasizes about them kissing on a ski lift, calling Spaulings the “most cool girl in the world”.

Chapter 2

Reena leaves the museum and walks through the streets of New York. She describes the atmosphere of the streets she crosses: 79th Street, 66th Street, and so on. She also meditates on magazines and on how our lives resemble those in magazines.

Chapter 3

Reena goes to a party and observes the partiers from a distance. Spaulings mentions that the party goers are raving but are not “black out” drunk yet. As the party progresses, Reena encounters a series of parties and pays close attention to their mouths, as it interests her. Reena starts dancing with a "god" like man, a model in which she describes as beautiful but extremely intoxicated. Spaulings dances with the man and party goer Maris burns Reena with her cigarette for no reason. Maris cools down Reena's burn with an ice cube from her drink, apologizing for her erratic behavior. However, Maris oddly continues to poke fun at Reena's appearance. Reena goes to the bathroom and reconnects with Maris at the bar, in which they do a line of coke together.

Chapter 4

The next day, Reena works at the gallery and provides an overview of the paintings she's guarding, including Manet's Young Lady in 1866. Reena recalls the night before, stitching together the memories she still has interwoven with the descriptions of paintings and the symbolisms around her. Maris visits Reena at work and gives her a business card, proposing to Reena that she be a model is her upcoming photo shoot. Reena ponders, and accepts the invitation.

Chapter 5

Reena goes to the photo shoot where she is exposed multiple times, aggressively dressing and undressing her. The text on the page takes the circular form of breasts, emphasizing the sexualized nature of the magazine industry. After exchanging personal stories and different photo campaigns, Reena confesses that the photo shoot left her in pieces, when in fact she was perfectly happy with being a whole person.

Chapter 6

The narrator describes male models and rappers alike wrestle and exchange stories while watching a tornado from their New York apartment window. All freak out. Reena slept through the whole storm.

Chapter 7

Reena looks in the mirror and examines her body. She questions and analyzes the roles of people within the city, and how the city fuels the bodies of the people in them. Reena ponders and criticizes the beauty industry for the exploitation of the female form for marketing purposes, and soon after thinks about killing Maris. After Reena's tangent, Maris comes over and pays Reena $10,000 for her modelling work. She thinks about blowing her whole paycheck as the city tempts her, but ultimately walks down the street to deposit it at her banks.

Chapter 8

In a restaurant, Reena introduces her lover and he waits tables. She describes his destructive, existential behaviour in detail while recalling his sex habits as they have slept together. Reena describes his hair as grass-like and messy, making her both turned off and attracted to him at the same time. She remembers watching him on the beach, undressing and observing his masculine behaviour.

Chapter 9

The unnamed narrator, male in form this time, meets Reena in a pipe system beneath the city where both met with gossip and rumours. In a drug-like trip, the two characters are flushed into an open field where they become sick and engage in a series of long, drawn-out sexual encounters. The narrator compares Reena to a city, saying that there is no singular idea of the city as the city reproduces itself multiple times based on inter-personal experiences. Reena and the narrator drive through the city, admiring the new lighting systems. The two meet on a bed, and the narrator leaves the room as Reena smashes a glass against the wall.

Chapter 10

Reena goes shopping and recalls small stories about people she encounters, including a woman shooting someone in the leg after a trip to Africa - all people went to a local office Christmas party on the street Reena was walking down. She gives brief descriptions of the stores she encounters: Balenziaga and their contemporary fashion designs, the 99c store and their crowded aisle says with cheap products where one can only pay cash, and liquor store, camels magic trampoline, Juan j'ai experimental music room, and Chinatown. The next day, Reena and Garson take a boat ride in the park, likening the experience to a William turner painting. The couple discuss an incident a couple nights ago where a man touched Reena, but she regards the incident as meaningless. Reena continues with art references - sails as the canvases of Ellsworth Kelly and Helen torr. As the boats speed increases, Garson becomes upset and falls off the boat.

Chapter 11

Maris loses touch with Reena, as she has gained weight and hangs out with tough looking lesbians. Reena, feeling free from the modelling career, moves to Paris where she encounters Maris again with a proposal to do more modelling campaigns. Reena ponders and accepts, going to train with the physical trainer from Cirque du soleil. After an intense work out, Reena leaves and feels defeated. Glancing up, she sees her old underwear ad and gains faith in her career once more. The chapter ends as Reena and Maris fly to shoot the next campaign.

Chapter 12

Reena and Maris go to the movies, watching a series of intense films including a cowboy zombie attack in a cemetery and a woman going on a killer spree in a hospital after distrusting one of her nurses with a breast exam. The films get so intense that Maris becomes part of the cinematic world and has an allergic reaction. Cops drag Maris out of the cinema in which she shakes them off, and walks out of the theatre with Reena by her side.

Chapter 13

Reena runs into Karl Lagerfeld at a club where they talk about his childhood and his perceptions towards fashion. After he leaves, Reena ponders about the material world stating, "reality is not capitalist". Her thoughts are interrupted by a phone call from Maris.

Chapter 14

Maris and Reena attend a Cancer fundraiser to watch a performance by the Strokes, gathering with an audience of celebrities. Reena reflects on her experiences with celebrities past and present, and contemplates whether the celebrity life is for her. The narrator ponders life, stating that death is omnipresent and Maris cries on Reena's shoulder, confessing her fear that she will never have a child. The party ends and Reena showers at her office, reflecting on the events of the party.

Chapter 15

Reena meditates on her body's being, comparing the forms and identities to the flickering and mixing of flames. The narrator describes Reena and her interactions with individuals in the city, including a man looking for the subway station. All individuals share a common connection - an ability to share spaces and take up space within the entity of the city scape.

Chapter 16

The narrator goes off on another tangent, reflecting on body morphisms "the body is just one part of a body" and tangent stories about "Indians".

Chapter 17

Maris heavily edits Reena's photos while the narrator describes aspects of Maris’ life, including childhood memories and internalized thoughts, making the narrator omnipresent. Maris observes her studio and the narrator's original description of Reena comes to life - Maris realizes that everyone around her is a creation of Reena, and Reena extends beyond the boundaries of the physical being. Thus, breaking the narrative structure to encompass multiple experiences and interventions within the text, including paragraphs starting with "for immediate release" touching on themes of death, body, and murder. Reena becomes Vice President of her office institution. Maris shows the interns around and the two friends practice their dance number for a show that night.

Chapter 18

The narrative structure of the book is destroyed, and Reena is ultimately described as "repeatedly destroyed and re-animated". The novel is in complete chaos, jumping from locations in New York, disrupting the text on page, and describing sexual experiences and personal encounters. After the tangent, Reena climbs back to her apartment and collapses. The narrator notes "the words have a particular way of sitting on top of the paper", breaking the concept of a narrative structure. The "black chapter" is exactly that, Reena slips and hits her head, the unconscious spilling out onto the page.

Chapter 19–20

The novel ends with the narrator reflecting on their experiences in major cities around the world, none comparing to their experience in New York. However, the narrator states that they do not miss the city and that the next time they greet the reader, the entity will have blossomed into something bigger and more beautiful.

== Artist Persona ==
=== Artists ===
Many artists have adapted the Reena Spaulings name as a personal pseudonym. Artists who have actively identified with the alter-ego are Emily Sundblad and John Kelsey, two of the founders of the Reena Spaulings Art Gallery in New York. The alter ego allows for artists to adapt the name, therefore allowing to participate in a larger collective force which aims to dismantle the artists hand and association of one's person to the work. Reena Spaulings as an alter-ego also acts as an avatar, allowing for an expulsion of singular identity within the institutionalized art world, creating an anonymous guise for artistic production. The Spaulings pseudonym has been compared to the persona of Gossip Girl, as the character goes through multiple authors and artistic transformations.

=== Artist Works ===
The One and Only (2004) is Reena Spaulings’ first solo exhibition, installed in the Chelsea Gallery in New York. The work depicts a flag occupying a gallery wall, acting as a Territorial marker for the artist. Spaulings installs the flags on a series of steel bars, which are decorated with tar, paint, mirror shards, and embroideries. The One and Only, within the context of the gallery, challenges Colonialist ideologies, speaking to ownership as Spaulings work is installed in another art gallery despite having an existing gallery space for the collective.

Stephen Willat, under the pseudonym of Reena Spaulings, produces The Strange Attractor in 2010 in New York. Willat, based on his observations of individuals and events in New York City, creates a series of videos, diagrams, and maps which display his findings. The process of the work speaks to mathematics, using lines to break larger categories, sometimes defined by pictures or colour blocks, into smaller subsections. The Strange Attractor represents Spaulings’ image of the city as a series of experiences.

The title of The Strange Attractor is derived from a chaotically-formed pattern, inspired by the mathematical and scientific conclusions from Willat's findings.

=== Controversy ===
In 2009 under London's Tate Modern show Pop Life, artists Emily Sundblad and John Kelsey incorporated artist Merlin Carpenter’s quotes without their permission. While the quotes could be found in the gift store and in the Tate’s cafe, the artists nevertheless licensed the quotes for use. The artists, within the institutional corporate boundaries of the Tate, incorporate Carpenter’s quotes under the guise of “Reena Spaulings”. Spaulings, being an alter-ego, is faced with a disruption of artistic integrity due to appropriation. Merlin Carpenter viewed the appropriation as an attack against their work, thus, proving the ego to be a flexible and sometimes controversial guise of artistic integrity regarding commercial institution. Merlin Carpenter, in turn, installed a café within the gallery of the Tate to comment on incorporating their work within the Tate's corporate spaces. Quotes could be read in the café, including "You put my work in the Tate's café, so I'll put the Tate café in your art gallery."

== Gallery ==
Reena Spaulings Fine Arts, named after the novel and pseudonym, was founded by John Kelsey and Emily Sundblad in 2004. The gallery is located at 165 East Broadway in New York City, United States.
