= Emily Sundblad =

American singer-songwriter

Emily Sundblad (born 1977) is an American-based, Swedish-born painter, gallerist, and musician. She co-founded and co-directs Reena Spaulings Fine Art.

== Background and education ==
Sundblad was born in Dalsjöfors, Sweden in 1977. She received her BFA from Parsons the New School for Design in New York in 2003, before attending the Whitney Museum's Independent Study Program, which she completed in the spring of 2006.

== Career ==
=== Reena Spaulings ===
Reena Spaulings is both the pen name of an artist collective, and a gallery in New York City. In 2003, Sundblad and John Kelsey co-founded the gallery Reena Spaulings Fine Art. Subsequently, Reena Spaulings began exhibiting work of her own. Spaulings is portrayed in person by other artists, including co-director John Kelsey, and others from the Bernadette Corporation collective.

Spaulings, as an artist, was included in the Whitney Museum's 2006 Biennial and also took part in the group exhibition "Pop Life" at the Tate Modern.

=== Work under her own name ===
Sundblad, as herself, has also exhibited her paintings internationally and performed at a variety of venues including the Museum of Modern Art in New York. Her work is part of public collections such as the Whitney Museum of Art, New York; among others.

In 2011, Sundblad had her second solo show, ¡Qué Bárbara!, both an exhibition of paintings, and inaugural and closing performances at the Algus Greenspon Gallery in New York. This show also brought about Sundblad's auction debut as she sold the self-portrait she used as her exhibit announcement at Philips de Pury, which sold for $37,500 (with the auction house premium).

== Selected exhibitions ==
- 2013: The Railbird, Algus Greenspon, New York, New York.
- 2013: Endless Bummer II / Still Bummin’, Marlborough Chelsea, New York, New York.
- 2013: Death by Water. Death by Fire (RS), Campoli Presti, Paris, France.
- 2012: Danai Anesiadou, Edith Dekyndt, Emily Sundblad, Galerie VidalCuglietta, Brussels, Belgium.
- 2012: Context Message, Zach Feuer Gallery New York, New York.
- 2011: Lars Bohman Gallery, Stockholm, Sweden.
- 2011: ¡Qué bárbara!, Algus Greenspon, New York, New York.
- 2011: Where Do We Go From Here? Selections from La Colección Jumex (RS), Cincinnati Contemporary Arts Center, Cincinnati, Ohio.
- 2010: If you leave me I will destroy you, House of Gaga, Mexico City, Mexico.
- 2010: Runaway Train, Bonniers Konsthall, Stockholm, Sweden.
- 2010: Don Juan in the Village, curated by Bjarne Melgaard, Lars Bohman Gallery, Stockholm, Sweden.
- 2010: Lonesome Cowgirl, The Green Gallery, Milwaukee, Wisconsin.
- 2010: Re-dressing, Bortolami, New York, New York.
- 2010: (RS), Galerie Daniel Buchholz, Berlin, Germany.
- 2010: Endless Bummer (RS), Blum & Poe, Los Angeles, California.
- 2010: Almeria (RS), Galerie Chantal Crousel, Paris, France.
- 2010: Systems Analysis (RS), West London Projects, London, United Kingdom.
- 2010: Signatures (RS), Sutton Lane, Paris, France.
- 2010: So Be It (RS), Andrew Roth, New York, New York.
- 2010: (RS), Musee D'Art Moderne De La Ville De Paris, Paris, France.
- 2010: Looking Back: The White Columns Annual (RS), White Columns, New York, New York.
- 2010: The Evryali Score (RS), David Zwirner, New York, New York.
- 2010: Pop Life: Art in a Material World (RS), Musée des beaux-arts du Ottawa, Ottawa, Canada.
- 2010: Greater New York (RS), P.S.1, New York, New York.
- 2010: Pop Life - Warhol, Haring, Koons, Hirst, … (RS), Hamburger Kunsthalle, Hamburg, Germany.
- 2010: Sonic Youth etc.: Sensational Fix (RS), CA2M, Centro de Arte Dos de Mayo, Madrid, Spain.
- 2009: Strip/Stripe, Emily Harvey Foundation, New York, New York
- 2009: White Noise, James Cohan Gallery, New York, New York
- 2009: Womanneken Pis or Good Cop/ Bad Cop, Galerie Les filles du calvaire, Brussels, Belgium
- 2009: Marcel Broodthaers & Reena Spaulings (RS), Art|Basel|Miami Beach - Art Positions, Miami, Florida
- 2009: The Belgian Marbles (RS), Sutton Lane, Brussels, Belgium
- 2009: (RS), Malmo Kunsthall, Malmo, Sweden
- 2009: (RS), Kunsthalle Düsseldorf, Düsseldorf, Germany
- 2009: Pop Life (RS), Tate Modern, London, United Kingdom
- 2009: Where Do We Go From Here? Selections from La Colección Jumex (RS), Bass Museum of Art, Miami, Florida

== Selected performances ==
- 2011: Grand Openings Return of the Blogs, Museum of Modern Art New York, July 20–August 1, 2011
- 2010: Grand Openings High Liners (GO), Bonniers Konsthall, Stockholm, Sweden, May 26
- 2010: Street Performance, Centro Historico, Gante y 5 de mayo, March 10
- 2010: Opening Night Performance, GAGA, March 11
- 2010: Gene Beery Opening, Algus Greenspon Gallery, September 28
- 2009: Betteraves Club: Emily Sundblad and Margaret Lee, November 8
- 2009: (GO), Sculpture Center, New York, New York, September 13 – November 30
- 2008: Bumbershoot 2008 (GO), The Henry Art Gallery, Seattle, USA August 30 – September 1
- 2008: Carrier Waves, Nichts IST AUFREGEND. Nichts IST SEXY. Nichts IST NICHT PEINLICH (GO), Mumok Factory & Museum Modern
- 2008: Kunst Stiftung Ludwig Wien, Vienna, Austria, April 12 – April 20
- 2008: (GO), Randolph Cliff, Edinburgh, United Kingdom, April 24 & April 25
- 2008: Songs For Bjarne, Greene Naftali, New York, New York, February
- 2007: I Love Nobody, with Stefan Tcherepnin and Marten Holmberg, Radio Daniele WFMU, Vizcaya, Miami, USA
- 2007: Tvillingarna, Tour- Pussycat Lounge NYC, The Mandrake LA and Pasaguero Mexico City, Mexico, October
- 2007: Montevideo, with Rita Ackermann and Askar Brickman, ZKM, Karlsruhe, Germany, May
- 2007: The Anita Berber Picture Palace Performance, Bellwether Gallery, New York, New York, March
- 2007: Tvillingarna on The Boat Bellman, Stockholm, Sweden, August
- 2007: (GO), Tsunan High School, Echigo-Tsumari Art Triennial 2006, Nigata, Japan, August
- 2007: (GO), Magical Gallery, Tokyo, Japan, August
- 2007: JJJE, with Jay Sanders and Josef Strau, New York, New York, May
- 2007: Tvillingarna at Ugglan, Stockholm, Sweden, May
- 2007: Lee Williams, with Jutta Koether, New York, New York, January
- 2007: Meerettich on Ice, Volksbuhne, Berlin, Germany, December

== Selected curated exhibitions and other projects ==
- 2007: Skymningsfestivalen, a Compilation of Swedish Music for Radio
- 2007: DanieleBologna
- 2006: Akademische Graffiti, with Seth Price
- 2006: Gone With The Wind, A Reena Spaulings Film
- 2004-2005: White Light/White Heat, Reena Spaulings CD Box Set featuring Barbara Sukowa, Rita Ackermann, Emily Speers Mears, Emily Sundblad, Josh Smith and others.
- 2004–present: A Night of Country: An ongoing country music performance project in collaboration with playwright Richard Maxwell.
- 2003–present: Reena Spaulings Fine Art, A New York Gallery
- 2002: Youʼre Just a Summerlove But I'll Remember You When Winter Comes, co-curated With Hanna Liden
- Ongoing: Lee Williams: An artist-persona created with Jutta Koether
