= Charlotte Moth =

British artist (born 1978)

Charlotte Moth (born 1978 in Carshalton) is a British artist who uses principally the mediums of photography, video and sculpture, often using these works to create sculptural or architectural installations. She lives and works in Paris.

== Work ==
In a 2011 interview for ArtForum, Moth stated that she is "very interested in a sculptural relationship to experience. An image can later function as an aid to memory, it becomes a hybrid, and something perhaps better described as an “image-memory". For Moth, photography is a way to analyse her surroundings and understand her experiences. Her photographic practice becomes a way to research subjects and future work.

In 1999, Moth started her ongoing project 'Travelogue', which is a collection of personal photographs which, grouped together, allow a glimpse into the artist's personal universe. This work was inspired by the work of Andrei Cădere, who the artist discovered in 1999. Her fascination with Cadere was engendered by her perception of his work as "an endless conceptual activity that made a separation and rupture from ideas of evolution within artistic practices and by how an underlying structure and repetitive action could become a working methodology." The work was enriched in anticipation of her 2011 exhibition at the Musée départemental d’art contemporain de Rochechouart in France, for which she discovered the archives of Raoul Hausmann, which led her to Ibiza to retrace the footsteps of the Dadaist on the Spanish island during 1933-1936.

In 2015, Moth was invited by Tate Britain to create a work. Inspired by a photograph by Barbara Hepworth's, One Form (Single Form), 1937, she created an archival display to interrogate the way images are choreographed. Using ten vitrines, Moth presented images from the Tate's archives from the years of 1930 to 1960 in order to create 'thought constellations'. Each vitrine treats a different element necessary to stage images of artworks: Image, Light, Book, Nature, Studio, Film, Imagination, Magic and Play.

== Partial solo exhibitions ==
- 2024: dim glows, Galerie Marcelle Alix, Paris
- 2019: COLECCIÓN XVII: CHARLOTTE MOTH, CA2M Madrid, Spain
- 2016: Travelogue, Kunstmuseum Lietchenstein, Vaduz, LI

== Bibliography ==
- Moth, Charlotte, Voyages en territoires partagés/A Journey Through Shared Spaces, 2013, Editions Cercles d'art
- Moth, Charlotte, Bleckede 2009, Rochechouart 2011, 2012, Steinberg Press
- Moth, Charlotte, Charlotte Moth, 2011, Serralves Publications
