= Gatz =

Stage adaptation of The Great Gatsby

- Original language: English
- Written by: F. Scott Fitzgerald (text); adapted by Elevator Repair Service
- Characters: Nick Carraway; Jay Gatsby; Daisy Buchanan; Tom Buchanan; Jordan Baker; Myrtle Wilson; George Wilson
- Subject: The Great Gatsby
- Genre: Literary adaptation
- Setting: A run-down office; the novel's Long Island and New York, 1922

Premiere
- Date: September 2006 (US)
- Place: Walker Art Center, Minneapolis

Gatz is a stage adaptation of F. Scott Fitzgerald's 1925 novel The Great Gatsby by Elevator Repair Service (ERS), a New York theater company. The show was directed by John Collins.

The show consists of the entire text of the novel, read aloud by a company of actors. Its premise is that an office worker pulls a copy of Gatsby out of a drawer and begins reading it aloud. His coworkers gradually join in, and the people and office space transform into the characters and settings of the novel.

== Production history ==
Development on Gatz began in the late 1990s. It was first presented as a work-in-progress at HERE Arts Center as The Great Gatsby, and in 2004 as Gatsby at the Collapsable Hole in Brooklyn. Collins hoped to premiere the piece in New York in January 2005, but the Fitzgerald estate denied ERS the performance rights.

The estate and the holders of novel's commercial theatrical option were concerned about potential confusion between Gatz and a traditional stage adaptation of The Great Gatsby, written by Simon Levy, which they hoped to bring to Broadway. Without the rights, Collins presented it as a "workshop" at The Performing Garage, with no advertising and no admission, as part of the Under the Radar Festival. Festival producer Mark Russell described it as "a secret hit." The estate found out about the production and sent ERS a cease-and-desist e-mail.

In June 2005, the estate granted ERS the rights to perform Gatz outside of Britain and the United States. The estate required permission for U.S. performances, and continued to deny requests for the rights in New York, including for requests to produce it at New York Theatre Workshop and The Public Theater, despite efforts by the Public's artistic director Oskar Eustis to influence the estate.

Gatz began to tour internationally and in the U.S., receiving its American premiere in September 2006 at the Walker Art Center in Minneapolis, building significant buzz. When it played at the Philadelphia Live Arts Festival in 2007, it earned coverage in both The Village Voice and New York Times, where Jason Zinoman wrote, "The legend of GATZ just keeps growing."

The estate finally granted the rights for a New York premiere in September 2010. When it opened off-Broadway at the Public Theater, it sold out a twice-extended run. It was then programmed for the following season, when it was also extended.

After its production at the Public Theater, Gatz was shown in Princeton and Los Angeles between 2011 and 2013; in Abu Dhabi in 2018–19; in Berkeley in 2019–20.

It was remounted for a "final encore" at the Public Theater in November 2024.

== Cast ==
Character	Original actor	"Final Encore" actor
Nick	Scott Shepherd	Scott Shepherd
Jay	Jim Fletcher	Jim Fletcher
Daisy	Tory Vazquez	Tory Vazquez
Tom	Robert Cucuzza	Pete Simpson
Jordan	Susie Sokol	Susie Sokol
Myrtle	Laurena Allan	Laurena Allan
Catherine	Annie McNamara	Annie McNamara
Michaelis	Ben Williams	Ben Williams
Chester	Vin Knight	Vin Knight
Ewing	Ethan Lipton	Mike Iveson
George	Aaron Landsman	Frank Boyd
Lucille	Kate Scelsa	Maggie Hoffman
Henry C. Gatz	Ross Fletcher	Ross Fletcher

== Awards ==
In Australia, the play received a Helpmann nomination for Best Play in 2009. In Boston, the play received an Elliot Norton award for Outstanding Visiting Production and was nominated for Best Ensemble in 2010. In New York City in 2011, the play received a Lucille Lortel Award for Outstanding Alternative Theater Experience; a Drama Desk nomination for Unique Theatrical Experience; and a Drama League nomination for Distinguished Production of a Play. John Collins also received a Lucille Lortel Award for directing the play in 2011. Scott Shepherd received an Obie Award

== Critical reception ==
In 2010, Ben Brantley of the New York Times called the production, "the most remarkable achievement in theater not only of this year but also of this decade."

Writing for Vulture, Scott Brown called it "monumental," saying it forces "a reassessment of our deepest beliefs about ourselves, our culture, our most treasured illusions, literary and otherwise."

Charles McGrath, writing in the New York Times, described the play as "a dramatization of the act of reading" rather than a dramatization of The Great Gatsby.

In The New Yorker, Helen Shaw described the 2024 encore: "The defining nonmusical production of the twenty-tens, it provides an all too relevant observation of heedless decadence, while the performance itself, given its patience and duration, restores to its viewers a deep focus that modern life has made more and more difficult to sustain."
