= New Red Order =

New Red Order (NRO) is a public secret society led by core contributors Jackson Polys, Adam Khalil, and Zack Khalil. They work with networks of informants and accomplices to address and promote Indigenous futures, primarily through art exhibitions, films, and performances. Their name and organization is a contradistinction from the Improved Order of Red Men, an extant whites-only fraternity founded in 1834 that appropriates Indigenous names, rituals, and regalia.

Their work has appeared at Artists Space, Haus der Kulturen der Welt Berlin, Kunstverein in Hamburg, Lincoln Center, Museum of Modern Art, Museum of Contemporary Art Detroit, New York Film Festival, Sundance Film Festival, Toronto Biennial 2019, Walker Arts Center, Whitney Biennial 2019, and other institutions.

== Art ==
=== Never Settle: The Program, 2018-ongoing ===
"Never Settle: The Program" reappropriates the form of broadcast news and self-help tutorials, recruiting actor Jim Fletcher, an “award-winning actor and reformed Native American impersonator” (he once played a Native American in the 2015 play Cry, Trojans!) to encourage viewers to become informants and accomplices. In the film, other non-Native informants extoll the "restorative power" of joining the NRO, participate in a mock share circle, and act out archetypes of white privilege.

=== The Savage Philosophy of Endless Acknowledgement, 2018 ===
"The Savage Philosophy of Endless Acknowledgement" premiered at the Whitney Museum of American Art on June 13, 2018. The performance touched on topics of settler colonial guilt, the origins of American national myths, the invisibility of Native Americans in Euro-American culture, and the historical use of the word "savage." Actors Jim Fletcher and Kate Valk performed settler colonial guilt and acted as proxies for the artists, and performer Suzanne Kite taught the audiences words in the Lakota language. Artist Tali Keren presented on the parallels between U.S. and Israeli land theft, and the coalition building amongst Native Americans and Palestinians people. The performance is believed to be the first time a spoken land acknowledgement has occurred at the museum, and the first time the museum has released a written land acknowledgement, which was published on the performance's event page.

=== The World's UnFair, 2023 ===
The World’s UnFair, 2023

"The World's UnFair" is a public art project supported by Creative Time that ran from September 15-October 22, 2023 in a vacant lot in Long Island City, Queens. An anti-World's Fair, the Indigenous-themed carnival featured a 5-foot tall animatronic beaver and a sixteen-foot tall animatronic tree, signs that say "Never Settle!" and "Give it Back," video testimonials and satirical real estate ads from people who have returned land to Native tribes, and a stage that hosted a "Give it Back Gathering," which also featured people who have relinquished property to Native groups. The temporary use of the lot was donated by its owners, Tavros Capital and Charney Companies, who have plans to develop the lot into a 55-story mixed-use tower.
