= Bass Ackwards =

- Directed by: Linas Phillips
- Written by: Linas Phillips; Davie-Blue; Jim Fletcher
- Produced by: Thomas Woodrow; Mark Duplass; Marian Koltai-Levine
- Starring: Linas Phillips; Davie-Blue; Jim Fletcher
- Cinematography: Sean Porter
- Edited by: Brett Jutkiewicz; Linas Phillips
- Music by: Lori Goldston; Tara Jane O'Neil
- Production company: Furnace Films
- Release date: January 23, 2010 (Sundance)
- Running time: 103 minutes
- Country: United States
- Language: English
- Budget: $35,000

Bass Ackwards is a film written, starring and directed by Linas Phillips and also starring Davie-Blue, Jim Fletcher and Paul Lazar.

The film stars Phillips as a man who embarks on cross-country journey in a modified VW bus after ending a disastrous affair with a married woman.

Bass Ackwards was named an official selection in the 2010 Sundance Film Festival for inclusion in NEXT, a new category that recognized films for their innovative and original work in low-and-no-budget filmmaking, and is part of a wave of films that showcases the diversity of independent cinema. The film was released to video on demand platforms on February 1, 2010.

== Plot ==
Linas finds a forgotten van on a llama farm outside Seattle, and embarks on a road trip east with nothing to lose.

== Cast and crew ==
- Linas Phillips (director, writer, "Linas")
- Mark Duplass (executive producer)
- Thomas Woodrow (producer)
- Sean Porter (cinematographer, co-writer)
- Paul Lazar ("Paul", co-writer)
- Jim Fletcher ("Jim", co-writer)
- Davie-Blue ("Georgia", co-writer)

== Production ==
The film was made on a micro-budget of $35,000. Director Linas Phillips had previously made some documentary films but Bass Ackwards was his first narrative feature. The film was produced by and executive produced by Mark Duplass.

== Reception ==
The film received generally positive reviews.
