= Max von Moos =

Swiss surrealist artist (1903–1979)

- Born: 6 December 1903; Lucerne, Switzerland
- Died: 28 May 1979 (aged 75); Lucerne, Switzerland
- Known for: Painting, drawing
- Movement: Surrealism

Max von Moos (6 December 1903 – 28 May 1979) was a Swiss painter associated with Surrealism. Active from the 1930s onward, he developed an independent surrealist style and became one of the leading representatives of Surrealism in Switzerland. His work was characterised by recurring motifs including masks and mythological imagery.

== Biography ==
Born in Lucerne on 6 December 1903, Max von Moos began drawing and painting while recovering from tuberculosis as a teenager. He studied at the Lucerne School of Applied Arts from 1919 to 1922, where his father, the painter Joseph von Moos, was an important influence on his training. He continued his studies at the State School of Applied Arts in Munich under Johan Thorn Prikker from 1922 to 1923. He subsequently completed training as an antiquarian bookseller in Basel between 1924 and 1928.

Returning to Lucerne, von Moos worked as a designer for an advertising firm before teaching at the Lucerne School of Applied Arts from 1933 to 1969. In 1934, he produced his first surrealist works, and in 1936 he became a founding member of Allianz, an association of modern Swiss painters.

Between 1944 and 1947, von Moos was active in the Swiss Party of Labour before withdrawing from politics. He was awarded the City of Lucerne Art Prize in 1966 and died in Lucerne on 28 May 1979.

== Work ==
During the 1930s, Max von Moos developed his own surrealist visual language in Lucerne. Unlike Swiss contemporaries such as Alberto Giacometti, Meret Oppenheim, Kurt Seligmann and Serge Brignoni, he did not seek direct contact with the Paris Surrealists and largely worked independently. His early paintings were influenced by the work of Paul Klee, and he produced his first surrealist works in 1934.

Masks and mask-like heads became recurring motifs in von Moos's work, alongside references to classical mythology and antiquity. Working in a technique that combined oil and tempera painting, he produced a significant body of surrealist work characterised by social criticism and recurring mythological imagery.

In his later years, von Moos's long-standing eye problems gradually worsened, leading him to abandon oil and tempera painting.

== Exhibitions ==
Von Moos participated in the exhibition Zeitprobleme in der Schweizer Malerei und Plastik at the Kunsthaus Zürich in 1936. The following year, he exhibited at the Kunstmuseum Luzern with Fritz Pauli.

A retrospective of his work was held at the Kunstmuseum Luzern in 1961, which contributed to broader public recognition of his work. Later exhibitions included shows at the Kunstmuseum Winterthur with Otto Tschumi in 1968, the Kunstmuseum Luzern with Ernst Maass in 1973, and the Kunsthaus Zürich in 1979 with Camille Graeser.

The Kunstmuseum Luzern hosted the posthumous retrospective Atlas, Anatomie, Angst from December 2001 to March 2002.

In 2026, Kunsthaus Zug presented Max von Moos: Die Aufschlüsselung, an exhibition exploring recurring forms, motifs and themes in the artist's work and his numerous self-portraits.
