= Merlin Carpenter =

English visual artist

- Born: 1967; Pembury, Kent, England
- Education: Saint Martins School of Art
- Known for: Painting

Merlin Carpenter (born 1967) is an English visual artist. Writing in Frieze, art critic Katie Sonnenborn stated that a recent exhibition "continued his nuanced critique of the condition of contemporary art-making," and that "working within the framework of the gallery, he presented a suite of canvases that cast doubt on current systems of cultural reception and consumption."

== Artistic practice ==
After graduating from Saint Martin's School of Art in 1989, Carpenter has gone on to exhibit in 29 solo shows and 48 group shows between 1989 and 2007. Carpenter's paintings can be seen as deeply ambivalent. His style is heavily influenced by artists like Jackson Pollock and Julian Schnabel. Carpenter promotes in his paintings what he calls the "de-subjectivation of the brush stroke", and with this is his exploration into what he has called "overdetermined imagery" such as fashion photography. In his art Carpenter also marks out the differences and parallels between art and non-artist luxury items.

== The Poster Studio ==
In 1994, Carpenter set up an experimental art space in London named "Poster Studio" with fellow artists Dan Mitchell and Nils Norman, among others. It aimed to produce a critical analysis of the contemporary London art world. The poster studio disbanded in 1996.

== Art writing ==
Carpenter writes articles for the periodical Texte zur Kunst, as well as texts for catalogues and reviews..

== Exhibitions ==
Exhibitions include The Opening, Mitterrand+Sanz/Contemporary Art, Zurich (2007); Relax It's Only a Bad Cosima von Bonin Show, Galerie Bleich-Rossi, Vienna (2007); Sounds of War, Galerie Edward Mitterrand, Geneva (2005) and Ballard in Narnia (with Richard Parry). In 2011, Carpenter made an exhibition of paintings at Simon Lee Gallery, titled Tate Café.

Merlin Carpenter is represented by Reena Spaulings Fine Art, New York and galerie dépendance, Brussels.
