= Kunstmuseum Liechtenstein =

State museum of modern and contemporary art in Vaduz, Liechtenstein

Coordinates: 47°08′22″N 9°31′21″E

Kunstmuseum Liechtenstein Liechtenstein Museum of Fine Arts
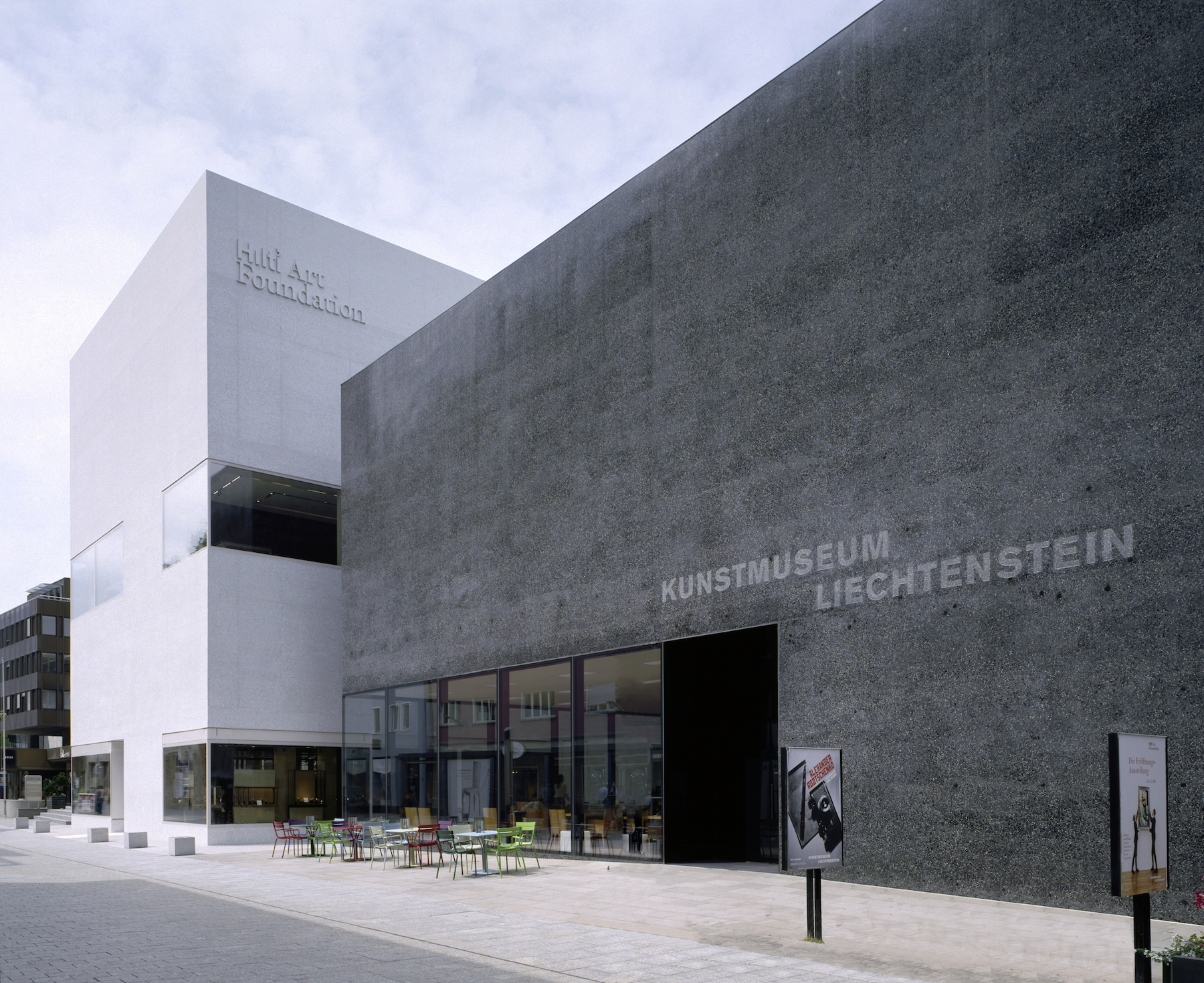
- Established: 12 November 2000; 25 years ago
- Location: Vaduz, Liechtenstein
- Director: Letizia Ragaglia
- Owner: Prince of Liechtenstein Foundation
- Website: https://www.kunstmuseum.li

The Kunstmuseum Liechtenstein (English: Liechtenstein Museum of Fine Arts) is a state art museum in Vaduz, Liechtenstein. The building by the Swiss architects Meinrad Morger, Heinrich Degelo and Christian Kerez was completed in November 2000. The museum is a collection of international modern and contemporary art and the national art collection of the Principality of Liechtenstein. In 2015, the new Hilti Art Foundation exhibition building was added to the Kunstmuseum.

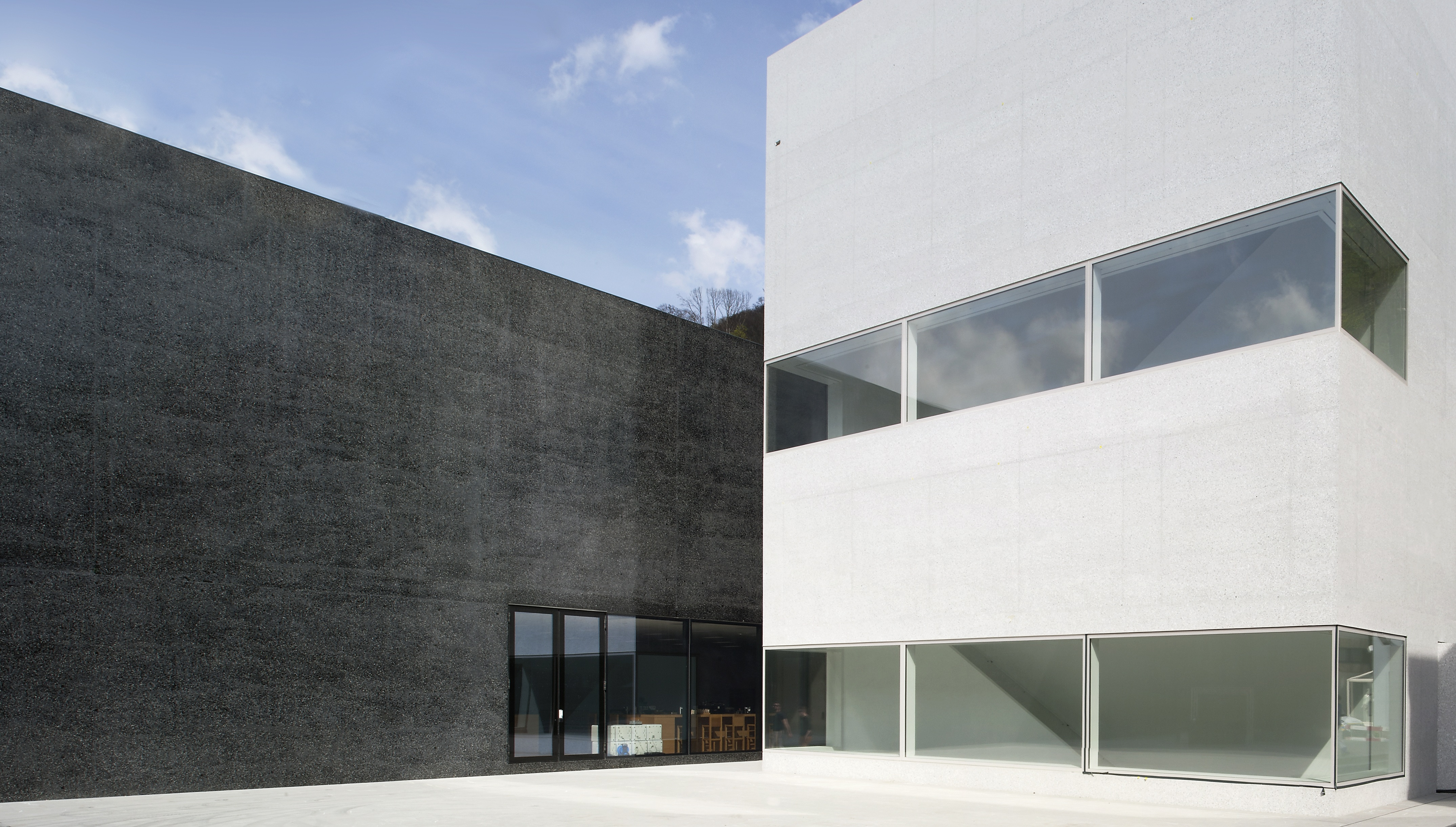
Kunstmuseum Liechtenstein

== History ==
In 1967, the State of Liechtenstein received a gift of ten paintings which resulted in the foundation of the State Art Collection of Liechtenstein the following year. The first curator of the collection was Dr Georg Malin, a Liechtenstein artist, historian and art historian. He soon expanded the collection to include international modern and contemporary art.

The building of the Kunstmuseum Liechtenstein how it presents itself today was realized with the support of a group of private donors. Together with the government of Liechtenstein and the city of Vaduz, they planned and implemented the construction of the museum.

In August 2000, the building was officially donated to the Principality of Liechtenstein as a millennium gift. The government established a public foundation to operate the museum. The Kunstmuseum Liechtenstein was formally opened on 12 November that year.

Dr. Friedemann Malsch was the director of the State Art Collection, later of Kunstmuseum Liechtenstein from 1996 until 2021. Letizia Ragaglia followed him on July 1, 2021. On January 1, 2026, Christiane Meyer-Stoll has taken over as Director of the museum.

== Architecture ==
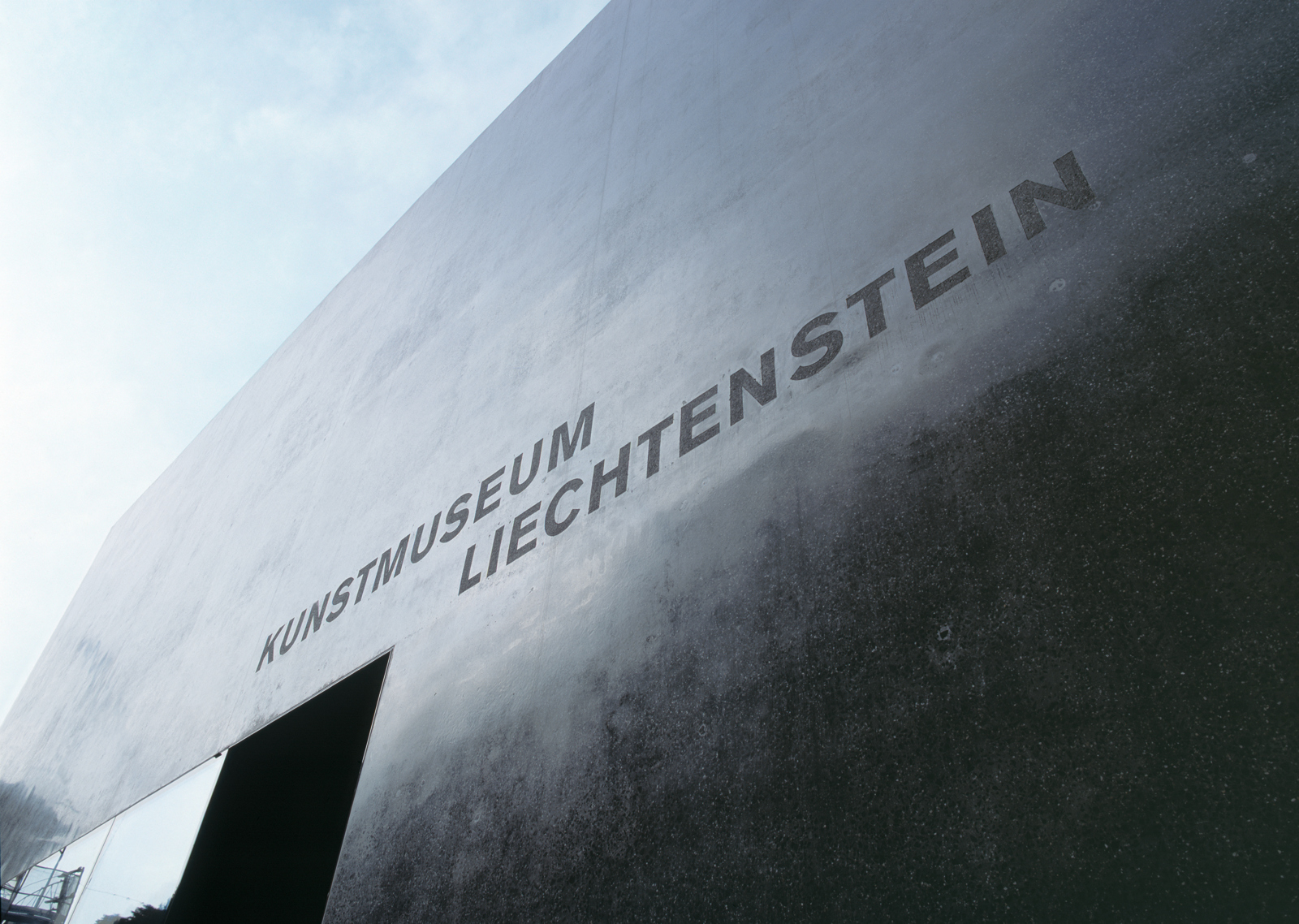
Main Building

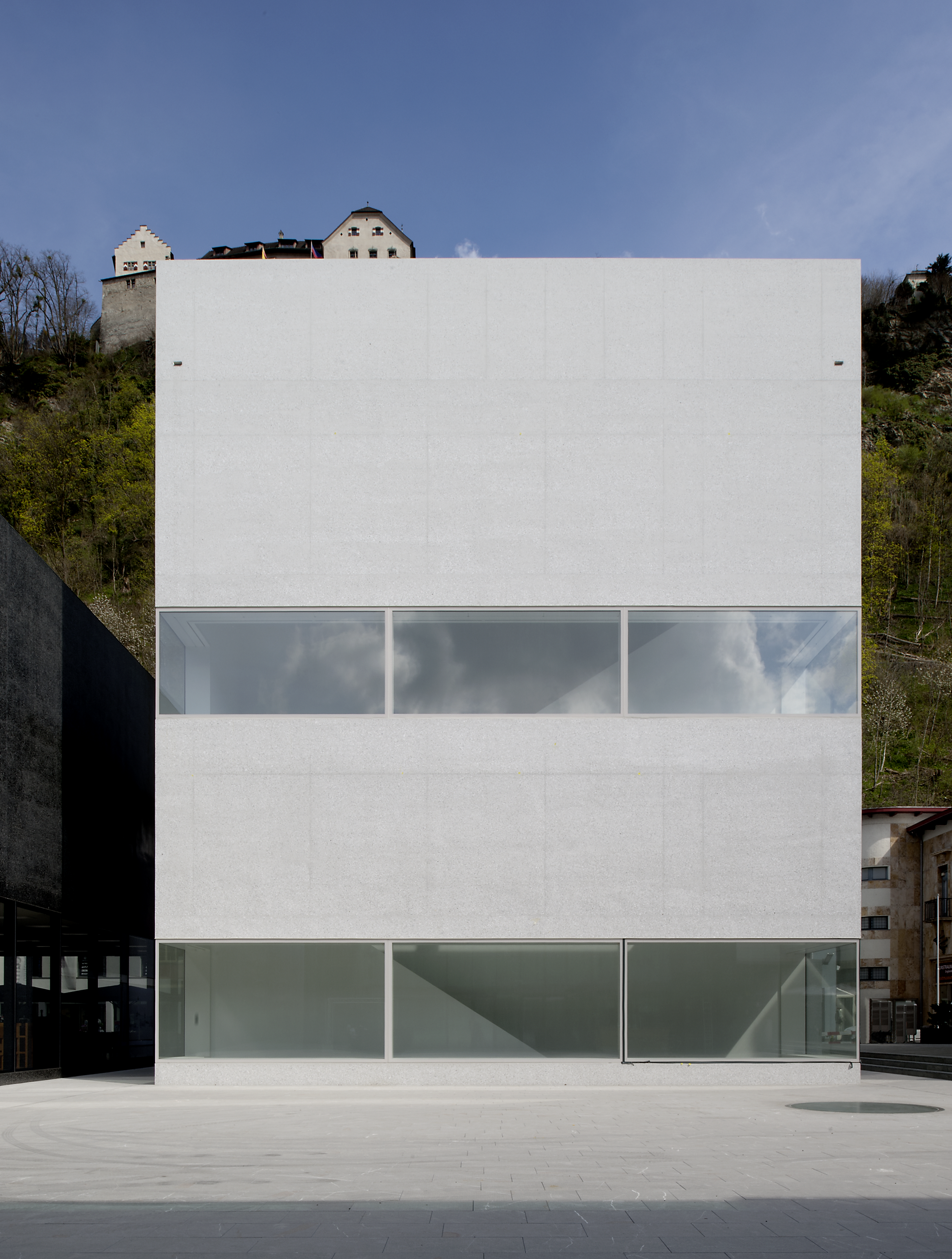
Hilti Art Foundation

The Kunstmuseum Liechtenstein was built by the Swiss architects Meinrad Morger and Heinrich Degelo, along with Christian Kerez. The closed form is a "black box" of tinted concrete and black basalt stone. River pebbles are embedded in the building's exterior.

There are six exhibition rooms arranged around two diametrically opposed staircases. The ground plan enables diagonal views through the whole building.

Hilti Art Foundation

With the new exhibition spaces, the Hilti Art Foundation continues and intensifies its long-standing collaboration with the Kunstmuseum Liechtenstein. A visible expression of this connection is the design of the new building in the form of a cube. Conceived by the Basel-based company Morger Partner Architekten, the building forms a unified presence with the Kunstmuseum Liechtenstein directly adjacent. The cubic form, as well as the construction and material of the facade, reflect the common bonds of the two institutions under the aegis of a single museum. As a further sign of togetherness, access to the new exhibition spaces is provided through a shared entrance with Kunstmuseum Liechtenstein.

== Collection ==
The collection represents the larger part of the state's art collection and as such is an important and integral part of the public image of Liechtenstein.

The collection of international modern and contemporary art covers the period from the 19th century to the present; the acquisition policy focuses on 20th and 21st-century works, especially sculptures and installations. Special attention has been given to the selection of independent artistic positions.

The acquisition policy intentionally avoids limitations of geography, style, epoch or specific media; instead, it pursues themes of particular significance in modern and contemporary art. Abstract and minimal art, conceptual art and Arte Povera encounter anthropological approaches of the kind found in symbolism, futurism and surrealism, or in the individual mythologies of Joseph Beuys and in other aspects of Arte Povera.

In 2007, the Kunstmuseum Liechtenstein together with the Kunstmuseum St. Gallen and the Museum of Modern Art, Frankfurt acquired the collection of Cologne-based gallerist Rolf Ricke that includes works by Richard Artschwager, Bill Bollinger, Donald Judd, Gary Kuehn, Fabian Marcaccio, Steven Parrino, David Reed, Richard Serra, Keith Sonnier or Jessica Stockholder. Although the collection is divided between three, in terms of possessive right, it remains intact as the partner museums will have equal access to the complete stocks.

== Exhibitions ==
Past exhibitions include Gary Kuehn, Otto Freundlich, Gottfried Honegger, Leiko Ikemura, Rita McBride, Paul Klee, Jochen Gerz, André Thomkins, František Kupka, Andy Warhol, Fabian Marcaccio, Alighiero Boetti, Fred Sandback, Georg Malin, Sean Scully, Matts Leiderstam, Ferdinand Nigg, Monika Sosnowska, Joseph Beuys, Thomas Schütte, Kazimir Malevich, Martin Frommelt, Matti Braun, Christian Boltanski, Gotthard Graubner, Bill Bollinger, Bojan Šarčević, Günter Fruhtrunk, Kimsooja, Ilja Taschaschnik, Latifa Echakhch, Saâdan Afif, Alexander Rodtschenko, Charlotte Moth, Bertrand Lavier or Anna Kolodzieska.

Since the May 2015 opening of its exhibition building adjoining Kunstmuseum Liechtenstein, the Hilti Art Foundation has presented a changing selection of paintings, sculptures and objects from the holdings in its art collection, covering the period from classical modernism to the present. The current selection includes works by Gauguin, Picasso, Léger, Beckmann, Kirchner, Klee, Kandinsky, Dubuffet, Giacometti, Graubner, Knoebel, Morellet, Sonnier, Scully and others. The exhibition is organized into themes and chronological eras corresponding to the building's division into three levels.

== Extension – Hilti Art Foundation ==
Since May 2015, Kunstmuseum Liechtenstein is expanded by the Hilti Art Foundation's new exhibition building.

== See also ==
- List of national galleries
