= The Select (The Sun Also Rises) =

Play

- 2011 NYTW Off-Broadway promotional poster
- Original language: English
- Written by: Elevator Repair Service
- Subject: Romance & Adventure
- Genre: Drama
- Setting: 1920s France & Spain

Premiere
- Place: 2010 Edinburgh Festival Fringe

The Select (The Sun Also Rises) is a stage adaptation of Ernest Hemingway's 1926 novel The Sun Also Rises by Elevator Repair Service theater ensemble. It has been performed in several venues. It premiered at the 2010 Edinburgh Festival Fringe. The Off-Broadway production, which ran from September 11 – October 23, 2011 at the New York Theatre Workshop (NYTW), earned awards for its sound design. The show directed by John Collins and produced by Ariana Smart Truman and Lindsay Hockaday received the Lucille Lortel Award for being outstanding.

== Details ==
It was performed at the Royal Lyceum Theatre in Edinburgh in 2010, the Arts Bank in Philadelphia in 2010, at ArtsEmerson in Boston in 2011, the NYTW in New York City in 2011, the 2012 Dublin Theatre Festival, and McCarter Theatre in Princeton in 2012. The work, named for a bar at which the protagonists gather, features a bullfight on stage. The show is faithful to the original ill-fated romantic triangle between Americans Robert Cohn and Jake Barnes and Brit Lady Brett Ashley that was set in Spain and France. This work is like much of the Elevator Repair Service's other performances in which "the cast recites parts of the book verbatim while also drolly enacting dance, drama and mayhem onstage". The show was notable for its unusual cacophony, which is controlled by the performers rather than sound technicians.

The Off-Broadway production began previews on August 19, 2011 and officially opened on September 11. It was scheduled to run until October 9 and was extended until October 23.

A production at Shakespeare Theatre Company in Washington, D.C., opened on February 18, 2017 and ran until April 2.

== Cast ==
- Frank Boyd as Harvey Stone, Harris, others
- Mike Iveson as Jake Barnes
- Vin Knight as Count Mippipopolous, Braddocks, Montoya, others
- Kate Scelsa as Frances, others
- Kaneza Schaal as Georgette, the concierge, the drummer, Belmonte, others
- Pete Simpson as Mike Campbell, others
- Susie Sokol as Pedro Romero, others
- Lucy Taylor as Brett Ashley
- Matt Tierney as Robert Cohn
- Ben Williams as Bill Gorton, Zizi, others

== Awards ==
Matt Tierney and Ben Williams won the 2012 Obie Award for Sound Design and the 2012 Lucille Lortel Award for Outstanding Sound Design. David Zinn was nominated for the Lortel Award in Outstanding Scenic Design.

== Critical commentary ==
Lyn Gardner of The Guardian, while noting its length, praised the performance in Edinburgh describing it as "theatrical open-heart surgery on Ernest Hemingway's first major success" done with "surgical expertise and a droll, playful humour" that is too long at nearly four hours. Erik Piepenburg of The New York Times says that although words are important to this performance, so are sounds. When Ben Brantley of The New York Times saw the 2010 Philadelphia performance, he praised the presentation of the alcoholic consumption and continuous party atmosphere saying "This alcoholic element is what has been conjured so persuasively" and the show is "a wood-paneled temple to drinks past, present and future". However, upon seeing the 2011 Off-Broadway performance, Brantley says "...it never entirely wraps its mind around the style and essence of the book that inspired it". The Village Voice's Helen Shaw described the show as "a gleefully drunken, offhandedly contemporary animation of Hemingway's hardboiled classic". Adam Hetrick of Playbill described the performance as "a dramatic explosion of Hemingway's 1926 novel, that melds text, theatrical avant garde and an evocative soundscape".
