= Bill Bollinger =

American artist (1939–1988)

William W. Bollinger
- Exhibition view 'Bill Bollinger. The Retrospective', at the Kunstmuseum Liechtenstein, Vaduz
- Born: 15 July 1939; Brooklyn, New York
- Died: 26 May 1988 (aged 48)
- Education: Art Students League of New York, Brown University
- Known for: Sculpture, Drawing
- Movement: Minimalism

Bill Bollinger (July 15, 1939 – May 27, 1988) was an American artist. In the late 1960s, he was one of the foremost sculptors of his time, routinely mentioned in the same breath as the likes of Bruce Nauman, Robert Smithson, Eva Hesse and Richard Serra. His work can be categorized as minimalist or postminimalist art.

Recently, Bollinger's work has received renewed attention, with a retrospective hosted at SculptureCenter in New York in 2012 entitled Bill Bollinger: The Retrospective.

Bollinger is currently represented by Greenspon in New York.

== Life ==
From 1957 to 1961, Bill Bollinger studied aeronautical engineering at Brown University in Providence, Rhode Island. In 1961, the year he identifies as the beginning of his artistic career, Bollinger moved to New York City where he briefly studied painting at the Art Students League. From 1969 to 1971, he took a teaching position at the School of Visual Arts, New York. In 1976, he served as an instructor at the Minneapolis College of Art and Design. Around 1979–80, he taught at the University of Rhode Island.

== Work ==
In his works, Bill Bollinger made frequent use of standard industrially fabricated products. The artist explained his approach: “I only do what it is necessary to do. There is no reason to use color, to polish, to bend, to weld, if it is not necessary to do so.”

For the Channel Pieces from 1965 to 1968, he joined extruded aluminum profiles to create works with additive and rhythmic properties. These were followed by the Pipe Pieces made from aluminum pipes held together with fittings and the Rope Pieces, consisting of a rope stretched between two terminal points within the exhibition space. In the Cyclone Fence Pieces, Chain-Link Fence Pieces, Wire Pieces and Screen Pieces from 1968 and 1969, Bollinger utilized commercially available wire mesh and netting. They allowed him to lend expression to the painterly and graphic questions of space and the fundamental laws of physics. Four works from 1968 – a Rope Piece, a Wire Piece and two Pipe Pieces – were included in the legendary 1969 exhibition “Live in Your Head: When Attitudes Become Form” curated by Harald Szeemann at Kunsthalle Bern.

In the Graphite Pieces (1969–1970), Bollinger spread graphite dust over the floor, leaving clear traces of the process of creation while incorporating the sense of openness and expandability that was so important to Bollinger. The ready-made character of Bollinger's works is especially apparent in the Droplights (hanging lamps) from 1969. Later works with floating tree trunks and barrels show Bollinger's affinity for water. In 1973, he began working in cast iron.

== Awards ==
- 1968: National Council on the Arts Grant

== Bibliography ==
- Meyer-Stoll, Christiane (ed.), Bill Bollinger: Water is Life and Like Art It Finds Its Own Level. Vaduz: Kunstmuseum Liechtenstein, 2011, catalogue for the exhibition at Kunstmuseum Liechtenstein, April 2 – May 8, 2011, at ZKM / Zentrum für Kunst und Medientechnologie Karlsruhe May 28 – September 25, 2011, Fruitmarket Gallery, Edinburgh, October 29, 2011 – January 8, 2012.
