= George Earl Ortman =

American painter, printmaker, constructionist and sculptor (1926-2015)

- Born: October 17, 1926; U.S.
- Died: December 16, 2015 (aged 89); U.S.
- Style: Neo-Dada, pop art, minimalism, hard-edge painting
- Movement: Painter, printmaker, conscructionist, sculptor
- Spouses: Julie Bovasso, Constance Whidden, Lynn Braswell

George Earl Ortman (October 17, 1926 – December 16, 2015) was an American painter, printmaker, constructionist and sculptor. His work has been referred to as Neo-Dada, pop art, minimalism and hard-edge painting. His constructions, built with a variety of materials and objects, deal with the exploration of visual language derived from geometry—geometry as symbol and sign.

Ortman was represented by Greenspon in New York.

== Background and education ==
Ortman was born in Oakland, California. His father was an electrician who learned his trade from his father, George Earl Ortman, who worked with Thomas Edison in Chicago in the late nineteenth century. His mother, born Anna Katherine Noll, was born in Frankfurt am Main, Germany. She came to the United States in 1914 to work as governess for the mayor of San Rafael, California. After completing high school, Ortman enlisted in the United States Naval Air Corps V-5 program. Upon his discharge in 1946, he studied at the California College of Arts and Crafts (now the California College of the Arts) (1947–1948). After several years, he moved to New York City, where he studied at the Atelier 17, a printmaking school founded by the English painter and printmaker Stanley William Hayter (1949). Later that year, he left for Paris where he studied at the Atelier André Lhote (1949–50). Upon his return to New York City he studied at the Hans Hofmann School of Fine Arts (1950–51).

== Career ==
Ortman first exhibited in the Salon de Mai in Paris in 1950. Upon his return to New York City he was invited to join the Artist' Club, a meeting place for artists whose members included early proponents of Action painting and Color Field painting. In 1953 he had his first solo exhibition at the Tanager Gallery, one of the Tenth Street a co-operative galleries that together formed an avant-garde alternative to the more conservative 57th Street and Madison Avenue galleries. In 1954, he and actress Julie Bovasso founded the Tempo Playhouse to perform contemporary European playwrights, including the first American showings of Jean Genet, Eugène Ionesco, and Michel de Ghelderode.

In 1954 and 1960, he showed simplified geometric constructions at the Stable Gallery. This work was viewed by Donald Judd as a precursor to Minimalism. In July 1960 he married the artist, Conni Whidden. In 1965 Ortman was appointed artist in residence at Princeton University, and was honored with a retrospective at the Walker Art Center in Minneapolis.

In 1970 Ortman assumed the position of Head of the Painting Department at Cranbrook Academy of Art in Bloomfield Hills. His wife of 30 years died in 1991. The following year Ortman left Cranbrook. Returning to the East Coast, he moved to Castine, Maine.

In a catalogue essay for an exhibition of Ortman's work at Princeton University in 1967, American poet, Stanley Kunitz, wrote: "Ortman's work could not have been produced except for an artist of bold analytical intelligence, with a sense of the usable past and an inexhaustible curiosity about the way the thing is made, the "sacred mystery."

In Arts Yearbook 7 (1964), Donald Judd wrote: "Some of George Ortman's reliefs are three-dimensional enough to be objects. They seem to be games or models for some activity and suggest chance … They suggest probability theory. They are one of the few instances of completely unnaturalist art. They are concerned with a new area of experience, one which is relevant philosophically as well as emotionally."

Ortman died on December 16, 2015, at the age of 89.

== Awards ==
- 2014 : Indiana University Thomas Hart Benton Medallion
- 2008 : Adolph and Esther Gottlieb Foundation Grant
- 2003 : Lee Krasner Award for Lifetime Achievement (Pollock-Krasner Foundation)
- 1965 : Guggenheim Fellowship

== Selected museum collections ==
- The Museum of Modern Art, New York City, NY
- The Solomon R. Guggenheim Museum, New York City, NY
- The Whitney Museum of American Art, New York City, NY
- The National Academy of Design, New York City, NY
- The Hirshhorn Museum and Sculpture Garden, Washington, DC
- The National Gallery of Art, Washington, DC
- The Smithsonian American Art Museum, Washington, DC
- The New Jersey State Museum, Trenton, NJ
- The Newark Museum, Newark, NJ
- The Oakland Museum of California, Oakland, CA
- The Los Angeles County Museum of Art, Los Angeles, CA
- The Minneapolis Institute of Art, Minneapolis, MN
- The Walker Art Center, Minneapolis, MN
- The Cleveland Museum of Art, Cleveland, OH
- The DeCordova Museum and Sculpture Park, Lincoln, MA
- The Detroit Institute of Art, Detroit, MI
- The Indianapolis Museum of Art, Indianapolis, IN
- The Portland Museum of Art, Portland, ME

== Solo exhibitions ==
- 2013 : 39 Great Jones, Galerie Eva Presenhuber, 39 Great Jones Street Storefront, New York, NY
- 2012 : Algus Greenspon, New York, NY
- 2006 : Mitchell Algus Gallery, New York, NY
- 2002 : Mitchell Algus Gallery, New York, NY
- 1981 : Cranbrook Academy of Art Museum, Bloomfield, MI
- 1976 : Gertrude Kasle Gallery, Detroit, MI
- 1972 : Gimpel Weitzenhoffer Gallery, New York, NY
- 1971 : Indianapolis Museum of Art, Indianapolis, IN
- 1970 : Cranbrook Academy of Art Museum, Bloomfield, MI
- 1970 : Reed College, Portland, OR
- 1967 : Renaissance Society, University of Chicago, Chicago, IL
- 1967 : Howard Wise, New York, NY
- 1967 : Princeton University Museum of Art, Princeton, NJ
- 1966 : Dallas Museum of Art, Dallas, TX
- 1966 : Akron Art Institute, Akron, OH
- 1966 : Portland Museum of Art, Portland, ME
- 1966 : Milwaukee Art Center, Milwaukee, WI
- 1966 : David Stuart Gallery, Los Angeles, CA
- 1965 : Walker Art Center, Minneapolis, MN
- 1964 : Cincinnati Museum of Art, Cincinnati, OH
- 1964 : Howard Wise, New York, NY
- 1964 : David Mirvish Gallery, Toronto, CA
- 1962 : Howard Wise, New York, NY
- 1961 : Swetzoff Gallery, Boston, MA
- 1960 : Stable Gallery, Boston, MA
- 1957 : Stable Gallery, New York, NY
- 1955 : Wittenborn Gallery, New York, NY
- 1953 : Tanager Gallery, New York, NY

== Group exhibitions ==
- 2013 : 39 Great Jones, Galerie Eva Presenhuber, Zurich, CH
- 1984 : New Acquisitions, Cleveland Museum of Art, Cleveland, OH
- 1981 : New Acquisitions, Guggenheim Museum, New York, NY
- 1978 : Tenth Street Years, New York, NY
- 1977 : The Spirit of Art, Indianapolis Museum of Art, Indianapolis, IN
- 1975 : Rainments of the Lord, Art Institute of Chicago, Chicago, IL
- 1972 : Whitney Biennial, Whitney Museum of Art, New York, NY
- 1971 : Opening Exhibition, Walker Art Center, Minneapolis, MN
- 1970 : Opening Exhibition, Indianapolis Museum of Art, Indianapolis, IN
- 1969 : Carnegie International, Pittsburgh, PA
- 1968 : Icon-Idea, Rivington Arms, Lafayette College circulated by Smithsonian Institution, Easton, PA
- 1967 : Carnegie International, Pittsburgh, PA
- 1967 : Best of Season, Lany Aldrich Museum, Ridgefield, CT
- 1967 : Tamarind Print Exhibition, Museum of Modern Art, New York, NY
- 1965 : Tokyo Biennial, Tokyo, Japan
- 1965 : A Decade of American Drawings, Whitney Museum, New York, NY
- 1965 : Painting Annual, Whitney Museum, New York, NY
- 1964 : Sculpture Annual, Whitney Museum, New York, NY
- 1964 : American Painting, Stedelijk Museum, Amsterdam, NL
- 1964 : History of Geometric Painting in America, Whitney Museum, New York, NY
- 1964 : Carnegie International, Pittsburgh, PA
- 1963 : Toward a New Abstraction, Jewish Museum, New York, NY
- 1963 : The Formalists, Gallery of Modern Art, Washington D.C.
- 1963 : 60 Years of American Painting, Whitney Museum, New York, NY
- 1962 : Annual, Chicago Art Institute, Chicago, IL
- 1961 : American Sculpture, Claude Bernard Gallery, Paris, FR
- 1960 : Artists Under 35, Whitney Museum, New York, NY
- 1960 : New Acquisitions, Museum of Modern Art, New York, NY
- 1959 : New Forms, New Media, Martha Jackson Gallery, New York, NY
- 1958 : Stable Annual, Stable Gallery, New York, NY
- 1950 : Salon de Mai, Paris, FR

== Press ==
- Morgan, Robert C., "George Ortman." The Brooklyn Rail, April 4, 2012.
- Smith, Roberta, "George Ortman: Constructions: 1949 - 2011." The New York Times, February 23, 2012.
- Long, Jim, "George Ortman." The Brooklyn Rail, December 2006.
- Smith, Roberta, "George Ortman." The New York Times, December 8, 2006.
- Glueck, Grace, "Art In Review; George Ortman -- 'The Models, an Imitation'." The New York Times, June 22, 2001.
- Kunitz, Stanley, "George Ortman." The Art Museum Princeton University Press, November 1967.
- O'Doherty, Brian, "Art: Constructions to Control Conditioned Reflexes." The New York Times, 1967.
- Judd, Donald, "Specific Objects." Arts Yearbook, 1965.
- Gruen, John, "Enigmas on Canvas." New York Herald Tribune, May 10, 1964.
- O'Doherty, Brian, "Ortman." The New York Times, May 3, 1964.
- "Second-Generation Abstraction." Time, May 24, 1963.
- Burckhardt, Edith, "Exhibition at Stable." ArtNews, January 1960.
- Ashton, Dore, "Art: On the Younger Side." The New York Times, January 6, 1960.
