= John Collins (theatre director) =

American director (born 1969)

- Born: October 17, 1969 (age 56); Chapel Hill, North Carolina, U.S.
- Occupation(s): Theatre director, scenic designer

John Collins (born October 17, 1969, in Chapel Hill, North Carolina) is an American experimental theatre director and designer. He is the founder and artistic director of Elevator Repair Service (ERS) and has directed or co-directed all of its productions since 1991. Most notable among his work with ERS is Gatz, a verbatim performance of the text of The Great Gatsby.

Between 1991 and 2006, Collins worked as a sound and lighting designer, primarily designing sound for The Wooster Group from 1993 to 2006.

== Early life and education ==
Collins was born in Chapel Hill, North Carolina and grew up in Vidalia, Georgia. Collins attended Duke University in 1987–88 before transferring to Yale in 1989. He graduated cum laude with a combined degree in English and Theater Studies from Yale University in 1991. At Yale, he met future long-term collaborators and ERS co-founders including novelist James Hannaham, playwright/performer Rinne Groff, writer/producer Steve Bodow, choreographer Katherine Profeta, and performers Susie Sokol and Leo Marks.

== Early work ==
Collins, along with Hannaham, Groff, Profeta, Colleen Werthmann, and Bradley Glens, formed Elevator Repair Service in the fall of 1991. Shortly after, they were joined by Steve Bodow, who served as co-Artistic Director until 2002 before joining the writing staff of The Daily Show. The ensemble's first production was a version of Tristan Tzara's The First Celestial Adventure of Mr. Antipyrine, Fire Extinguisher.

Collins's early work with ERS was presented at downtown New York City venues such as Nada, Here Arts Center, The Ontological at St. Mark's Church, and Performance Space 122. The company's first original piece to tour Europe was Cab Legs (directed by Collins with Steve Bodow).

== Design work ==
Upon arriving in New York after graduating from Yale, Collins worked as a sound designer for Target Margin Theater. Collins also worked as sound technician and operator on Richard Foreman’s productions The Mind King, and Samuel’s Major Problems.

== Personal life ==
Collins has lived in New York City since 1991. In 2002, he earned a private pilot's certificate and is rated to fly single-engine airplanes. In 2018, he married the journalist Lizzie O'Leary. They live in Brooklyn.

== Awards ==
- 2010 Guggenheim Fellowship
- 2010 Elliot Norton Award for Outstanding Director
- 2014 Doris Duke Performing Artist Award
- 2011 United States Artists Donnelley Fellow
