= Jackson Polys =

Native American Artist

Jackson Polys (born 1976 in Ketchikan, Alaska) is a Tlingit Native visual artist and filmmaker whose work is based between Alaska and New York. His work examines the constraints and potential in the desire for Indigenous advancement, while challenging existing gazes onto traditional Native culture. Polys is well known for his films, institutional critique, and carved sculptures incorporating materials such as abalone, glass, liquids, resins, silicone, as well as the ready-made.

== Early life and education ==
Polys was born in the Tlingit territory located in the Pacific Northwest of the United States near the border of British Canada. At the early age of three, Polys began carving with his father Nathan Jackson. He was adopted into the Dakl’aweidí Clan of the Jilkáat Kwáan and worked as a visual artist with the names of Stephen Paul Jackson and Stron Softi. During this time Polys began to carve large-scale totemic sculptures.

Polys received his BA in Art History and Visual Arts from Columbia University (2013), and holds an MFA in Visual Arts from Columbia University (2015). He is the recipient of a 2017 Native Arts and Culture Foundation (NACF) Mentor Artist Fellowship, and Advisor to Indigenous New York.

== Art ==
Jackson Polys' artistic practice explores the history, historiography, and contemporary experience of native peoples. Polys practices wood carving from his traditional training with his father Nathan Jackson, integrating research into traditional native-American carving techniques. In "Manifest X," a collaboration with Robert Mills, the two artists created sculptures that Tlingit visual traditions while revealing the expansive potential for self expression through these forms. This project, among others, seeks to correct the treatment of native artifacts and objects by institutions such as museums.

The World's UnFair by New Red Order, 2023

Jackson Polys taught at Columbia from 2016 to 2017, and was an advisor to Indigenous New York with the Vera List Center for Art and Politics. Polys received a 2017 Native Arts and Cultures Foundation Mentor Artist Fellowship. He is currently collaborating with the Whitney Museum of American Art to establish a land acknowledgement principle.

In 2022, Sealaska Heritage Institute invited carvers to create kootéeyaa (totem poles) for the Totem Pole Trail in Juneau, Alaska. Polys and his father, Nathan Jackson, will carve two poles.

Polys has also worked under the names Stephen Paul Jackson and Stron Softi.

With Adam Khalil and Zack Khalil, whom he met in 2016, he formed the collective New Red Order.

== Selected exhibitions, performances, and screenings ==
- Whitney Biennial, Whitney Museum of American Art, New York, NY, 2019.
- The Crybabies, Alaska State Museum, Juneau, AK, 2019.
- Native Perspectives, Metropolitan Museum of Art, New York, NY, 2018.
- Sealaska Heritage Institute, Juneau, AK, 2018.
- Unholding, Artists Space, New York, NY, 2018.
- The Violence of a Civilization Without Secrets, Sundance Film Festival, 2018.
- Manifest X, Main Street Gallery, Ketchikan, AK, 2018.
- The New Order, Whitney Museum of American Art, 2018.
- My First 3D Part III: The Final Chapter, Microscope Gallery, New York, NY, 2017.
