= Elevator Repair Service =

New York-based theater ensemble

- Formation: 1991
- Type: theater company
- Purpose: experimental theater
- Location: New York, NY, United States
- Artistic director: John Collins
- Notable members: Scott Shepherd
- Website: elevator.org

Elevator Repair Service (ERS) is a New York-based theater ensemble founded by director John Collins and a group of actors in 1991.

ERS has performed in various New York City venues including The Public Theater, New York Theatre Workshop, Performance Space 122, The Performing Garage, HERE Arts Center, The Ontological at St. Mark's Church, The Flea Theater, The Kitchen, and Soho Rep. It has also performed elsewhere in the United States, and in Europe, Australia, and Asia.

Theatre critic Ben Brantley, writing in The New York Times, called its production Gatz starring Scott Shepherd "The most remarkable achievement in theater not only of this year but also of this decade."

In 2008, the ensemble was awarded a grant from the Foundation for Contemporary Arts Grants to Artists Award. ERS has also received numerous awards including an OBIE Award for Sustained Excellence; The Foundation for Contemporary Arts Theater Grant; the Theatre Communications Group's Peter Zeisler Memorial Award for Outstanding Achievement; Eliot Norton Awards for Outstanding Visiting Production, Outstanding Actor, and Outstanding Director; and a Lucille Lortel Award for Alternative Theatrical Experience and Best Director. Artistic Director John Collins received 2011 US Artists Donnelley and Guggenheim Fellowships. Individual ERS ensemble members have received OBIEs for Sustained Excellence in Performance, Lighting Design, and Sound Design.

During its first 15 years, the company worked "with found texts or improvised, anything that wasn't literature" as director John Collins pointed out in an interview. These pieces included Language Instruction (1994), inspired by Andy Kaufman and "How To Speak Dutch" LPs; Cab Legs (1997), referencing Tennessee Williams; and Total Fictional Lie (1998), which drew on documentary films as its source material. On composing these early pieces, former ERS co-director Steve Bodow said, "We like words or movement or sounds that go through a process of several translations. Sometimes it's literal, from one language to another, sometimes it's more metaphorical, from one medium to another."

This has changed with the play Gatz, premiered in 2006, the first of a trilogy (although initially not planned as such) of plays based on American novels from the mid to late 1920s. The trilogy consists of the plays Gatz, The Sound and the Fury (April Seventh, 1928), and The Select (The Sun Also Rises). ERS has adapted these three plays in different ways. For the first play, Gatz, based on the novel The Great Gatsby by F. Scott Fitzgerald (first published 1925), ERS performed every word of the book in a production that lasted over six hours. The second play is based on The Sound and the Fury by William Faulkner (first published 1929), and ERS staged a single chapter. For the third play, based on The Sun Also Rises by Ernest Hemingway (first published 1927), ERS created an edited version of the story using Hemingway's dialogue and some of his prose.

In 2013, ERS was developing two new works for the stage: Arguendo, a staging of the 1991 Supreme Court case Barnes v. Glen Theatre, Inc., slated to premiere at The Public Theater in September 2013, and Fondly, Collette Richland, with preview performances at the Walker Art Center.

In 2024, ERS adapted James Joyce's Ulysses, covering the entire book, restricting lines to words written by Joyce, but "fast forwarding" through much of it to achieve a two hour and forty minute running time. The play, which starts off as a reading with multiple actors sitting at a desk, expands into a fully staged and costumed production as it progresses. ERS' Ulysses had its global premiere at the Fischer Center at Bard College on June 20, 2024, as part of its SummerStage Festival. It was directed by ERS Artistic Director John Collins, with co-direction and dramaturgy by Scott Shepherd who also plays Buck Mulligan and Blazes Boylan.

The play is said to capture the book's "whimsy, dark humor, madcap pace, and trenchant ebullience amid chaos."

== Works ==
Works by Elevator Repair Service:

- Mr. Antipyrene, Fire Extinguisher
- Marx Brothers on Horseback Salad
- Spine Check
- Language Instruction: Love Family vs. Andy Kaufman
- McGurk: A Cautionary Tale
- Shut Up I Tell You (I Said Shut Up I Tell You)
- Cab Legs
- Total Fictional Lie
- Highway to Tomorrow
- Room Tone
- Gatz
- No Great Society
- The Sound and the Fury (April Seventh, 1928)
- The Select (The Sun Also Rises)
- Shuffle
- Arguendo
- Fondly, Collette Richland
- Measure for Measure
- Everyone's Fine with Virginia Woolf
- Seagull
- Baldwin and Buckley at Cambridge
- Ulysses
