= John Kelsey (artist) =

American artist, writer and art dealer

- Known for: Artist, critic, and art dealer

John Kelsey is an American artist, writer and art dealer. Since 1999, he has been a member of the artist collective Bernadette Corporation. In 2004, he co-founded Reena Spaulings Fine Art with Emily Sundblad. The gallery was named after Bernadette Corporation's novel of the same name.

== Publications ==
- John Kelsey. 2010. Rich texts: selected writing for art. Berlin: Sternberg Press. OCLC 702491906
