= E'wao Kagoshima =

Japanese artist

- Born: 1945 (age 80–81); Niigata, Japan
- Education: Tokyo National University of Fine Arts
- Occupation: Artist
- Years active: 1960s-present
- Known for: Japanese Pop Art, painting, sculpture, collage
- Style: Pop Surrealism

E'wao Kagoshima (born 1945 in Japan) is a Japanese artist whose varying media includes painting, sculpture and collage. Kagoshima's work is known through the canon of Japanese Pop Art, and he has had solo exhibitions at the Nagai Gallery, Tokyo; Gabrielle Bryers Gallery, New York; The New Museum, New York; Mitchell Algus Gallery, New York; Algus Greenspon, New York; The Box, L.A.; and Ulterior Gallery, New York. Kagoshima has been included in exhibitions at the Institute of Contemporary Arts, London; The Asian American Art Center, New York; The Laforet Museum, Tokyo and Osaka; Marlborough Gallery, New York; MoMA PS1, New York; White Columns, New York; Martos Gallery, New York; Galerie Rodolphe Janssen, Brussels; and Sculpture Center, New York. His mid-career retrospective was taken place at the Center for Art, Research, and Alliances (CARA) in New York in 2025.

== Background and education ==
Kagoshima was born in Niigata, Japan in 1945 and grew up in Tokyo. He received his BFA from the Tokyo National University of Fine Arts in 1969, before moving to New York City in 1976 where he now lives and works in Queens.

== Work ==
Kagoshima emerged as an artist in Tokyo, Japan in the late 1960s with his Pop-Art inspired and appropriated sculptures of paint cans and cups, captured in frozen moments of spilling. Upon his arrival in New York in 1976, Kagoshima soon found himself part of the East Village's burgeoning art scene where he began producing hyper-imaginative and erotic paintings borrowing visual elements from Picasso, Klossowski and Baldessari. His paintings, collages and sculptures soon included caricatures as kitsch grew in his art to meet explorations of art history and traditional Japanese culture, expressed through his particular brand of Pop Surrealism.

== Solo exhibitions ==
- 2026 : "Deconstructed Bodies", Ulterior Gallery, New York, New York
- 2025 : "E'wao Kagoshima: Animated Minds", Center for Art, Research and Alliance, New York, New York
- 2018 : The Box, Los Angeles, California
- 2018 : Greenspon, New York, New York
- 2017 : Galerie Gregor Staiger, Zurich, Switzerland
- 2014 : Algus Greenspon, New York, New York
- 2013 : FIAC, Paris, France
- 2011 : Algus Greenspon Gallery, New York, NY
- 2008 : Mitchell Algus Gallery, New York, NY
- 1997 : Mitchell Algus Gallery, New York, NY
- 1986 : Alexander Wood Gallery, New York, NY
- 1983 : Gabrielle Bryers Gallery, New York, NY
- 1983 : The New Museum, New York, NY
- 1982 : Ten Gallery, Fukuoka, JA
- 1976 : Peter Franagan Gallery, New York, NY
- 1976 : Nagai Gallery, Tokyo, JA
- 1975 : Matto Grosso Gallery, Tokyo, JA
- 1971 : Miniature Shop, Tokyo Gallery, Tokyo, JA

== Group exhibitions ==
- 2024 : Voyage, Ulterior Gallery, New York, New York
- 2018 : the Seam, the Fault, the Flaw, Greenspon, New York, New York
- 2018 : Alexandra da Cunha & E'wao Kagoshima, Office Baroque, Brussels, Belgium
- 2018 : 2:00, Fig., Tokyo, Japan
- 2018 : Baltic Triennial, Contemporary Art Centre, Vilnius, Lithuania
- 2018 : Condo, London, 2018, England
- 2017 : Therianthropy, Laura Bartlett Gallery, London, England
- 2016 : The History Show, Fox Production, New York, New York
- 2016 : Animality, curated by Jens Hoffmann, Marian Goodman, London, England
- 2016 : Concept, Performance, Documentation, Language, Mitchell Algus Gallery
- 2016 : Romeo (Inaugural Show), New York, New York
- 2016 : Paramount Ranch III, Agoura Hills, California
- 2015 : Unorthodox, Jewish Museum, New York
- 2014 : Painters of Modern Life, Curated by Mitchell Algus, The Box, Los Angeles, CA
- 2013 : E'wao Kagoshima and Luther Price, Vilma Gold, London, UK
- 2013 : Better Homes, Curated by Ruba Katrib, Sculpture Center, Long Island City, NY
- 2013 : Rien Faire Et Laisser Rire / Do Nothing and Let Them Laugh, Curated by Bob Nickas, Galerie Rodolphe Janssen, Ixelles, BE
- 2012 : Creature from the Blue Lagoon, Martos Gallery, organized by Bob Nickas, Bridgehampton, NY
- 2012 : Frieze Art Fair, Regents Park, London, UK
- 2011 : HAPPY HOLIDAYS! DRAWINGS!, Alex Zachary, New York, NY
- 2011 : Looking Back / The 6th White Columns Annual, Selected by Nick Mauss and Ken Okiishi, White Columns, New York, NY
- 2011 : Foot to Foot: Alisa Baremboym, Darren Bader, Andrei Koschmieder, E'wao Kagoshima, Debo Eilers, Tim Lokiec, Amy Yao, curated by Margaret Lee, Regina Gallery, London, UK
- 2010 : Greater New York, selection by Matt Hoyt, P.S. 1, New York, NY
- 1996 : Exquisite Corps, curated by Mitchell Algus and Bob Nickas, Mitchell Algus Gallery, New York, NY
- 1995 : The Ideal, Mitchell Algus Gallery, New York, NY
- 1994 : The Pop Image, Marlborough Gallery, New York, NY
- 1988 : Group Show, fiction/nonfiction Gallery (Jose Frere), New York, NY
- 1987 : One Eye or Two?, Asian American Art Center, New York, NY
- 1985 : Correspondence: New York Art Now, Laforet Museum, Tokyo and Osaka, JA
- 1983 : New Blood, Gabrielle Bryers Gallery, New York, NY
- 1982 : The Graphic Rap Show, Institute of Contemporary Arts, London, UK
- 1979 : A Survey of Contemporary Japanese Art '79, Japanese Society
- 1978 : The Great American Foot Show, Museum of Contemporary Crafts, New York, NY
- 1974 : Craft Asakusa Gallery, Tokyo, JA

== Press ==
- Rosenberg, Karen, "Home is Where You Create It 'Better Homes' at SculptureCenter." The New York Times, May 2, 2013.
- Viveros-Faune, Christian, "Bitter Homes and Gardens: 'Better Homes' at Sculpture Center." Village Voice, May 2013.
- Rosenberg, Karen, "Check Out the Gallery in the Freezer: Creature from the Blue Lagoon in Bridgehampton." The New York Times, August 2, 2012.
- Neil, Jonathan T. D., "E'wao Kagoshima." Art Review, April 2011.
- Diaz, Eva, "E'wao Kagoshima." Artforum, March 2011.
- Kley, Elisabeth, "E'wao Kagoshima." Time Out New York, February 2011.
- Carlin, T.J., "E'wao Kagoshima." Artforum.com, February 2011.
- Schwabsky, Barry, "Natural, Anti-Naturalism: Painting." Flash Art, Jan/Feb 1988.
- Christov-Bakargiev, Carolyn, "Arte Povera 1967-1987." Flash Art, Nov/Dec 1987.
- Schwabsky, Barry, "Paul Laster / E'wao Kagoshima." Artmart, 1986.
- Dodds, Robin, "E'wao Kagoshima." The New Museum, 1983.
- Rosenberg, Karen "E'wao Kagoshima." The New York Times, 2014.
