= Fabian Marcaccio =

Argentine-Italian artist

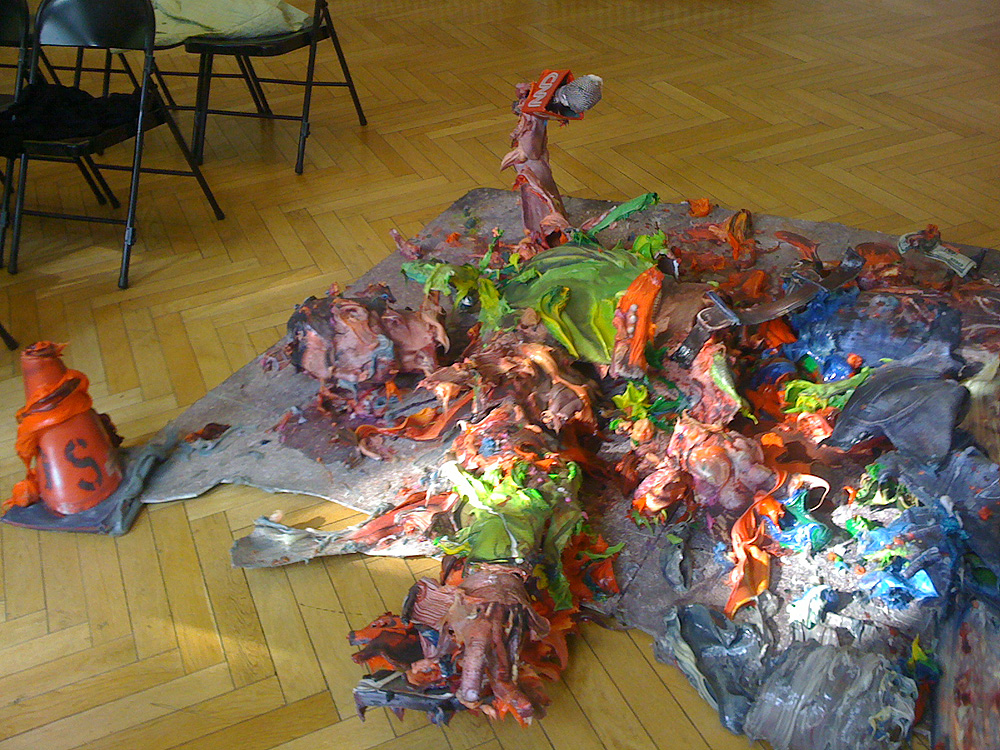
CNN Structural Canvas 2009, pigmented ink on canvas, Aluminium, Silikon, 20x183x127 cm

Fabian Marcaccio (born 1963 in Rosario, Argentina) is an Argentine-Italian born artist living and working in the United States whose trans-genre works including "Paintants" and '"Draftants" have been exhibited worldwide.

Marcaccio was born to a native Argentine mother and Italian father in Rosario de Santa Fe where he later attended the University of Philosophy. In 1985, at age 22, he moved to New York City, where he continues to live and work. He has exhibited widely throughout the United States, Europe and South America. In 2004, Kunstmuseum Liechtenstein organized a retrospective of his work, the same year that a solo exhibition was mounted at the Miami Art Museum. He regularly exhibits with galleries in New York, Los Angeles, Berlin, Paris, Cologne and Barcelona. He has participated in numerous group exhibitions, including; the 44th Biennial Exhibition of Contemporary American Painting, Corcoran Gallery of Art, Washington, DC in 1995, Summer Projects at PS1 Contemporary Art Center, New York in 2002, and Documenta 11, Kassel, Germany in 2002. His multidisciplinary collaborations include projects with the architect Greg Lynn that resulted in an exhibition at the Wexner Center for the Arts, Columbus, Ohio in 2001 and projects with composer Claudio Baroni creating animated operas and a 2005 scored, paintball performance at Weston Hall in Toronto, Ontario, Canada.

Marcaccio's work investigates whether the traditional medium of painting can survive in the digital age. He has used printmaking transfer techniques to make paintings and became well known in the 1990s for his manipulations of the conventions of painting. More recently, he has relied upon digital and industrial techniques to infuse his painting process with spatial and temporal concerns. The results are environmental paintings, animations, and “Paintants” that combine digitally manipulated imagery, sculptural form, and three dimensionally painted surfaces.

On September 10, 2011, Marcaccio received the "Bernhard Heiliger Award for Sculpture 2011" from the Mayor of Berlin, Klaus Wowereit.
