= Torbjørn Rødland =

Norwegian photographer

- Born: 1970 (age 55–56); Stavanger, Norway
- Occupation: Photographer

Torbjørn Rødland (born 1970) is a Norwegian photographic artist, whose images are saturated with symbolism, lyricism, and eroticism. His 2017 Serpentine Gallery solo exhibition was titled The Touch That Made You and travelled to the Fondazione Prada in Milan in 2018. His work was shown at the Venice Biennale of 1999. An early retrospective was held at the Astrup Fearnley Museum of Modern Art in Oslo in 2003.

Among public collections holding examples of his work are the Whitney Museum of American Art in New York City, the Museum of Modern Art in New York City, the Fonds national d'art contemporain in Paris, the Stedelijk Museum in Amsterdam, the Museum of Contemporary Art Chicago, and Moderna Museet in Stockholm.

== Background and education ==
Rødland lives and works in Los Angeles, California. He was born in 1970 in Stavanger, Norway. As a teenager, he freelanced for multiple Norwegian newspapers as an editorial cartoonist. Rødland studied Photography at the National College of Art and Design in Bergen (Norway) and cultural studies at the University of Stavanger.

== Work ==
Rødland's photographs are produced through film-based cameras and chemical processing. Art historian and critic Ina Blom has reflected in Artforum on the philosophical and cultural implications of his works: "The strangeness of these images might have triggered other intuitions—perhaps related to the question of what exactly it means to 'be' a photographic image amid a veritable surfeit of new-media technologies, environments, and objects." Wanting to push forward the artistic boundaries of his medium, Rødland has reconceptualized and integrated aesthetic qualities dismissed in postmodern art. Building on work by The Pictures Generation and Jeff Wall, Rødland's photography represents a surprising revaluation of lyricism and what he calls the sensuality of the photographic moment. Originally known for his portraits in Nordic landscapes, Rødland transcended this potential trope by consistently inventing new lures for viewers of his photographs. An example of these lures is the subtle co-existence of the twisted with the warm normalcy of his figures; as seen in his photograph of a woman's hand with an octopus tentacle creeping through her sleeve and wrapped around her fingers. Also a subtle symbol of nonduality, this image is characteristic of Rødland's work. His matter of factness, even in stylized imagery and multiple exposures, is what allows Rødland to straddle both the commonplace and the otherworldly. According to Rødland, "the struggle is to make the image active and relatable; clear but complex. Like our new reality, it has to be layered and open to paranoid interpretation." Or, as curator Bennett Simpson put it in an essay on Rødland, published in 2000: "His images are subjunctive; they operate under the yoke of a doubt, an impacted desire, the possibility of an impossibility."

Between 2004 and 2007 Rødland produced six video works. One of these, titled 132 BPM, was exhibited solo at MoMA PS1 (Long Island City) and at the Hiroshima City Museum of Contemporary Art (Hiroshima). In 2018 Rødland produced a new video work, titled Between Fork and Ladder, which appeared in his solo exhibition Fifth Honeymoon at Bergen Kunsthall (Bergen). The solo exhibition Fifth Honeymoon was presented again in 2019 at both Bonniers Konsthall (Sweden) as well as Museum of Contemporary Art Kiasma (Helsinki). Rødland's most recent video, Elegy for the Silent, was finished in 2020 and included in a solo exhibition at The Contemporary Austin titled Bible Eye in 2021.

== Books ==
- Fifth Honeymoon, Sternberg Press / Bergen Kunsthall / Bonniers Konsthall / Kiasma Museum of Contemporary Art: Berlin / Bergen / Stockholm / Helsinki, 2018. ISBN 9783956794124
- The Touch That Made You, Serpentine Galleries / Koenig Books: London, 2017. ISBN 9781908617484 ISBN 9783960982371
- The Model, MACK: London, October 2017. ISBN 9781910164945
- Confabulations, MACK: London, June 2016. ISBN 9781910164631
- Sasquatch Century, Mousse Publisher / Henie Onstad Art Center: Milano / Oslo, 2015. ISBN 9788867491308
- Vanilla Partner, MACK: London, October 2012. ISBN 9781907946318
- Andy Capp Variations, Hassla: New York, 2011. ISBN 9780982547168
- A day in the life of.., Libraryman: Stockholm, 2009. ISBN 9789186269029
- I Want to Live Innocent, SteidlMACK: Göttingen, February 2008. ISBN 9783865216175
- White Planet, Black Heart, SteidlMACK: Göttingen, June 2006. ISBN 3865212220
