= Gene Beery =

American painter (1937–2023)

- Born: October 13, 1937; Racine, Wisconsin, U.S.
- Died: November 19, 2023 (aged 86); Sutter Creek, California, U.S.
- Occupations: Painter, photographer

Gene Beery (October 13, 1937 – November 19, 2023) was an American painter and photographer, who has been described as an expressionist, Pop artist, minimalist, and conceptualist over his career of fifty-plus years. He was primarily known for his text-based canvases, based on the concept that words and the ideas they provoke can exist as works of art in themselves. Living and working in New York City in the late 1950s and early 1960s, Beery was at the center of the development of both Pop and Conceptual art. From the 1990s, Beery also worked as a photographer, intimately documenting his family, friends and life in a snapshot style. He lived and worked in Sutter Creek, California until his death on November 19, 2023, at the age of 86.

Beery is represented by Derosia in New York, and Parker Gallery in Los Angeles.

== Background and education ==
Beery was born in Racine, Wisconsin, on October 13, 1937. He attended the University of Wisconsin–Milwaukee and the Layton School of Art, Milwaukee before moving to New York City in the late 1950s where he joined the Arts Student League and became a guard at the Museum of Modern Art.

== Work ==
Working as a guard at the Museum of Modern Art he was befriended by James Rosenquist and Sol LeWitt, his Hester Street neighbor. In 1961 Beery’s ramshackle hybrid paintings incorporating words and figures were selected for the Museum of Modern Art’s Recent Figure Painting U.S.A. where they caught Max Ernst’s attention. The surrealist was so impressed he awarded Beery $100 on the spot. This windfall was followed by another award from the William and Norma Copley Foundation. Clearly, Beery’s art had struck a chord within New York’s still extant surrealist community. Marcel Duchamp, who upon meeting the artist for the first time awarded him a cigar, was soon a fan and must have seen in Beery’s art many of the same qualities he found in the art of Louis Eilshemius; paintings that were eccentric, direct, primitive, and archetypically American.

Art critic Ken Johnson in his review called Gene Berry's work as definitely funny. Seen in art world hindsight it was also ahead of its time, prefiguring the language-based conceptual art of the late 1960s, from John Baldessari to Lawrence Weiner and Robert Barry. While other artists using text and numbers who emerged in the 1960s produced mostly cerebral work lacking evidence of the artist’s hand, Beery seemingly poked fun at the high Conceptualism of the day. He continued to make his uniquely homespun and humorously irreverent canvases, the rawness of their execution a throwback to the Abstract Expressionists. Beery’s free-wheeling humor and graphic flair also align his work with that other then-developing style, Pop Art. Over the years Sol LeWitt remained Beery’s greatest champion; rescuing works from his abandoned New York studio and making these a foundational part of the Sol and Carol LeWitt collection at the Wadsworth Atheneum, as well as underwriting the publication of Beery’s many artist’s books.

After a successful exhibition of his paintings at the Alexander Iolas Gallery in New York in 1963 Beery left town to take residence in San Francisco, and later Petaluma. Several years later the artist moved into the foothills of the Sierra Nevada Mountains outside Sacramento where he continued to live and work.

== Solo exhibitions ==
- 2020 – Transmissions from Logoscape Ranch, Bodega, New York
- 2019 – New Mythic Visualizations, Cushion Works, San Francisco
- 2019 – Gene Beery, Kunsthalle Fribourg, Fribourg, Switzerland
- 2017 – Wall Dancers, Shoot The Lobster, Los Angeles, California
- 2016 – Logoscapes / Visual Percussion, Jan Kaps, Cologne, Germany
- 2013 – Early Paintings / Later Photographs, Algus Greenspon, New York, NY
- 2010 – Algus Greenspon Gallery, New York, NY
- 1999 – Mitchell Algus Gallery, New York, NY
- 1997 – Mitchell Algus Gallery, New York, NY
- 1979 – Matrix 55, Wadsworth Atheneum, Hartford, CT
- 1970 – Quay Gallery, San Francisco, CA
- 1963 – Alexander Iolas Gallery, New York, NY

== Selected group exhibitions ==
- 2020 – Ride Off Like A Cowboy Into Your Sunset, Aguirre, Mexico City, Mexico
- 2018 – After Hours in a California Arts Studio, Andrew Kreps, New York, NY
- 2016 – The Silo, Garth Greenan Gallery, New York, NY
- 2015 – I Dropped the Lemon Tart, Lisa Cooley, New York, NY
- 2015 – June, Simone Subal Gallery, New York, NY
- 2014 – Keeping a Close Eye on the Wind, (with Josh Abelow), Bodega, New York, NY
- 2013 – The Picnic: Adriana Lara & Gene Beery, Algus Greenspon, New York, NY
- 2013 – Sol Lewitt as Collector. An Artist and his Artists, Museo d’ Arte Contemporanea Donna Regina, Naples, IT; Centre Pompidou-Metz, Paris, France
- 2012 – Materializing "Six Years": Lucy R. Lippard and the Emergence of Conceptual Art, Brooklyn Museum, Brooklyn, NY
- 2012 – Context Message, Zach Feuer, New York, NY
- 2011 – Summer Salt, The Proposition, New York, NY
- 2010 – White Columns Annual, (Curated by Bob Nickas), White Columns, New York, NY
- 2008 – Never Work (Curated by Roger White), 191 Henry St, New York, NY
- 2006 – Exquisite Corpse (Curated by Bob Nickas and Mitchell Algus), Mitchell Algus Gallery, New York, NY
- 1975 – 1975 Biennial Exhibition, Whitney Museum of American Art, New York, NY
- 1970 – 955,000 (Curated by Lucy Lippard), Vancouver Art Gallery, Vancouver, Canada
- 1969 – 557,087 (Curated by Lucy Lippard), Vancouver Art Gallery, Vancouver, Canada
- 1969 – The Spirit of Comics, University of Pennsylvania Institute Contemporary Art (ICA), PA
- 1965 – 51st Wisconsin Painters and Sculptors Annual, Milwaukee Art Center, Milwaukee, WI
- 1962 – Recent Painting USA: The Figure, Museum of Modern Art, New York, NY

== Publications ==
- Lovay, Balthazar (ed.), Kenneth Goldsmith, Jo Melvin, Gregor Quack. Gene Beery, Fri Art & Mousse Publishing, 2019. (ISBN 978-88-6749-374-6)
- "Gene Beery." Matrix 55, Wadsworth Antheneum, March 1980.
