= Kunstmuseum Luzern =

Swiss art museum in Lucerne

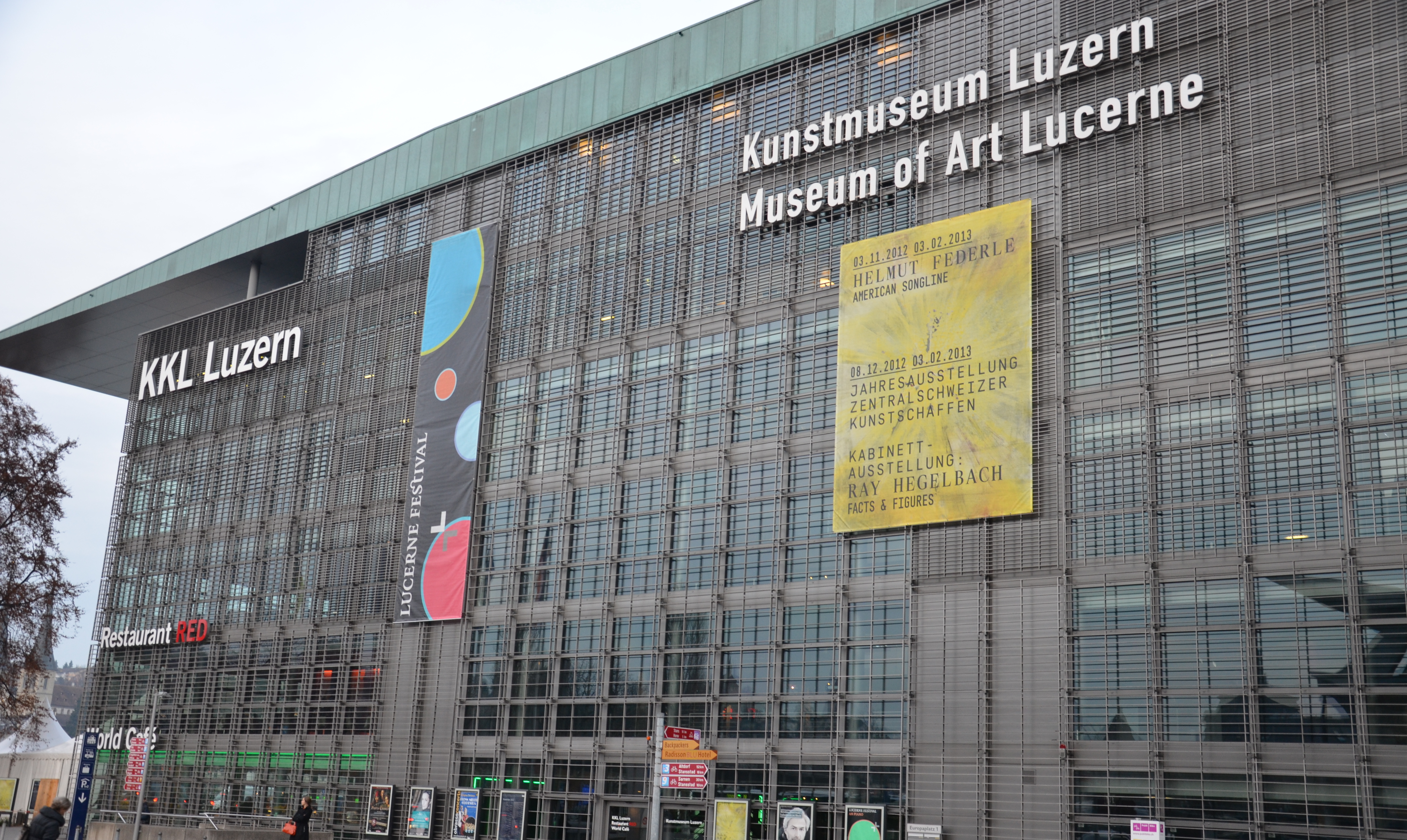
- Former name: Musée des beaux-arts Lucerne, Neues Kunstmuseum Luzern
- Established: 1932
- Location: Europaplatz 1, Lucerne, Switzerland
- Coordinates: 47°03′01″N 8°18′43″E
- Type: Art museum
- Director: Fanni Fetzer
- Architect: Jean Nouvel
- Owner: Art Society Lucerne (Kunstgesellschaft Luzern)
- Website: www.kunstmuseumluzern.ch

Kunstmuseum Luzern (Museum of Art Lucerne) is an art museum founded in 1932, is located within the Lucerne Culture and Congress Centre (or KKL Luzern). It is one of the most important art museums in Switzerland, known for its temporary rotating exhibitions of all genres, including contemporary art.

== History ==
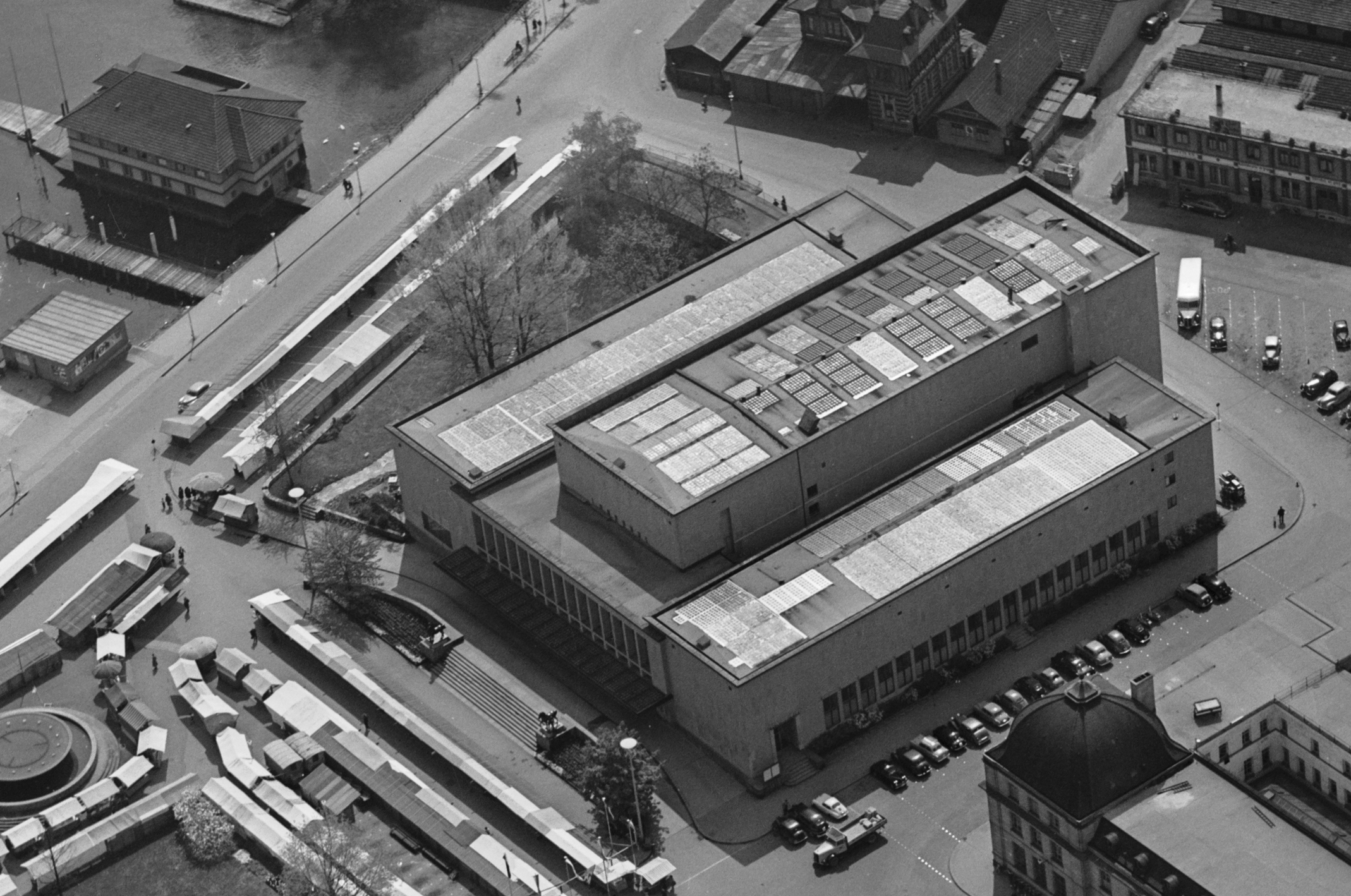
Former building by Armin Meili

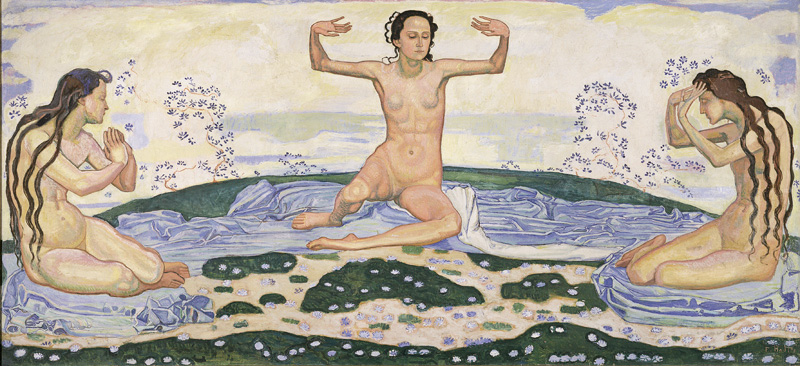
"Le Jour III" (c. 1910) painting by Ferdinand Hodler from the Kunstmuseum Luzern art collection

The Art Society Lucerne (German: Kunstgesellschaft Luzern) was founded in 1819 with the aim of creating a forum for artists and citizens interested in art and providing them with premises for exhibitions. In 1932, the Kunstmuseum Luzern moved into the Kunst- und Kongresshaus building (nicknamed Meili-Bau) built by Armin Meili (1892–1981), which was expanded in the 1970s.

Since 1982, the Kunstmuseum Luzern has represented Lucerne and the Canton of Lucerne at the Manor Cultural Prize, held once every two years.

In 1991, the Meili-designed building was demolished. From 1996 to 1998, the new Lucerne Culture and Congress Center (KKL Luzern) was constructed on the same site, designed by the French architect Jean Nouvel. In 2001, the museum was moved into the newly designed Kunst- und Kongresshaus building.

== About ==
The Kunstmuseum Luzern is located on the 4th floor of the Lucerne Culture and Congress Centre in Lucerne. The art collection of the Kunstmuseum Luzern sees itself as a "cultural archive of the Central Switzerland region" and houses several thousand objects from the Renaissance to the present-day. The museum shows five to eight temporary exhibitions per year, featuring artists of both Swiss and international origins. Past exhibitions have reached an audience of 30,000 to 50,000 people.

Fanni Fetzer has served as the museum director since 1 October 2011.

== See also ==
- List of contemporary art museums
- List of museums in Switzerland
