= Bernadette Corporation =

Art and fashion collective

Bernadette Corporation is a New York City and Paris-based art and fashion collective founded in 1994. Founded by Bernadette Van-Huy, Sonny Pak, and Thuy Pham, its core members include Van-Huy, John Kelsey, Jim Fletcher, and Antek Walczak. Influences from fashion to film include Vivienne Westwood, Malcolm McLaren, and Jean-Luc Godard.

== History ==
When Bernadette Corporation first formed, they were hired to organize parties at downtown nightclubs. The group quickly began making fashion and took part in the world of 1990s underground fashion. In the 1990s, their clothes were published in Harper's Bazaar, Purple, Visionaire, Index Magazine, and Artforum. They take influences from the "three Bs"; Barthes, Bataille and Baudrillard.

In the late 1990s, Bernadette Corporation became more productive as a publishing, film, and video group, briefly publishing the magazine Made in USA, named after the Jean-Luc Godard film of the same name.

In 2001 Bernadette Corporation temporarily merged with Le Parti Imaginaire to make the film Get Rid of Yourself, which retains both fiction and documentary elements. The Bernadette Corporation's other films include; The B.C. Corporate Story, Hell Frozen Over, and Get Rid of Yourself.

Bernadette Corporation is known for its performance, fashion, and art which in varying ways emulates and disturbs corporations.

== Bernadette Van Huy ==
Bernadette van Huy is a New York—based artist and one of the founding members of Bernadette Corporation. She moved to Manhattan at the age of 23 at which point she began to organise parties in New York nightclubs. As of 2016, van Huy is one of the two currently active members of the collective with John Kelsey. In 1997 she worked as the costume designer for the Harmony Korine film Gummo.

== Publications ==
- Made in USA magazine
- Bernadette Corporation (Collective). 2004. Reena Spaulings. New York: Semiotext(e). OCLC 61856276
- Vasiljevic, David. 2011. Bernadette Corporation: the complete poem. London: Koenig Books Ltd. OCLC 698171014

== Exhibitions ==
- How to make 'life' fashionable?, Galerie Meerrettich, Volksbühne Pavilion, Berlin, October 2003
- Cinéma des damnés / Tout doit disparaître, Galerie Yvon Lambert, Le Studio / Project Room, Paris, Sept. 2004
- Bernadette Corporation, Witte de With, Rotterdam, November 2005
- Bernadette Corporation - King Kong, Hamburg Kunstverein, January 2006
- Be Corpse, Volksbühne Pavilion, Galerie Meerrettich, Berlin, November 2006
- Bernadette Corporation - How To Cook A Wolf, Kunsthalle Zürich Parallel, January 2007
- Multiplyplex, Künstlerhaus Stuttgart, March 2007
- Películas, Perros Negros, Mexico City, late May - late July 2007
- The Complete Poem, Greene Naftali, New York, September 2009
- A Haven for the Soul, Galerie Neu, Berlin, Germany. November–December 2010
- Bernadette Corporation: 2000 Wasted Years, Artists Space, New York, 2012
- The Gay Signs, Gaga, Los Angeles, May 2017
- Bernadette Corporation, Greene Naftali, New York, February 2023

== Public collections ==
Works by Bernadette Corporation are part of public art collections such as Museo Jumex, Mexico City; Stedelijk Museum, Amsterdam; Whitney Museum of Art, New York; among others.
