= Chris Kraus (writer) =

American writer and critic (born 1955)

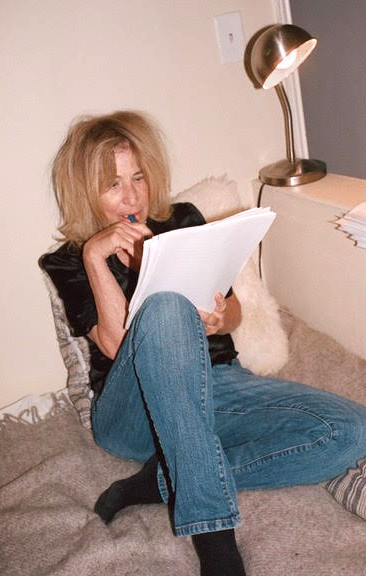
- Kraus, c. 2024
- Born: 1955 (age 70–71); New York City, U.S.
- Education: Victoria University of Wellington
- Occupations: Writer, critic
- Spouse: Sylvère Lotringer (m. 1988; sep. 2005, div. 2014)

Chris Kraus (born 1955) is an American and New Zealand writer, critic, editor, filmmaker, performance artist, and educator. Her work includes the novels I Love Dick, Aliens and Anorexia, and Torpor, which form a loose trilogy that navigates between autobiography, fiction, philosophy, critical theory, and art criticism. She has also written a sequence of novels dealing with American underclass experience, beginning with Summer of Hate. Her approach to writing has been described as ‘performance art within the medium of writing’ and ‘a bright map of presence’. Kraus' work often blends intellectual, political, and sexual concerns with wit, oscillating between esoteric referencing and parody. Her work has drawn controversy for equalizing high and low culture, mixing critical theory with colloquial language, and graphic representations of sex.

Kraus has also produced plays and films, including the feature film Gravity & Grace. Her work has featured in publications such as Artforum, Art in America, Modern Painters, Afterall, The New Yorker, The New York Times Literary Supplement, The Paris Review, The Los Angeles Review of Books, Bookforum, and Texte zur Kunst. She taught creative writing and art writing at The European Graduate School/EGS for ten years and has been Writer in Residence at ArtCenter College of Design. Kraus is the recipient of a Guggenheim Fellowship for General Non-Fiction (2016), a Warhol Foundation Arts Writing Grant (2011), and Frank Jewett Mather Award for Art Criticism from the College Art Association (2008).

Kraus is co-editor of the publishing house Semiotext(e). Her bestselling novel, I Love Dick, was adapted for television by Joey Soloway and released on Amazon Video in 2018. Holland Cotter has described her as ‘one of our smartest and most original writers on contemporary art and culture’.

== Personal history and education ==
Chris Kraus was born in The Bronx, New York City, in 1955, and moved to Milford, Connecticut, with her family when she was 5 years old. In 1969, she emigrated to New Zealand under the government's Assisted Passage Scheme. She attended Wellington High School and later the Victoria University of Wellington, where she received a Wellington Publishing Scholarship in Journalism at the age of 16. She has credited moving to New Zealand at such a young age with "saving her life."

She worked in journalism for five years, as a feature writer for the New Zealand Sunday Times and as a TV critic and page editor for the Evening Post. In 1976, she left New Zealand for London, where she lived for a short time before moving to New York. There, she worked odd jobs and studied theatre, first with Richard Schechner and The Performance Group, and later with Ruth Maleczech and Mabou Mines, becoming a member of their studio, ReCherChez. Kraus, along with her collaborator Suzan Cooper, worked for artist Louise Bourgeois who became their friend and associate. Kraus cites Bourgeois as an influence on her as a developing artist, describing her as an exemplar and mentor, for whom Kraus worked as a messenger, often transporting artworks by bicycle. Kraus recalled that Bourgeois would always 'tell you the straight shit,’ a lesson that Kraus carried forward in her own teaching, stating: ‘To just put it all on the table, to say everything you see and you know, and let people work with that’. Kraus also worked as a personal assistant to actor Rip Torn. In 1980, she achieved her first success with her play Disparate Action/Desperate Action at ReCherChez, in which she acted alongside critical theory professor Tom Yemm. In 1983, she abandoned her acting career on the advice of Ruth Maleczech, who encouraged her to pursue filmmaking, saying, 'You're a director, you should make films'. Between 1983 and 1984, Kraus worked as Monday Night Coordinator at St. Mark's Poetry Project.

She met critical theory professor Sylvère Lotringer in 1984 and began collaborating with him on creative projects, including working as co-editor at his independent publishing house Semiotext(e). In 1987, they relocated as a couple to Thurman, New York, in the Southern Adirondacks, which would later become the setting for Kraus's third novel, Torpor.

== Writing style ==
Kraus’ writing is characterized by a mix of high and low culture, oscillating between sex writing, art criticism, philosophy, critical theory, street slang and classical forms. She has been influenced by French theory, French autofiction, and American New Narrative, of which she has been a key proponent. Her debut novel, I Love Dick, is an exemplar of autofiction, blending autobiography, experimentation, and a mix of graphic sex and intellectualism. The novel's combination of art criticism and autobiography, which Kraus coined as ‘Ficto-criticism’, is considered a milestone in the development of the autotheory genre. Kraus’ subsequent novels have continued to develop this style, employing autobiographical loops, as in Aliens and Anorexia, and combining contemporary life writing with classical third-person prose, as in Torpor.

Form is central to the development of each of Kraus’ works, with the author stating ‘The form is everything. The form is really how I arrive at how I'm going to write and what the book is going to be’. Much of her work dealing with female emotion contains writing that alternates between fragmentary bursts of obsession, desire, and vulnerability, often stepping back to analyze itself philosophically.

Since her film How to Shoot a Crime provoked audiences with its mix of transgressive content and cerebral frameworks, Kraus has continued to court controversy. By equalizing the base and the theoretical and blending theory with an effortless, colloquial style that contrasts with academic conventions, Kraus’ use of autobiography challenges expectations of how a female writer should write. She has drawn parallels between notions of ‘privacy’ in contemporary female art and accusations of ‘obscenity’ directed at certain male artists of the 1960s, embracing the analysis of female vulnerability as an act of assertion. Her presention of personal experiences outside traditional confessional frameworks has been described as confrontational. As Kraus explained in an interview with the Brooklyn Rail, ‘What really fucks with everyone's heads is when women, gay men, combine graphic first-person sex stuff with quote-unquote objective, analytic cultural thought. There's a deep pity and horror of female sexuality behind this, as if it's this mushy botanical subordinate thing at total variance with the dynamic integrity, the ‘masculinity’ of analytical thought [...] In I Love Dick, I consciously set out to see if I could say ‘cunt’ and ‘Kierkegaard’ in the same sentence. And I did it, it drives people crazy’.

Her work has been variously received, in part due to its refusal to conform to genre expectations. While ‘confessing’ private experiences, Kraus complicates these disclosures by refusing to define their genre. As Ann Yoder says, ‘Kraus often creates intimacy through self-revelation and prostration on the page, and part of her genius resides in masking where reality cedes to fiction’.

Kraus has spoken about her strive for accuracy and humor in her writing, stating: ‘maybe I can't be a ‘Great Writer', but I may have the ability to be accurate. And hopefully, at the same time, amusing—that's the NY School thing—to convey complicated ideas with some conversational charm’. Her work addresses themes of loneliness, failure, sexual politics, and the loneliness of globalization, weaving associative threads of history, theory, popular culture, and the diaristic with a punk rock attitude and critical insight.

== Semiotext(e)/editorial ==
In 1990, Kraus introduced the Native Agents imprint to Lotringer's independent press Semiotext(e), conceived as a complement or challenge to his highly regarded Foreign Agents series, which brought French theorists like Deleuze and Guattari to American readers.

Native Agents initially published a series of new first-person female fiction, featuring authors who used what Kraus described as 'the same public ‘I’ expressed in French theories... ' Kraus wanted to push back against the expectation that female ‘confession’ should be made within a repentant therapeutic narrative, insisting that 'all sorts of experience—even romantic obsession, dependence, and desperate pursuit, stereotypically ‘female’ states of abjection—hold universal significance'. Early writers include Ann Rower, Cookie Mueller, Kathy Acker, Eileen Myles, Kate Zambreno, and Michelle Tea. The imprint also included male writers such as Jarett Kobek's Atta and Lodovico Pignatti Moran's Nicola, Milan, demonstrating a commitment to diversity while resisting the idea of the straight middle-class white male as the ultimate subject.

In 2001, Hedi El Kholti joined Semiotext(e), furthering its mission of translating French authors for American readers and putting them in dialogue with American writers. El Kholti adopted the Native Agent's ethos of refusing to identify with any particular genre, going on to publish writers such as Marie Darrieussecq, Mathieu Lindon, Abdellah Taïa, Michel Leiris, and Hervé Guibert.

In 2009, Semiotext(e) launched a new imprint, the Intervention Series, which publishes ‘polemical texts by intellectual agitators'. The books are printed in a pocket-sized, simple format, featuring manifestos, essays, and critiques from a range of writers specializing in a variety of political and cultural topics, including Maurizio Lazzarato, Jackie Wang, and Paul D. Preciado. Kraus's book Where Art Belongs was the first book published by the imprint written by a female author, breaking its run of male writers or, potentially, unnamed or anonymous female members of Tiqqun and the Invisible Committee.

== Books ==
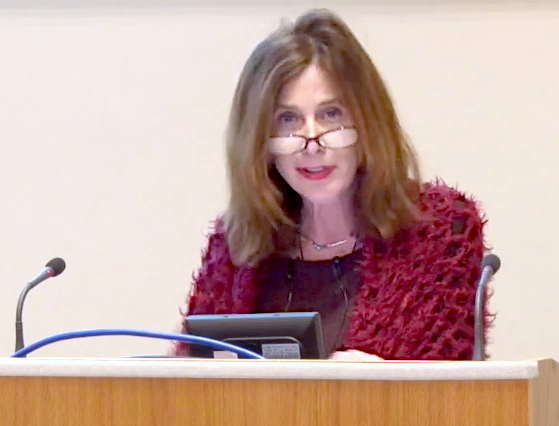
Kraus at the Royal College of Art (2015)

=== Novels ===
==== I Love Dick (1997) ====
Described by The Guardian as a ‘cult feminist classic’, Kraus’ bestselling debut is an epistolary novel with autofictional elements, blurring the lines of fiction, essay, and memoir. It tells the story of Chris, a 39-year-old ‘failed’ video artist, and her husband Sylvère, a cultural critic more than a decade her senior. When the couple visit Sylvère's friend, Dick, Chris conceives an unrequited passion for him, and her husband colludes with her to play it out in love letters- letters Sylvère reads, sometimes co-writes, and which they mostly do not send. These letters proliferate into autobiographical confessions, essays on artists and intellectual fashions, and rants against the position of women in the art world.

Kraus began writing the book as a series of letters detailing her infatuation. She has stated that, in an obsessional four-week burst, she composed 200 pages of letters before realizing her obsession was with writing itself, not the recipient . This marked her transition from ‘failed’ filmmaker to successful writer. With the book, Kraus introduced her ‘Lonely Girl Phenomenology’ as a new genre, embracing insecurities and a fascination with failure as a means to frame the narrator's relentless romantic pursuit as a generative and creative act. Framing the book as a high-wire act of self-exposure, Kraus balanced the narrator's yearning with the empowerment she experienced through the performance of her abjection.

The book quickly gained a cult following among art communities upon its release in 1997 and found mainstream success in 2006, when a new edition introduced by Eileen Myles connected with a new generation of readers. Myles characterized Kraus's fusion of fiction, autobiography, and criticism as a successful turning of the tables: ‘Not on a particular guy, ‘Dick,' but on that smug impervious observing culture’— 'the male host culture,’ which she forces ‘to listen to her describe the inside of those famous female feelings’.

Joanna Walsh, writing for the Guardian, stated: ‘Without her challenge to what [Kraus] called “the ‘serious’ contemporary hetero-male novel... a thinly veiled Story of Me”, Sheila Heti might never have asked How Should a Person Be?, and Ben Lerner might never have written Leaving the Atocha Station. A whole generation of writers owes her’.

John Douglas Miller, in The White Review, described it as ‘clear prose capable of theoretical clarity, descriptive delicacy, articulate rage and melancholic longing’. Emily Gould, writing for the Guardian, called it ‘The most important book about men and women written in the last century’.

==== Aliens and Anorexia (2000) ====
Kraus’ second novel has been described as "a tantalizing, messy, wildly associative and often brilliant book that leaps effortlessly between autobiography, art criticism, philosophy and fiction," according to LA Weekly. It interweaves threads about Simone Weil, Ulrike Meinhof, and Paul Thek with S&M phone chats and her own experiences of failing to find a distributor for her feature film, Gravity & Grace. Kraus encompasses a range of subjects, posing her own subjective perspective as a lens through which to make sense of wider female and artistic experiences. Drawing on Deleuze's assertion that ‘life is not personal’, she uses her own personal ‘I’ to write about subjects other than, as well as herself, framing empathy as a central perceptive tool. Reclaiming the personal ‘I’ as ‘universal and transparent’, Kraus presents her subjects as case studies of sadness, failure, and hope, echoing and projecting her own experiences to address the human condition, creating an autobiographical feedback loop as she documents her struggle to make art from her life.

Critics praised the novel for its intellectual scope and emotional depth. Ben Ehrenreich wrote in the L.A. Weekly, ‘There are more ideas on every page of Aliens & Anorexia than in most books published in the last year. It is an exciting and courageous work’. Katie Goh of The Skinny described it as covering 'a kaleidoscope of subjects with empathy, vulnerability and wit’.

==== Torpor (2006) ====
Kraus’ third novel follows Jerome and Sylvie, two former New Yorkers traveling across the former Soviet Bloc with the aim of adopting a Romanian orphan. As they approach impoverished Romania, Jerome's memories of his father's extermination at Auschwitz and his own childhood survival impede them. Kraus has described Torpor as ‘much more personal than the other two books’ and ironically employs a distanced, third-person perspective to explore the nature of trauma tied to her ex-husband's survivor experience of being hidden in France as a child during the Second World War The third-person perspective allows Kraus to write about her younger avatar, Sylvie, with greater separation and objectivity, affording insight and wisdom through the standpoint of her older self.

Near the beginning, the book describes its own formal strategy, employing parataxis to flash ‘back and sideways’ through the story, fracturing it into multiple and often contradictory perspectives. Throughout the book, as Sylvie and Jerome struggle to separate themselves from the past, the universal is reflected in the particular through ‘pettiness of their domestic squabbles juxtaposed with historical trauma’. By presenting recurring consciousness from different angles, Kraus refuses to resolve the material into a single, coherent narrative.

In line with the previous books in the trilogy, Torpor revisits themes of poverty and feminism. In one scene, Sylvie meets a Romanian poet on an identical scholarship to Jerome's, and the narrator observes that the woman is ‘conscientious and intelligent, she is a good-girl academic: the kind of woman Jerome dislikes most... Jerome dislikes most of his female colleagues because they take their work so seriously, and he despises academe’. Anna Poletti notes that this idea of a ‘distinctly female sin of taking one's work too seriously’ is explored throughout Kraus’ work, particularly in the reworking of her film practice in the novels.

Critics have highlighted the book's tone and relevance. Becca Rothfeld wrote: ‘As fresh today as it was when it first came out, Torpor joins Twitter personalities like NeinQuarterly and So Sad Today to resist the cult of relentless positivity, cultivating a much-needed counter-aesthetics of despair’. Vanity Fair said, ‘Torpor concerns itself with a feminist filmmaker consumed and confounded by the intellect and desire of a rapacious philosopher-lover. It's personalized and smart with open thought and independent energy’.

==== Summer of Hate (2012) ====
Summer of Hate is a novel about the risks and limitations of new dreams, the prison-industrial complex in America, and George W. Bush’s s 'dark flipside of the American Dream, recording recent events through the prism of a beleaguered romance. The story begins in 2005, with Catt on the run from Nicholas Cohen, a dominant she met on a BDSM website. She travels to Albuquerque to reinvest windfall real-estate gains and reengage with something approximating ‘real life.’ There, she becomes romantically involved with Paul Garcia, a recently sober ex-con who has served sixteen months in state prison for defrauding Halliburton Industries, his former employer. With Catt's help, Paul plans to attend UCLA but is arrested en-route on a ten-year-old bench warrant.

The novel blends autobiography, philosophy, art writing, and social commentary with elements of the thriller genre. Kraus cites Patricia Highsmith as an influence, specifically her manipulation of time to create character and tension. While the book uses pacing to build tension and release during action scenes, it does not conform to conventional thriller structures such as a straightforward plot, instead blurring memoir and fiction with theoretical discursions. This approach creates, according to Hestia Peppe, ‘a weirdness and discomfort that is at once so interestingly and realistically rendered that it's as if the novel is willing to have imperfection in order to be uniquely itself’. Kraus's rejection of marketing expectations reflects her maneuvering within the artistic freedoms at the periphery of the mainstream publishing circuit.

At its core, Summer of Hate presents a role reversal: Catt, the lead protagonist, is now a successful artist, with Paul as the ‘plus one’ and outsider. This shift reflects Kraus’ previous incarnations as the struggling partner of a successful academic. This shift offers a perspective of the art world looking outward, applying critical insight into the U.S. social justice system and addiction, with Paul's experiences serving as a lens through which to critique wider social issues.

Critical reception praised the novel's scope and ambition. Wendy Vogel wrote in the Brooklyn Rail: ‘Summer of Hate is commendable for not only taking up the mantle of sexualized female subjectivity, but for its narrative of exploration the real psychic underbelly of the elite art world: the experience of the disenfranchised and the incarcerated, and the limits of a social system that imposes ever greater disparities between classes’. Artforum included it in its ‘Best of 2012’ list, with Travis Jeppesen calling it ‘the most definitive novel of the Bush Years we’re likely to get’. Keith Gessen described the novel as ‘like watching a car crash happen in slow motion. Very few writers are as intelligent and honest as Kraus—and no one sees so clearly’.

==== After Kathy Acker (2017) ====
This was the first fully authorized biography of Kathy Acker, an avant-garde writer, mythical artist, and self-styled cultural icon. Kraus explores in Acker's work an aesthetics of provocation, discomfiture, risk, and radical empathy. Kraus approached her subject as a writer and member of the artistic communities from which they both emerged, drawing on extensive archival research, personal interviews and ongoing conversations with mutual friends and acquaintances.

Having known Acker personally and been part of the same circles, including relationships with Sylvère Lotringer at different times, Kraus sought to establish a critical distance from her subject and to write from an objective standpoint. Initially approached to write an academic monograph on Acker, Kraus realized that she had found the appropriate form for a biography she had unconsciously been researching for years. Writing the book as a critical biography allowed Kraus to achieve the necessary distance to bring readers closer to her subject. Departing from the style of her previous novels, the biography employs a dominant, clear, and even-handed style distinct from Kraus’ fiction, where she often features as a character or avatar with a mercurial presence.

In a review of Jason McBride's 2022 Acker biography Eat Your Mind, Dwight Garner noted that ‘Kraus is a powerfully original writer, and her book is quirkier. She knew Acker, for good and ill, and there is a jousting sense of rivalry’. Olivia Laing noted in her Guardian review that ‘Kraus’ interest in making hidden structures visible made it surprising that in the book itself she didn't acknowledge her relationship to the subject’. The book reflects Kraus's relationship to Acker, both personally and artistically, through the indirect method of using italics to cite Acker's work, creating a co-mingling of the words of both writers. This approach reflects Acker's own appropriative style, in which she adopted the voices of other writers and combined them with original writing—a practice associated with postmodern pastiche and appropriation—to illustrate a fractured and associative sense of identity. Holland Cotter, in his New York Times article ‘The Best Art Books of 2017’, praised Kraus as 'one of our most innovative art critics, who is also one of our best fiction writers, now becomes one of our more adventurous biographers’.

Anna Poletti highlighted the book's avoidance of hagiography, noting that Kraus 'generously reads the strengths and weaknesses of Acker's oeuvre' and offers a compelling portrait of Acker's rigorous writing practice. Sheila Heti described it as ‘gossipy, anti-mythic artist biography which feels like it's being told in one long rush of a monologue over late-night drinks by someone who was there’.

==== The Four Spent the Day Together (2025) ====
The Four Spent the Day Together is a novel that combines autofiction and true crime, following writer Cat Greene as she travels between Connecticut, Los Angeles, and Minnesota. It can be read as a standalone follow-up to Summer of Hate, among other recent novels, featuring similar material and thematic tentpoles. The novel is broken into three distinct parts, each of which presents a different phase of Greene's arc, which includes a devastatingly unreformed alcoholic partner. When Greene begins to follow a murder case that occurred in the small Minnesota town where she often holes up in a lake house, she unveils a community broken apart by meth, a generation tormented by nihilism, and the desperate grasp for connection made in the space between. In Greene's attempt to understand the murder, and her own unraveling relationship, she looks back to her esoteric childhood in Connecticut and the yawning space between the rich and poor, truth and delusion. Kraus is said to have been influenced by Hinterland by Phil A. Neel. Dwight Garner, of The New York Times, writes that the novel "contains one of the most sensitive and intricate portraits of alcoholism I’ve read in a long time — the joy and dread that accompanies slipping into old vices."

Throughout the book, Greene grapples with newfound literary fame that came with the public rediscovery of her early novel I Love Dick, true to Kraus's own experience publishing I Love Dick, which became widely known only after it was republished in 2006. This book also marks the first time Kraus had written about her own complex childhood, even in veiled manner. When Greene, Kraus's narrator, is outed as the owner of several rental properties, as Kraus is, Greene is harangued on Twitter, with a literary figure tweeting "Catt Greene is a landlord." This mirrors Kraus's own experience of being attacked on Twitter for renting properties, notably from the Red Scare podcast host Dasha Nekrasova.

In an interview with Jennifer Wilson in The New Yorker, in 2025, Kraus called Greene "my avatar." Of her own experience maintaining a relationship with a relapsed addict, which she worked to convey in the book, Kraus claims, "It really is like a boiling frog. When you’re living through that experience you start to differentiate between the person and the addict. Things that are completely inexcusable, you write off to the addiction—but that means negating your own experience." After her own tumultuous relationship with the addict represented by the character Paul, Kraus has said, "One of my goals in this book was to be as candid and vulnerable as I could be about that experience, because I think people who are living with it really need to have it affirmed."

=== Art/Cultural Criticism ===
==== Video Green: Los Angeles Art and the Triumph of Nothingness (2004) ====
Video Green is a collection of essays written by Kraus between 1998 and 2003, after she moved to Los Angeles from New York and found herself in the middle of its burgeoning art scene. The essays emerged from Kraus’ attempts to understand this new context by exploring the relationship between individual artists and the politics and values of the art world at large. The book examines the explosion of late 1990s Los Angeles art, driven by high-profile graduate programs, and probes the surface of art-critical buzzwords of the time. Kraus chronicles how Los Angeles suddenly became an epicenter of the international art world and a microcosm of larger cultural dynamics.

As with her fiction, Kraus's protean voice extends to her essays and art criticism, where she filters her experience of the work through her presence as an active participant, aiming to become the 'best possible audience'. Her essays frequently explore themes such as the contexts in which society permits artists to use their lives as primary material. They also include references to Kraus's personal experiences as an artist and writer, intertextual references to her novels, and scenes revisited from different perspectives, further complicating the interplay of truth and fiction in her work.

Emily Kuenstler, writing for Afterimage, observed that ’Kraus’ nerve is breathtaking, as she lacerates, observes or cajoles out of hiding reactionary art school faculty and self-congratulatory administrators’.

Publishers Weekly praised the collection as ‘Idiosyncratic, scattered and compelling,” calling Kraus' perspective on Los Angeles and its art 'decidedly and wonderfully nonstandard’. Tamar Brott, in Los Angeles Magazine, likened Kraus to a heightening version of Joan Didion, writing ’Like all the great chroniclers of Los Angeles, Chris Kraus observes the city's emptiness, possibility and hallucination of meaning. But Kraus is Joan Didion cubed, writing herself into the narrative of the city’.

==== Where Art Belongs (2011) ====
In Where Art Belongs, Kraus examines artistic enterprises of the past decade that reclaim the use of lived time as a material in the creation of visual art. Comprising four interlinked essays, the book expands the argument from Video Green that ‘the art world is interesting only insofar as it reflects the larger world outside it.’

Moving from New York to Berlin to Los Angeles to the Pueblo Nuevo barrio of Mexicali, Kraus addresses subjects such as the ubiquity of video, the legacy of Amsterdam's 1960s underground newspaper Suck, and the activities of New York art collective Bernadette Corporation. In one chapter, she examines the creativity of American Apparel founder Dov Charney, aligning his creative-corporate vision to the ethos of the 1960s artist collective Chia Jen. She examines how, in contemporary culture, corporations like Charney's can channel creative energy associated with art, thereby becoming a form of art themselves.

Where Art Belongs examines the trend toward collectivity in the visual art world over the past decade, as well as small-scale resistance to digital disembodiment and the hegemony of the entertainment, media, and culture industries. Kraus examines the uses of boredom, poetry, privatized prisons, community art, corporate philanthropy, vertically integrated manufacturing, and discarded utopias, highlighting the enduring role of microcultures within the matrix. In the book, art theory turns into a kind of political philosophy. By drawing parallels between the diminishment of the object as a commercial product and its disappearance from the work of art, art is shown as significant insofar as it remains a practice, not a product. This practice is presented as a way to establish a life beyond accepted capitalist norms.

The book is characteristic of Kraus’ style, with writing flows fluently between subjects, incorporating interjections, opinions, and asides. It lacks an intended plot, chronological connection, or apparent hierarchical distinction between autobiography and theory. As with her previous essay collection, Kraus maintains a greater distance than in her novels, but it is her sustained authorial presence, through which the meandering narrative is filtered, that unifies the form.

Ann Yoder, writing for The Millions, described Kraus's approach as 'more akin to a cultural anthropologist who considers creativity in its natural habitats, the spaces where art comes into being’. Janine Armin, reviewing for BookForum, wrote ‘Kraus is searingly aware of the discourse in which she functions, and transforms it into something redolent of Simone Weil's poeticism and its daunting theoretical undercurrents’.

==== Social Practices (2018) ====
Comprising work written over a period of thirteen years, Social Practices is a collection of essays, diary entries, interviews, obituaries and personal experiences. Throughout the book, Kraus introduces readers to a wide variety of artists across a breadth of media, timeframes, and locales.

The book is written in Kraus’ distinctive style of art writing, which is conversational and critical, engaged yet incisive, with elements of chance, memory, and travel animating each entry. Kraus states that the title Social Practices is both a joke and a statement, acknowledging that art always involves some kind of social practice, while also attempting to redeem the phrase from the ‘prissy genre it's come to connote’. The book is partly an exploration of how the educational structures that support social practice engender critical thinking, ethical acts, and formalized processes. It is also concerned with how, paradoxically, when released from institutional bounds, artists go into the world and try to change it. In line with her wider body of work, the book revisits themes like the coexistence of conflicting power structures, the interaction between mainstream culture and those realizing art on the fringes, often positioning identification with the edges as a strategy for dealing with white male power. Apparently not content with merely addressing such issues from a purely objective stance, Kraus seeks to involve herself in the continuing dialogue between art and culture, making her contribution through the course of these conversations. As Kraus states in the introduction, ‘The only difference between these pieces and traditional art criticism was that they were written more to the work than about it’.

Jennifer Kabat, for Frieze, wrote, ‘Kraus has led the way creating new paths for arts writing and critical thinking, not from wielding a cudgel but exposing our bruises, from being bruised herself and willing to show it’.

== Films ==
=== In Order to Pass (1982–83) ===
This film was recorded on Super 8 and handles themes of the limitations of remembrance and subjectivity. Scrolling text obsesses over the act of remembering, exploring the relationship between history and the survival of culture, and how this tension moves beyond the structuralist anxiety of medium. In one intertitle, which interrupts footage of a group of artists in the woods, Kraus writes: ‘The fantasizer locates the ideal state but then uses the imagination to create a progression into the present and future', presenting reality as a constant state of transition. The title itself has been interpreted as a guide to understanding Kraus’ artistic drive, characterized as a passing through, with the artist's subjectivity serving as the conductor for all that runs through it, eventually spilling into the work. The film echoes a recurring theme in Kraus’ oeuvre: artistic failure, and the insistence on continuing to make and exhibit art despite the knowledge of this failure.

=== Terrorists in Love (1983) ===
The film opens with a young woman reading a manifesto to a small crowd in a bar, and progresses to scenes of an imaginary boat on a hillside. Philosophical voice-overs periodically delve into abject and sadomasochistic themes. Adopting a feminist perspective, Kraus melts theoretical critique into ironic jokes about its pretensions, followed by genre-bending scenes set to musical interludes.

=== Voyage to Rodez (1985) ===
Voyage to Rodez was co-written and directed with Lotringer. It takes the form of a documentary, recounting an episode in Antonin Artaud's life. As with Kraus’ earlier play I Talked About God with Antonin Artaud, the film features material adapted from interviews Lotringer conducted with Artaud's doctors between 1983 and 1985.

=== Foolproof Illusion (1986) ===
Foolproof illusion was co-written and directed with Lotringer. The writings of Antonin Artaud's Theatre of Cruelty are strained through a feminist lens. Suzan Cooper stars as an Artaud clone. As Kraus recalls in an interview, ‘She wears bondage regalia and ‘lectures’ to his Columbia students about Antonin Artaud, telling stories about her ‘relationship’ with him and reaching an essence of madness that eludes most Artaud scholars. Louise Bourgeois had that same madness, an ability to access the heart of something’.

The late poet David Rattray reads from his translations of Artaud while the abjectness is literalized in scenes that explore the emotional and intellectual complexity of power exchange and its inherently theatrical nature, sometimes to the point of comedic absurdity. Midway through, a character depicted by Kraus delivers a monologue about her relationship to sadomasochism while wearing a ridiculously oversized wig, lending a farcical element that offsets the serious nature of the work.

=== How to Shoot a Crime (1987) ===
The film, co-written and directed with Lotringer, explores themes of gentrification, urban rootlessness, and the memorialization of a city through crime scene investigation. The film was shot on Super 8 by East Village filmmaker, Marion Scemema. It has been described as a ‘poetic take on sex and death’ and ‘luridly intellectual’. The footage features crime photographer Johnny Santiago giving a tour of New York homicide scenes, and Lotringer interviewing dominatrixes Mademoiselle Victoire and Terence Sellars about sadomasochism. He also interviews police videographer George Diaz about filming crimes for the NYPD.

The interviews were largely unstructured, allowing the participants to speak freely and producing some unexpected results. At one point, Terence, a seasoned dominatrix with control and intimacy issues, states, ‘You have to be sensitive to people in order to be shitty to them’, unwittingly illustrating the duality of logic and emotion. Later, Lotringer and Terence get into a spat, with Lotringer asking Terence why she has to be right all the time, to which Terence exclaims, ‘Twenty years from now there's only going to be this videotape of me when I'm thirty years old, talking’. At that moment, Kraus noted, ‘you see her taking herself seriously as an artist, in a way that escapes him’. Kraus states that the movie became a conflation of the symbolic violence of MTV-style pop S&M and the actual violence that George was documenting. Even more disturbingly, she said, the crime scenes became viewed as a form of mourning – ‘the careful documentation of certain deaths within an otherwise wholly anonymous urban landscape’.

=== The Golden Bowl or Repression (1984–88) ===
This film was partly inspired by the Henry James novel The Golden Bowl and has been described as ‘surreal noir’. It takes place in a setting of empty rooms and well-kept gardens, blending James’ twisted interlocutions with a mood of post-punk ennui. Viewed as a reportage on the dark landscapes of urban America, Nan Goldin has noted it for its dissections of ‘romance, mystification and the inability to connect’.

=== Traveling at Night (1980) ===
Traveling at Night is about a field trip to a deconsecrated Wesleyan Methodist Church in Darrowsville, New York.

=== Sadness at Leaving (1992) ===
Sadness at Leaving is based on Erje Ayden's 1987 autobiographical novel of the same name, about his time as a Turkish spy.

=== Gravity & Grace (1996) ===
Kraus’ last film, Gravity and Grace, is her only feature-length production. The film takes its name from a compilation of writings by mystic philosopher Simone Weil and follows its titular characters, Gravity and Grace, through their time in a New Zealand-based cult. It toggles between ‘mainstream aesthetics, underground spunk, and art-world pseudo-intellectualism’ and has been described as ‘a record of the competing forces at play for many artists’. While Grace happily stays on with the group, a disaffected Gravity goes on to become an artist in New York City, where she, in keeping with Kraus's oeuvre, fails. During the course of this failure she ends up as dissatisfied by the art world as she was the cult.

An almost self-referential sense of parody runs through one of the final scenes when Gravity meets with a curator at the New Museum who describes her work as ‘neither abject nor sublime,’ pontificating on Gravity's media and work as ‘not shitty enough’ for the contemporary moment. Gravity exclaims, ‘My work is made out of garbage!’.

Her later novel Aliens & Anorexia, in an autobiographical loop typical of Kraus, uses the commercial and critical failure of Gravity and Grace as its narrative starting point.

== Plays ==
=== Scenes From an (Almost) Socialist Marriage (1978) ===
Kraus’ debut play, co-written and rehearsed with Suzan Cooper over nine months, premiered at The Performing Garage, New York. It was directed by Richard Schechner, with a flyer designed by Louise Bourgeois. Kraus starred as ‘Chris Class,’ and Cooper played ‘Suzan Socialist’.

=== 824 Car Chase (1979) ===
This play was co-written and performed at the St. Mark's Poetry Project with Suzan Cooper and directed by Louise Bourgeois.

=== Disparate Action/Desperate Action (1980) ===
After moving to New York in 1980, Kraus wrote Disparate Action/Desperate Action as ‘a response to arriving from New Zealand, where you more or less know who is making decisions, to a polarized situation where action can only ever be symbolic’. Performed by Kraus and Tom Yemm, directed by Nancy Reilly with assistance from Gale Pike, the play was a reflection on ‘political imagery and personal experience’. The play conflated the character of Ulrike Meinhof with Dorothea Brooke from George Eliot’s Middlemarch. A didactic political commentary introduced the show as a meeting-hall lecture, with other parts of the presentation focusing on the interactions between the characters Joe and Susie. The repetitiveness and banality of Susie and Joe's concerns with money and their boredom underscored Kraus's commentary on the commodity of sex in society as their interactions were laden with imagery of sexual control. Susie, an objectified woman defined by her representation rather than her agency, was contrasted with Ulrike Meinhof, the German middle-class journalist-turned-terrorist who took action against a complacent society.

=== Things Happen But They Change (1981) ===
Part of a series funded by the New York State Council for Humanities, the play was written and directed by Kraus with retired members of the SEIU. It premiered at ReCherChez in New York.

=== Readings from the Diaries of Hugo Ball (1984) ===
This performance piece was based on the lives of Hugo Ball and his companion Emmy Hennings, who spent their lives traveling around Europe ‘making art without any validation or career plans’. Focused on Zurich Dada, the text was drawn from Ball's diaries, later published as Flight out of Time. The play was written, directed, and co-performed by Kraus and staged at the Monday Night series at St. Mark's Poetry Project, Performance Space 122, in the East Village of Manhattan.

Kraus, assuming the identity of Gabi Teisch from the Alexander Kluge movie The Patriot, played the role of hostess, delivering exposition while the characters in the play spoke their parts. Referencing Teisch, a German history teacher unhappy with the present who turns to history to find out where it went wrong, Kraus embodied a role that challenged historical and normative narratives.

Kraus played the role of an affable, informative host, pointing out Ball's travels on a Fauvist map of Europe. Flanking her were two tables with four 'panellists' who took turns reading selections from the diary: Daryl Chin on politics, Phil Auslander on theater, Danny Krakauer on being German and shy, and Susie Timmons. Michael Kirby wore a replica of a costume Ball had performed in, created by Kay Spurlock. Linda Hartinian stood on a chair, blindfolded, wearing a white blouse and black skirt, as she 'read' Hennings' foreword to the diaries while turning the pages. The music, composed by Chris Abajian, was a lyrical spoof of cabaret music in twelve-tone style.

=== I Talked About God with Antonin Artaud (1984) ===
This performance was derived from material gathered by Lotringer during an interview with Dr. Jacques Latrémolière, the assistant psychiatrist who administered shock therapy to Antonin Artaud and talked about God with him at the asylum in Rodez, in the South of France, in the mid-1940s.

The play was co-written and produced by Kraus and Lotringer, directed by Kraus, and debuted at St. Mark's Poetry Project. The performance featured Lotringer having his head shaved on stage. Material from Lotringer's interviews with Artaud's doctors has since been featured in various performances, plays and films, including Mad Like Artaud and Voyage to Rodez.

== Events ==
=== Chance: Three Days in the Desert ===
In November 1996, a year after leaving New York for Los Angeles, Kraus produced and curated Chance: Three Days in the Desert, a three-day ‘philosophy rave’ at Whiskey Pete's Casino on the border of Nevada and California. It was billed as ‘a philosophical rave and summit meeting between artists and philosophers, chaosophists and croupiers, mathematicians and musicians’. The event brought together Jean Baudrillard, Rosanne Alluquere Stone, DJ Spooky, Diane di Prima, the Moapa Band of Paiute Indians, visual artists, garage noise bands, and 600 participants to investigate the mystery of chance. The event, funded by the French Cultural Service and Art Center College of Design, was considered instrumental in establishing Los Angeles as a new artistic center in the mid-1990s.

== Bibliography ==
=== Books ===
- I Love Dick, 1997 (Semiotext(e) / Native Agents). ISBN 9781584350347
- Aliens and Anorexia, 2000 (Semiotext(e) / Native Agents). ISBN 9781584351269
- Video Green: Los Angeles Art and the Triumph of Nothingness, 2004 (Semiotext(e) / Active Agents). ISBN 9781584350224
- Torpor, 2006 (Semiotext(e) / Native Agents). ISBN 9781584350279
- Where Art Belongs, 2011 (Semiotext(e) / Intervention Series). ISBN 9781584350989
- Summer of Hate, 2012 (Semiotext(e) / Native Agents). ISBN 9781584351139
- After Kathy Acker: A Biography, 2017 (Allen Lane). ISBN 978-0241318058
- Social Practices, 2018 (Semiotext(e) / Active Agents). ISBN 9781635900392
- The Four Spent the Day Together, 2025 (Scribner). ISBN 978-1-6680-9868-4

=== Films ===
- In Order to Pass (1982–83), 30 minutes, Super8 film/video.
- Terrorists in Love (1983), 5 minutes, Super8 film/video.
- Voyage to Rodez (1985) - co-wrote and directed with Sylvère Lotringer, 14 minutes, 16mm film.
- Foolproof Illusion (1986) - co-wrote and directed with Sylvère Lotringer, 17 minutes, video.
- How to Shoot a Crime (1987) - co-wrote and directed with Sylvère Lotringer, 28 minutes, video.
- The Golden Bowl or Repression (1984–88), 12 minutes, 16mm film.
- Traveling at Night (1990), 14 minutes, video.
- Sadness at Leaving (1992), 20 minutes, 16mm film.
- Gravity & Grace (1996), 88 minutes, Lonely Girl Films (New Zealand/USA/Canada).

=== Plays ===
- Scenes From an (almost) Socialist Marriage (1978) - co-wrote and co-performed with Suzan Cooper, directed by Richard Schechner.
- 824 Car Chase (1979) - co-wrote and co-performed with Suzan Cooper, directed by Louise Bourgeois.
- Disparate Action/Desperate Action (1980) - wrote and co-performed with Tom Yemm, directed by Nancy Reilly.
- Things Happen But They Change (1981) - writer/director, ReCherChez.
- Readings From the Diaries of Hugo Ball (1984) - writer/director, PS 122.
- I Talked About God With Antonin Artaud (1984) - co-wrote with Sylvère Lotringer, director, St. Mark's Poetry Project.
