= Semiotext(e) =

American independent publisher of literature

- Semiotext(e), Vol. 2 No. 2, issue on Georges Bataille (1976)
- Founded: 1974
- Founder: Sylvère Lotringer
- Country of origin: United States
- Headquarters location: Los Angeles
- Distribution: MIT Press
- Key people: Hedi El Kholti, Chris Kraus, Sylvère Lotringer
- Publication types: Books, magazines, pamphlets
- Imprints: Active Agents, Foreign Agents, Intervention Series, Native Agents and Animal Shelter
- Official website: semiotextes.com

Semiotext(e) is an independent publisher of critical theory, fiction, philosophy, art criticism, activist texts and non-fiction.

== History ==
Founded in 1974, Semiotext(e) began as a journal that emerged from a semiotics reading group led by Sylvère Lotringer at the Columbia University philosophy department. Initially, the magazine was devoted to readings of thinkers like Nietzsche and Saussure. In 1978, Lotringer and his collaborators published a special issue, Schizo-Culture, in the wake of a conference of the same name he had organized two years before at Columbia University. The magazine brought together writers, artists, and thinkers such as Gilles Deleuze, Kathy Acker, John Cage, Michel Foucault, Jack Smith, Martine Barrat and Lee Breuer. Schizo-Culture brought out connections between "high theory" and underground culture that had not yet been made, and forged the "high/low" aesthetic that remains central to the Semiotext(e) project.

As the group dispersed over time, issues appeared less frequently. In 1980, Lotringer began to assemble the Foreign Agents series, a group of "little black books", often culled from longer texts, to polemically debut the work of French theorists to US readers. He was aided in this by Jim Fleming, whose collective press Autonomedia would be Semiotext(e)'s distributor for the next twenty-one years. Jean Baudrillard’s Simulations was the first of these books to appear, followed by titles by Gilles Deleuze, Felix Guattari, Paul Virilio, Jean-François Lyotard and Michel Foucault, among others. Spin magazine cited the little black books as "Objects of Desire" in a 19XX design feature.

In 1990, Chris Kraus proposed a new series of fiction books by American writers, which would become the Native Agents imprint. Kraus worked at the St. Marks Poetry Project and saw an overlap between the theories of subjectivity advanced in the Foreign Agents books and the radical subjectivity practiced by female first-person fiction writers. Designed to promote an anti-memoiristic "public I", the series published Kathy Acker, Barbara Barg, Cookie Mueller, Eileen Myles, David Rattray, Ann Rower, Lynne Tillman and many others.

A third series, Active Agents, began in 1993 with the publication of Still Black Still Strong by Dhoruba Bin Wahad, Assata Shakur and Mumia Abu-Jamal, with the goal of presenting explicitly political, topical material. It has also published texts by Kate Zambreno, Bruce Hainley, and Eileen Myles.

In 2001 Semiotext(e) changed its base of operations from New York City to Los Angeles, ceasing its involvement with Autonomedia to begin an ongoing distribution arrangement with MIT Press. Jim Fleming of Autonomedia discussed this split in a 2024 interview as "acrimonious," and has resulted in Fleming's "[erasure] from the official history of Semiotext(e)." Hedi El Kholti, the Moroccan-born artist and writer who co-founded the now-defunct Dilettante Press, became Semiotext(e)’s art director. As the decade progressed, El Kholti saw a need to re-imagine the Semiotext(e) project beyond the small-format books of the series. Earlier titles would be republished as large-format books within the new History of the Present imprint.

In 2004, El Kholti became managing editor of the press. He, Kraus and Lotringer then became joint, list-wide co-editors. Semiotext(e)'s new goal was to advance its original conflation of literature and theory, and to expand the anti-bourgeois queer theory presented in early issues of the Semiotext(e) journal.

The purview of Native Agents expanded to include science fiction books by Maurice Dantec and Mark von Schlegell and works by writers like Tony Duvert, Pierre Guyotat, Travis Jeppesen, Grisélidis Real, Bruce Benderson, and Abdellah Taïa. Aware that the theorists he introduced in the 1980s had by now been absorbed into the academic mainstream, Sylvère Lotringer turned his attention to Italy's post-Autonomia critical theory, commissioning and publishing works by Franco 'Bifo' Berardi, Paolo Virno, Antonio Negri, Christian Marazzi [fr], Maurizio Lazzarato and others. Semiotext(e) also became the English-language publisher for Peter Sloterdijk’s notable Spheres trilogy. Re-visioning New York's ‘last avant-garde’ of the 1980s, Semiotext(e) published archival works by or about some of that era's most important artists, including Penny Arcade, Gary Indiana and David Wojnarowicz.

Semiotext(e) was invited to participate as an artist in the 2014 Whitney Biennial, for which it produced twenty-eight pamphlets by writers and artists associated with the press. These included "new, commissioned works by Franco “Bifo" Berardi, John Kelsey, Chris Kraus, Eileen Myles, Ariana Reines, and Abdellah Taïa, among others, and previously unpublished texts by such influential twentieth-century figures as Simone Weil, Julio Cortazar, and Jean Baudrillard."

== Semiotext(e) Intervention Series ==
Semiotext(e) publishes the Intervention Series (2009—present), an ongoing series of short books on subjects related to left-wing politics. Topics of the series include anti-capitalism, anti-authoritarianism, post-structuralism, feminism, and economics. All books in the series are designed by Hedi El Kholti. The series is notable for its first installment: The Coming Insurrection by The Invisible Committee, a French pseudonymous author (or authors). Upon its release, the book was condemned by American conservative commentator Glenn Beck, who described it as a dangerous radical leftist manifesto. The Coming Insurrection is also known for its association with the legal case of the Tarnac Nine, a group of nine people, including Julien Coupat, who were arrested in Tarnac, rural France, on November 11, 2008, on suspicion of sabotaging French railways. The method of sabotage actually used was similar to one suggested in the book, and members of the group were suspected to be members of the Invisible Committee. Coupat later co-founded Tiqqun, a short-lived philosophical magazine whose work is also represented in the Intervention Series.

Major topics of the series include French anarchism (The Invisible Committee, Tiqqun), Italian Marxist economic criticism (Maurizio Lazzarato, Franco Berardi, Christian Marazzi (Note: Marazzi is a Swiss national, living and working in the Swiss Italian region of Switzerland, and has previously taught at the University of Padua in Italy.)) and violence in the context of the Mexican drug war (Sergio González Rodríguez, Sayak Valencia). Other topics discussed include art history (Gerald Raunig, Chris Kraus), racism and the criminal justice system (Houria Bouteldja, Jackie Wang), continental philosophy (Jean Baudrillard, Peter Sloterdijk), and contemporary culture (François Cusset, Jennifer Doyle, Paul Virilio).

Although the series treats a variety of subjects in left-wing politics and culture, there are also commonalities and through-lines among the works. Several of the series' entries address the 2008 financial crisis and the consequent protest movements of the early 21st century, particularly Occupy Wall Street and the Arab Spring; these are compared by several of the series' authors with the French protests of May 1968 and the Italian Years of lead. (Note: "The insurrections have come, finally. At such a pace and in so many countries, since 2008, that the whole structure of this world seems to be disintegrating, piece by piece.") (Note: "On several occasions over the course of the 1970s the insurrectionary situation in Italy threatened to spread to France... It is thus easier to understand why the French speak of a 'creeping May' when it comes to Italy. They have the proud, public May, the state May. In Paris May 68 has served as the symbol of '60s and '70s world political antagonism to the exact extent that the reality of this antagonism lies elsewhere.") (Note: "In 2011, the Occupy movement protested the submission of social life to semio-capital. As widespread as Occupy was, the movement was a political failure.") In the context of these protest movements, authors in the series describe a tendency to refuse to seize political power, thus also refusing to engage with states, businesses, and traditional power entities in expected ways. This refusal of power is also described as "destituent". (Note: "What was unforgivable about May '68 rebels or about the Autonomia movement at its peak in 1977 is that they did not want to take power. Franco Piperno, one of their leaders, admitted to me later on: 'We didn't know what we would have done with it.' As Baudrillard writes in The Agony of Power: 'Power itself must be abolished—and not solely because of a refusal to be dominated, which is at the heart of all traditional struggles—but also, just as violently, in the refusal to dominate.") (Note: "Can we really change the world or real life for everyone without taking political and economic power? That was the large question mark floating above the planet at the turn of the millennium. For some, the way forward was to transform minds and ways of being through new lateral solidarities, online media, and the principles of intellectual equality and collective intelligence. For those who were wary of surges of disempowerment or a politics that had its head in the clouds, the solution was instead the creation of organized alternative communities, the secession of entire neighborhoods in large cities and in remote rural areas, a kind of separatism that accepted its frontal opposition to power, not aiming to seize it but instead to constantly defy it, and to 'depose' it by all possible means and stratagems. Indeed, according to one of its theoreticians, this new emancipative power saw itself as a destituent rather than a constituent power.") (Note: "Thus, where the 'constituents' place themselves in a dialectial relation of struggle with the ruling authority to take possession of it, destituent logic obeys the vital need to disengage from it. It doesn't abandon the struggle, it fastens on to the struggle's positivity.") Twentieth-century continental philosophy is frequently cited by the series' authors, particularly the work of Deleuze and Guattari, Michel Foucault, and Giorgio Agamben. (Note: "In his important book on neoliberalism, The Birth of Biopolitics, Foucault, setting aside what had argued in the course mentioned above on the functions of money in ancient Greece, neglects the functions of finance, debt, and money, even though these constituted the strategic mechanisms of neoliberal government starting in the late 1970s.") (Note: "Deleuze and Guattari, in A Thousand Plateaus, try to define fascism, and they say: fascism is when a war machine is hidden in every niche, when in every nook and in every cranny of daily life a war machine is hidden. This is fascism. So I would say that neoliberalism is the most perfect form of fascism, in terms of Deleuze and Guattari's definition.") (Note: "The 'Postscript on the Societies of Control' is probably Gilles Deleuze's most famous essay. Almost as though in a manifesto, the French philosopher summarizes here the theses of his friend Michel Foucault on confinement (and on its crisis, agony and what follows from that).") Several of the series' authors decry the state of exception, a legal theory attributed to the German jurist Carl Schmitt (and later criticized and further theorized by Agamben as well as Achille Mbembe), which posits that the state has authority to act outside the rule of law in extreme circumstances (e.g. a state of emergency) in the name of the public good. (Note: "With the exceptional antiterrorist legislation, the gutting of the labor laws, the increasing specialization of jurisdictions and courts of prosecution, the Law no longer exists. Take criminal law. On the pretext of antiterrorism and fighting 'organized criminality', what has taken shape from year to year is the constitution of two distinct laws: a law for 'citizens' and a 'penal law of the enemy'.") (Note: "Just as the War on Terror had usefully shifted attention away from the new social struggles at the time, the attacks by the Islamic State in Europe in 2015–17 and the state of emergency that was instituted in France (the hardest-hit country) as a response offered convenient, literally diabolical (in the Greek sense of diabolos, to separate) diversions from the global social struggle that was in the process of being reborn.") (Note: "...we must question the rise of the global 'securitocracy', fundamentalist positions, the connection between war and entertainment and the increasing turn to states of 'emergency' or 'exception' or the 'law of the enemy' (or law outside the law).") Works in the series also criticize Richard Nixon's decision to remove the United States from the gold standard in 1971, (Note: "Nixon did something very, very important as far as changing the future went. Well, he decided to free the dollar from the gold standard.") (Note: "...a few discreet measures announcing a decisive evolution of the world economy (e.g. the end of the gold standard in 1971)...") and French television executive Patrick Le Lay who stated that his network's job was to sell Coca-Cola to its viewers via advertising, not provide content. (Note: "The most recent profession in a similar vein came from Patrick Le Lay, CEO of TF1, the French television channel: 'Let's be realistic: the job of TF1 is to help Coca-Cola sell its products. For an advertising campaign to work properly, the viewer's brains have to be accessible. The goal of our programs is to make them available, by entertaining them, relaxing them between two messages. What we sell to Coca-Cola is relaxed-brains time... Nothing is harder than getting them to open up.'") (Note: "But most importantly, attention has become the central object of the capitalist economy. It is what this economy is seeking to capture, much more so than natural resources, labor forces, or monetary capital. The phenomenon already existed with TV, as the CEO of a TV channel reminded us when he spoke of selling 'available brain time' to advertising agencies.")

The Semiotext(e) Intervention Series
| Number | Author | Title | Date | Summary |
|---|---|---|---|---|
| 1 (Note: Autonomia was a 1980 Semiotext(e) journal issue devoted to coverage of the 1970s Italian leftist Autonomia Operaia movement. The issue was reprinted as a book in 2007, bearing the phrase "semiotext(e) intervention series 1" on its front cover. The reprint of Autonomia was thus a prototype volume of the series. Proper entries in the series are much shorter, but frequently deal with the related subject matter of 1970s left-wing Italian movements.) | Various authors | Autonomia: Post-Political Politics | 1980/2007 | "The only first-hand document and contemporaneous analysis of the most innovative post-'68 radical movement in the West, the creative, futuristic, neo-anarchistic, postideological Autonomia." |
| 1 | The Invisible Committee | The Coming Insurrection | 2009 | "A call to arms by a group of French intellectuals that rejects leftist reform and aligns itself with younger, wilder forms of resistance." |
| 2 | Christian Marazzi [fr] | The Violence of Financial Capitalism | 2009/2011 | "An innovative analysis of financialization in the context of postfordist cognitive capitalism." New edition: "An updated edition of a groundbreaking work on the global financial crisis from a postfordist perspective." |
| 3 | Guy Hocquenghem | The Screwball Asses | 2009 | "A founder of queer theory contends that the ruling classes have invented homosexuality as a sexual ghetto, splitting and mutilating desire in the process." |
| 4 | Tiqqun | Introduction to Civil War | 2010 | "Activists explore the possibility that a new practice of communism may emerge from the end of society as we know it." |
| 5 | Gerald Raunig [de] | A Thousand Machines | 2010 | "The machine as a social movement of today's "precariat"—those whose labor and lives are precarious." |
| 6 | Jean Baudrillard | The Agony of Power | 2010 | "Baudrillard's unsettling coda: previously unpublished texts written just before the visionary theorist's death in 2007." |
| 7 | Tiqqun | This is Not a Program | 2011 | "An urgent critique of the biopolitical subject and omnipresent Empire." |
| 8 | Chris Kraus | Where Art Belongs | 2011 | "Chris Kraus examines artistic enterprises of the past decade that reclaim the use of lived time as a material in the creation of visual art." |
| 9 | Jarett Kobek | ATTA | 2011 | "A disorienting fictionalized portrayal of 9/11 mastermind Mohamed Atta and the meaning of madness." |
| 10 | Paul Virilio | The Administration of Fear | 2012 | "A new interview with the philosopher of speed, addressing the ways in which technology is utilized in synchronizing mass emotions." |
| 11 | Sergio González Rodríguez | The Femicide Machine | 2012 | "An account and analysis of the systematic murder of women and girls in the Mexican border town of Ciudad Juárez." |
| 12 | Tiqqun | Preliminary Materials for a Theory of the Young-Girl | 2012 | "A theoretical dissection of capitalism's ultimate form of merchandise: the living spectacle of the Young-Girl." |
| 13 | Maurizio Lazzarato | The Making of the Indebted Man | 2012 | "A new and radical reexamination of today's neoliberalist "new economy" through the political lens of the debtor/creditor relation." |
| 14 | Franco "Bifo" Berardi | The Uprising | 2012 | "A manifesto against the concepts of growth and debt, and a call for a reinvestment in the social body." |
| 15 | Gerald Raunig [de] | Factories of Knowledge, Industries of Creativity | 2013 | "With the economy deindustrialized and the working class decentralized, a call for alternative horizons for resistance: the university and the art world." |
| 16 | Peter Sloterdijk | Nietzsche Apostle | 2013 | "Peter Sloterdijk's essay on Friedrich Nietzsche and the benefits and dangers of narcissistic jubilation." |
| 17 | Maurizio Lazzarato | Governing by Debt | 2015 | "An argument that under capitalism, debt has become infinite and unpayable, expressing a political relation of subjection and enslavement." |
| 18 | The Invisible Committee | To Our Friends | 2015 | "A reflection on, and an extension of, the ideas laid out seven years ago in The Coming Insurrection." |
| 19 | Jennifer Doyle | Campus Sex, Campus Security | 2015 | "A clear-eyed critique of collegiate jurisprudence, as the process of administering student protests and sexual-assault complaints rolls along a Möbius strip of shifting legality." |
| 20 | Sergio González Rodríguez | The Iguala 43 | 2017 | "A well-researched and powerfully argued account of the disappearance of forty-three students and an analysis of the cruelty that normalizes atrocity." |
| 21 | Jackie Wang | Carceral Capitalism | 2018 | "Essays on the contemporary continuum of incarceration: the biopolitics of juvenile delinquency, predatory policing, the political economy of fees and fines, and algorithmic policing." |
| 22 | Houria Bouteldja [fr] | Whites, Jews, and Us | 2017 | "A scathing critique of the Left from an indigenous anti-colonial perspective." |
| 23 | The Invisible Committee | Now | 2017 | "A new political critique from the authors of The Coming Insurrection, calling for a 'destituent process' of outright refusal and utter indifference to government." |
| 24 | Sayak Valencia | Gore Capitalism | 2018 | "An analysis of contemporary violence as the new commodity of today's hyper-consumerist stage of capitalism." |
| 25 | François Cusset | How the World Swung to the Right | 2018 | "An examination of the reactionary, individualist, cynical, and belligerent shift in global politics to the right, implemented both by the right and the establishment left." |
| 26 | Franco "Bifo" Berardi | Breathing | 2019 | "The increasingly chaotic rhythm of our respiration, and the sense of suffocation that grows everywhere: an essay on poetical therapy." |
| 27 | Sergio González Rodríguez | Field of Battle | 2019 | "The emergence of a geopolitical war scenario, establishing a form of global governance that utilizes methods of surveillance and control." |
| 28 | Tiqqun | The Cybernetic Hypothesis | 2019 | "An early text from Tiqqun that views cybernetics as a fable of late capitalism, and offers tools for the resistance." |
| 29 | Maurizio Lazzarato | Capital Hates Everyone: Fascism or Revolution | 2021 | |

== See also ==
- French Theory
- Semiotext(e) SF

== Bibliography ==
- Sylvère Lotringer, "My 80s: Better Than Life," Artforum, April 2003
- Hedi El Kholti Chris Kraus Sylvère Lotringer: "SOMEWHERE IN THE UNFINISHED: The History of Semiotext(e) Part 2, Los Angeles,” Whitney Biennial Catalogue, Whitney Museum of Art, New York: 2014
