= French Theory =

Postmodern theoretical movement

French Theory refers to a body of postmodern philosophical, literary, and social theories. The term emerged in American universities and research work in the 1970s, from a school of thought born in the 1960s in France, and owes much, in terms of dissemination, to the journal Semiotext(e), founded by Sylvère Lotringer in 1974 at Columbia University.

French Theory met with particular enthusiasm in American humanities departments from the 1980s, where it contributed to the emergence of cultural studies, gender studies, and postcolonial studies. French Theory has also had a strong influence in the arts and in the activism world. The label "French theory" was applied in American academic research in the late 1970s; the term "post-structuralism" was used in relation to intellectual history, and "French postmodernism" was common among its detractors.

At the same time as the impact of the work of these French authors gave birth in the United States to an intellectual movement called French Theory, the names of the French philosophers involved were denigrated in France as "libidinal" and leftist. In the U.S., the theory faced considerable reluctancy and resistance, highlighted by the critiques of Camille Paglia and Alan Sokal (cf. Sokal affair and Fashionable Nonsense, co-authored with Jean Bricmont). Intellectual historian François Cusset argued that French Theory's recognition in North America owed more to its negative invocation in a political context by its detractors, than to its supporters in "a handful of departments of English and comparative literature."

== Name ==
According to Cusset, the grouping of these French authors in the US under the term French Theory appears highly artificial in France. This gathering in the same philosophical school erases the singularities and strong theoretical divergences of their respective works; their only similarities are their similar critical approaches:

- the critique of the subject, of representation and of historical continuity;
- rereading of Freud, Nietzsche and Heidegger;
- the criticism of the "critical" itself, that is, from the German philosophical tradition.

French Theory was born from the conjunction of several factors in the U.S., including:

- the "pre-existence" of intellectual or political currents, within American universities, whose theories were close or easily assimilated;
- Americanization, reorganization and de-contextualization of original French concepts;
- the transmission of ideas through specific modes of publication (excerpts published in academic and alternative journals rather than full translations of the works);
- the preponderance of cross-interviews between French authors (giving the impression of a homogeneous corpus);
- translation difficulties.

== Major figures ==
Authors associated with this movement include, France: Louis Althusser, Jean Baudrillard, Simone de Beauvoir, Roland Barthes, Hélène Cixous, Gilles Deleuze, Jacques Derrida, Michel Foucault, René Girard, Félix Guattari, Luce Irigaray, Julia Kristeva, Jacques Lacan, Jean-François Lyotard, Jacques Rancière, and Monique Wittig; and in the US: Judith Butler, Stanley Fish, Donna Haraway, Fredric Jameson, Avital Ronell, Richard Rorty, Edward Said, Eve Kosofsky Sedgwick, and Gayatri Chakravorty Spivak.

== Legacy ==
In France, from the mid-1970s, French Theory gradually faded from an intellectual landscape marked by the disappointments (on the left) of the post-May 68 period. Strong media personalities under the title of the New Philosophers led French debate towards various forms of struggle for rights and the conquest of the political apparatus for humanitarian ends. Intellectuals who claimed to be followers of Foucault, Deleuze, Baudrillard, and others disappeared from the forefront as the academic community gradually lost interest in them. It is paradoxically in this context that French Theory gained popularity in the US. In the 2000s, French Theory reappeared in France under the influence of translations of American works, taking different forms of accusatory questioning of the French model (gender studies, post-colonial studies, etc.), which pose the philosophical and political question of difference, power and the imposition of norms.
