= Kate Zambreno =

American novelist, essayist, critic and professor

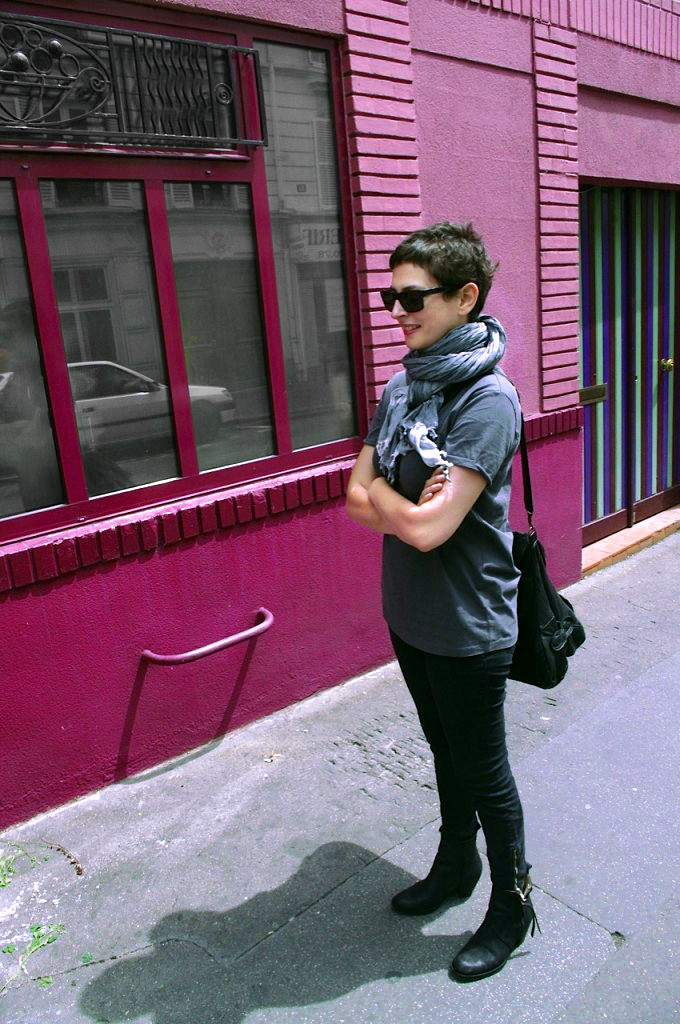
Kate Zambreno

Kate Zambreno (born December 30, 1977) is an American novelist, essayist, critic, and professor. They teach writing in the graduate nonfiction program at Columbia University and at Sarah Lawrence College. Zambreno was a 2021 Guggenheim Fellow in Nonfiction.

== Education ==
Zambreno studied journalism at Northwestern University. While an undergraduate, Zambreno was involved in experimental theater companies and was a theater critic for campus publications. An early influence was Cynthia Carr’s Village Voice "On Edge" columns, where they learned about the work of Karen Finley, David Wojnarowicz, and Kathy Acker. After college they wrote about performance and theater for Chicago-based publications, and worked as an editor at the alt-weekly Newcity. In 2001–02 they studied performance theory in the MAPH program at the University of Chicago, and wrote their master's thesis supervised by Lauren Berlant. They have spoken of Kathy Acker, David Wojnarowicz, Virginia Woolf, Sarah Kane, Marguerite Duras, and Elfriede Jelinek as early writing influences.

== Career ==
Zambreno has published ten books. They won the “Undoing the Novel'' first book contest for their novella O Fallen Angel, published by Lidia Yuknavitch’s Chiasmus Press, later reissued by Harper Perennial, along with their novel Green Girl. They wrote a blog “Frances Farmer is my Sister”, where they partially incubated their writing on gender and modernism, and was approached by Semiotext(e) editors Chris Kraus and Hedi El-Kholti to write the book which became Heroines. They published two other books with Semiotext(e), their two interconnected works on grief and the mother, Book of Mutter and Appendix Project. Their novel Drifts was published by Riverhead Books. They have written frequently on the writer Kathy Acker, including an essay in Amy Scholder’s edited ICON anthology for Feminist Press, collected in Zambreno’s collection Screen Tests, as well as the introduction to the newly reissued Black Tarantula writings for Grove Press. They also was asked to perform Acker’s Blood and Guts in High School at the MoMA, a revisiting of the 1978 Cine-Virus program curated by Kathryn Bigelow and Michael Oblowitz. Besides Kathy Acker, they have been compared to Marguerite Duras, Lydia Davis, Thomas Bernhard, Roland Barthes, Elfriede Jelinek, Virginia Woolf, Hélène Cixous, and Hervé Guibert. A study of Guibert was published by Columbia University Press. They have been called a “master of the experimental lyric essay”, and their writing is closely associated with the fragment and the diary.

Their books are often inspired by visual forms and often include art criticism, including Louise Bourgeois, Joseph Cornell, Sarah Charlesworth, Barbara Loden, and Chantal Akerman. They write frequently about art, including photography. They were an editor at Nightboat Books, where they edited Bhanu Kapil’s Schizophrene. Along with the artist John Vincler, as the collective La Genet, they made a series of pink silk sculptures hung on the main building and gave a performance at Naropa’s Violence and Community symposium, curated by Kapil, which involved reading a text that became the chapbook, “Apoplexia, Toxic Shock and Toilet Bowl: Some Notes on Why I Write”, published by Guillotine. They curated two Prose Events for Belladonna*, where they were in conversation with the writers Renee Gladman, Amina Cain, Danielle Dutton, Bhanu Kapil, among others.

They have said they share affinities with the writers Sofia Samatar, Amina Cain, Danielle Dutton, Bhanu Kapil, Suzanne Scanlon, Moyra Davey, T. Fleischmann, and Kate Briggs. Zambreno is writing a collection of essays, The Missing Person, for Riverhead, which includes an essay on Franz Kafka’s notebooks they published at VQR. In a conversation with Zambreno at The Paris Review, Sarah Manguso writes that “Kate Zambreno’s oeuvre is not just a series of books but a body of thought, an uninterrupted exhortation on incompleteness and the intersections of life, death, time, memory, and silence.”

== Personal life ==
Zambreno lives in Brooklyn, NY, with the artist and critic John Vincler. They have two daughters, Leo and Rainer, and a dog, Genet.

== Critical reception ==
=== O Fallen Angel ===
Their debut novella, O Fallen Angel, a triptych based on Francis Bacon's Three Studies for Figures at the Base of a Crucifixion and Virginia Woolf's Mrs Dalloway, set in the Midwest during 2006, which was inspired by the voice experiments of Elfriede Jelinek and Sarah Kane, as well as Angela Carter's fairy tales, features three monologues - Mommy, Maggie and the war vet/prophet Malachi. Of the novel, Michael Schaub at Bookslut wrote: "So enter Kate Zambreno, who is as much Acker as she is Woolf, as much Angela Carter as she is Elfriede Jelinek. (These are the four names most closely associated with Zambreno, and with good reason - it's almost impossible to read O Fallen Angel, her brilliant 2010 novel, without thinking of Zambreno as a perfected synthesis, but a wholly original one, of all four of those authors.)" In the new foreword to the 2017 reissue, original publisher Lidia Yuknavitch wrote "There is no writer alive like Kate Zambreno."

=== Green Girl ===
Green Girl, which has been compared to Sylvia Plath's The Bell Jar, Clarice Lispector's The Hour of the Star, and Jean Rhys's Good Morning, Midnight, stars an American Seberg-like ingenue named Ruth, who lives in London and works in the fragrance department of a department store called Horrid's. It was an early precursor of the conversation of novels featuring "unlikable" characters. James Greer at Bookforum wrote "The book is by turns bildungsroman, sociological study, deconstruction, polemic, and live-streamed dialogue with Jean Rhys, Clarice Lispector, Simone de Beauvoir, Virginia Woolf, the Bible, Roland Barthes, and most of Western European modernism by way of Walter Benjamin’s Arcades Project Elissa Schapell at Vanity Fair wrote: "I can’t recall the last time I read a book whose heroine infuriated and seduced me as completely as Kate Zambreno’s Green Girl."

=== Heroines ===
Heroines has been described as a "critical memoir", around Zambreno's obsessive life-writing of the minor figures and "mad wives" of literary modernism—Vivienne Eliot, Jane Bowles, Zelda Fitzgerald, Jean Rhys. It has been the subject of numerous panels, journal articles, performances, and essays, including a scholarly article that situates Heroines as an example of "amateur criticism" like Virginia Woolf's Three Guineas and A Room of One's Own. In The White Review, Lauren Elkin sees Heroines as an example of l'écriture féminine. Jezebel, which in June 2012 named Zambreno one of "The Jezebel 25: Kick-Ass and Amazing Women We Love" wrote of Heroines: "The book is startlingly insightful." The Paris Review wrote: "With equal parts unabashed pathos and exceptional intelligence, Heroines foregrounds female subjectivity to produce an impressive and original work that examines the suppression of various female modernists in relation to Zambreno’s own complicated position as a writer and a wife." Zambreno is also credited with adopting a novel approach to criticism in Heroines. According to Roxane Gay, who included essays on both Zambreno's Green Girl and Heroines in her Harper Perennial bestseller Bad Feminist, "Her criticism rises from emotion. It is appealing to see a writer so plainly locate the motivations behind her criticism. All too often, criticism is treated rather antiseptically under the auspices of objectivity. There is no such distance in Heroines. Zambreno revels in subjectivity."

=== Book of Mutter ===
For Semiotext(e)'s Native Agents, edited by Chris Kraus and Hedi El-Kholti, in March 2017, Zambreno published Book of Mutter, a fragmented, lyric essay on mourning and the mother modeled on Louise Bourgeois’s Cells. Jenny Hendrix wrote in the Times Literary Supplement: "Above all, Book of Mutter is a work of tone; it expresses a failure to transcend grief, written from a place of guilt and shame, in halting and inarticulate gestures...Writing may not change anything, may not heal or even console—but, like Bourgeois's Cells, it creates a space in which formlessness, pain and chaos are enclosed and held like holy relics in a church."

=== Appendix Project ===
Two years later in 2019, Appendix Project is published by Semiotext(e) as the addendum to Book of Mutter, on the ongoing project of writing about grief. Appendix Project was the culmination of a year of lectures, at Duke University, Washington University as the first Hurst Artist-as-Critic, and the Renaissance Society at the University of Chicago, and elsewhere, inspired by Roland Barthes on writing, failure, and the body, following the publication of Book of Mutter. In a starred review in Publishers Weekly, about Appendix Project: "Presented as a series of appendices to novelist and memoirist Zambreno’s previous work, Book of Mutter, this collection of 11 talks and essays reveals her anew as a master of the experimental lyric essay."

=== Screen Tests ===
Screen Tests is divided into two parts: “Stories”, a series of flash fictions that resembles essays, and “Essays”, which Zambreno has said was inspired by Borges’ Labyrinths. Several stories from Screen Tests were published in BOMB and in the spring 2019 issue of The Paris Review. Audrey Wollen describes the collection as “a collection of pulsing writings on personal fascination, theory in the form of a strobe” in The Nation. Brian Evenson writes of the book: “In Screen Tests, a voice who both is and is not the author picks up a thread and follows it wherever it leads, leaping from one thread to another without quite letting go, creating a delicate and ephemeral and wonderful portrait of how a particular mind functions. Call them stories (after Lydia Davis), reports (after Gerald Murnane), or screen tests (inventing a new genre altogether like Antoine Volodine). These are marvelously fugitive pieces, carefully composed while giving the impression of being effortless, with a quite lovely Calvino-esque lightness, that are a joy to try to keep up with.” The essays in the second half collect earlier essays on Barbara Loden, Kathy Acker, Anne Collier, and others.

=== Drifts ===
Kate Zambreno’s novel Drifts (Riverhead Books, 2020) is seen as Zambreno's entry into auto-fiction, but Zambreno has situated within the tradition of the Japanese I-novel, the notebook, and the work of W.G. Sebald and Chantal Akerman, as well as a fascination with the "hermit-bachelors", including Rainer Maria Rilke writing Notebooks of Malte Laurid Brigge. Part of Drifts is in correspondence with the writer Sofia Samatar, who also has written about Zambreno in her own work. Esquire called it "sublime new fiction from one of our most formally ambitious writers". In the Los Angeles Review of Books, Andrew Schenker described the work as “A genre-defying diary of everyday textures ... [Drifts] charts the search for a new genre, a search that Zambreno has been pursuing her whole career.” In the Los Angeles Times, Hilary Kelly writes that “Drifts is as embodied as novels come, practically vibrational as its narrator snatches her ideas out of the air and turns them into, well, 'Drifts'." In The Boston Globe, Michele Filgate calls Drifts “A stunning book that shows how life can be pregnant with possibility, even and especially when we feel isolated. ... With the melancholic splendor of its prose, Drifts is the perfect book for the moment we’re living in.”

=== To Write as if Already Dead ===
To Write as if Already Dead is about Zambreno’s attempts to write a study of Hervé Guibert’s diaristic AIDS novel: To the Friend Who Did Not Save My Life. The first half of the work is a novella like a detective story, investigating the disappearance of an online friend after an intense dialogue on anonymity, names, language, and connection. The second half is a notebook documenting the doubled history of two bodies amid plague; it continues meditations on friendship, solitude, time, mortality, precarity, art, and literature. According to Moyra Davey:

“This book is a tour de force. I was completely awestruck by the way Zambreno enacts the concept of the title, and by the way she writes the body, hers and Guibert’s. It is a moving performative act, a document of our time from the trenches, and a brilliant critical study.”

== Bibliography ==
- O Fallen Angel, Chiasmus Press, 2009.
- Heroines, Semiotext(e), MIT Press, 2012. Reissued in 2024.
- Apoplexia, toxic shock, and toilet bowl : some notes on why I write, Guillotine, 2013.
- Green Girl, Harper Perennial, 2014.
- O Fallen Angel, Harper Perennial, 2017.
- Book of Mutter, Semiotext(e), MIT Press, 2017.
- Appendix Project, Semiotext(e), MIT Press, 2019.
- Screen Tests, Harper Perennial, 2019.
- Drifts, Riverhead, 2020.
- To Write As If Already Dead, Columbia University Press, May 2021.
- The Light Room, Riverhead, 2023.
- Tone, Columbia University Press, 2023.
- Foam, Semiotext(e)/Native Agents, 2026.
