= Paul Virilio =

French philosopher, cultural theorist, and urbanist

- Born: 4 January 1932; Paris, France
- Died: 10 September 2018 (aged 86); Paris, France

Education
- Education: University of Paris

Philosophical work
- Era: Contemporary philosophy
- Region: Western philosophy
- School: Continental philosophy Christian anarchism Phenomenology (early)
- Main interests: Aesthetics, urbanism, philosophy of technology, philosophy of war
- Notable ideas: Dromology • Aesthetics of disappearance • Logistics of perception

Paul Virilio (French: [viʁiljo]; 4 January 1932 – 10 September 2018) was a French cultural theorist, urbanist, architect and aesthetic philosopher. He is best known for his writings about technology as it has developed in relation to speed and power, with diverse references to architecture, the arts, the city and the military. Virilio was a prolific creator of neologisms, most notably his concept of "dromology", the all-around, pervasive inscription of speed in every aspect of life.

According to two biographers, Virilio was a "historian of warfare, technology and photography, a philosopher of architecture, military strategy and cinema, and a politically engaged provocative commentator on history, terrorism, mass media and human-machine relations."

== Biography ==
Paul Virilio was born in Paris in 1932 to an Italian communist father and a Catholic Breton mother.

After being conscripted into the army during the Algerian War, Virilio attended lectures in phenomenology by Maurice Merleau-Ponty at the Sorbonne.

In 1998, Virilio began to teach intensive seminars at the European Graduate School. His final projects involved working with homeless groups in Paris and building the first Museum of the Accident.

== Ideas ==
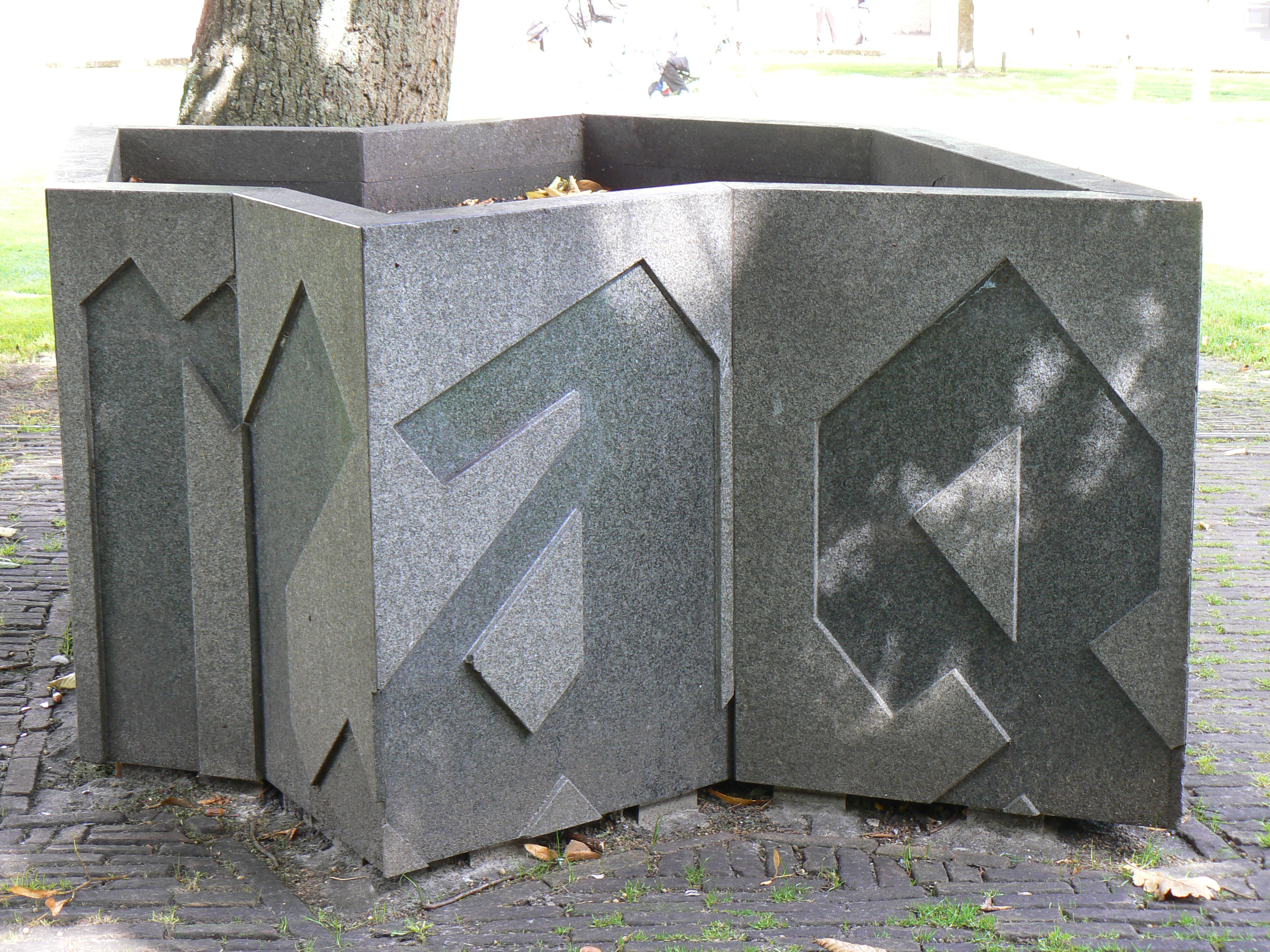
Groningen city marker fountain sculpture, designed by Virilio in 1990

Virilio coined the term "dromology" (based on dromos, an Ancient Greek noun for race or racetrack) to signify the "logic and impact of speed". Dromology is important when considering the structuring of society in relation to warfare and modern media, as the speed at which something happens may change its essential nature, and that which moves with speed quickly comes to dominate that which is slower. Hence the study of dromology "necessarily implies the study of the organisation of territory, [as whoever] controls the territory possesses it. Possession of territory is not primarily about laws and contracts, but first and foremost a matter of movement and circulation".

=== Reception ===
Jean Baudrillard, while drawing on Virilio's works in 1985, eventually stated in 1988 that Virilio's analyses were out of date as "Speed is out!", stating that immobility has set in because "all trips have already taken place".

A book-length criticism of Virilio's work to 2004 was written by Steve Redhead. He observed:

His scattergun writing style is not always easy to follow, often provoking disorientation and dislocation at the very least. Insights, personal memories, detailed histories, major theoretical leaps and banalities sit side by side.

He also notes that Virilio does not pass the grade in academic studies:

Reading Virilio thoroughly does leave the reader with the feeling of many dislocated, undeveloped ideas swirling around often at the level of great generality. The content is often not particularly logical if viewed from a conventional academic perspective in the human or social sciences.

However, for Law and Popular Culture, Redhead concedes Virilio as a factor:

Paul Virilio's writing have long had a major role in the theoretical socio-legal studies subdiscipline of law and popular culture which has operated at the intersection of critical legal studies and cultural studies for over two decades.

In 2014, Mark Lacy, an analyst of security, technology and global politics noted:

Virilio is unlikely to be read in the 'mainstream' of academia (although one might find his works on the reading lists of a military academy).

Lacy credits Virilio with balancing the propaganda of progress against the management of fear at some cost:

Virilio draws on and develops points that are made by many critical thinkers from (predominantly) the twentieth century (most notably Walter Benjamin), assembling ideas in new contexts, creating a vision of the world through concepts and language that is often unsettling, a (re)description that makes the world feel strange and unfamiliar. Virilio's often alien-sounding concepts attempt to enable us to see the world anew, to view a world that is presented to us in terms of fear and progress as something alien (and alienating), to give a form to feelings and suspicions that remain vague, unclear, uncertain, out of place.

==== Sokal and Bricmont ====
Virilio was one of the many cultural theorists (and other postmodernists) criticized by physicists Alan Sokal and Jean Bricmont in 1997 for what they characterize as misunderstanding and misuse of science and mathematics. Virilio's works are the subject of chapter 10 of Fashionable Nonsense. Their criticism consists of a series of quotes (often long) from Virilio's works, and then explanations of how Virilio confuses basic physics concepts and abuses scientific terminology, to the point of absurdity. In the authors' words:

The writings of Paul Virilio revolve principally around the themes of technology, communication, and speed. They contain a plethora of references to physics, particularly the theory of relativity. Though Virilio's sentences are slightly more meaningful than those of Deleuze-Guattari, what is presented as "science" is a mixture of monumental confusions and wild fantasies. Furthermore, his analogies between physics and social questions are the most arbitrary imaginable, when he does not simply become intoxicated with his own words. We confess our sympathy with many of Virilio's political and social views; but the cause is not, alas, helped by his pseudo-physics.

A criticism of a passage often reads something like this:

Here Virilio mixes up velocity (vitesse) and acceleration, the two basic concepts of kinematics (the description of motion), which are introduced and carefully distinguished at the beginning of every introductory physics course.[221] Perhaps this confusion isn't worth stressing; but for a purported specialist in the philosophy of speed, it is nonetheless a bit surprising.

They end their chapter with a long quote followed by this comment:

This paragraph — which in the French original is a single 193-word sentence, whose "poetry" is unfortunately not fully captured by the translation — is the most perfect example of diarrhea of the pen that we have ever encountered. And as far as we can see, it means precisely nothing.

== Bibliography ==
- Speed and Politics: An Essay on Dromology. New York: Semiotext(e), 1977 [1986]
- War and Cinema: The Logistics of Perception. London: Verso, 1989.
- Popular Defense and Ecological Struggles. New York: Semiotext(e), 1990.
- The Aesthetics of Disappearance. New York: Semiotext(e), 1991.
- Lost Dimension. New York: Semiotext(e), 1991.
- Atom Egoyan. Paris: Dis Voir, 1994.
- The Vision Machine. Bloomington: Indiana University Press, 1994.
- Bunker Archaeology. New York: Princeton University Press, 1994.
- The Art of the Motor. Minneapolis: University of Minnesota Press, 1995.
- Open Sky. London: Verso, 1997.
- Pure War. New York: Semiotext(e), 1997.
- Politics of the Very Worst. New York: Semiotext(e), 1999.
- Polar Inertia. London: Sage, 1999.
- A Landscape of Events. Cambridge: MIT Press, 2000.
- The Information Bomb. London: Verso, 2000.
- Strategy of Deception. London: Verso, 2000.
- Virilio Live: Selected Interviews. Edited by John Armitage. London: Sage, 2001.
- Ground Zero. London: Verso, 2002.
- Desert Screen: War at the Speed of Light. London: Continuum, 2002.
- Crepuscular Dawn. New York: Semiotext(e), 2002.
- Art and Fear. London: Continuum, 2003. ( originally published in 2000 by Editions Galilee under the title La Procedure Silence, meaning "The Silence Trial". )
- Unknown Quantity. New York: Thames & Hudson, 2003.
- City of Panic. Oxford: Berg, 2005.
- The Accident of Art. (with Sylvère Lotringer) New York: Semiotext(e), 2005.
- Negative Horizon: An Essay in Dromoscopy. London: Continuum, 2005.
- Art as Far as the Eye Can See. Oxford: Berg Publishers, 2007.
- The Original Accident. Cambridge: Polity, 2007
- Grey Ecology. New York/Dresden: Atropos Press, 2009.
- The University of Disaster. Cambridge: Polity, 2010.
- The Futurism of the Instant: Stop-Eject. Cambridge: Polity, 2010.
- A Winter's Journey : Four Conversations with Marianne Brausch. The French list. Seagull Books, 2011.
- The Administration of Fear. New York: Semiotext(e), 2012.
- The Great Accelerator. Cambridge: Polity, 2012.
