= Sylvère Lotringer =

French literary critic (1938–2021)

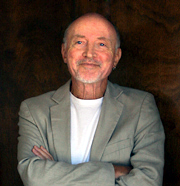
- Lotringer in 2008
- Born: 15 October 1938; Paris, France
- Died: 8 November 2021 (aged 83); Ensenada, Baja California, Mexico
- Spouses: Lucienne Binet (m. 1963–1976; sep. 1972, div. 1976); Chris Kraus (c. 1983, m. 1988; sep. 2005, div. 2014); Iris Klein (m. 2014)
- Partner: Susie Flato (c. 1972; sep. 1976)
- Children: 1

Education
- Education: University of Paris; École pratique des hautes études
- Doctoral advisor: Roland Barthes; Lucien Goldman

Philosophical work
- Era: Contemporary philosophy
- Region: Western philosophy
- School: Continental philosophy
- Institutions: Columbia University; European Graduate School; Institute for Doctoral Studies in the Visual Arts (IDSVA)
- Notable students: Kathryn Bigelow; Tim Griffin; John Kelsey; Ariana Reines

Sylvère Lotringer (15 October 1938 – 8 November 2021) was a French literary critic and cultural theorist. Initially based in New York City, he later lived in Los Angeles and Baja California, Mexico. He is best known for synthesizing French theory with American literary, cultural and architectural avant-garde movements as founder of the journal Semiotext(e) and for his interpretations of theory in a 21st-century context. He is regarded as an influential interpreter of Jean Baudrillard's theories, among others.

== Life and work ==
Lotringer was born in Paris to Doba (Borenstein) and Cudek Lotringer, Polish Jewish immigrants who left Warsaw for France in 1930, where they ran a fur shop. His early life was marked by the Nazi occupation of Paris, and like his contemporaries Georges Perec and Sarah Kofman, he spent the war as a "hidden child." In 1949, Lotringer emigrated to Israel with his family and returned to Paris the year after to join the left-wing Zionist movement Hashomer-Hatzair (The Young Garde) and became one of its leaders. He left the movement eight years later. In 1957, while still at the lycée, Lotringer joined the editorial collective of La Ligne Générale headed by Perec. Taking its name from Sergei Eisenstein's famous film The General Line, this group of young Jewish men favored Hollywood westerns, slapstick and pre-Stalinist communism. The project was praised by Henri Lefebvre but strongly criticized by Simone de Beauvoir, who found it "politically irresponsible."

Entering the Sorbonne in 1958, Lotringer created L’Étrave, a literary magazine, with Nicole Chardaire and contributed to Paris-Lettres, the journal of the French Students' Association (1959–61). As President of the UNEF freshman class at the Sorbonne, he led mobilizations against France's colonial Algerian War. In 1964, he entered the École pratique des hautes études, VIe section (sociology). He received his Ph.D. in the sociology of literature from the institution in 1967 after completing a dissertation on Virginia Woolf's novels under the supervision of Roland Barthes and Lucien Goldmann. His work was aided by his friendship with Leonard Woolf and his acquaintance with T. S. Eliot and Vita Sackville-West, with whom he conducted interviews published in Louis Aragon's journal Les Lettres Francaises during his ten years as a correspondent.

Avoiding French military service in Algeria, Lotringer spent 1962 in the United States and then taught for the French Cultural Services as a lecturer at Atatürk University in Erzurum, Turkey from 1965 to 1967. He returned to the United States via Australia (where he briefly taught at the University of New South Wales) as an assistant professor of French at Swarthmore College in 1969. Following two years as an associate professor at Case Western Reserve University in Cleveland, Ohio, he joined the faculty of Columbia University as a tenured associate professor of French and comparative literature in the autumn of 1972. He was promoted to full professor in 1985 and retired as professor emeritus in 2009. He was also known for his second marriage (1988–2014; sep. 2005) to writer and filmmaker Chris Kraus.

Lotringer died on Monday, 8 November 2021 in Baja California after a long illness.

== Cultural synthesis ==
Arriving in New York City in the early 1970s, Lotringer saw the opportunity to introduce French theorists whose work at that time was largely unknown in the U.S. to the city's artistic and literary community. Playing chess in the West Village with John Cage, he sensed similarities between Thoreau and the "chance operations" being practiced by Fluxus, William S. Burroughs, Brion Gysin and others, and the Nietzsche-inspired post-structuralist theorists. Uninspired by the doctrinaire post-Frankfurt School Marxism of the American Left, he sought to introduce independently the more fluid and rhizomatic ideas of power and desire developed by Gilles Deleuze, Félix Guattari, and Michel Foucault. In his book on French Theory's influence in the U.S., François Cusset wrote that Lotringer and Semiotext(e) "played a breathtaking role in the early diffusion of French theory", positioned along the "porous border between the university and the countercultural networks". A few years later Lotringer discovered Paul Virilio's theory of speed and technology and Baudrillard's analysis of consumer culture's infinite exchangeability, introducing them in turn into American political discourse.

A younger contemporary of Gilles Deleuze, Félix Guattari, Jean Baudrillard, Paul Virilio and Michel Foucault, Lotringer invited a small group of graduate students to study these thinkers, who were not yet part of the curriculum. Together with his partner Susie Flato and graduate student John Reichman, he began the journal Semiotext(e) in 1973 with the goal of introducing French theory to America. The group expanded and produced three issues on the epistemology of semiotics. In 1975, they staged the provocative Schizo-Culture conference on Madness and Prisons at Columbia University, where more than 2,000 attendees witnessed "show-downs" between Foucault, conspiracy-theorist Lyndon LaRouche, Guattari, feminist Ti-Grace Atkinson, Ronald D. Laing, and others. The event helped to define a new mode of cultural discourse over the coming decade, and set the stage for future issues of Semiotext(e), which abandoned its scholarly format in favor of collaged images and texts by Deleuze, Foucault, Jean-François Lyotard, Guy Hocquenghem, Jacques Derrida, Heiner Müller and their (as Lotringer saw it) American counterparts: Cage, Burroughs, Richard Foreman, Jack Smith, Kathy Acker, and others. In 1978, Lotringer staged The Nova Convention, a three-day homage to Burroughs at New York University and in the East Village. Featuring performances and talks by Patti Smith, Frank Zappa, Laurie Anderson, Terry Southern, Robert Anton Wilson, Timothy Leary, and Burroughs himself, the event acclaimed Burroughs as "a philosopher of the future [...] the man who best understood post-industrial society", and popularized his work among New York's punk "no-wave" generation. This provocative mix of street and academy, theory, art and politics, would become Semiotext(e)'s trademark.

Determining that the collectivity that marked New York's cultural life was disappearing in the 1980s, Lotringer ceased regular publication of the Semiotext(e) journal in 1985, though book-length issues appeared into the 1990s. In its place, he instituted the Semiotext(e) "Foreign Agents" series—a collection of "little black books" by French theorists. Published with no introductions or afterwords, the books were conceived to present "theory brut" (like champagne) into the American cultural marketplace. The series debuted in 1983 with Baudrillard's Simulations, excerpted by Lotringer from Symbolic Exchange and Death (1977) and Simulacra and Simulations (1981). Simulations spawned a new art-movement and served as the theoretical template for the Keanu Reeves movie, The Matrix (1999). Simulations was followed later in the same year by Pure War, Lotringer's book-length conversation with Paul Virilio, in which the "philosopher of speed" expounded his vision of bunker archeology, accidents, and dromology. The last, On the Line, by Deleuze and Guattari, included Rhizome, which anticipated Internet culture.

In 2004, Hedi El Kholti began working as an art director with Lotringer and Kraus on Semiotext(e) and soon after joined them as a co-editor.

== Teaching and influence ==
Teaching 20th century French literature and philosophy at Columbia University for 35 years, Lotringer elaborated connections between modernist literature and fascism in his lectures, interpreting the "crazed modernists" Antonin Artaud, Georges Bataille, Louis-Ferdinand Céline, and Simone Weil as harbingers of the Jewish Holocaust. As a scholar of the 20th century, he emphasized the experiential, "pre-modern" political roots of French theories that are often misread as cavalier orgies of cruelty, envisaging them as an attempt to create symbolic antidotes to both fascism and consumerism.

Lotringer influenced the work of former students including filmmaker Kathryn Bigelow, semiotician Marshall Blonsky, art critics Tim Griffin and John Kelsey, actor Jim Fletcher, and poet Ariana Reines. He appears as a quasi-fictional character in Kathy Acker's Great Expectations and My Mother: Demonology, in Chris Kraus' I Love Dick, Alien & Anorexia and Torpor, and in Eileen Myles' Inferno. Lotringer was also Jean Baudrillard Chair and Professor of Philosophy at The European Graduate School.

== New politics ==
Defining himself as a "foreign agent provocateur" in the United States, Lotringer traveled to Italy in 1979 and 1980 to document first-hand Italy's embattled post-Marxist Autonomia movement and secure their legacy. His participant-observation with the innovative political movement resulted in Italy: Autonomia – Post-Political Politics, a 1980 special publication of Semiotext(e). In 1992, he sought out former Black Panther Dhoruba al-Mujahid bin Wahad, who had just been provisionally released from prison after spending 19 years incarcerated on a charge of "sedition." Lotringer invited Dhoruba to produce a Semiotext(e) book vindicating and updating the Black Panther Party's position. The result was Still Black, Still Strong, an anthology of writings by Assata Shakur, Mumia Abu-Jamal and Bin-Wahad.

In 2001, Lotringer co-edited the ironically titled Hatred of Capitalism: A Semiotext(e) Reader. Released in the wake of the September 11 attacks, the anthology strove to clarify Semiotext(e)'s composite vision of politics, intelligence and radical humor. Summing up the Semiotext(e) self-styled mission, Lotringer used an observation made to him by filmmaker Jack Smith as an epigraph: "The world is starving for thoughts. If you can think of something, the language will fall into place, but the thought is what's going to do it".

Realizing that the Foreign Agents books of the 1980s were being absorbed within mainstream academe, Lotringer sought out new works that would address global politics from the perspective of activism. He commissioned Israeli journalist Amira Hass' award-winning Reporting From Ramallah (2003), and French military specialist Alain Joxe's Empire of Disorder (2002) for Semiotext(e). Resuming his dialogue with Paul Virilio in Crepuscular Dawn (2002), he pushed the philosopher to elaborate on the historical antecedents and repercussions of genetic engineering. His third dialogue with Virilio, Accident of Art (2006), expanded the Virilian notion of "accident" to encompass the impact of war on contemporary art. In 2006, he returned to his interest in Italian political theory, commissioning and publishing works by Paolo Virno, Franco Berardi, Christian Marazzi and Antonio Negri.

== Decorations ==
- Officer of the Order of Arts and Letters (2015)

== Publications ==
- "Barthes After Barthes," Frieze, 2011.
- Pure War, with Paul Virilio, Semiotext(e) History of the Present, Cambridge: 2008 (first published by Semiotext(e) Foreign Agents, New York: 1983).
- Overexposed: Perverting Perversions, Pantheon, New York: 1987 and Semiotext(e) History of the Present, Cambridge: 2007.
- David Wojnarowitz: A Definitive History of Five or Six years on the Lower East Side, Cambridge: Semiotext(e), 2006
- "Forget Baudrillard," in Forget Foucault, Semiotext(e) History of the Present, Cambridge: 2006.
- Pazzi di Artaud, Medusa, Milan: 2006.
- The Accident of Art, with Paul Virilio, Semiotext(e), Cambridge: 2005.
- The Conspiracy of Art, with Jean Baudrillard, Semiotext(e), Cambridge: 2005.
- Oublier Artaud, Sens and Tonka, Paris: 2005.
- Boules de Suif, Sens and Tonka, Paris: 2005.
- "My '80s: Better Than Life," Artforum, April 2003.
- Fous d’Artaud, Sens and Tonka, Paris: 2003.
- The Collected Interviews of William S. Burroughs, Cambridge: Semiotext(e), 2002
- Crepuscular Dawn, with Paul Virilio, Semiotext(e), Cambridge: 2002.
- "Time Bomb," in Crepuscular Dawn, Semiotext(e), Cambridge: 2002.
- French Theory in America, New York, Routledge: 2001
- Nancy Spero, London: Phaedon Press: 1996.
- Foreign Agent: Kuntz in den Zeiten des Theorie, Merve Verlag, Berlin: 1992.
- Germania, with Heiner Müller, Semiotext(e), New York: 1990.
- Antonin Artaud, New York: Scribners & Sons: 1990.
- Philosophen-Künstler, Merve Verlag, Berlin: 1986.
- "Uncle Fishook and the Sacred Baby Poo-poo of Art," with Jack Smith in SchizoCulture, Semiotext(e) ed. III, 2, 1978.
