= Sergio González Rodríguez =

Mexican journalist (1950-2017)

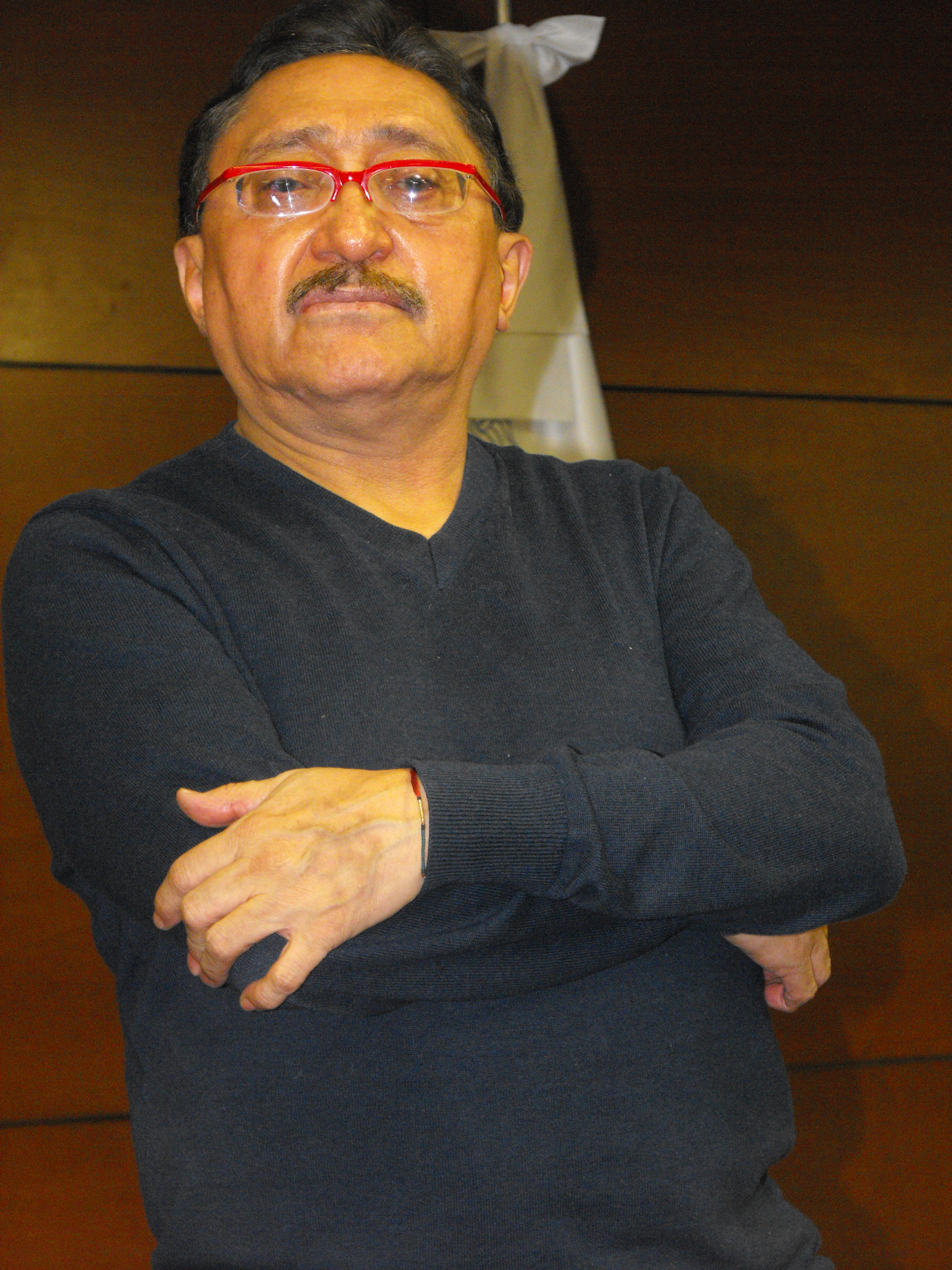
- González Rodríguez at Tec de Monterrey, Mexico City
- Born: 26 January 1950; Mexico City
- Died: 3 April 2017 (aged 67); Mexico City
- Education: National Autonomous University of Mexico
- Occupations: Journalist, critic, essayist and screenwriter
- Writing career
- Language: Spanish
- Years active: 1993–2017
- Notable works: Bones in the Desert, The Headless Man, The Femicide Machine, The Iguala 43, Field of Battle
- Notable awards: Fernando Benítez National Journalism Prize (1995)

Sergio González Rodríguez (Note: In this Spanish name, the first or paternal surname is González and the second or maternal family name is Rodríguez.) (26 January 1950 – 3 April 2017) was a Mexican journalist and writer who was best known for his works on the femicides in Ciudad Juárez from the 1990s to the 2000s, such as Huesos en el desierto (Bones in the Desert) and The Femicide Machine. González Rodríguez was a writer who worked in many literary genres, producing literary journalism or crónicas [es], novels, essays, and screenplays for documentaries. His writing was recognized with several awards in Mexico and Spain.

== Life ==
González Rodríguez was born in Mexico City in 1950. His mother died while he was in the third grade and his father abandoned his family, forming another family. González Rodríguez studied modern literature at the National Autonomous University of Mexico (UNAM) from 1978 to 1982. Apart from his writing career he was a rock musician, playing bass with some of his brothers in a band named Enigma.

Following the publication of Huesos en el desierto (2002), González Rodríguez was kidnapped via taxi and beaten by assailants who warned him that his work was being "closely monitored"; he suffered a cerebral hemorrhage and survived the attack, continuing his journalistic work.

González Rodríguez died in hospital on 3 April 2017 from a heart attack.

== Career ==
González Rodríguez made his career as a critic, narrator, essayist, literary historian and scriptwriter.

After graduating, he worked at the Historical Studies Department of the Instituto Nacional de Antropología e Historia (INAH) from 1985 to 1988. From 1990 to 1992, he was an assistant of the Exhibition Coordination of CONACULTA, working on a multimedia production called "Asamblea de ciudades, la Ciudad de México 1920–1950". His work in journalism includes editing at the Estudio de Salvador Novo A.C. and at the Biblioteca de México magazine from 1993 to 2000, as well as serving as editor and photographer at the Luna Córnea magazine from 1992 to 2002. When the Reforma newspaper was founded in 1993, he joined as editor and columnist for both the regular paper and its cultural supplement, called El Ángel. He also worked for La Jornada.

González Rodríguez was best known for his investigative work about the femicides in Ciudad Juárez, Chihuahua, in the 1990s and 2000s. He began as an investigative reporter, making his first trip to the area in 1995 for Reforma. His series of articles served as the basis for the book Huesos en el desierto (Bones in the Desert), published in 2002, which mixes reporting, essay and reflective writing. This work was a finalist at the Lettre Ulysses International Prize of Literary Reporting in Germany and was translated into Italian and French. It influenced other writing on the topic, including a direct collaboration with writer Roberto Bolaño, who was writing the novel 2666 in the early 2000s as well. González Rodríguez blamed the murders of the women on machismo and misogyny in Mexico. This examination of violence led to two other books that form a trilogy on modern violence, El hombre sin cabeza (The Headless Man) and Campo de guerra (Field of Battle) which examine drug-related violence and the role of international politics, respectively.

As a screenwriter, he wrote for the television series México, Siglo XX, and a documentary called Nacional Dominical which he also directed with Roberto Diego Ortega. In 1993 his script for the documentary Los bajos fondos, produced by the UNAM, won first prize at the third Festival y Muestra Nacional de Televisión y Video at the Instituciones de Enseñanza Superior en México.

He worked as a professor at the Doctor José María Luis Mora Research Center.

== Works ==
González Rodríguez wrote or co-wrote over twenty books, (Note: "Before he died at the age of 67 on April 3, 2017, he had written more than 20 books, establishing himself as one of the most important Mexican writers of his generation. He wrote novels, essays and what in Mexico are called crónicas, many of which were works of literary journalism that defy characterization and category.") also contributing to the Anales de Literatura Hispanoamericana of the Universidad Complutense, Biblioteca de México, El Nacional Dominical, Ínsula (Spain), a supplement of Siempre! magazine called La Cultura en México, La Jornada Semanal, Letras Libres, Nexos, and the Revista Universidad de México.

His novels included El triángulo imperfecto (2003), El plan Schreber (2004), La pandilla cósmica (2005) and El vuelo (2008). In 2014, he published a novel called El artista adolescente que confundía el mundo con un cómic, which integrated elements of graphic novels and comics into both the literary style and the storyline. Other titles included the essays Los bajos fondos, el antro, la bohemia y el café (1988), El Centauro en el paisaje (1992), De sangre y de sol (2006) and El hombre sin cabeza. He also edited Viajes y ensayos by Salvador Novo (1997).

== Crónicas ==
González Rodríguez wrote three closely related works of non-fiction which examine crime, corruption and the Drug War in Mexico: The Femicide Machine, The Iguala 43 (Los 43 de Iguala) and Field of Battle (Campo de guerra). The latter two books were originally published in Spanish by Anagrama, and all three books were translated into English and published as entries in the Semiotext(e) Intervention Series. González Rodríguez wrote The Femicide Machine specifically for the Intervention Series; although it is a distinct text from the longer Huesos en el desierto, both books examine the Ciudad Juárez femicides.

The three works are examples of crónicas [es], the Spanish word for a genre of literary journalism which blends straight reporting and editorializing.

=== The Femicide Machine ===
In The Femicide Machine, González Rodríguez examines a series of circumstances which he argues have conspired to produce Ciudad Juárez's female homicide victims. Although violence associated with Mexico's illegal drug trade is one factor, he also considers the city's proximity to the U.S. border, its cultural and geographic separation from the rest of Mexico, historical prevalence of technology in the city (particularly cars and cell phones) and the impact of NAFTA which incentivized the growth of maquiladoras along the border. These factories provided employment opportunities for women; according to González Rodríguez, this provoked a misogynistic resentment in Mexico's culture of machismo. (Note: "Women—above all, working women—moved into the role of the urban protagonist, a role as direct as it was subliminal. The presence of women in the home, on the street, in factories, and in spaces used for relaxation and leisure unleashed men's hatred.") In González Rodríguez's account, the confluence of these factors gave rise to a process which resulted in Ciudad Juárez's high rate of female murder victims; the process itself can be likened to a machine.

The text concludes with an account of the 2001 kidnapping and murder of Lilia Alejandra García Andrade, a factory worker and resident of Ciudad Juárez; following the murder, her mother Norma Andrade began activism against the femicides in Ciudad Juárez and was herself attacked.

=== The Iguala 43 ===
The Iguala 43 examines the kidnapping of 43 male students in Iguala, Guerrero, which ended with their presumptive murders. As in The Femicide Machine, González Rodríguez considers a series of historical circumstances which informed the tragedy—this time affecting male victims in Mexico's south, as opposed to female victims in its north.

On 26 September 2014, a group of male students from the Ayotzinapa Rural Teachers' College commandeered two local buses which they drove to nearby Iguala, where they took another three. Their plan was to travel to Mexico City to participate in protests commemorating the 1968 Tlatelolco massacre, after which they would return the buses. In one account of following events, local police attacked the students, killing some, and then apprehended the survivors, turning them over to the Guerreros Unidos, a local criminal drug trafficking organization. The Guerreros Unidos then killed the surviving students and burned their bodies, disposing of the remains.

González Rodríguez explains the historical circumstances that led to the atrocity. Located in Mexico's south, the Ayotzinapa Rural Teachers' college has a far-left political tradition, producing alumni such as Lucio Cabañas and Genaro Vázquez Rojas who subsequently became guerrillas opposed to the Institutional Revolutionary Party's regime; a historical antagonism between Mexican authorities and Ayotzinapa personnel was formed. Further, there was an existing tradition of the forced disappearance and killing of activists; González Rodríguez cites the case of Rosendo Radilla, an activist who was stopped at a military checkpoint near the Guerrero coast in 1974 and never seen again. Taken together with the overall societal corruption and increased violence during the Mexican drug war, González Rodríguez assigns blame for the massacre jointly to the governments of Mexico and the United States, on account of internal corruption and ongoing CIA operations within Mexico, respectively.

=== Field of Battle ===
González Rodríguez uses the metaphor of anamorphosis to describe the altered reality experienced by victims of violent crime, citing the distorted skull in Hans Holbein the Younger's The Ambassadors.

In Field of Battle, González Rodríguez examines the contemporary militarization of Mexican society in response to drug-related violence. The central argument of the book is that the de facto absence of the rule of law is the root cause for ongoing violent crime and suffering within Mexico. This absence of the rule of law is generated by corruption which begins by eroding the legitimacy of the rule of law itself, and which ends by creating an "a-legal" world in which the distinction between legality and illegality becomes meaningless because crimes are rarely punished (Note: "In general, 91% of common crimes [in Mexico] are not reported because of the ineptness and inefficiency of the authorities.") and law enforcement themselves often do not enforce or respect the law. Given these circumstances, González Rodríguez uses the visual phenomenon of anamorphosis as a metaphor to describe the subjectively distorted reality experienced by victims of violent crime in Mexico who are often caught between police corruption, an inefficient legal system, and the violence of gangs or drug cartels.

The humanity of a person is objectified and reduced to their usefulness or uselessness for criminal activities, or to collateral damage on the part of the armed forces. The life world for those subjected to criminal domination or to the fight against crime tends to be emptied out and replaced with impositions, rules and the whims of criminals. Without this emptiness, there would be no anamorphosis of the victims, who glimpse a threat from their first contact—whether direct or indirect—with organized crime or government authority.

— Field of Battle, p. 104.

González Rodríguez concludes the text by advocating nonviolence and respect for the rule of law as antidotes both to drug violence and also to the militarization of Mexican society because unlike the latter, the former represent peaceful means which are consistent with their peaceful end. (Note: "Nonviolence arises from the righteousness of the cause and the unity of all those who struggle. The means are therefore consistent with the end when nonviolence is used. With weapons, it is the end that justifies the means. Furthermore, weapons, especially weapons of mass destruction, are invented to destroy the values we wish to protect. The power of the truth makes us conscious of injustice and of our responsibilities.")

Most of the passages from The Femicide Machine's third chapter War City/Mexico-USA are recycled throughout Field of Battle. In particular, the fourth chapter of Field of Battle, Global War on Drug Trafficking, rephrases and slightly permutes the latter two-thirds of War City/Mexico-USA. (Note: For example, The Femicide Machine has "In 2008, more than 200 people were apprehended in the United States and Italy, after links were established between Mexico's Zetas and the Italian 'Ndrangheta Mafia organization—a 55 billion dollar per year criminal enterprise.", while Field of Battle has "In 2008, over 200 people were arrested in the United States and Italy after a connection was uncovered between the Zetas and the 'Ndrangheta, whose criminal enterprises have an annual revenue of 55 billion dollars.". The difference in (English) language is due to the two different English translators, Michael Parker-Stainback and Joshua Neuhouser respectively.) In both cases the material covers the geopolitical interests of the United States via CIA operations within Mexico and Latin America, and the expansion of Mexican drug trafficking to Europe via West Africa.

== Recognition ==
In 1993, González Rodríguez was a finalist at the Anagrama Essay Prize in Barcelona, Spain, with the work El centauro en el paisaje. This was followed in 1995 by the Fernando Benítez National Journalism Prize in Mexico for Mujer de table-dance.

The work Huesos en el desierto was a finalist at the Lettre Ulysses International Prize of Literary Reporting in Germany and a finalist in the Herralde Novel Prize in 2004.

El triángulo imperfecto (2003) was a finalist of the Antonin Artaud Prize for novels in Mexico.

In 2013, he won the Premio Casa América Catalunya a la Libertad de Expresión en Iberoamérica, followed by the Anagrama Essay Prize for Campo de guerra in 2014.

González Rodríguez's work was supported by grants from FONCA (1990–1991), two from the Rockefeller Foundation and from the history department of the Universidad Iberoamericana (1990–1999).

He was a member of Mexico's Sistema Nacional de Creadores de Arte since 1996.
