= Maurizio Lazzarato =

French sociologist and philosopher

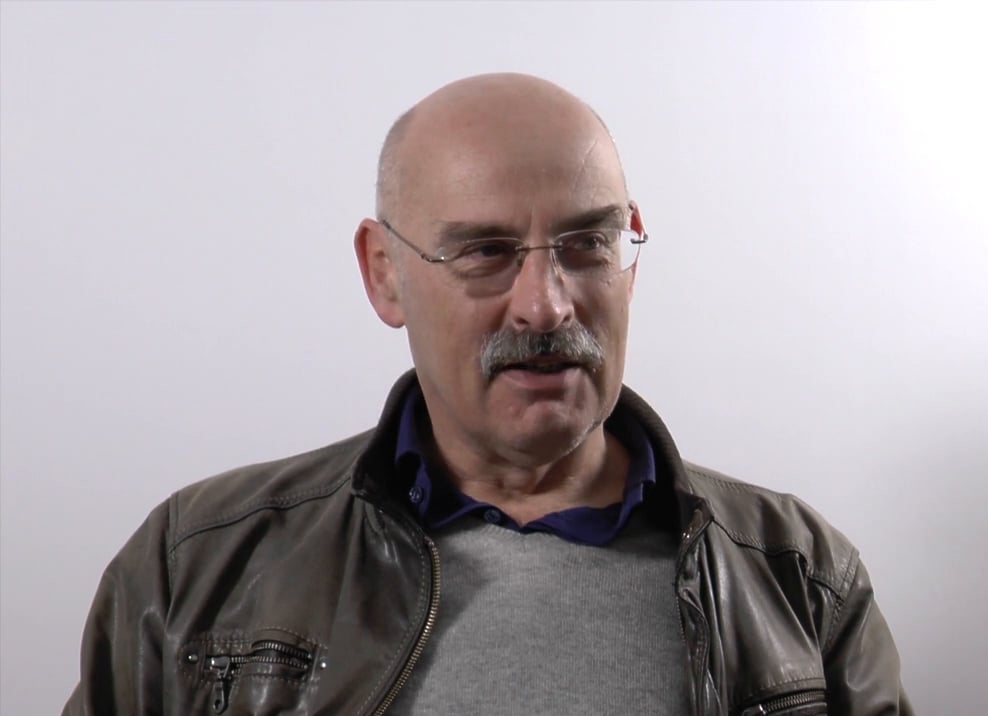
- Lazzarato in 2014
- Born: 1955 (age 70–71)

Academic background
- Education: University of Padua; Université de Paris VIII (PhD)
- Thesis: Les machines à cristalliser le temps : perception et travail dans le post-fordisme (1996)
- Doctoral advisor: Jean-Marie Vincent

Academic work
- Discipline: Sociologist
- School or tradition: Western Marxism
- Institutions: University of Paris I

Maurizio Lazzarato (born 1955) is an Italian sociologist and philosopher, residing in Paris, France. In the 1970s, he was an activist in the workers' movement (Autonomia Operaia) in Italy. Lazzarato was a founding member of the editorial board of the journal Multitudes. He is a researcher at Matisse/CNRS, Pantheon-Sorbonne University (University of Paris I), and a member of the Collège international de philosophie in Paris.

== Biography ==
Lazzarato studied at the University of Padua in the 1970s, where he was active in the Autonomia Operaia movement. He left Italy in the late 1970s for exile in France to escape political prosecution, although the charges against him were abandoned in the 1990s.

== Thought ==
Lazzarato is known for his essay "Immaterial Labor" that appeared in a collection of contemporary Italian political theory edited by Marxist philosophers Michael Hardt and Paolo Virno, called Radical Thought in Italy (1996). His research focuses on immaterial labor, the transformation of wage labor, and work, and cognitive capitalism. He is also interested in the concepts of biopolitics and bioeconomics.

== Works on debt ==
Lazzarato has written two closely related works on the subject of debt, The Making of the Indebted Man and Governing by Debt. Both books were translated into English and published as part of the Semiotext(e) Intervention Series. In both works, Lazzarato uses continental philosophy and economic data to critique debt and neoliberalism from a left-wing perspective.

=== The Making of the Indebted Man ===
In The Making of the Indebted Man, Lazzarato examines debt as it is experienced by individuals, specifically the subject; he also presents a case that the debtor-creditor relationship is a central category of economics—more important than money or finance, for example. In the modern economy, it is taken for granted that debts must be repaid, and much of economic activity is driven by lending with the expectation (or: promise) of future repayment. Lazzarato observes that in order for such an economy to function, its actors must first be socialized to accept the premise that debts must be repaid. This entails that they become capable of making promises (to repay a debt) and of feeling guilt (on failing to repay a debt). To illustrate this process, he refers to the second treatise of Nietzsche's Genealogy of Morality, which deals with the concepts of guilt, debt, and socialization.

What is credit/debt in its most elementary sense? A promise of payment. What is a financial asset, a share, or bond? The promise of future value. "Promise", "value," and "future" are also key words in Nietzsche's Second Essay. For Nietzsche, the "oldest and most personal relationship there is" is that between creditor and debtor, a relationship wherein "person met person for the first time, and measured himself person against person." Consequently, the task of a community or society has first of all been to engender a person capable of promising, someone able to stand guarantor for himself in the creditor-debtor relationship, that is, capable of honoring his debt. Making a person capable of keeping a promise means constructing a memory for him, endowing him with interiority, a conscience, which provide a bulwark against forgetting. It is within the domain of debt obligations that memory, subjectivity, and conscience begin to be produced.

— The Making of the Indebted Man, pp. 39-40.

Lazzarato refers to the socializing process of creating individual subjects as "subjectivation". He also contrasts the Nietzschean view of credit/debt with those given by Marx and by Deleuze and Guattari in Anti-Oedipus. The latter part of the book is a criticism of debt as used in European neoliberal governance, introducing ideas which are developed more fully in Governing by Debt.

The Making of the Indebted Man has proved crucial for the application of the theorizing of neoliberal debt in relation to material culture and contemporary art.

=== Governing by Debt ===
In Governing by Debt, Lazzarato uses the vocabulary developed in Making of the Indebted Man to examine how debt is employed by states and private enterprise, as opposed to individuals. The book is a critique of neoliberalism and governmentality where the latter refers to a form of government which responds to economic demands, a notion closely related to ordoliberalism. Lazzarato characterizes American student debt as an ideal example of the credit/debt economy, and also uses history and anthropology to trace a cultural notion of "infinite debt" (e.g. life-debt, original sin) which he argues has informed the modern economy.

The book's central idea is that basic categories of the economic and political spheres (which are commonly opposed, or spoken of as separate items) are in fact not distinct, but closely related and overlapping. For example, governments and businesses closely coordinate their policies, laws, business practices and expectations, and are therefore coupled with each other. Lazzarato cites the work of Carl Schmitt to illustrate the point. (Note: "Schmitt critiques 'liberal' thinking and its claim to neutralize the political nature of the economy by transforming it into 'economics'. From the lofty perspective of its scientific knowledge, economics asserts that the political solution to the 'social question' depends on the growth of production and consumption, which can be understood and function only according to the laws of the market. Conversely, Schmitt argues that the economy is the contemporary form of the political such that the international division of labor represents the 'true constitution of the earth today'.) Lazzarato also cites Foucault's work The Birth of Biopolitics to illustrate the social experience of debt; however he criticizes the distinction that Foucault makes between states and economies, with classical liberalism as a mediator. Further, the distinction between industrial capitalism and financial capitalism is questioned; however Lazzarato retains the distinction in the sense that financial capitalism is the "purest" form of capitalism, because it simply transforms one form of money into another form of money through valorization (e.g. via the circulation and trade of financial products), without using a commodity as an intermediate step. In Marxist terminology, this is expressed as M-M' (money creating different money), as opposed to M-C-M' (money creating a commodity, which yields different money). Lazzarato also cites Lenin's work Imperialism, the Highest Stage of Capitalism to indicate the primacy of financial capitalism, emergent during Lenin's period.

Lazzarato concludes the text by proposing refusal of work as a technique for the disruption of the modern economy. He advocates for this goal because he attributes responsibility for human suffering during financial crises to capitalists and state actors, and not to any national population. However (in Lazzarato's account) national populations are nevertheless made to pay for such crises and socialized to feel responsibility for them, through taxation, austerity, and media messaging:

The state, technocratic governments, and the media [must therefore] invest considerable energy to ensure a population's guilt for a debt into which it has never entered and, therefore, its responsibility for faults it has never committed. The laws, speeches, articles, and slogans deployed to this end are directly proportional to the scope of the fraud. During the crisis, technocratic governments have moved to construct a memory of debt not for individuals but for entire nations. The violence of taxes and appropriations is the privileged instrument, for only that which inflicts pain is engraved in memory, only that which hurts registers and remains inscribed in consciousness (Nietzsche).

— Governing by Debt, p. 42.

== Capital Hates Everyone and The Intolerable Present ==
In the early 2020s, Lazzarato published another pair of closely related works, centering on the theme of anti-capitalism. Capital Hates Everyone is an anti-capitalist polemic, while The Intolerable Present, the Urgency of Revolution is a text which argues for the necessity of global revolution, and also for a need to incorporate race and sex into the classical Marxist conception of history, which instead focuses on class.

In Capital Hates Everyone, Lazzarato claims that the installation of a liberal or neoliberal form of government is a necessary but insufficient condition for capitalism to operate in a given country or region. In order for capitalism to function, he claims that it is also necessary for a historical conflict to take place, which then creates a class of defeated "losers" who are then either subsumed into capitalism or killed. Examples include victims of European colonialism and the Atlantic slave trade, victims of the Chilean Pinochet government—supported by the United States—and other leftists or revolutionaries who are defeated in historical conflicts. In the polemic, Lazzarato therefore attributes several negative traits to capitalism, arguing that warfare, racism and other negative phenomena are not incidental to the functioning of capitalism, but essential to it.

Lazzarato also examines the concept of the machine as it relates both to capitalism and anti-capitalist movements. In one example, Lazzarato cites Frantz Fanon to indicate the importance of radio broadcasts throughout the Algerian War. Initially used by the French as a tool for French state messaging within Algeria, radio broadcasts were later appropriated by Algerian militants to communicate their own anti-colonial messaging. Although Lazzarato discusses technical machines such as the radio, he also points to "social machines" or "war machines", borrowing the latter concept from A Thousand Plateaus, a work by the philosophers Gilles Deleuze and Felix Guattari. For Lazzarato, social machines and war machines refer not to literal, technical machines, but rather to human organizations whose members share certain worldviews, ideas or ideologies, and therefore work together to accomplish specific goals. This process gives rise to the use or invention of some technical machines for the purpose of realizing the organization's goals, and Lazzarato therefore attaches greater importance to social/war machines than to technical machines. In the above example, the French government sought to maintain control of Algeria, and therefore used the (already existing) technology of radio as a tool to aid this goal. The technical machine, radio, was later appropriated by another war machine—the Algerian militants—for their contrary goal of Algerian independence.

In The Intolerable Present, Lazzarato argues that the ordinary functioning of capitalism depends not only on the waged labor of the (male European) proletariat, but also requires a steady influx of unpaid or underpaid labor from other sectors of the global population for its social reproduction. These other sectors include slave labor carried out by black slaves captured during the Atlantic slave trade, unpaid "women's work" performed in many households, and underpaid labor performed by workers throughout the "periphery" of the Global South, all of which aid the functioning of capitalism in the "center" of the Global North. According to Lazzarato, these forms of labor and oppression are not typically emphasized by classical or orthodox Marxism, which instead focuses on the relationship between the bourgeoisie and the proletariat in Europe. He therefore argues that classical Marxist ideology must be revised in order to account for phenomena based in race and sex, in order to better understand the functioning of capitalism as a global phenomenon.

Lazzarato also notes that Marx's prediction that proletarian revolution would occur first in developed, Western European countries was historically proven false by the revolutions which occurred in Russia, China, Vietnam, Cuba, and throughout Africa. According to Lazzarato, the people in these regions could not afford to wait for ideal revolutionary conditions to develop, a notion associated with classical, European Marxism. Rather, they were variously forced to make immediate revolutionary breaks because their given circumstances were "intolerable", per the book's title word:

The time for action by free labor revolutions was no longer the future, as it was for the European labor movement in the nineteenth century, but the present, raising questions for historicism and the socialists' confidence in progress. The urgency of the here and now meant that revolution could not wait for any technological gap to be filled, or to catch up in terms of development, because the violence, exploitation and misery were intolerable!

— The Intolerable Present, the Urgency of Revolution, p. 103.

Toward the end of The Intolerable Present, Lazzarato acknowledges the concept of intersectionality—due to Kimberlé Crenshaw—which posits that an individual may experience multiple forms of discrimination due to simultaneous membership in distinct demographic groups: e.g. a black woman may simultaneously experience racism because she is black, and sexism because she is a woman. Although Lazzarato acknowledges that the idea of intersectionality is pertinent to his discussion, he expresses preference for the Combahee River Collective Statement, a manifesto issued in 1977 by a group of American black lesbian women. The Combahee River Collective Statement briefly outlines its members' experiences in American social movements centering on race and sex, particularly the civil rights movement and second-wave feminism. For Lazzarato, whereas the concept of intersectionality is closely associated with an American juridical context, the Combahee River Collective Statement has greater revolutionary potential, because it entails simultaneously struggling against racism and sexism, two forms of discrimination which Lazzarato argues support capitalism on a global level.

As in his earlier works on debt, Lazzarato concludes by advocating for refusal of work as a technique to halt the functioning of capitalism.

== Works ==
- "Immaterial Labor." In: Virno, Paolo, and Michael Hardt. 2010. Radical thought in Italy: A Potential Politics. Minneapolis, Minn. [u.a.]: Univ. of Minnesota Press.
- Marcel Duchamp et le refus du travail; (suivi de :) Misère de la sociologie. 2014 Paris: Les Prairies ordinaires.
- The Making of the Indebted Man. 2012. South Pasadena, CA: Semiotext(e).
- Signs and Machines: Capitalism and the Production of Subjectivity. 2014. Los Angeles: Semiotext(e).
- Governing by Debt. 2015. South Pasadena, CA: Semiotext(e).
- "Neoliberalism, the Financial Crisis and the End of the Liberal State." Theory, Culture & Society. December 1, 2015. 32, 67-83.
- Alliez, Eric, and Maurizio Lazzarato. 2016. Guerres et capital. Paris: Editions Amsterdam.
- Guerra e moneta: Imperialismo del dollaro, neoliberalismo, rotture rivoluzionarie. 2023. DeriveApprodi.
- War and Money: The Imperialism of the Dollar. 2025. Verso Publishers. Translated by Jason Francis McGimsey.

== Sources ==
- Charbonneau, M., & Hansen, M. P. (2014). Debt, Neoliberalism and Crisis: Interview with Maurizio Lazzarato on the Indebted Condition. Sociology, 48(5), 1039-1047.
