= Eat Your Mind =

2022 book by Jason McBride

Eat Your Mind: The Radical Life and Work of Kathy Acker
- Author: Jason McBride
- Language: English
- Subject: Kathy Acker
- Publisher: Simon & Schuster
- Publication date: November 29, 2022
- Pages: 416
- ISBN: 978-1-9821-1702-3

Eat Your Mind: The Radical Life and Work of Kathy Acker is a 2022 book by Jason McBride that examines the life of Kathy Acker.
