= Jennifer Doyle =

American art historian

Jennifer Doyle is a Professor of English at the University of California, Riverside. She is a queer theorist, art critic and sports writer.

Doyle is the author of Campus Sex, Campus Security (2015), which explores the intersection of discourse on sexual harassment and campus security, Hold it Against Me: Difficulty and Emotion in Contemporary Art (2013), which examines how artists work with emotion, and Sex Objects: Art and the Dialectics of Desire (2006), which considers how artworks are about sex. Along with José Esteban Muñoz and Jonathan Flatley, Doyle is co-editor of Pop Out: Queer Warhol (1996). She is also widely known for her feminist sports blogs, "From a Left Wing" (2007–2013) and "The Sports Spectacle." She was a co-host for KPFK Los Angeles's "The People's Game," a daily podcast for the 2010 FIFA World Cup, and wrote online commentary for Fox Soccer during the 2011 FIFA Women's World Cup.

From 2002 to 2005 she DJ'd for Vaginal Davis's weekly club Bricktops as "Pirate Jenny de Montpellier." She is currently a member of the volunteer collective which runs the artspace Human Resources Los Angeles.

Doyle has taught American literature, visual culture and queer theory at the University of California, Riverside since 1999. In 2012, Doyle won an Arts Writers Grant from Creative Capital | The Warhol Foundation. She was also the 2013-2014 Fulbright Distinguished Chair at the University of the Arts, London.

== Campus Sex, Campus Security ==
One of Doyle's works is Campus Sex, Campus Security, a book-length essay which examines incidents of sexual assault, police brutality and student protest at American university campuses, together with the security and administrative systems which manage them. The piece is divided into 21 sections and a prologue. Drawing on several sensationalized 21st century news stories with the above themes, the book describes a culture in which individual university members—students, faculty and staff—and college campuses themselves mirror each other in terms of fear of violation. Campuses establish security and administration which are meant to protect the university from legal violation (as opposed to personal victimization), and also use complaint procedures which may re-traumatize individual victims. In the account, campus security and administrative departments often create the same problems that they are meant to solve.

The work's narrative centers on the 2011 UC Davis pepper spray incident in which campus police used pepper spray to disperse an Occupy-aligned student demonstration against rising tuition. Working backwards, Doyle elaborates the Davis incident's underlying causes. As a result of Title IX, American public universities are legally required to maintain campuses which do not discriminate against students on the basis of sex. This entails that they maintain campuses free of sexual violence—under threat of losing government funding—per the Dear Colleague letter issued by the United States Department of Education to public university administrators on April 4, 2011. In Doyle's account, UC Davis administrator Linda Katehi feared that the demonstration would attract nearby Occupy Oakland protestors from outside the student body. If the demonstration had been allowed to encamp overnight, Katehi believed that Occupy Oakland protesters might have sex with students, possibly resulting in a sexual assault on campus. Based upon this concern motivated by Title IX requirements, Katehi insisted that campus police disperse the protest before nightfall, resulting in the pepper spray incident:

Kroll Security's report on "the pepper spray incident" tells us that campus police had been sent there by the university's Chancellor, Linda Katehi. In an interview with Kroll investigators, Katehi explained that the administration was worried about "non-affiliates" on campus. Non-affiliates from Oakland.

'We were worried at the time about that [non-affiliates] because the issues from Oakland were in the news and the use of drugs and sex and other things, and you know here we have very young students... we were worried especially about having very young girls and other students with older people who come from the outside without any knowledge of their record... if anything happens to any student while we're in violation of policy, it's a very tough thing to overcome.'

On the surface of her testimony, the Chancellor worries that Occupy Davis might turn into Occupy Oakland. A metonymic chain of associations accumulates (Oakland [black people], drugs, sex, young girls, older people, outsiders, violation) to bring the Chancellor to her fear: "older people from outside" interacting with "very young girls".

The administration's paranoid rape fantasy mirrors the geometry of the university community itself—what is a campus but older people, working with younger people?

— Campus Sex, Campus Security, pp. 15-16.

Throughout the book, Doyle also treats several other sensationalized incidents pertaining to campus security, including the retracted Rolling Stone article A Rape on Campus, the suicide of Tyler Clementi, the UCLA Taser incident, the Penn State child sex abuse scandal, and the 2014 Isla Vista killings, examining each from a feminist perspective.
