= Hedi El Kholti =

Moroccan-born American writer and editor

Hedi El Kholti (born February 24, 1967, in Rabat, Morocco) is a Moroccan-born American writer and editor, based in Los Angeles. He is co-editor of Semiotext(e) alongside Chris Kraus and Sylvère Lotringer. He was partner at the now defunct Dilettante Press and currently edits Semiotext(e)’s ‘occasional intellectual journal’ Animal Shelter. He is a graduate of the Art Center College of Design.

Since c. 2012, El Kholti has been in a relationship with the Irish novelist Colm Tóibín. They share a home in the Highland Park neighborhood of Los Angeles.

== Bibliography ==
- Animal Shelter 1 (Semiotext(e), 2008)
- Animal Shelter 2 (Semiotext(e), 2012)
- Animal Shelter 3 (Semiotext(e), 2013)
