= François Cusset =

French historian

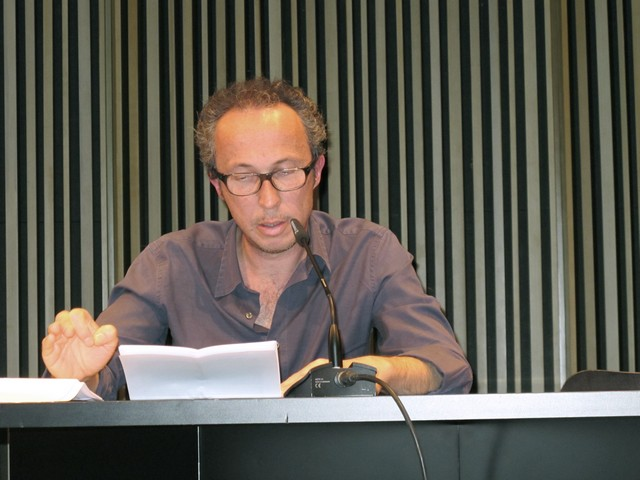
- François Cusset during a seminar at MACBA.
- Born: 9 March 1969 (age 57); Boulogne-Billancourt, France

Academic background
- Education: École normale supérieure de lettres et sciences humaines

Academic work
- Discipline: Intellectual history American civilisation
- Institutions: University of Nanterre

François Cusset (French: [kysɛ]; born 9 March 1969) is a writer, intellectual historian, and Professor of American Civilisation at the University of Nanterre.

Cusset was a student at the Ecole Normale Superieure de Saint-Cloud. He has been an associate researcher at The National Center of Scientific Research (Centre national de la recherche scientifique or CNRS), teacher of contemporary French culture at Reid Hall, and professor at the Institut d'Études Politiques de Paris. He is the brother of the writer Catherine Cusset.

== How the World Swung to the Right ==
One of Cusset's works is How the World Swung to the Right, a short treatise which examines the ascendancy of Right-wing politics from Cusset's own Left-wing perspective. Taking the election of Donald Trump as his starting point, Cusset describes it as one of many indicators of a rightward shift in world politics which also include Brexit, the governments of Vladimir Putin, Rodrigo Duterte and Recep Tayyip Erdogan, and the conservative regimes of Iran and Saudi Arabia. Cusset describes these situations as the culmination of a fifty-year historical process; fifty years earlier, the late 1960s were dominated by several "Left" features such as the pre-eminence of the western welfare state, the French protests of May 1968, the anti-Vietnam War protest movement and the prevalence of communist states. Cusset focuses on the three decades of the 1980s, the 1990s and the 2000s to explain the alleged rightward shift, examining their political and technological developments.

The 1980s were characterized by the election of conservative leaders such as Ronald Reagan, Margaret Thatcher and Helmut Kohl, who implemented neoliberal policies; for example, Thatcher's government opposed the UK miners' strike of 1984–85. In technology, the decade yielded the personal computer and the businesses which capitalized on its rise, such as Microsoft and Apple. The transition from the 1980s to the 1990s saw the fall of the Berlin Wall and the dissolution of the Soviet Union, events which prompted thinkers such as Francis Fukuyama (in Cusset's account) to declare the victory of liberal democracy and free market economies over socialist governments. Cusset criticized this view as a form of ex post facto triumphalism. (Note: "The first effect of the collapse of the Eastern Bloc on the Western elites was a kind of relief, an ideological and doctrinal disinhibition that would suddenly boost audiences for neoliberal ideologues, for historical anticommunists, and for defenders of market democracy from the Atlanticist camp of the Cold War (that is, from Western Europe and North America). In the 1980s the radical fringe of these ideologues, favorable to global denationalization and to suppressing all forms of social aid, had remained in the minority. From that point on, however, they would be able to force themselves upon the ruling classes. It was as if a single unexpected geopolitical event justified the most doctrinaire of ideologues.") In technology, the 1990s saw the rise of cell phones and the internet. Although the 1990s saw a nascent wave of Left alter-globalization as demonstrated by the Zapatistas and the 1999 Seattle WTO protests, this leftward shift was cut short by the September 11 attacks, the dividing line between the 1990s and the 2000s. Technologically, the decade produced a refinement of the internet via Web 2.0.

In Cusset's account, although technology is a neutral category which can be deployed for any end, its development and use in capitalism reinforce the latter, also precluding Left thought and activity: "Incidentally, using our cellphones to measure our heartbeats and the number of steps we take during our morning jog means we are less available to the idea and to the practice of social change. There is also an energetic calculation to this. Energy invested in sports is energy that is taken away from all direct socio-political forms of action."

Cusset concludes the work by examining the "period of mourning" in which leftist academics appeared to be discredited, citing examples of formerly leftist thinkers such as David Horowitz and Irving Kristol who "exorcised the 'red devil' who had supposedly possessed them in their early youth." Finally, Cusset proposes "countering the Right without seizing power", a concept articulated by the sociologist John Holloway, which is closely related to autonomism. (Note: Additionally, Cusset describes the concept as destituent. This usage is central to the book Now, by The Invisible Committee.) Cusset finds the concept at work in the Zapatista movement, Occupy Wall Street, and early 21st-century protest movements.

== Bibliography ==
- Queer Critics: La littérature française déshabillée par ses homo-lecteurs, PUF, 2002.
- La décennie : Le grand cauchemar des années 1980, La Découverte, 2006.
- French Theory: How Foucault, Derrida, Deleuze, & Co Transformed the Intellectual Life of the United States, University Of Minnesota Press, 2008.
- The Inverted Gaze: Queering the French Literary Classics in America, Arsenal Pulp Press, 2011.
- How the World Swung to the Right: Fifty Years of Counterrevolutions, Semiotext(e), 2018 (English translation).
