= The Coming Insurrection =

French political tract

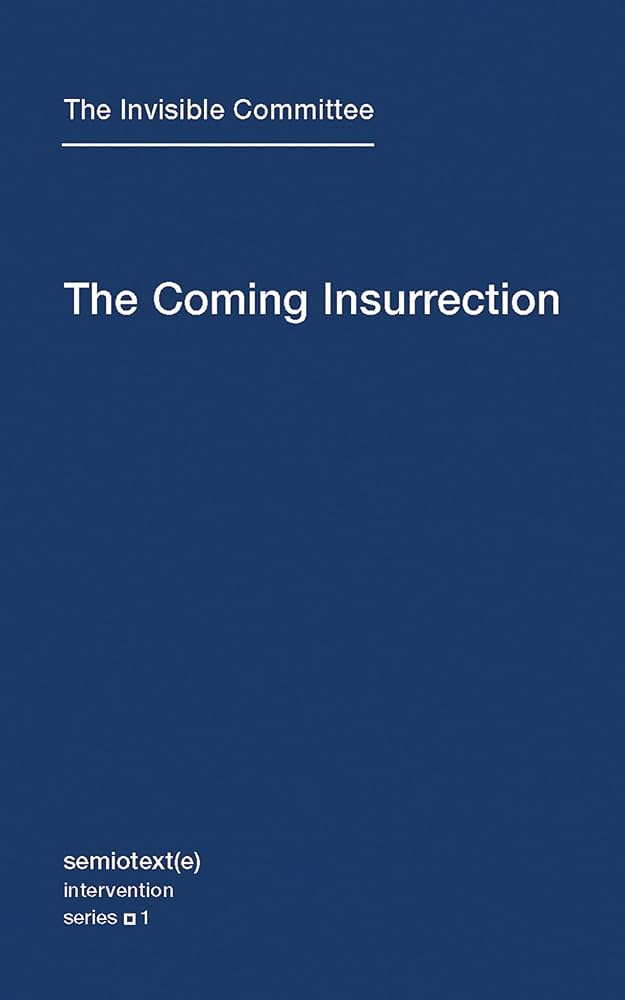
- Author: The Invisible Committee
- Original title: L’insurrection Qui Vient
- Language: French, translated into English
- Series: (English): Semiotext(e) Intervention Series
- Release number: (English): 1
- Subject: Political philosophy
- Genre: Anarchism
- Publisher: Editions La Fabrique, Semiotext(e)
- Publication date: 2007
- Publication place: France
- English publication date: 2009
- Media type: Print (Paperback)
- Pages: 128 (French), 136 (English)
- ISBN: 978-1-58435-080-4
- OCLC: 423751089
- Followed by: To Our Friends
- Website: "La Fabrique Editions". "Semiotext(e)".

The Coming Insurrection is a French radical leftist, tiqqunist tract written by The Invisible Committee, the nom de plume of an anonymous author (or possibly authors). It hypothesizes the "imminent collapse of capitalist culture". The Coming Insurrection was first published in 2007 by Editions La Fabrique, and later (2009) translated into English and published by Semiotext(e). Last Word Press in Olympia, Washington also published an edition. The book is notable for the media coverage which it received as an example of a radical leftist manifesto, particularly from American conservative commentator Glenn Beck. The Coming Insurrection is also known for its association with the legal case of the Tarnac Nine, a group of nine young people including Julien Coupat who were arrested in Tarnac, rural France, on 11 November 2008 "on the grounds that they were to have participated in the sabotage of overhead electrical lines on France's national railways". The Tarnac Nine were variously accused of conspiracy, sabotage, terrorism, and being the author(s) of The Coming Insurrection.

The Coming Insurrection is followed by To Our Friends (2015), and Now (2017).

== Synopsis ==
In its original incarnation, The Coming Insurrection consisted of twelve chapters, together with a brief afterword. The English edition of the book was published after the Tarnac Nine arrests, and therefore includes a brief foreword and introduction which touch on the subject of the arrests, for a total of fifteen parts.

The book is divided into two halves. The first half attempts a diagnosis of the totality of modern capitalist civilization, moving through what the Committee identify as the "seven circles" of alienation, induced by states and capitalism: alienation relating to the self, to social relations, to work, to the urban, to the economy, to the environment, and finally to the state itself.

Beginning in Get Going!, the second half of the book presents a prescription for revolutionary struggle based on the formation of communes, or affinity group-style units, which will build their forces outside of mainstream politics, and attack conventional powers (states, businesses, the police) in moments of crisis – political, social, environmental – to foment anti-capitalist revolution. The insurrection envisioned by the Committee entails local appropriation of power by the people, physical blocking of the economy, and rendering police actions irrelevant.

For examples, the book notes the 2008 financial crisis and environmental degradation as symptoms of capitalism's decline. Also discussed are the Argentine economic crisis (1999-2002) and the piquetero movement which emerged from it, the 2005 riots and 2006 student protests in France, the 2006 Oaxaca protests, and the grassroots relief work in New Orleans after Hurricane Katrina. These events serve as examples both of breakdown in the modern, conventional social order, and at the same time of the capacity of human beings to spontaneously self-organize for revolutionary ends, which taken together can give rise to partial insurrectionary situations.

=== Foreword ===
"The book you hold in your hands has become the principal piece of evidence in an anti-terrorism case in France directed against nine individuals who were arrested on November 11, 2008, mostly in the village of Tarnac. They have been accused of 'criminal association for the purposes of terrorist activity' on the grounds that they were to have participated in the sabotage of overhead electrical lines on France’s national railways. Although only scant circumstantial evidence has been presented against the nine, the French Interior Minister has publicly associated them with the emergent threat of an 'ultra-left' movement, taking care to single out this book, described as a 'manual for terrorism,' which they are accused of authoring. What follows is the text of the book preceded by the first statement of the Invisible Committee since the arrests."

=== Introduction: A Point Of Clarification ===
The introduction describes contemporary civil unrest in Greece and France, and encourages situations which may lead to revolution. The book's association with the Tarnac Nine is obliquely acknowledged, but not confirmed in terms of authorship. For the author(s), the political goal of the book is a form of communism, although the author(s) intend that word in a simpler sense which is related to, but distinct from, its historical one. The introduction, specifically, is signed and dated: "—Invisible Committee, January 2009".

=== From Whatever Angle... ===
The world is sick. "Everyone agrees that things can only get worse." Social unrest exists everywhere, and is officially blamed on economic crises and nihilistic youth. On the contrary, the author(s) intimate that states, capitalism, and the world economy themselves are the true root causes of the above problems, which really derive from the alienation which they naturally create, to be sketched immediately.

=== First Circle: "I Am What I Am" ===
The first circle presents a criticism of the promotion of individualism in advertising — "It's dizzying to see Reebok's "I AM WHAT I AM" enthroned atop a Shanghai skyscraper." — which leads people to define themselves in terms of their possessions, their internet profiles and so on, as opposed to meaningful interactions with other human beings. The result is "Atomization into fine paranoiac particles." On the other hand, the author(s) emphasize connections and ties as giving meaning and reality to human existence: "What am I? Tied in every way to places, sufferings, ancestors, friends, loves, events, languages, memories, to all kinds of things that obviously are not me."

=== Second Circle: "Entertainment Is A Vital Need" ===
French society, and specifically the modern French secular state, are characterized as atomizing individuals into the essential category of citizen (for the author(s), a blank category not implying social ties). Meanwhile, social relations are also hollowed out by capitalism (transactional couple-relationships of convenience, perhaps for career advancement, "work buddies" as opposed to true friendships, etc.). The end result is a poverty of social relations, which now lack "warmth, simplicity, truth".

=== Third Circle: "Life, Health And Love Are Precarious-Why Should Work Be An Exception?" ===
The precariat and the schizophrenic French attitude towards work (valorizing and hating it at the same time) are analyzed. The theme is work, as in the case of the refusal of work, and how work affects all other categories of life (romantic relationships, friendships, "time off"). Ironically work, and the social dignity which it is supposed to confer, "has totally triumphed over all other ways of existing, at the same time as workers have become superfluous. Gains in productivity, outsourcing, mechanization, automated and digital production have so progressed that they have almost reduced to zero the quantity of living labor necessary in the manufacture of any product." For the author(s), one implication of this is that wage labor will not readily be replaced by other forms of social control (apart from surveillance, the technology for which is intensifying), so that the possibilities for insurrection will increase.

=== Fourth Circle: "More Simple, More Fun, More Mobile, More Secure!" ===
The city and the country are contrasted, but the metropolis is a metaphor for capitalist, statist political reality which now permeates all territories and physical spaces, whether rural, urban, or otherwise. Architecture and urbanism are thus entailed, and the chapter cites examples of urban warfare, foreshadowing the book's later explicit militant project. "Israeli soldiers have become interior designers. Forced by Palestinian guerrillas to abandon the streets, which had become too dangerous, they learned to advance vertically and horizontally into the heart of the urban architecture, poking holes in walls and ceilings in order to move through them."

=== Fifth Circle: "Fewer Possessions, More Connections!" ===
The world economy and, according to the author(s), the world's contempt for it (specifically the World Bank and IMF) are discussed. "We have to see that the economy is not "in" crisis, the economy is itself the crisis." Environmentalist and zero-growth or negative-growth concepts, lately adopted by various economists and corporations, are presented as being merely cynical adjustments on their parts, without altruism.

=== Sixth Circle: "The Environment Is An Industrial Challenge" ===
Environmentalism and the effects of global warming are generally discussed. Again, the author(s) dismiss the recent practice of businesses factoring environmental considerations into their plans, as being cynical: "The situation is like this: they hired our parents to destroy this world, and now they'd like to put us to work rebuilding it, and—to add insult to injury—at a profit." The word environment itself is further dismissed as a cold, clinical word, the use of which indicates an alienated detachment of modern humans from the world in which they live. The purpose of the chapter is not to say that the author(s) are unconcerned for the natural world (they clearly lament extinction of fish species, among other examples), but rather to disdain the historical hypocrisy which they ascribe to businesses and states about environmental issues. Continuing with the theme, one positive example of insurrectionary possibility is cited: following Hurricane Katrina, New Orleans volunteers and residents established the Common Ground Clinic among other grassroots efforts, and at the same time resisted outside efforts aimed at (per the author(s)) reappropriation of the territory in the wake of a disaster, with a view towards long-term gentrification.

=== Seventh Circle: "We Are Building A Civilized Space Here" ===
Civilization and states, specifically the French state, are described as being upheld by hypocritical violence. "The first global slaughter, which from 1914 to 1918 did away with a large portion of the urban and rural proletariat, was waged in the name of freedom, democracy, and civilization. For the past five years, the so-called 'War on Terror' with its special operations and targeted assassinations has been pursued in the name of these same values." According to the author(s), states and civilization as we know it, are on their way out: "There is no 'clash of civilizations.' There is a clinically dead civilization kept alive by all sorts of life-support machines that spread a peculiar plague into the planet’s atmosphere."

=== Get Going! ===
Beginning the second half, Get Going! is the book's shortest chapter, barely more than a page, and marks a militant pivot in the book's rhetoric. Against all the foregoing lamented alienations of modern life, conventional forms of political organization are held to be useless, because they would by definition mimic the existing powers already held in contempt by the author(s). What is needed is insurrection, and right now — a kind of urgency, or presentism, a youthful theme of impatience which reappears in later works by the Committee. The English back cover's blurb is taken from this very brief chapter: "It's useless to wait—for a breakthrough, for the revolution, the nuclear apocalypse or a social movement. To go on waiting is madness. The catastrophe is not coming, it is here. We are already situated within the collapse of a civilization. It is within this reality that we must choose sides."

=== Find Each Other ===
The chapter is a revolutionary prescription, in four pieces of advice to the reader: First, "Attach yourself to what you feel to be true. Begin there." Next, make genuine friendships which have a basis in shared politics, avoid official organizations and established milieus, and above all form communes, which for the author(s) are simply common groups of people, living in close proximity, and centered around specific places and particularly causes.

=== Get Organized ===
Communes should be formed, and their maintenance can and should be supported by various forms of civil disobedience and crime, which are simultaneously intended to strengthen the communes, and to sap strength from states and businesses: refusal of work, welfare cheating, fraud generally (especially of other government programs), and shoplifting among others. Anonymity is to be held onto for as long as possible, while the communes' strength grows. Police, eventually, are to be fought, along increasingly militant rhetorical lines.

In particular, Get Organized contains a passage which has been directly associated with the Tarnac Nine case, and which seems to anticipate the TGV rail sabotages of the case (which occurred after The Coming Insurrection's original publication date of 2007), as reported in an article by Alberto Toscano:

Information and energy circulate via wire networks, fibers and channels, and these can be attacked. Nowadays sabotaging the social machine with any real effect involves reappropriating and reinventing the ways of interrupting its networks. How can a TGV line or an electrical network be rendered useless? How does one find the weak points in computer networks, or scramble radio waves and fill screens with white noise?

— The Invisible Committee, The Coming Insurrection, p. 112.

=== Insurrection ===
Finally, an overall insurrectionary strategy is presented. Use crises to your own benefit (as conventional powers do), shun the "democratic assemblies" of protest movements (which accomplish little, a theme regularly revisited by the Committee in later works), block the economy, block the police, take up arms (and avoid the need of their use except at the last resort), and depose local authority where feasible. When, finally, the military rolls in, a political victory of some kind must be achieved over them, because a conventional military victory is not tenable. The text closes, just before a brief afterword, with the injunction: "All power to the communes!"

=== Afterword ===
An impressionistic paragraph is sketched, in which conventional power is slowly crumbling, and insurgents face their new challenges with hope. "The radio keeps the insurgents informed of the retreat of the government forces. A rocket has just breached a wall of the Clairvaux Prison. Impossible to say if it has been months or years since the 'events' began. And the prime minister seems very alone in his appeals for calm."

== Influences ==
A few of the Tarnac Nine were involved in producing Tiqqun, a French radical philosophy journal printed from 1999 to 2001. Tiqqun was steeped in the tradition of radical French intellectuals which includes Michel Foucault, Georges Bataille, the Situationist International, Gilles Deleuze, and Félix Guattari. The Coming Insurrection bears traces of influence from the works of these philosophers, and also, most notably, Giorgio Agamben's notions of the whatever singularity and being-in-common, and Alain Badiou's ontology of the event and truth procedures. Its analysis of capitalist civilization is clearly informed by Foucault's and Agamben's notion of biopower, Guy Debord's society of the spectacle, and Antonio Negri's concept of Empire.

== Reception ==
The book was mentioned in The New York Times and also in the anti-consumerist magazine Adbusters in relation to the Tarnac Nine. In an interview with The Hollywood Reporter, Michael Moore mentioned the book as being the most recent one he had read.

In September 2010, Coline Struyf from the National Theatre of Belgium adapted the book to theatre.

Glenn Beck, host of The Glenn Beck Program, has at various times recognized the book as, "crazy" and "evil". Beck has also urged his viewers to order the book online themselves, so as to better understand what he claimed were the thoughts of leftist radicals.

== In popular culture ==
Science fiction author Jeff VanderMeer writes in the acknowledgements of his novel Acceptance that The Coming Insurrection served for one of the main character's thinking, "quoted or paraphrased on pages 241, 242, and 336."

== See also ==
- Anarchism in France
- Communization
- Julien Coupat – activist alleged by French police to be part of the Invisible Committee
- Insurrectionary anarchism
- The Invisible Committee
- Situationist International
- Tarnac Nine
- Tiqqun
- List of books about anarchism
