= Appellistes =

Political ideology

The appellistes were an autonomist political tendency that emerged in the early 21st century. Classified within post-situationist thought, it takes its name from L'Appel ('The Call'), a book by the Invisible Committee published in 2004. This autonomous current influenced several organizations and movements, particularly Les Soulèvements de la Terre and the ZAD of Notre-Dame-des-Landes. Closely linked to Julien Coupat and the Tarnac Nine, it has also played a crucial role in the development of the black bloc strategy in France.

Despite its contributions and influence, the appelliste movement is also a controversial force within the far left, notably due to its theoretical positions which are accused of being a reactionary bourgeois idealization of the Revolution, its decision to negotiate with the state during the Notre-Dame-des-Landes ZAD, and the authoritarian and party-like character attributed to the movement. In particular, appellistes and anarchists are openly in conflict, with tensions between the two groups sometimes escalating to physical violence among activists.

== History ==
The appellistes refer to themselves using this term in reference to L'Appel ('The Call'), a book published by the future members of the Invisible Committee in 2004. The term tiqquniens is also used, referring to the philosophical journal Tiqqun, where the core of this movement initially wrote. When philosopher Tristan Garcia reflects on what characterizes the appellistes, he describes them as a movement seeking immediate insurrection by breaking with the "aging structures of the workers' movement", and aiming for a "concrete" form of communism, distinct from "overly tame" union demands. Alexander Dunlap characterizes them as close to a kind of ecological Blanquism—that is, militants pursuing a revolutionary and environmental vanguard. For sociologist Philippe Corcuff, they represent a "galaxy" of activists influenced by post-situationist thought. In the 2000s, some of these militants were connected with Aragorn!, an Odawa anarchist active in the United States, but he eventually broke ties with them due to their 'sectarian nature'.

The appellistes influenced, supported, and integrated into the Zadist movement, alongside anarchists and anti-growth activists. They gained a notable presence during the ZAD de Notre-Dame-des-Landes and were partly responsible for introducing the black bloc tactic in France. Les Soulèvements de la Terre and the media outlet Lundimatin are connected to this current.

During the ZAD occupation at Notre-Dame-des-Landes, political divisions emerged between the appellistes, who gathered under the CMDO ('Committee for the Maintenance of Occupations'), and on the other hand, anti-authoritarians/anarchists and feminists. These groups also clashed over territorial and sociological lines: while the appellists generally came from more bourgeois activist circles and were based in the western part of the ZAD, their opponents tended to be from poorer backgrounds and located in the eastern part. The appellistes were notably accused of authoritarian behavior during the internal conflicts within the ZAD. In 2018, after the airport project at Notre-Dame-des-Landes was abandoned, the appellistes chose to negotiate with the French state and accepted the proposal made by the prefect and Nicolas Hulot to divide up the territory of the ZAD among all those who would declare their identity and specify their intended use of the land—thus enabling the state to grant them property rights on the land. This position caused a split among Zadists, with anarchists strongly opposing the decision, and the previously latent conflict took a more violent turn. The appellistes attacked one of their opponents, beating him at his home, locking him in the trunk of a car, and leaving him in front of the psychiatric hospital of Blain.

In 2023, when Julien Coupat—one of the main authors of the Invisible Committee—embraced conspiracy theories close to the far right in his new book Conspiracist Manifesto, and expressed the desire to reissue L'Appel under his sole name, this triggered major conflicts and interpersonal violence within the appellist movement itself.

== Critics ==
When the appelliste media outlet Numéro Zéro debated 'Appelism and antiappelist', it provided a list of accusations made against the appellistes within far-left circles and attempted to defend them. Among the accusations cited by Numéro Zéro are claims that the appellistes are authoritarian, seek to take control of social struggles through party-like structures, protect sexual abusers within their organizations, and were involved in the case of the activist who was beaten and locked in a car trunk. The outlet questions whether "appellisme" even exists as a coherent movement and tries to defend appellistes against these allegations.

As early as 2010, some anarchist publications described Tiqqunien thought as a romantic and bourgeois idealization of social struggles. For example, the anarchist platformist UCL wrote at the time that, in their view:

What characterizes the [appelliste] movement is a nostalgia for a mythologized traditional community, one that supposedly predates the ‘reign of the commodity'. This imaginary, with its reactionary undertones, does not hesitate to draw openly on a range of counter-revolutionary thinkers to support its critique of modernity.

== Bibliography ==
- CEP (2026), "Aragorn! [dit "Aragorn !", "Aragorn Bang"]", Dictionnaire international des militant·e·s anarchistes, Paris
