= Tiqqun =

French post-Marxist philosophical journal

Tiqqun was a French-Italian post-Marxist philosophical journal or zine, produced in two issues in February 1999 and October 2001. Topics treated in the journal's articles include anti-capitalism, anti-statism, Situationism, feminism, and the history of late 20th century revolutionary movements, especially May 1968 in France, the Italian Years of Lead, and the anti-globalization protests of the late 1990s and early 2000s. The journal's articles were written anonymously; as a result, the word "Tiqqun" is also used to name the articles' collective of authors, and other texts attributed to them.

The journal came to wider attention following the Tarnac Nine arrests of 2008, a police operation which detained nine people on suspicion of having conspired on recent sabotage of French electrical train lines. The arrested were accused of having written The Coming Insurrection, a political tract credited to The Invisible Committee, a distinct anonymous group named in the journal. Julien Coupat, one of the arrested, was a contributor to the first issue of Tiqqun.

The journal's articles are polemics against modern capitalist society, which the authors hold in contempt. Individual articles present diagnoses of specific aspects of modern society, drawing on ideas from continental philosophy, anthropology, and history. Guy Debord's concept of the Spectacle is used to explain how communication media and socialization processes support existing capitalist society, and Michel Foucault's concept of biopower is used to explain how states and businesses manage populations via their physical needs. The journal's articles introduce terminology for their topics, freely used throughout the other articles. A "Bloom" refers to an archetypal, alienated modern person or subject, named after the character Leopold Bloom from the James Joyce novel Ulysses. A "Young-Girl" refers to a person who participates in modern society and thereby reinforces it, exhibiting traits commonly associated with femininity. Although a "Bloom" frequently stands for a man and a "Young-Girl" frequently stands for a woman, the authors stress that the concepts are not gendered. The word Tiqqun is an alternate spelling of Tikkun olam, a Jewish theological concept which refers to repair or healing of the world. In the authors' context, Tiqqun refers to improvement of the human condition through the subversion of modern capitalist society.

Due to their philosophical influences, political content and historical context, the Tiqqun articles have received some attention in humanities scholarship and anarchist reading circles. Selected articles have been republished in several languages.

== Contents and authorship ==
The first issue of Tiqqun was published in February 1999 with the title Tiqqun, Organe conscient du Parti Imaginaire: Exercices de Métaphysique Critique (Tiqqun, Conscious Organ of the Imaginary Party: Exercises in Critical Metaphysics). The second issue was published in October 2001 with the title Tiqqun, Organe de liaison au sein du Parti Imaginaire: Zone d’Opacité Offensive (Tiqqun, Organ of Liaison within the Imaginary Party: Zone of Offensive Opacity). For simplicity the two issues are commonly referred to as Tiqqun 1 and Tiqqun 2, respectively.

Eleven articles were published in Tiqqun 1, and ten major articles were published in Tiqqun 2. (Note: Each issue had a table of contents for its main articles in the back; see the previous citations for these. Note that the second issue's table of contents did not list page numbers and ignored a group of nine small pieces placed between each main article (see below for details).) Additionally the first issue contained a one-page spread, and the second issue contained nine smaller pieces interspersed between each of its ten main articles, two-page spreads with black borders. (Note: See for example Dernier avertissement au parti imaginaire (Final Warning to the Imaginary Party), pp. 38-39 of Tiqqun 2. One exception to this rule was Ma noi ci saremo (But we'll be here), the final small piece, which instead ran for six pages.) In all 31 pieces were published in the journal, listed below in the order they originally appeared.

Due to their anonymity, Tiqqun's articles are not credited to individual authors; rather, they are simply attributed to the journal's namesake. However the first issue's back cover contained a colophon which listed the issue's editorial board as Julien Boudart, Fulvia Carnevale, Julien Coupat, Junius Frey, (Note: Junius Frey is a pseudonym, referring to the historical figure in Jewish messianism.) Joël Gayraud, Stephan Hottner and Rémy Ricordeau. (Note: The author's names and other identifying details were suppressed in the issue's English translation.) (Note: Some contact information was listed in the various editions of the articles. The second issue's original version provided a location in the 11th arrondisment as the address of the Society for the Advancement of Criminal Science or SACS, an entity related to the Tiqqun collective. In a preface to a stand-alone edition of Theory of Bloom, the address was given again as that of Tiqqun itself; the address has been described as a squat which was occupied at the time by the authors. The SACS gave contact e-mail also.)

The actor and philosopher Mehdi Belhaj Kacem briefly collaborated with the Tiqqun collective toward the end of its existence. In an interview, he noted that the group disbanded shortly after the September 11 attacks.

Articles of Tiqqun 1
Original French Title	English Translation
Eh bien, la guerre!	Of course you know, this means war!
Qu'est-ce que la Métaphysique Critique?	What is Critical Metaphysics?
Théorie du Bloom	Theory of Bloom
Phénoménologie de la vie quotidienne	Phenomenology of Everyday Life
Thèses sur le Parti Imaginaire	Theses on the Imaginary Party
Le silence et son au-delà	Silence and Beyond
De l'économie considérée comme magie noire	On the Economy Considered as Black Magic
Premiers matériaux pour une théorie de la Jeune-Fille	Preliminary Materials For a Theory of the Young-Girl
La théologie en 1999	Theology in 1999 (Note: The one-page spread. An advertisement for the French laundry service 5àsec is reproduced, showing actor Christophe Malavoy wearing a suit. In his own words, Malavoy looks "impeccable". A newly-added caption notes the etymology of the word: sinless, "not subject to sin".)
Hommes-machines, mode d'emploi	Machine-Men: User's Guide
Les métaphysiciens-critiques sous le «mouvement des chômeurs»	The Critical Metaphysicians beneath the "Unemployed Persons' movement"
Quelques actions d'éclat du Parti Imaginaire	A Few Scandalous Actions of the Imaginary Party

Articles of Tiqqun 2
Original French Title	English Translation
Introduction à la guerre civile	Introduction to Civil War
L'hypothèse cybernétique	The Cybernetic Hypothesis
Thèses sur la communauté terrible	Theses on the Terrible Community
Le problème de la tête	The Problem of the Head
«Une métaphysique critique pourrait naître comme science des dispositifs...»	"A critical metaphysics could emerge as a science of apparatuses..."
Rapport à la S.A.S.C. concernant un dispositif impérial	Report to the S.A.C.S. Concerning an Imperial Apparatus
Le petit jeu de l'homme d'Ancien Régime	The Little Game of the Man of the Old Regime
Échographie d'une puissance	Sonogram of a Potential
Ceci n'est pas un programme	This Is Not a Program
Comment faire?	How Is It to Be Done?

Minor pieces of Tiqqun 2 (Note: Each minor piece appeared between the issue's main articles in the order shown in both tables, e.g. Final Warning to the Imaginary Party appeared between Introduction to Civil War and The Cybernetic Hypothesis, The Conquerors had Conquered Without Trouble appeared between The Cybernetic Hypothesis and Theses on the Terrible Community, etc.)
Original French Title	English Translation
Dernier avertissement au parti imaginaire	Final Warning to the Imaginary Party
Les vainqueurs avaient vaincu sans peine	The Conquerors had Conquered Without Trouble
«Tout mouvement excède...»	Untitled Notes on Citizenship Papers
Ceux qui ne veulent pas du progrès, le progrès ne veut pas d'eux	Progress doesn't want Those that don't want Progress
Halte à la domestiCAFion!	Stop DomestiCAFion!
Notes sur le local	Notes on the Local
On a toujours l'âge de déserter	You're never too old to ditch out
Bonjour!	Hello!
Ma noi ci saremo (Note: An Italian phrase. The piece consists of a series of remarks on then-contemporary anti-globalization protests in Genoa, Prague and Seattle, and reproduces a flyer in parallel Italian and French.)	But we'll be here

== Themes ==
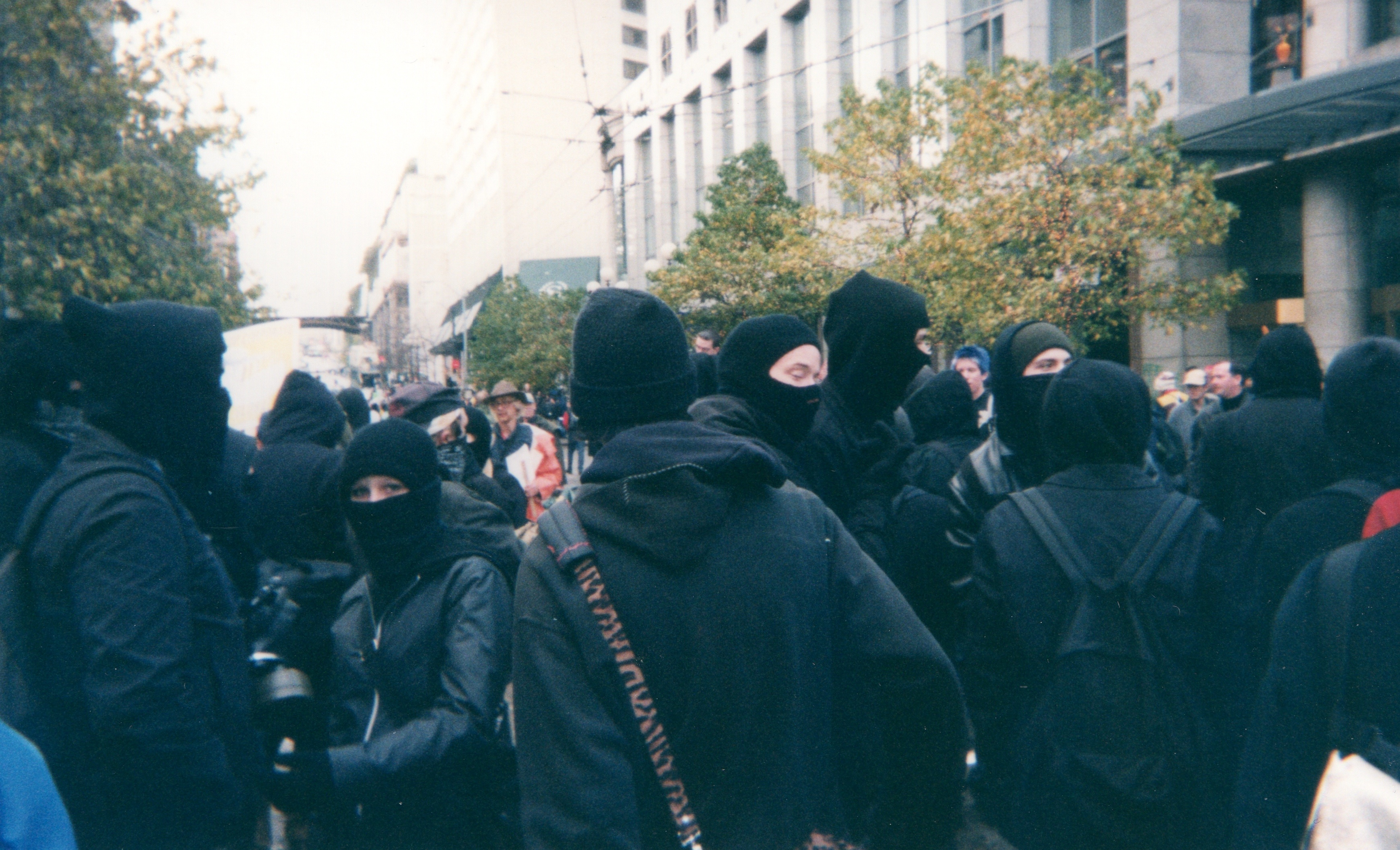
The authors described the Black bloc as a manifestation of the Imaginary Party

Tiqqun's articles pathologize modern capitalist society, introducing several terms used to describe social phenomena. The authors use the terms together to present an anti-capitalist, anti-statist worldview. Because of their contempt for modern society, the authors advocate insurrectionary anarchism, crime, and other methods intended to subvert it. The authors also indicate that people opposed to modern capitalist society may form meaningful community with each other based on their shared rejection of it.

According to the authors, the coordination of states and private businesses gives rise to modern capitalist society (Empire), which entails "commodity domination" of social interactions, supplanting authentic human community. This leads to several pathological sociological types: socially alienated people (Blooms), people who fully participate in society and thereby become commodities themselves (Young-Girls), people who criticize society without attempting to change it (Men of the Old Regime), and subcultures which seek to preserve themselves at the expense of their members' inability to be honest with each other (Terrible Communities). Historically, modern Western society transitioned from a period of liberal governance (the liberal hypothesis) to a period stressing social control using technology (the cybernetic hypothesis). Modern society uses two techniques to maintain its power and to reproduce itself: biopower is used to manage the physical needs of the population, while the Spectacle is an established form of discourse which reproduces modern society through its socialization in individuals.

Against this, the authors posit "critical metaphysics", an attitude which rejects modern society. Persons who reject modern society may meet in "planes of consistency", circumstances which allow like-minded people to encounter each other. Persons rejecting modern society form the Imaginary Party, an unorganized group who may coalesce around specific events of civil unrest. An example is the Black bloc, a practice—employed during anti-globalization protests and riots—of dressing in black and wearing face coverings. The authors describe "zones of offensive opacity" as places where people may meet to subvert modern society. The process through which such people meet and interact is described as Tiqqun.

The tone of the articles is frequently acerbic and sarcastic. The philosophers Thucydides, Thomas Hobbes and Martin Heidegger are described respectively as "that moron", "that piece of shit" and "swine", due to the authors' disagreements with their views. The Italian sociologist Antonio Negri is also frequently the subject of harsh criticism, due to his involvement in activism which the authors feel is too conciliatory to existing capitalist society. The articles are illustrated with reproductions of artwork and photography of riots and demonstrations.

== Synopsis ==
=== Tiqqun 1 ===
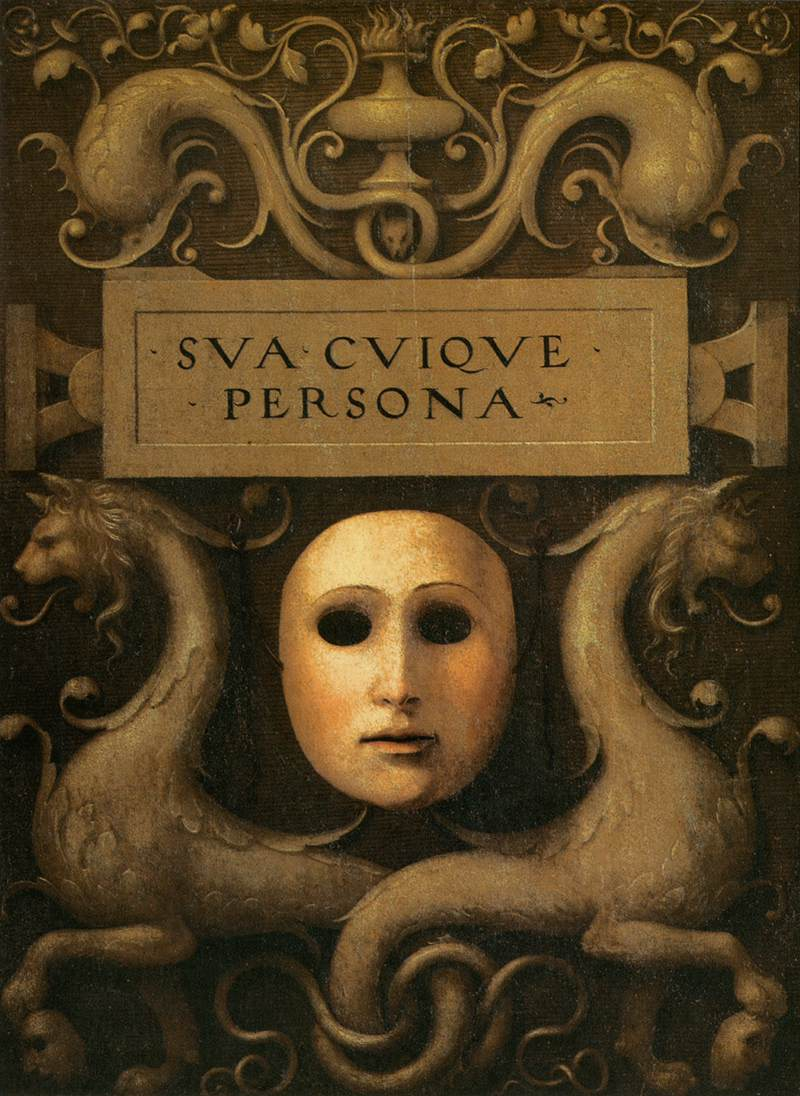
Portrait Cover with Grotesques, attributed to Ridolfo Ghirlandaio, was used as the first issue's frontispiece

The journal's first issue included a frontispiece depicting a traditional Italian mask set against the Latin inscription SUA CUIQUE PERSONA (To each their own mask); masks are used frequently as metaphorical devices throughout the issue. The frontispiece is a detail of Portrait Cover with Grotesques [it], an Italian Renaissance painting of uncertain origin, commonly attributed to Ridolfo Ghirlandaio. The painting functioned as a practical art object, intended as a cover for a portrait painting. Although its companion is also uncertain, Portrait Cover has become associated with the portrait Veiled Woman [it], also attributed to Ghirlandaio. The two artworks are exhibited together at the Uffizi Gallery in Florence.

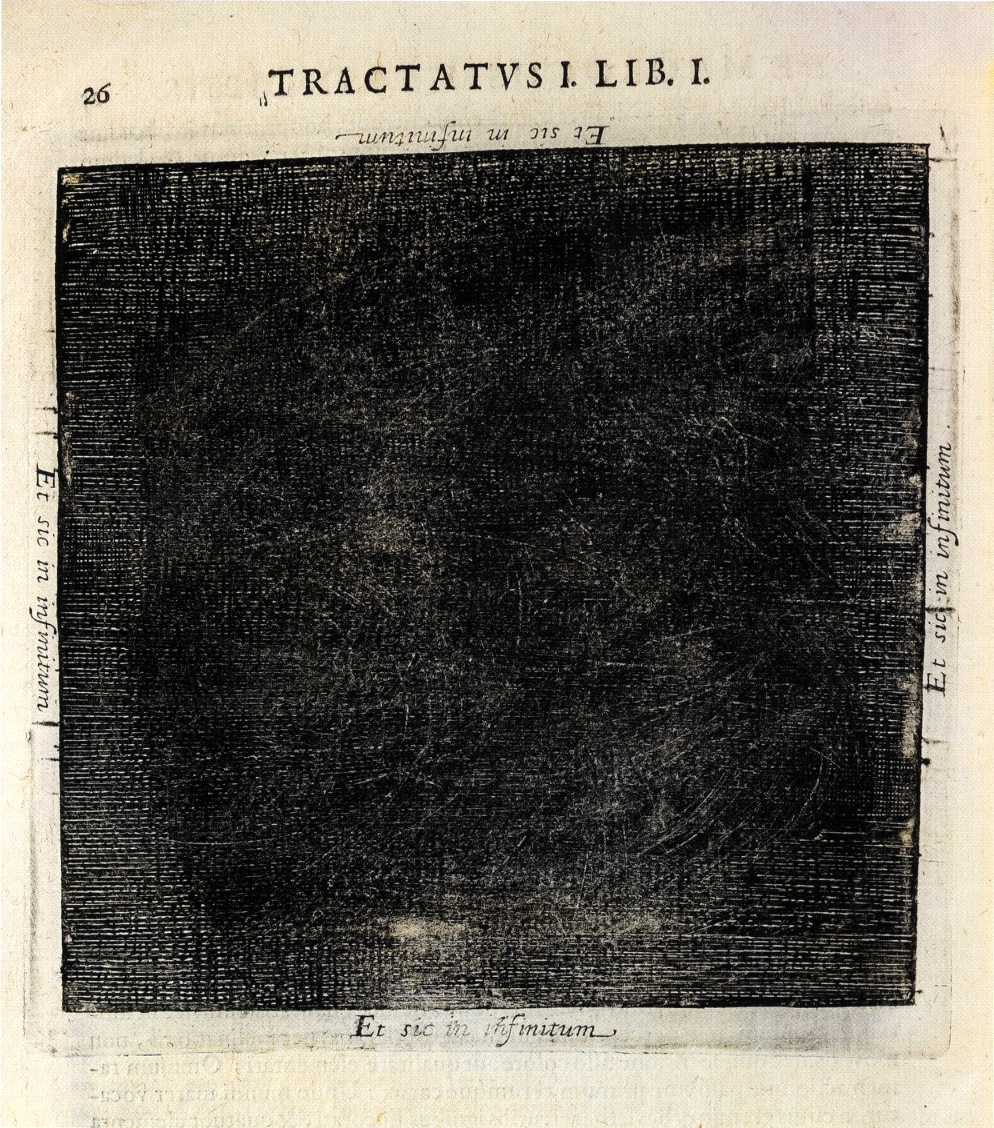
Robert Fludd's image of the Void as a black square, repeated Et sic in infinitum, was used for illustration

Of course you know, this means war! is a brief opening piece which sets out the authors' disgust with modern society, which they liken to the Situationist notion of the Spectacle, and also to the Kabbalistic notion of qlippoth (shells, husks), the latter being evil forces in Jewish mysticism. Against the prevailing social order, the authors propose Tiqqun, referring both to the Jewish concept of healing, and also to the journal itself. The piece is dated Venice, January 15, 1999. What is Critical Metaphysics? gives a description of its titular subject, which is opposed to "commodity domination", or commodity metaphysics. The article's title is a play on What is Metaphysics?, a lecture given by Heidegger in 1929. According to the authors, critical metaphysics is an irrepressable, anti-capitalist way of perceiving reality, which consumer culture, modernity and analytic philosophy have failed to eliminate. The authors stress that the concept is not academic, but practical: "Critical Metaphysics is in everyone's guts." Persons who engage in critical metaphysics are described as critical metaphysicians. In one passage, people who join to "politicize metaphysics" represent the emergence of "the coming insurrection of the Mind"; The Coming Insurrection was the title later given to the first work by The Invisible Committee. (Note: In the French, there are two similar but distinct versions of the phrase. The original French phrase appearing in this passage of the Tiqqun article was "la prochaine insurrection", or "the next insurrection". The book later published by the Invisible Committee bore the distinct title L'insurrection qui vient, or The Coming Insurrection.) Between articles an image of a black square was reproduced, taken from a work by the occult philosopher Robert Fludd. For Fludd, the black square represented the Void which preceded the Creation. The authors reproduced the image to illustrate surrounding themes of nothingness and night.

Mr Bloom watched curiously, kindly, the lithe black form. Clean to see: the gloss of her sleek hide, the white button under the butt of her tail, the green flashing eyes. He bent down to her, his hands on his knees.
—Milk for the pussens, he said.
—Mrkgnao! the cat cried.
They call them stupid. They understand what we say better than we understand them.

— Ulysses, as quoted at the beginning of Theory of Bloom

Beginning with a quotation from the James Joyce novel Ulysses, Theory of Bloom (Note: There are three versions of Theory of Bloom. The original version of the article appearing in Tiqqun 1 was later revised (Note: "[Therefore] we refine, sharpen, and clarify the Theory of Bloom.") for republication as a stand-alone volume. The revised version was translated into English by Robert Hurley; although it treated most of the same ideas, the revision permuted several passages and substantially changed the language of the original text, adding block quotes from philosophers and novelists to underline its rhetoric. A third version of the article appeared as part of a complete English translation of Tiqqun 1, done by the anonymous translator Tiqqunista. This third version was effectively a subset of the revision, lacking language unique to the original and the block quotes introduced in the revision. With the exception of Theory of Bloom and Theory of the Young-Girl (see below note), all of Tiqqun's articles have been given an English rendering based on their original French versions. Theory of Bloom and Theory of the Young-Girl, however, were each first revised in French, and the English translations of each were based on their respective revisions. The original instances of both articles first appearing in Tiqqun 1 remain unavailable in English.) describes a phenomenon in which people become alienated from each other as a consequence of living in capitalist society. Although the term "Bloom" is used contextually throughout the issue to refer to an alienated modern subject, the authors explicitly deny this characterization as reductive, instead describing Bloom as a Stimmung, or a certain "mood" of personality. According to the authors, a Bloom is "foreign to himself" in the sense that capitalist society denies him the ability to be his authentic self. Bloom is thus a kind of "mask", recalling the issue's frontispiece. Modern society therefore encourages superficial identification with various predicate labels (being a woman, being gay, being British, etc.), which the authors refer to as "poor substantiality", in an effort to prevent the socially harmful consequences of an isolated population. Since a Bloom is alienated from the modern society held in contempt by the authors, they consider that his rejection of that society can lead to violence, expressed in the murders committed by Mitchell Johnson and Kipland Kinkel, among others. (Note: The original version of Theory of Bloom was published in February 1999, shortly before the Columbine High School massacre. The original article described school shootings and other types of murder as symptoms of modern alienation, corresponding to the Bloom figure described by the authors. When the article was revised, it was updated to mention the Columbine shootings as a further example.) Phenomenology of Everyday Life is a brief piece in which the narrator describes an "absurd" interaction with a bakery clerk, where each is expected to play the economic roles of customer and vendor. (Note: The piece has been interpreted as a failed flirtation between the narrator and the clerk.)

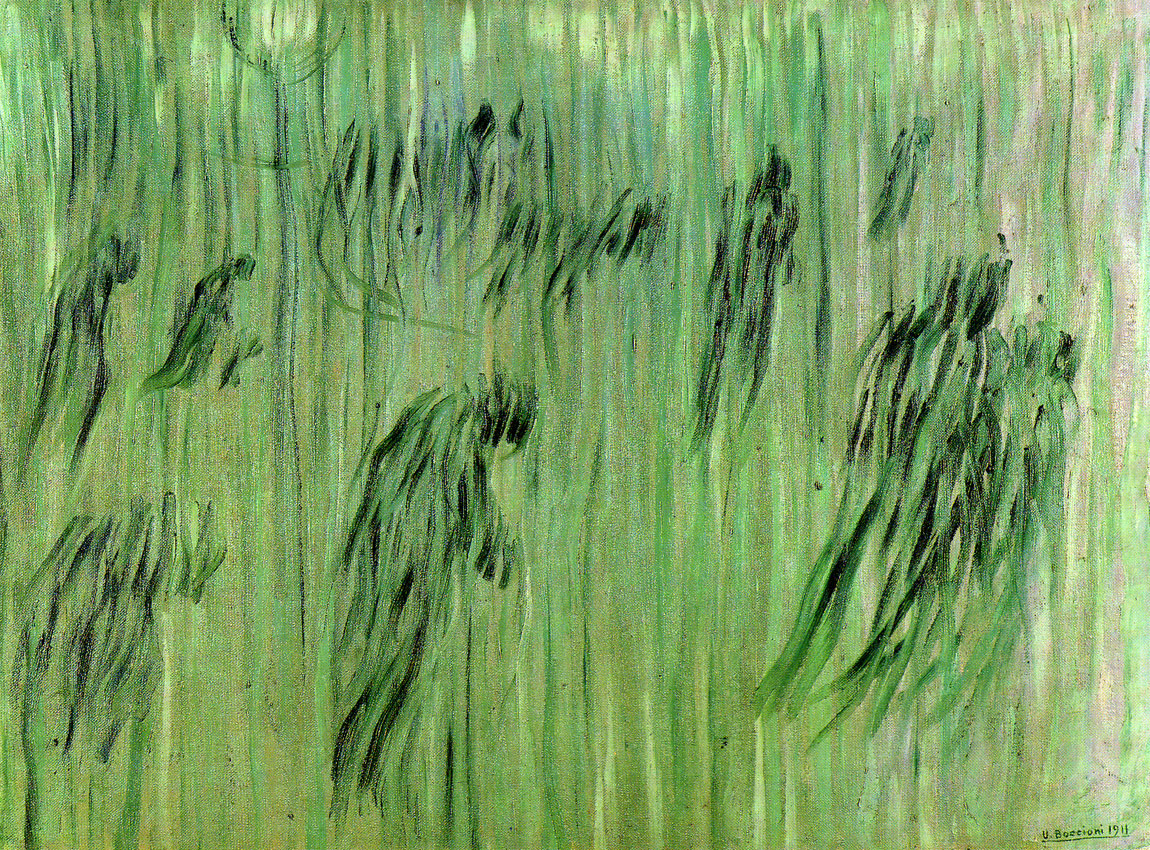
The journal's first issue used an artwork by Umberto Boccioni (Quelli che Restano/Those Who Remain) to illustrate an article describing the Imaginary Party

Theses on the Imaginary Party describes its title's subject as a portion of humanity who come to reject modern society. Spectacle and biopower are presented as two reinforcing aspects of modernity: the former is a control mechanism which ensures compliance with and reproduction of the society's norms, while the latter presents itself as a benevolent force providing for the needs of the population. Against these, "agents" of the Imaginary Party commit acts which are pathologized by the society as antisocial and irrational, including rioting and mass shootings. According to the authors, Blooms are prone to become members of the Imaginary Party because of their alienation from modern society. Johann Georg Elser, failed assassin of Adolf Hitler, is described by the authors as a "model Bloom", due to his modest life. Silence and Beyond is a piece which describes the threatening power of silence when wielded by a group of rioters. The article describes the 1998 suicide of Edoardo Massari, an Italian anarchist who was jailed in Turin on suspicion of eco-terrorism against construction sites for the Italian TGV high-speed train. In response, anarchist rioters silently marched through Turin over the next several days, brandishing weapons, damaging property, and assaulting journalists. The authors praised the rioters' tactics because by refusing to make demands or to communicate in conventional ways, the rioters frustrated commentators who insisted on dialogue, instead expressing their opposition to existing society using violent direct action. On the Economy Considered as Black Magic is a criticism of modern economics. The authors reject the economic property of fungibility as dehumanizing, since it leads to the fungibility of human beings themselves; Blooms are "absolutely equivalent" with each other (as potential employees, members of society, etc.) and therefore adopt superficial traits in an effort to present individual personalities. The authors also reject what they describe as the ahistorical retconning of modern economic theory onto all human history. As a counterexample, they cite the gift economy of the Kula ring in Papua New Guinea, as described in Bronisław Malinowski's Argonauts of the Western Pacific.

Preliminary Materials For a Theory of the Young-Girl (Note: There are two versions of Theory of the Young-Girl. The original version of the article appearing in Tiqqun 1 was later revised (Note: "[The passages and quotations comprising Theory of the Young-Girl] are assembled here under approximate rubrics, just as they were published in TIQQUN 1; there was no doubt they needed a little organization.") for republication as a stand-alone volume. The revised version was translated into English by Ariana Reines; although it treated most of the same ideas, the revision permuted several passages and substantially changed the language of the original text. With the exception of Theory of the Young-Girl and Theory of Bloom (see above note), all of Tiqqun's articles have been given an English rendering based on their original French versions. Theory of the Young-Girl and Theory of Bloom, however, were each first revised in French, and the English translations of each were based on their respective revisions. The original instances of both articles first appearing in Tiqqun 1 remain unavailable in English.) describes "the Young-Girl" as a social archetype related to young women's femininity in modern capitalist society. The article consists of a series of glosses, including declarative statements on the characteristics of the Young-Girl and phrases taken from women's magazines. The archetype is complementary to Bloom: whereas Bloom is an alienated subject who threatens to harm capitalist society, the Young-Girl fully participates in, is a commodity of, and defends that society. Although the article focuses on traits and language associated with femininity, it also stresses that men can function as Young-Girls in society by participating in and upholding it, while also taking care to uphold their public image out of vanity. A quotation attributed to Silvio Berlusconi describes him as a male Young-Girl: "They've wounded me in what is most dear to me: my image." Building on these themes, Machine-Men: User's Guide is a feminist piece which discusses prescription drugs—especially Viagra—as a form of biopolitical technology. The Critical Metaphysicians beneath the "Unemployed Persons' movement" is a brief article describing an "unemployed workers'" movement in France during 1997 and 1998, including reproductions of related protest flyers. A Few Scandalous Actions of the Imaginary Party is a series of vignettes recounting situations instigated by the authors and their associates; the piece ends with a satirical mockery of the novelist Michel Houellebecq, an object of scorn for the authors.

=== Tiqqun 2 ===
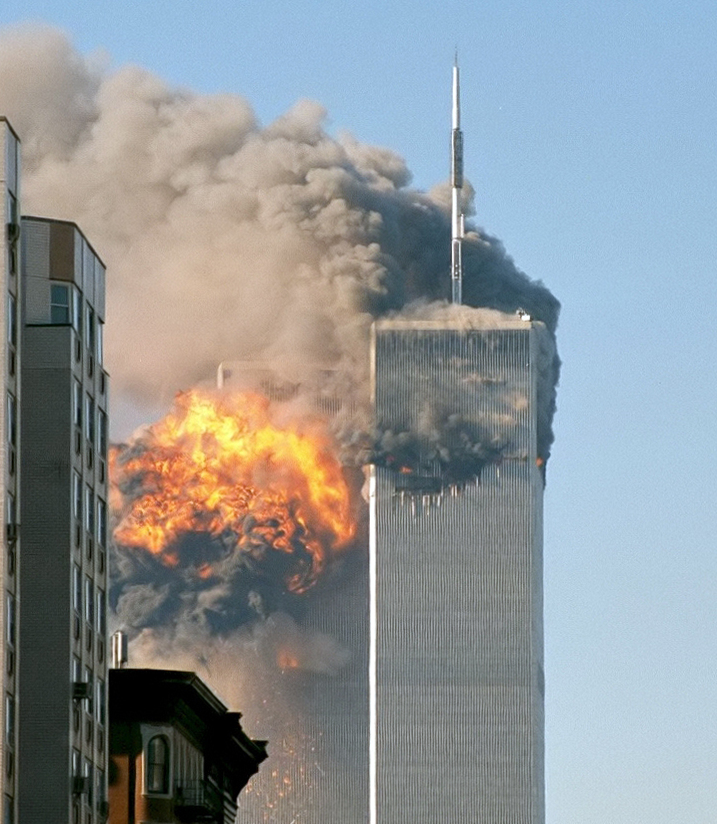
The journal's second issue reproduced a photograph of the September 11 attacks (similar to that shown) to illustrate an article about civil war; the second issue was published just after the attacks

Introduction to Civil War expands the concept of civil war to become a philosophical category explaining human interactions. According to the authors, individuals have various inclinations, which are forms of life. Because humans have differing inclinations and share the same world, they exist in a state of civil war with each other—their conflicts are not those of states in conventional warfare, and although not necessary, the possibility of violence is never excluded. States and modern society developed as mechanisms which sought to neutralize the natural state of civil war; against this, the authors propose natural civil war as the preferable state for humanity, which they liken to Tiqqun. The Cybernetic Hypothesis describes the rise of cybernetics in the years following World War II, a modern paradigm of control mechanisms which supplanted the "liberal hypothesis". The liberal hypothesis refers to the dominance of liberalism—and the ideal of rational self-interest—from the early 19th through the early 20th centuries, until societal control was sought for its own sake. Cybernetics was developed with military applications: Norbert Wiener developed an automated, predictive anti-aircraft system, and the need to develop a decentered communication system in the event of nuclear war gave rise to the internet. Since cybernetic systems seek control and equilibrium, the authors advocate their defeat by creating unmanagable situations. The article was illustrated by various images depicting technology, including works by H.R. Giger suggesting its disturbing aspects. (Note: Four of Giger's works were used to illustrate the article, of which one appeared on an early page. A second page reproduced a detail of Landscape XX, depicting genitalia. A third page reproduced a detail of Landscape XIX, depicting a skull surrounded by machinery; the piece is similar to (but distinct from) an album cover that Giger made for Brain Salad Surgery, an album by the band Emerson, Lake and Palmer. Biomechanoid, a sculpture, was reproduced on a fourth page.) (Note: The article's illustrations also included a photograph of a quarter-dome curved mirror or surveillance camera, set in the corner of a hallway ceiling in the New York subway system. The photograph—sub_nyc01—taken by M. T. Litschauer, was part of a series on featureless interiors of subway systems, which she referred to as "non-sites". Tiqqun used the phrases "non-site", "non-place" and similar terms to refer to urban environments that are meant only to be passed through, and not inhabited. The photograph was also reproduced in a volume of the Project on the City, a book series on urban planning which the authors cited in another article.) Theses on the Terrible Community describes pathological communities which arise in modern society. Although such communities may include countercultures, they can also include mainstream communities, such as modern corporations. Terrible communities seek to preserve themselves at the cost of the inability of their members to speak honestly with each other, referred to in the article as parrhesia. The authors seek to replace terrible communities with authentic communities whose members can be honest with each other.

Alfred Kubin's Selbsbetrachtung/Self-Observation was used to illustrate The Problem of the Head

The Problem of the Head is a criticism of avant-garde groups in revolutionary politics and the arts, which present themselves as the "heads" of their corresponding movements. "The Problem of the Head" also refers to the questions of societal leadership (a king, a president, a business, etc.), and the form of leadership in a society (monarchy, democracy, oligarchy, etc.). The authors claim that the liberal hypothesis was a previous answer to the problem, eventually replaced by the cybernetic hypothesis. The period from 1914 to 1945 was a time of instability, and this is what allowed avant-garde movements—such as Surrealism and Bolshevism—to flourish. However, avant-garde movements tend to become preoccupied with their own culture and internal issues, to the detriment of the broader issues that they claim to represent, and are therefore likened to terrible communities. A note indicates that in June 2000, the piece was read aloud at a retrospective exhibit of modern art in Venice, upsetting two of the participating artists. "A critical metaphysics could emerge as a science of apparatuses..." is presented as the founding text of the SACS, the Society for the Advancement of Criminal Science. The authors describe modern society as a series of control mechanisms, or apparatuses; examples include highways, store security, and turnstiles. (Note: The piece began with a preface describing modern office buildings and office equipment (chairs, computers, etc) as other types of control apparatuses. For illustration, the preface was accompanied by an art photograph by William Clift, showing the reflection of the Old St. Louis Courthouse in the glass of the Equitable building, a modern office building.) For the authors, the "science of apparatuses" is thus simply the science of crime, techniques for circumventing and defeating control apparatuses. The authors therefore promote the collection and dissemination of criminal techniques intended to undermine capitalist society. (Note: Examples are found on a page of "recipe instructions" which was not reproduced in the article's official English translation. The page claims to give instructions for the manufacture of a specific type of Molotov cocktail, manufacture of caltrops intended for anti-police use, and welfare fraud.) Report to the S.A.C.S. Concerning an Imperial Apparatus is a critical account of Bluewater, a shopping mall outside London, newly completed at the time of writing. The authors compare the modern shopping mall to 19th-century historical precursors, including the French arcades and The Crystal Palace. They also describe shopping malls using terms taken from the Project on the City, a book series on urban planning just mentioned by name—and derided—in the previous article. The article describes the 1956 opening of the Southdale Center—the world's first enclosed, air-conditioned shopping mall—air conditioning itself, and artificial plants, referred to as "Replascape". Articles on all three topics appear in the volumes Mutations and Harvard Design School Guide to Shopping.

The Little Game of the Man of the Old Regime is a critique of a conservative social archetype, described as an older person who withdraws from society while criticizing it, presenting themselves as above or outside social conflict. The authors describe the Man of the Old Regime as a specific type of Bloom whose critique of society is impotent; they also attribute several negative traits to the archetype, including false consciousness. In the original issue the article was followed by You're Never Too Old to Ditch Out, a small piece which encouraged older people to withdraw from mainstream society and instead seek authentic community with others, as opposed to isolation. Sonogram of a Potential is a feminist article treating sonograms, abortion, and women's history during the Italian Years of Lead in the 1970s. The authors use the Herman Melville short story "Bartleby, the Scrivener" and its protagonist's phrase "I would prefer not to" as devices to explore the concepts of general strike and sex strikes. (Note: The article's illustrations included Leda, an art photograph by Joel-Peter Witkin depicting the Greek myth of Leda and the swan. The illustration appeared next to language dealing with norms in human sexuality. Witkin is known for working with disabled subjects; the central model portraying Leda was Goddess Bunny, a disabled drag queen.) This Is Not a Program describes the Years of Lead in detail, contrasting the Italian "Creeping May" of 1977 with the French protests of May 1968. During the period of civil unrest, several left wing factions competed with each other and with the Italian state. The established Left consisted of the Italian Communist Party (PCI), labor unions and worker's movements, while a more radical faction—the Autonomists—rejected organizational hierarchy and work itself. In the context of anarchist movements, the authors describe the Imaginary Party as a "plane of consistency" where individuals who seek to subvert modern society can find each other and form alliances. How Is It to Be Done? is a brief lyrical piece summarizing the issue's themes, its title a play on Lenin's work What Is to Be Done?. Referring to the issue's subtitle, the authors seek to inhabit "zones of offensive opacity"—akin to no-go zones—as points from which to begin an assault on modern capitalist society. In order to maintain opacity, the authors encourage the rejection of predicate labels associated with identity politics because authorities might use them to more easily identify individuals. The piece ends with a call to insurrection.

==== Minor pieces ====
Nine minor pieces appeared in Tiqqun 2, which included reproductions of flyers posted publicly, or for dissemination at demonstrations.

Final Warning to the Imaginary Party is a sarcastic list of articles concerning the proper use of public space—for leisure and consumption as opposed to protest or "abnormal behavior"—written from the point of view of governments and businesses. The piece was reproduced as photographs of the printed list, posted in public and subsequently defaced and marked with criticisms. The Conquerors had Conquered Without Trouble is a prose vignette describing gatherings of silent, masked people in the world's cities, to the disturbance of the cities' original "conquerors". The old conquerors blamed the phenomenon on an "Invisible Committee", and the piece invoked the phrase used as an author's credit in the later eponymous texts:

A great menace, at the same time as a great derision, were given off by the crowds of mute masks with their regard riveted on the entrenched conquerors. These conquerors were certainly not mistaken as they hastily denounced the conspiracy of a certain Invisible Committee. They even spoke of a major peril for civilization, for democracy, for order and the economy. But in the interiors of their chateaux, the conquerors became afraid.

The Untitled Notes on Citizenship Papers are remarks on a social movement demanding citizen documentation for all persons; the authors observed that such a movement could be tactically useful to abolish the concept of citizenship as such, in the sense that granting citizenship documentation to all persons would defeat the exclusive character of citizenship itself. Progress doesn't want Those that don't want Progress is another sarcastic flyer, admonishing the residents of the Paris suburb Montreuil to accept gentrification and the re-election of mayor Jean-Pierre Brard, or else leave. Stop DomestiCAFion! is a flyer concerning the demeaning aspects of applying for welfare, describing inspections made by social workers with regard to income and social life as intrusive. This was immediately followed by a quotation from Robert Walser describing a flame igniting on a stage during a performance, which the audience initially believed to be part of the show, but which then frightened the performers and finally the audience once they understood the fire to be a real danger.

Notes on the Local is a series of remarks on the fragmentation of the built environment into spaces with distinct functions. According to the authors, places like highways, supermarkets and public benches are transient locations that their users are expected to pass through in a timely fashion. To cope with this regimented use of real space, virtual spaces (television, internet, video games) are provided to people to give an illusion of freedom. You're Never Too Old to Ditch Out is a piece which exhorted the elderly to deny capitalist society their further participation in it, instead using their savings for self-reliance and to seek authentic community with others. Hello! is a piece which criticized the activist group ATTAC for what the authors described as its recuperation into conventional capitalist society. Ma noi ci saremo (But We'll Be Here) is a series of remarks on the then-recent anti-globalization protests which occurred in Genoa, Prague, and Seattle.

=== Related texts ===
Other texts not appearing in the original journal have been associated with Tiqqun and the Invisible Committee. The Great Game of Civil War is a brief piece describing the difficulty of leaving modern society, using sarcastic language similar to that found in Tiqqun's flyers and a ten-point format similar to Final Warning to the Imaginary Party. In 2004, the postscript to an Italian edition of Theory of Bloom announced the forthcoming publication of Call (Appel), an anonymous tract which proposed secession from mainstream capitalist society. Call used vocabulary and rhetoric common to both Tiqqun and the Invisible Committee (e.g. Spectacle and biopower, an imperative to form communes). Call was later criticized on the Left for its suggestion that actors can unilaterally withdraw from capitalist society on their own terms. According to the critic, capitalism continues to inform relations of production throughout society, a situation from which potential defectors cannot immediately escape.

== Reception ==
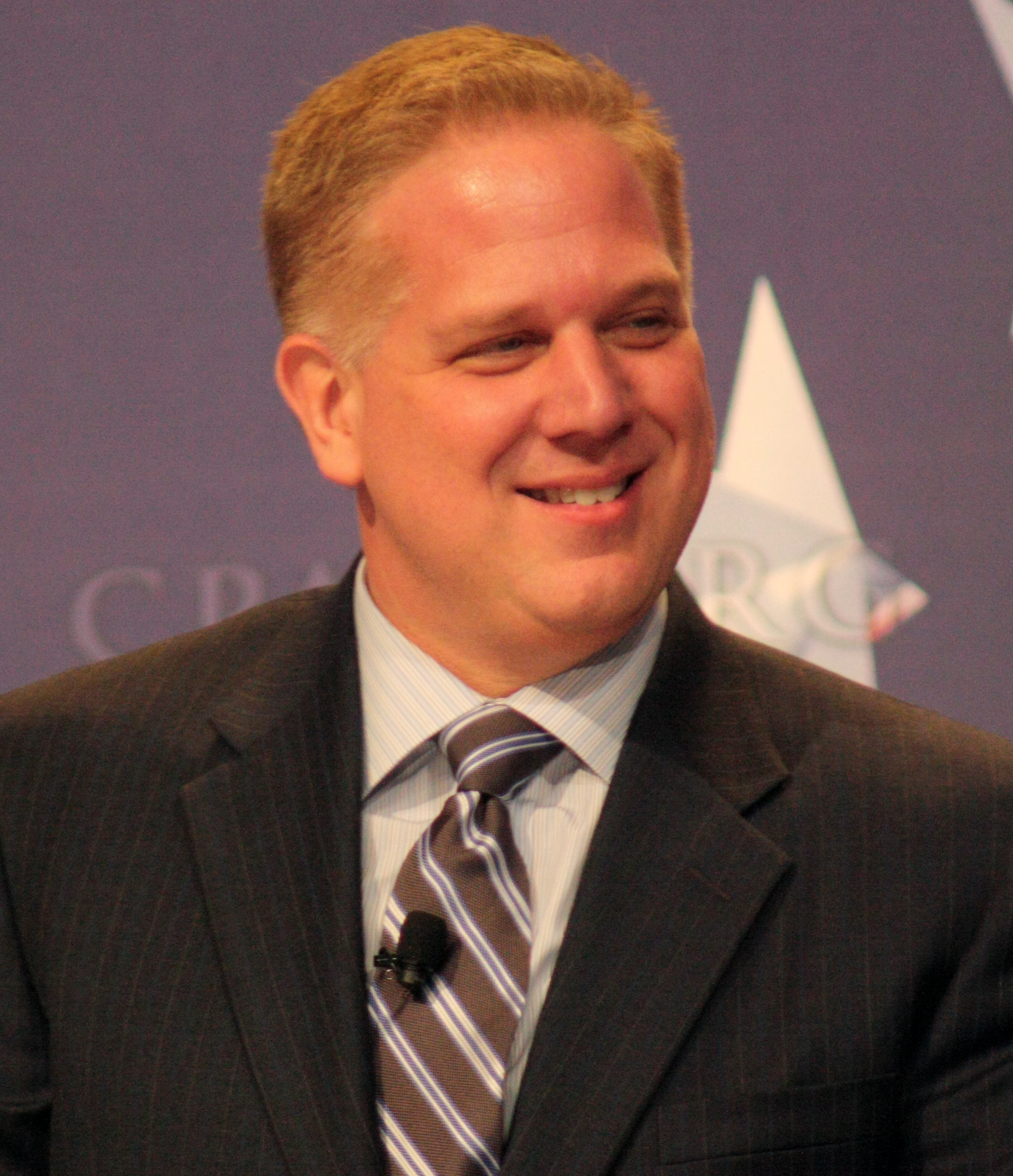
Glenn Beck denounced The Coming Insurrection, which led to increased interest in Tiqqun

Tiqqun came to wider attention in the English-speaking world through its association with the Invisible Committee, whose book The Coming Insurrection was denounced (and thereby popularized) by the American conservative commentator Glenn Beck following the Tarnac Nine arrests. Due to its popularization following the arrests, the journal's articles have received attention in humanities scholarship and anarchist reading circles, generating a body of critical literature. Some authors have analyzed the articles' historical background, while others have used them to underline points in original research. Criticisms range from perceived misogyny (in the Young-Girl article) to the commercial success of The Coming Insurrection itself.

Jason E. Smith detailed the history of civil unrest in 1970s Italy, providing historical background for Tiqqun's subject matter in This is Not a Program. He underlined the division within the Italian Left between established, labor-focused organizations (including the Italian Communist Party and worker's unions) and more radical, autonomist groups who refused the employment relation altogether, using autoreduction as a coercive tactic to appropriate goods and services at lower prices, including the looting of supermarkets. Smith argued that Tiqqun's articles advocate a politics of incivility, informed by the latter autonomist tendency in the Italian Left. Alexander R. Galloway cited The Cybernetic Hypothesis in an essay treating the conceptual history of the black box, likening black bloc demonstrators to "a black box" in the sense that each has internal dynamics opaque to outisiders. (Note: Galloway and Smith were co-translators of the English edition of Introduction to Civil War.) Andrew Culp discussed Michel Foucault's studies on war, politics and insurrection as precursors of Tiqqun's martial discourse; he also described the Invisible Committee as a group which splintered from the personnel involved with creating the journal.

In two related articles, Jackie Wang cited The Cybernetic Hypothesis to describe policing as a form of social control. One piece detailed the real example of PredPol, predictive policing software adopted by several American police departments throughout the 2010s; the second was a personal reflection on the fictional example of RoboCop as a cybernetic cop. In response to the emergence of the COVID-19 pandemic and the practice of wearing face masks intended to slow the spread of the disease, Philippe Theophanidis essayed the cultural significance of masks, using Portrait Cover with Grotesques as a device to explore the topic. He noted the painting's invocation in Tiqqun, and also noted with irony that although face coverings had recently been banned in France due to their use by demonstrators and Muslim women as part of niqab, the French government later mandated face coverings in response to the pandemic.

Reg Johanson decried an ableist tendency which he observed in both Tiqqun and the Invisible Committee. According to Johanson, both collectives are suspicious of people suffering from serious illness or disabilities because their status renders them dependent on—and necessarily complicit with—the society sustaining their lives, which the authors seek to subvert. He also noted that the collective placed a premium on mobility, suggesting the members' possible youth, wealth, or lack of family life.

Preliminary Materials For a Theory of the Young-Girl consists of a series of passages characterizing "the Young-Girl", frequently in sexist terms. Representative examples include "The Young-Girl is a lie, the apogee of which is her face." and "The Young-Girl's ass is a global village." Critics of the text agree that its ostensible purpose is not to insult women, but rather to denounce a capitalist process of socialization which produces "the Young-Girl" as a pathological archetype which is harmful to real women. While acknowledging this premise, Moira Weigel and Mal Ahern criticized the text as misogynistic, suggesting that its anonymity and irony were used as covers to pre-emptively deflect accusations of sexism; Weigel and Ahern's article was itself criticized in later articles. Catherine Driscoll noted that the device of the "Young-Girl" does not suggest the authors' dissatisfaction with society from a woman's point of view, but was instead chosen as one subordinate facet of a larger political philosophical project. Translator Ariana Reines noted that although she later came to appreciate the text, the process of reading and translating it made her sick—not in the metaphorical sense of finding the rhetoric disagreeable, but in the literal sense that she experienced nausea and migraines while preparing her translation.

Tiqqun has also been criticized in anarchist reading circles, frequently in connection with the Invisible Committee. One article traced the journal's philosophical influences, focusing on Heidegger, nihilism and the Jewish messianic figures of Sabbatai Zevi and Jacob Frank, ultimately rejecting the journal itself as philosophically insignificant. Another article criticized This is Not a Program, claiming that the latter gave a revisonist account of the Years of Lead. Others instead focused on works by the Invisible Committee (though mentioning Tiqqun in passing), arguing that the former group marketed its books as fashionable consumer products following the Tarnac Nine arrests, contrary to their purported anti-capitalist views. Common to all these articles is the observation that the texts under examination—whether by Tiqqun or the Invisible Committee—have a tendency to contradict themselves; the criticisms also use polemical language comparable to that used in Tiqqun itself.

A pair of critical works discussed Tiqqun and the Invisible Committee in more sympathetic terms. Pedro José Mariblanca Corrales treated Tiqqun's concept of Bloom by way of the journal's vocabulary (see the below glossary), elaborating the latter to explain the social causes giving rise to the former. Alden Wood wrote a series of academic articles collected in a single volume, exploring aspects of the two group's writings by reading them together with others. Wood compared the groups' use of musical metaphor with the atonal compositions of Arnold Schoenberg, their invocations of nihilism with George Bataille, and detailed the influence of Heidegger on Tiqqun's project, noted by others. (Note: The chapter involving Bataille also appeared as a stand-alone journal article, and there are slight differences between both versions of the text.)

== Bibliography ==
=== Original French sources ===
- Tiqqun (1999). Tiqqun, Organe conscient du Parti Imaginaire: Exercices de Métaphysique Critique – via archive.org. Original French edition of Tiqqun 1.
- Tiqqun (2001). Tiqqun, Organe de liaison au sein du Parti Imaginaire: Zone d'Opacité Offensive – via archive.org. Original French edition of Tiqqun 2.

=== English translations ===
- Tiqqun (2020). The Cybernetic Hypothesis. Semiotext(e) Intervention Series. Vol. 28. Translated by Hurley, Robert. Semiotext(e). ISBN 9781635900927. Translation of the article which originally appeared in Tiqqun 2.
- Tiqqun (2010). Introduction to Civil War. Semiotext(e) Intervention Series. Vol. 4. Translated by Galloway, Alexander R.; Smith, Jason E. Semiotext(e). ISBN 9781584350866. Translation of the titular article, and also of "How Is It to Be Done?", which both originally appeared in Tiqqun 2.
- Tiqqun (2012). Preliminary Materials For a Theory of the Young-Girl (PDF). Semiotext(e) Intervention Series. Vol. 12. Translated by Reines, Ariana. Semiotext(e). ISBN 9781584351085. Translation of a revised version of the article which originally appeared in Tiqqun 1.
- Tiqqun (2012). Theory of Bloom (PDF). Translated by Hurley, Robert. Little Black Cart. ISBN 9781620490020. Archived from the original (PDF) on 2021-07-14. Translation of the article which originally appeared in Tiqqun 1.
- Tiqqun (2011). This is Not a Program (PDF). Semiotext(e) Intervention Series. Vol. 7. Translated by Jordan, Joshua David. Semiotext(e). ISBN 9781584350972. Translation of the titular article, and also of "A critical metaphysics could emerge as a science of apparatuses...", which both originally appeared in Tiqqun 2.
- Tiqqun (October 2011). Tiqqun, Conscious Organ of the Imaginary Party: Exercises in Critical Metaphysics (PDF). Translated by Tiqqunista. Little Black Cart. Unofficial English translation of Tiqqun 1.
