= Tarnac Nine =

Group of 9 French activists accused of sabotage

The Tarnac Nine are a French group of nine alleged anarchist saboteurs: Mathieu Burnel, Julien Coupat, Bertrand Deveaux, Manon Glibert, Gabrielle Hallez, Elsa Hauck, Yildune Lévy, Benjamin Rosoux and Aria Thomas. (Note: "Bertrand Deveaux, 22, Elsa Hauck, 24, Aria Thomas, 27, Matthieu Burnel, 27, Gabrielle Hallez, 30, Manon Glibert, 25, Benjamin Rosoux, 30 and Yildune Lévy, 25 have all since regained their freedom, albeit under judicial supervision. Only Julien Coupat, 34, considered the leader, remains incarcerated." —Translated from the French at Le Monde, 25 March 2009.) They were arrested on 11 November 2008 in an operation carried out by French police throughout Paris, Rouen and particularly Tarnac, rural France. The operation resulted in twenty arrests, of whom eleven were released almost immediately afterward. The remaining nine who were held for questioning, and who on 15 November were variously listed as suspects and accused of crimes, then became known as the Tarnac Nine. One year later, Glibert's husband Christophe Becker was also arrested in Tarnac in connection with the matter; as a result, the group is also sometimes known as the Tarnac Ten.

The group were "accused of 'criminal association for the purposes of terrorist activity' on the grounds that they were to have participated in the sabotage of overhead electrical lines on France's national railways." (Note: See the very beginning of the .pdf for this quote, or else see p. 5 of the print version. The quote derives from a brief foreword which was added to the English edition of The Coming Insurrection. The Coming Insurrection is a 2007 French political tract (translated into English in 2009) which has been associated with the Tarnac Nine case.) In late October and early November 2008, horseshoe-shaped iron bars were used to obstruct power cables of the TGV railways at locations throughout France, resulting in delays for about 160 trains. (Note: "The youths were accused of having participated in a number of sabotage attacks against high-speed TGV train routes, involving the obstruction of the trains’ power cables with horseshoe-shaped iron bars, causing a series of delays affecting some 160 trains." (p. 2.)) In particular, one instance of this occurred on 7–8 November 2008, in Dhuisy, Seine-et-Marne, near Paris. (Note: "Judge (Duyé): For his part, Julien Coupat declared in an explicit way when he responded to the questions of the examining magistrate that he wasn’t only at Seine-en-Marne during the night of 7 to 8 November 2008, but also that he was in your company. Response (Lévy): Yes, yes, I was indeed with him." (pp. 1–2.)) On the same night, Coupat and his partner Lévy were driving in the area, under police surveillance. Three days later, the arrests were made. On 12 April 2018, following a long and complex legal case, the group were acquitted of the most serious charges brought against them, including sabotage and conspiracy, with some members being convicted on lesser charges.

== Background and Tarnac ==
The original group of nine consists of five women and four men, aged from 22 through 34 at the time of the arrests, who are generally well-educated. Coupat was a former graduate student and is a political writer, having contributed to a philosophical journal called Tiqqun. Coupat's partner, Lévy, is an archaeologist. Others have been described as "a Swiss sitcom actor (Thomas), a distinguished clarinettist (Glibert), a student nurse (Hallez, an ex-partner of Coupat's) and Benjamin Rosoux, a University of Edinburgh graduate who runs the (Tarnac's) grocer's shop and its adjoining bar-restaurant." At the time of the arrests, Deveaux and Hauck were also described as beginning graduate students in sociology and English, respectively.

The nine were part of a larger group of like-minded, left-wing young people who sought to relocate to a rural area in order to live simply and communally, shunning consumerism. Consequently, they scouted locations and settled on Tarnac, both for its rural setting and also for the similar political orientation of the local residents: in Limousin, Tarnac is part of an area of France which has a long history with communism and the French Resistance of World War II, having successfully avoided German occupation. (Note: "In Tarnac (a village proud of its role in the Resistance, and represented by a communist mayor for four decades) a committee of support was set up, conveying a virtually unanimous show of solidarity of the villagers with those arrested." (p. 2.)) Upon moving in, the group began operating a disused shop and bar, and began community initiatives such as a film club and food delivery services for elderly locals. The newcomers were generally well-liked by their neighbors. (Note: "Across the hill from the farm where Coupat was arrested, Thierry Letellier, the independent mayor of the neighbouring village, tended his sheep farm. He said: "They were my neighbours, helping me on the farm and selling my meat at the shop. They were kind, intelligent and spoke several languages. They were politicised, on the left and clearly anti-capitalist like lots of people here, but they were people active in community life who wanted to change society at a local level first.") On the other hand, authorities have rejected this positive image of the group, instead describing them as an anarchist terrorist cell who sought a rural location as a base of operations and who shunned cell phones in order to avoid detection by authorities. (Note: "That many of the Tarnac group didn’t use cell phones only aroused police suspicion further, a fact the French government later menacingly ascribed to their need to avoid detection.")

== Legal case ==
From the time of the arrests until 2018, the group had been involved in complex legal proceedings in which the members faced various criminal charges related to terrorism, sabotage, conspiracy, and refusal to submit to biological sampling. (Note: "If they are fascinated with us, we are not fascinated with them – whom our children, not without humor, now call the "thieves of toothbrushes," because every time they aim their 9mm guns at us, they swipe all the toothbrushes for their precious DNA experts.") Four of the nine were released shortly after the arrests; Glibert, Hallez and Rosoux were later released on 2 December 2008, and Lévy was released on 16 January 2009. Coupat, who was presumed by the prosecution to be the group's leader, was released on 28 May 2009. In late November 2009, a further arrest was made: Christophe Becker, husband of Glibert, was arrested in Tarnac on related suspicions, and released shortly thereafter. (Note: "In the dawn hours of November 27, 2009, the French antiterror police descended into Tarnac once again to arrest a new suspect for the case, a man in his 30s named Christophe, whom the police believed to be close with the Tarnac Nine. Enraged by the arrest, the Tarnac Nine went on the offensive and wrote an acerbic letter to their judges that was published in Le Monde on December 3, titled Why We Will No Longer Respect the Judicial Restraints Placed Upon Us.") (Note: "Jérémie Assous is one of the defense lawyers for the Tarnac Nine. Manon Glibert, one of those indicted in the case, asked Assous to ensure the defense of Christophe Becker, her husband, arrested this morning in Tarnac. Becker will not be able to see his lawyer until the end of a 72-hour custody." —Translated from the French at La Montagne, 24 November 2009.) (Note: French news media report an initial date for Becker's custody of 24 November (2009), while Vice and Not Bored! report an "arrest" date of 27 November. The three-day interval appears to reflect French booking procedures per La Montagne, with the true initial date of physical detention (if not legal arrest) being 24 November.) In response, and in defiance of the judicial supervision with which they were ordered to comply, the nine met and jointly wrote a letter, published in Le Monde in early December: Why we will no longer respect the judicial restraints placed upon us. (Note: Vice reports a publication date of 3 December (2009), while Not Bored! gives 4 December.) The group's judicial supervision orders were lifted on 18 December 2009, and due to the new arrest, the group are sometimes instead described as the Tarnac Ten.

The prosecution's case was based upon police surveillance of the group, particularly the above proximity of Coupat and Lévy to a site where sabotage occurred. Further, the group generally (and Coupat specifically) were suspected of being possible members of the Invisible Committee, an anonymous author (or authors) who wrote The Coming Insurrection, an anti-capitalist, anarchist tract originally published in 2007 which admonishes its readers to form communes and disrupt infrastructure, reminiscent of the politics and activities which the group were actually engaged in, and also of the specific crimes with which they were accused. (Note: "French police say Coupat was the author of an anonymous tract against capitalism and modern society, The Coming Insurrection.") In particular, according to the prosecution, one passage of the book seems to directly anticipate the rail sabotage:

Information and energy circulate via wire networks, fibers and channels, and these can be attacked. Nowadays sabotaging the social machine with any real effect involves reappropriating and reinventing the ways of interrupting its networks. How can a TGV line or an electrical network be rendered useless? How does one find the weak points in computer networks, or scramble radio waves and fill screens with white noise?

— The Invisible Committee, The Coming Insurrection, p. 112.

Over time, the prosecution's case weakened. As the case progressed, it was asserted that the method of sabotage employed could not have caused injuries, but merely disruption. (Note: "An SNCF maintenance technician stated that the malicious device 'could not in any way have caused an accident resulting in bodily harm'." —Translated from the French at Le Monde, 25 March 2009.) (Note: "The sabotage was done with the purpose of stopping the trains and couldn’t have resulted in any injuries or derailments.") Thierry Fragnoli, a magistrate originally assigned to the case, recused himself in April 2012. (Note: "Thierry Fragnoli, whose lack of impartiality forced him to recuse himself from the case in 2012 after an article was published in Le Canard enchaîné." (footnote, p. 6.)) In addition to being released from jail and having their judicial supervision lifted (despite the seriousness of the accusations), on 7 August 2015, magistrate Jeanne Duyé ordered that the specifically terrorist related charges against the group be dropped, a judgment which was upheld by the French supreme court. On 12 April 2018, the group were acquitted of the most serious remaining charges brought against them, particularly sabotage and conspiracy, while certain members were convicted on lesser charges with minimal or no sentences.

In particular Coupat and Lévy were convicted of refusing to consent to a DNA test, but weren't given a sentence, and another defendant was convicted of handling stolen goods and attempting to falsify documents.

In response to the publicity of the arrests, several philosophers came to the support of the nine, including Giorgio Agamben, Alberto Toscano, Alain Badiou, and Slavoj Žižek. (Note: "Giorgio Agamben and Luc Boltanski wrote editorials decrying the disproportion and hysteria of this repressive operation. A petition was circulated by Eric Hazan, publisher and friend of Coupat, and signed by Badiou, Bensaïd, Butler, Rancière, Žižek and several others." (p. 2.)) Further, several international "support committees", on behalf of the nine, "have sprung up across France and in the US, Spain, and Greece".

== See also ==
- Appellistes
- The Coming Insurrection
- Julien Coupat
- The Invisible Committee
- Tiqqun
