= The Anarchist Library =

Online archive of anarchist texts

- Formation: 2007
- Founder: Aragorn! Marco; Other anarchists
- Purpose: Archiving and distributing documentation related to anarchism
- Services: Digital library; file sharing
- Official language: English
- Affiliations: Anarchism
- Website: theanarchistlibrary.org

The Anarchist Library is an online anarchist library and archive founded around 2007 by Aragorn!, Marco and other anarchists. Free to use and aimed at gathering all English-language anarchist literature, or literature translated into English, the library gradually gained increasing importance within anarchism in the early 21st century.

== History ==
The online library was founded by Aragorn!, Marco and other anarchists around 2007. It emerged from anarchist circles that were then seeking to organize using the tools provided by the advent of the internet. Marco left it during the second half of the 2010s to establish another project, seeking a multiplicity of small anarchist libraries rather than a single one.

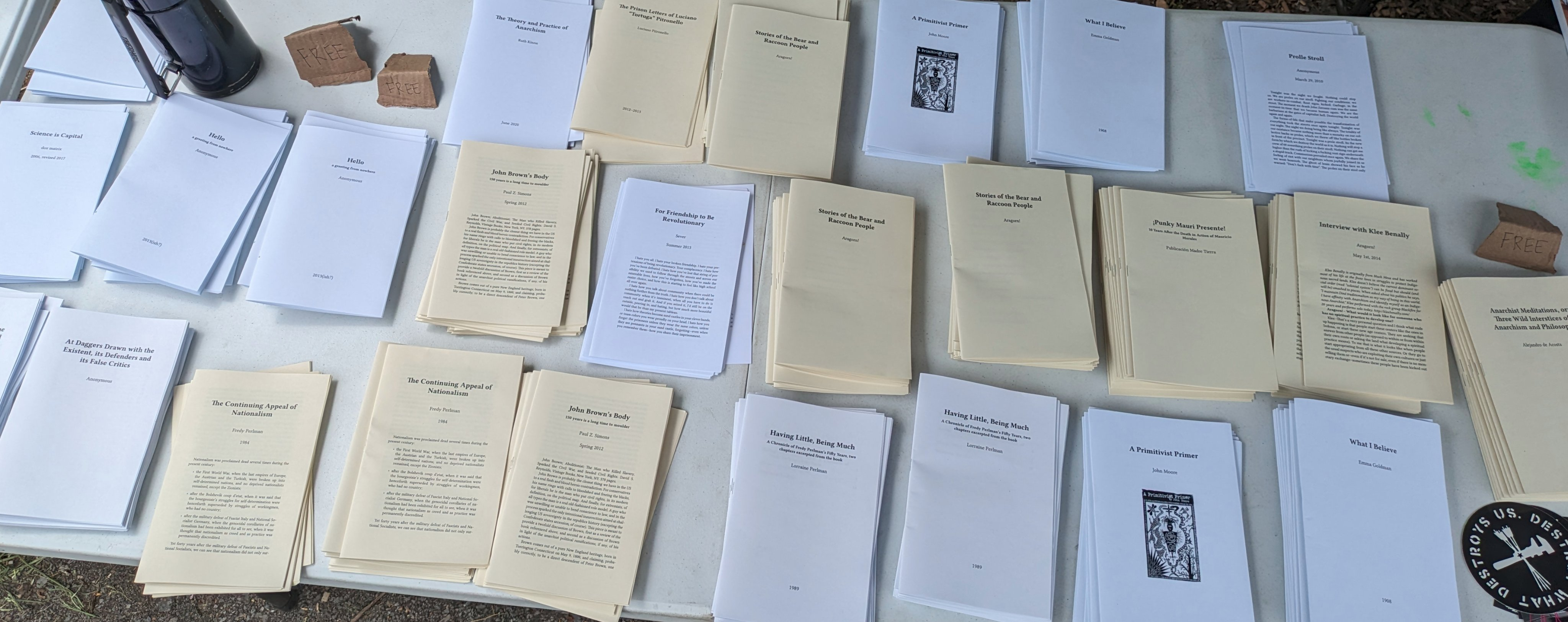
Table of The Anarchist Library for the 2024 Upstate Anarchist Bookfair in Binghamton, NY

In 2018, researcher Jayne Malenfant noted, in her surveys of anarchist youth in rural Canada, that the internet had become a privileged space for anarchist thought, particularly through this library. During the COVID-19 pandemic, the library undertook an effort to collect data related to mutual aid practices by anarchists.

== Goals and organization ==
It aims to serve as a gathering place for anarchist publications or those related to anarchism in English, and to enable the establishment of archival work for anarchist textual resources. The library's collections focus particularly on contemporary anarchism, and almost all of the texts are in English. The collection is built by free and open with regard to editors.

The library is credited by Ray Di Marco Campbell, lecturer at the University of Glasgow, with participating in anarchist economic practices. They argue that the availability of a number of research publications directly challenges the monopoly and private property of the publishing industry.

== Legacy ==
=== Influence(s) ===
The library is one of the older anarchist projects on the internet, and its approach to categorizing and preserving anarchist or anarchism-related sources can be seen, for example, in initiatives aimed at digitizing the American anarchist press. In 2019, Ruth Kinna noted the library as a 'reference work' on contemporary anarchist thought.

Fairmont University recommends The Anarchist Library as a useful resource for studying anarchism. Its collection of texts related to the Spanish Civil War was noted by the anarchist newspaper Fifth Estate.

== Bibliography ==
- Kinna, Ruth (2012), The continuum companion to anarchism (PDF), Bloomsbury Academic, ISBN 978-1-4411-7212-9
