= Aragorn! =

Anarchist theorist and writer (1970–2020)

- Born: 1 January 1970; United States
- Died: 13 February 2020 (aged 50); San Francisco Bay Area, United States
- Other name: Aragorn Bang
- Citizenship: United States
- Occupations: Systems administrator, writer, publisher, editor
- Movement: Anarchism

Aragorn! (1970–2020), was an Odawa systems administrator, writer, and anarchist. Founder of The Anarchist Library, he helped establish a portion of the anarchist movement's computer networks at the beginning of the 21st century while writing, publishing, or editing numerous texts, some of which are noted as significant for contemporary anarchist thought. He is generally credited as one of the founders of the indigenous anarchism (or anarcho-indigenism) tendency.

Born into an Odawa family, Aragorn was given this name at birth. He joined the punk, vegan, and anarchist movements in his twenties and began writing for numerous anarchist and punk publications. Among the publications he contributed to were Oppression Song, After the Revolution, HeartattaCk, Maximum Rock'nroll, Inside Front, Anarchy: A Journal of Desire Armed, Attentat, and especially Green Anarchy. Some of his contributions to the latter were noted as indicative of the anarchist movement's reach into First Nations peoples and as landmark moments for the birth of the anarcho-indigenism tendency. In general, Aragorn! favored insurrectionist, queer, or anti-civ tendencies in his publications and projects.

He also founded a relatively large number of websites and digital initiatives starting in the 2000s, the most famous of which, The Anarchist Library, holds a prominent place in anarchist propaganda in the early 21st century, according to certain historians. Aragorn! died in 2020 in the San Francisco Bay Area.

== Biography ==
Aragorn! was born in 1970 in the United States. He was born and raised within the Odawa people and was given the name Aragorn at birth. Later, he adopted the pseudonym 'Aragorn!', choosing the exclamation point to signify 'Aragorn Bang'.

He began joining the punk, vegan, and anarchist movements in his twenties, participating in several fanzines on the U.S. West Coast. Aragorn! also helped organize Café Che in Berkeley and the Berkeley Anarchist Study Group, one of the oldest anarchist groups in the country. The fanzines he contributed to during this period included Oppression Song, After the Revolution, HeartattaCk, Maximum Rock'nroll and Inside Front.

At the beginning of the 2000s, he took a hiatus after leaving the punk movement following accusations regarding his sexual conduct, before relaunching several anarchist initiatives. These were manifold. Primarily, he wrote and engaged in editorial work for articles and texts through Green Anarchy (2000–2009), Anarchy: A Journal of Desire Armed, Attentat, and Black Seed (2014–present). In the first publication of this list, he sought to demonstrate the proximity between anarchism and the liberation struggles of the First Nations, of which he was a member. According to some historians, appellist networks were in contact with him during this period before he broke with them, 'considering that their sectarian nature was dangerous'.

He also founded the publishing house Little Black Cart and launched and maintained a number of digital initiatives, such as anarchyplanet.org, anokchan.org, Anarchy Bang Radio, The Brilliant Podcast, anarchistnews.org, Anarchy 101, The Anvil Review, and The Anarchist Library.

In 2011, he supported anarchist participation in Occupy Canada.

Aragorn! died on 13 February 2020 in the San Francisco Bay Area.

== Thought ==
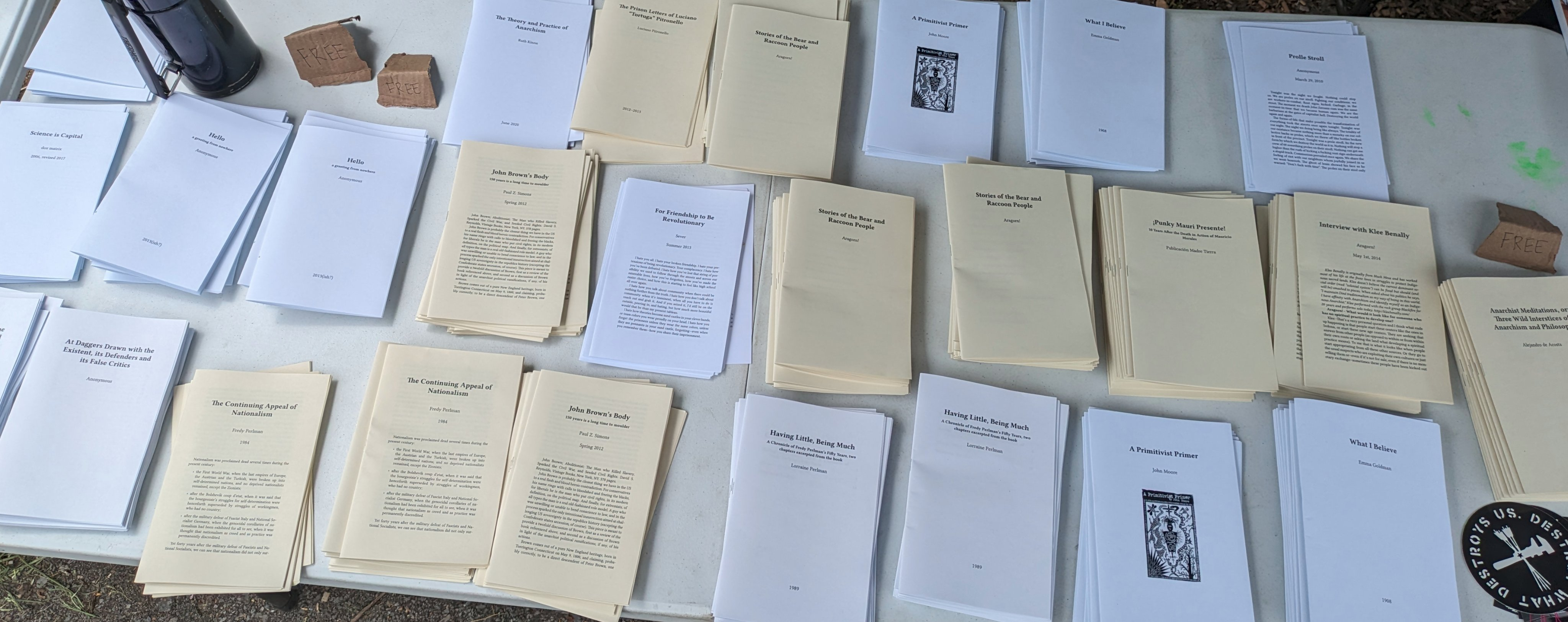
Table of The Anarchist Library for the 2024 Upstate Anarchist Bookfair in Binghamton, NY, comprising several of his works

Among the anarchist's political positions, one finds a commitment to the intersectionality of struggles, adopting clear stances in favor of the emergence and development of queer anarchism and eco-anarchism through anti-civ texts; however, he also leaned toward insurrectionary anarchism. He reportedly defended the use of propaganda by the deed as a means of conducting the anarchist struggle. The anarchist Bob Black described him as a representative of post-anarchism.

In 2017, in his philosophy thesis, Nicholas Montgomery considered that some of Aragorn!'s texts addressing the philosophical tension between technophilia and technophobia remained among the most 'sophisticated' writings on the subject to date.

Although critical of Eurocentric anarchism, Aragorn! supported a number of elements derived from that philosophical tradition. For instance, he considered mutual aid to be a fundamental tenet of anarchism, despite its roots in the European intellectual tradition.

== Legacy ==
=== Aragorn! as an indicator for the birth of anarcho-indigenism ===
Some of his contributions in Green Anarchy, particularly his text titled 'Locating an Indigenous Anarchism', are seen as indicative of the emergence of an anarchist tendency specific to First Nations. His work is also noted for marking the penetration of the anarchist movement within these peoples.

Researcher Alexander Dunlap notes this influence, and historian Denisa Krásná describes it as follows:

Although Alfred was the first scholar to coin and theorize anarcho-Indigenism, its early foundations can be traced in the writings by the anarchist political theorist, publisher, and writer Aragorn!.

=== Influence of his digital initiatives ===
According to historian CEP, Aragorn! 'organized a portion of the movement's computer networks at the beginning of the 21st century', a situation explained by the significant role some of these initiatives played for anarchism in the 2000s and 2010s. For instance, The Anarchist Library alone is said to have gained a notable place in anarchist propaganda during the first decades of the century.

== Works ==
- The Prison-House of Color for Drift Line (2004)
- Locating An Indigenous Anarchism for the 19th issue of Green Anarchy (2005)
- Anarchy & Strategy for the 60th, 61st, 62th and 66th issues of Anarchy: A Journal of Desire Armed (2005–2008)
- Anarchy Summer Tour Burns Across the Country for the 62th issue of Anarchy: A Journal of Desire Armed (2006)
- A Non-European Anarchism for Ill Vox (2007)
- Review: Species Traitor #4 for the 63th issue of Anarchy: A Journal of Desire Armed (2007)
- To Dance With The Devil for the 64th issue of Anarchy: A Journal of Desire Armed (2007)
- Review: Riding the Wind by Peter Marshall in the same issue (2007)
- What Do Streams Want? for the 65th issue of Anarchy: A Journal of Desire Armed (2008)
- Review of Constituent Imagination for the 66th issue of Anarchy: A Journal of Desire Armed (2008)
- Review: Locked Up by Alfredo M. Bonanno for the 67th issue of Anarchy: A Journal of Desire Armed (2008)
- Review: Twilight of the Machines for the 69th issue of Anarchy: A Journal of Desire Armed (2009)
- To Publish in the same issue (2009)
- Anarchy and Nihilism: Consequences for Pistols Drawn (2009)
- Nihilism, Anarchy, and the 21st century for Pistols Drawn (2009)
- Have You Heard the News? for the 67th issue of Anarchy: A Journal of Desire Armed (2009)
- Toward a non European Anarchism or Why a movement is the last thing that people of color need for Geo Cities (2009)
- Anarchy Without Road Maps or Adjectives (2011)
- Interview with Klee Benally for the 1st and 2nd issues of Black Seed (2014)
- Political Naïveté: or what are we to do about Maoism for Anarchy Planet (2014)
- Indigeneity in the CA Bay Area for the 3rd issue of Black Seed (2015)
- Nihilist Animism for the 4th issue of Black Seed (2015)
- In Defense of Bob Black (2015)
- The Fight for Turtle Island, Ardent Press (2018)

== Bibliography ==
- CEP (2026), "Aragorn! [dit "Aragorn !", "Aragorn Bang"]", Dictionnaire international des militant·e·s anarchistes, Paris
