= Invisible Party =

Invisible Party Osynliga partiet
- Ideology: Anti-capitalism; Autonomism
- Colors: Transparency

Website
- www.osynligapartiet.se

The Invisible Party (Swedish: Osynliga partiet) was a Swedish conceptual anti-capitalist media campaign masquerading as an "organization" with the purpose of connecting all anti-capitalist action, however small or without actual realization, to an "invisible" political party.

Although it called itself a party, it did not have official members but instead had participants. It could not, and did not wish to, participate in elections. The professed goal of the group was to undermine the capitalist system.

The Invisible Party "disbanded" after a September 16, 2006 press release by the "central committee" behind the campaign declaring that they would discontinue their activities:

This chapter of history that we have told over the last six months is now over. We chose to illustrate the possibilities of the invisible class spirit through a campaign where we showed different aspects of the struggle that goes on in the shadows. All actions performed during the campaign followed their own logic, had their own purposes and their own meaning without the words that describes them. All we did was talk about that which was previously invisible, and now it will become invisible yet again. statement from the Invisible Party central committee, September 16, 2006.

== Ideology ==
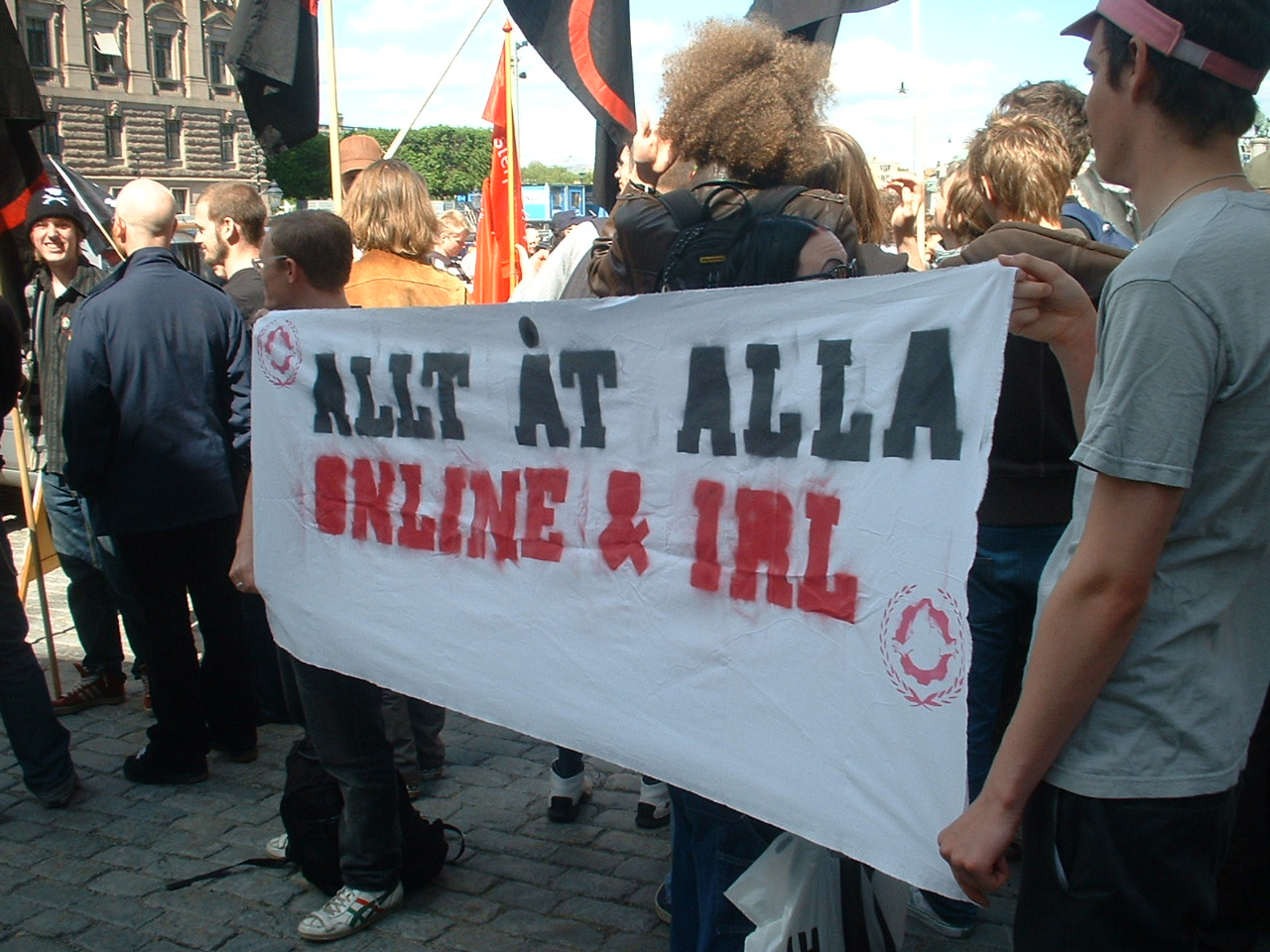
An Invisible Party banner at a demonstration in Stockholm, June 3, 2006 organized by the Pirate Party amongst others. The banner reads: "Everything for everyone. Online & IRL".

The Invisible Party can be seen as a shared concept, a symbol for a struggle against capitalism and the perceived exploitation of the workforce. Participation in the party has involved strikes, blockades, flyposting, sabotage, shoplifting, riots, and other radical tactics.

Anna-Lena Lodenius, a Swedish author on political extremism, has described the Invisible Party as follows:

It's about groups who see themselves as some kind of elite, a moral elite who goes in front and changes the reality. Then all we others are going to understand that it was all for our best. They don't respect the democracy and the representative democratic system.

The leftist website Motkraft described the views of the group as follows:

We have already made our choices! At workplaces, at school, and amongst unemployed the class struggle is ever present, invisible and faceless. These struggles are the Invisible Party. Every time you refuse to obey your boss, or cheat on an exam, or screw that job application-course, you're not alone. You're part of the Invisible Party, the actual movement that undermines capitalism.

== Methods ==
After the Centre Party proposed a special youth contract for those under 26 (similar to France's First Employment Contract policy), activists claiming to be members of the Invisible Party responded by vandalizing Centre Party offices throughout Sweden. The Centre Party was in opposition at the time.

Activists under the banner of the Invisible Party continued the vandalism throughout the 2006 Swedish general election campaign, hitting the offices of the Christian Democrats, another opposition party, as well.

As of 2006, the Swedish Security Service (Säpo) was gathering information about the Invisible Party and its supporters.

== Controversy ==
The winner of the Swedish political reality show Toppkandidaterna (The Top Candidates), Petter Nilsson, donated 100,000 of his 250,000 SEK prize-money to the project. After the actions against the Centre Party, the party demanded that the license-funded public broadcaster SVT should ask Nilsson to repay the money, and the Centre Party Youth claimed that SVT was "responsible for the attacks", but SVT chose not to take any action against Nilsson.

== See also ==
- Anarchism
- Alter-globalization (or Anti-globalization)
- Direct action
- Distributive justice
- The Invisible Committee
- The Global Economy
- Politics of Sweden
