= John Papworth =

British clergyman, activist and localist writer (1921–2020)

The Reverend John Papworth

Personal details
- Born: 12 December 1921 Shoreditch, England
- Died: 4 July 2020 (aged 98) Purton, Wiltshire, England
- Spouse: Marcelle Fouquet (m. 1963)
- Occupation: Anglican minister; writer; activist
- Movement: Localism; antimilitarism; ecologism
- Known for: Founding Resurgence, controversial comment on supermarket shoplifting
- Nickname: The shoplifting vicar

John Papworth (12 December 1921 – 4 July 2020) was an English clergyman, writer and activist. Throughout his life, he campaigned for the causes of antimilitarism, localism and ecologism. He founded Resurgence magazine and wrote in numerous other journals.

In 1997, his controversial views on shoplifting in supermarkets attracted international attention.

== Biography ==
Born in Shoreditch on 12 December 1921, John Papworth was the natural son of Jane Amelia Papworth, a housemaid. Unable to support him, she left John to an orphanage in Hornchurch, Essex. She later married and had three other children, but he hadn't much contact with them. He never knew his father.

He described his living conditions in the orphanage as "very miserable". At age 14, he left to work as a baker's boy, but was depressed and attempted suicide three times. Then, he lived in the streets until being picked up by the police, who took him to a Salvation Army shelter. After that, he became a school chef and later joined the Home Guard during World War II. Too deaf to become a pilot, he served seven years as a military cook for the Royal Air Force.

After the war, Papworth started studies at the London School of Economics. Although he didn't pursue them, he had time to become the friend and disciple of R. H. Tawney, who inspired his decentralist ideas and introduced him to a circle of radical thinkers.

After a brief time in the Communist Party and then the Labour Party, he got disillusioned with large organisations and bureaucracy. He subsequently focused on activism in favor of various causes, and editorial work about localism.

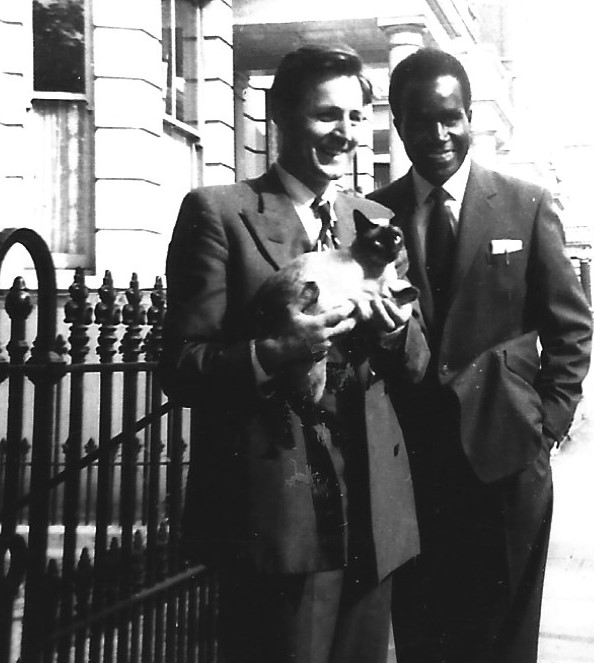
John Papworth (holding a kitten) and Kenneth Kaunda in London during the early 1960s

In 1969, he emigrated to Zambia on the request of Kenneth Kaunda, the first president of the country, to be his personal advisor. The two previously met in London through the Movement for Colonial Freedom.

First describing himself as "if not an atheist, then an agnostic", he later changed his views and stated that "modern attempt to live without God had failed". He subsequently trained to be a vicar and, at age 55, became an ordained minister of the Church of England, serving in a number of parishes. Starting in the diocese of Lusaka, Zambia (1976–1981), he then joined the diocese of London (1981–1997) until his controversial statement on shoplifting, after which he got debarred.

A long-time resident of London, he later moved to Purton, Wiltshire. He edited a village magazine called Purton Today and was elected as a parish councillor.

With his wife Marcelle, they had two sons and a daughter. Marcelle died in 1995, and John in 2020. He wasn't certain about the existence of an afterlife, and stated that one life was very much enough for him. In his obituary, The Daily Telegraph described the "turbulent priest" as being, "at various times, a communist, cook, beggar, editor, presidential adviser, parliamentary candidate and prisoner".

== Political activism ==
=== In political parties ===
During World War II, he had joined the Communist Party, but objected to its authoritarianism and was ejected. He then turned to fabianism and joined the Labour Party, of which he was the unsuccessful candidate for Salisbury at the 1955 general election. However, he got disillusioned with the bureaucratism. He recalled an event after which he quit:

"I was having a conversation with an MP, Anne Kerr. She asked if I was interested in getting adopted as a candidate for a by-election seat somewhere in the north. I said, 'well I don’t know anybody up there, and nobody up there knows me'. And she said very smoothly, 'well, these things can be arranged'. And that just echoed in my head."

He developed an opposition to large state and mass organisations and a preference for the small community. He came to believe democracies dominated by remote party organisations could not meet people's needs or stop war.

=== Activism ===
Papworth was committed against militarism, and particularly against the threats of nuclear proliferation. He was the secretary of the Committee of 100, and was put in Brixton prison along with Bertrand Russell for "incitement to public disorder" during a demonstration on 17 September 1961.

In 1962, convinced that Britain needed a political revolution, he flew to Cuba with hope to ask Fidel Castro how to spark one. There, he met a French woman, Michelle Fouquet, and they got married a year later.

In 1963, he went to the US and joined the Committee for Non-Violent Action. On 27 Jan 1964, he got imprisoned during a march for civil rights and disarmament near Turner Air Force Base in Albany, Georgia. To protest against the deplorable conditions of detention, Papworth and his fellow CNVA comrades started a hunger strike. His treatment was raised in the House of Commons of the United Kingdom. The marchers were released on 22 Feb 1964.

He performed an individual sit-in on the zebra crossing of Abbey Road, London, to denounce the use of car and promote public transportation. He was arrested and detained in Paddington Green police station, and asked to be charged rather than accepting a caution; he was subsequently released without charge.

In 1997, Papworth admitted that he had helped to hide convicted spy and double-agent George Blake at his home in Earl's Court, London after his escape from prison in October 1966. Blake had been aided in his escape by "Ban the Bomb" campaigners, including Sean Bourke. He was not charged as a result of the incident.

In 2001, Papworth refused to return his census form, stating the government had no right to such information. He was fined £120.

== Editorial work ==
In 1966, he joined like-minded localist thinkers E. F. Schumacher, Leopold Kohr and Sir Herbert Read, and founded and edited Resurgence magazine. After leaving Resurgence, he founded Fourth World Review, a magazine which promoted "small nations, governed by small communities". From 1968 the publication sponsored several "Assemblies of the Fourth World"; these brought together people from around the world who envisioned creating a new society of small communities, small enterprises, and self-government in industry, public utilities, universities, etc. Papworth also stood for UK Parliament as a "Fourth World" candidate.

In the 1970s and early 1980s, Papworth wrote regularly for the pacifist newspaper Peace News.

== Teachings ==
=== Shoplifting advocacy ===
During a neighbourhood watch committee in London on 19 March 1997, at age 75, Papworth made some remarked comments on shoplifting in supermarket chains. He felt that the big companies, unlike traditional small businesses, were "places of evil and temptation" and destroyers of local communities. He stated:

"If somebody takes goods from their local store without paying for them, that’s illegal and it’s immoral. If they take goods from giant supermarkets, it may be illegal but it’s not immoral, because Jesus said 'Love your neighbour' – he said nothing about loving Marks & Spencer".

Furthermore, he didn't regard it as stealing, but "as a badly needed reallocation of economic resources". He also added:

"When you talk about stealing, you can only steal from a person, you can only have a moral relationship with a person, you don’t have a moral relationship with things – that is a power relationship".

He confessed that he, too, shoplifted when he was a child, and would do it again if he had the courage. The archdeacon of Charing Cross subsequently barred him from preaching, and Home Secretary Michael Howard called the comments "disgraceful". In return, Papworth described the Church as "intellectually comatose and spiritually moribund".

=== Redraft of the Ten Commandments ===
John Papworth proposed a redraft of the Ten Commandments, which he considered somewhat outdated. He presents some of them in the documentary "The Turbulent Priest":

- "Thou shalt enjoy the gift of sex I have given thee, but thou shalt not procreate excessively." Papworth added that he supported homosexuality and family planning, and was concerned with human overpopulation.
- "Open your heart to love and compassion and resolve disputes without violence."
- "Thou shalt venerate thy family and thy human-scale neighbourhood above all other forms and degrees of human association."
- "Thou shalt not pollute the earth nor the waters, nor shalt thou toxify the air I have given thee to breathe."
- "Thou shalt live simply and truthfully and not waste the finite resources of the earth which I have bestowed for thee and for all generations."

== See also ==
=== Bibliography ===
- Economic aspects of the humanist revolution of our time, NECZAM, 1973
- New Politics, Garlandfold, 1982
- Small Is Powerful: The Future as if People Really Mattered, Praeger Publishing, 1995 ISBN 978-0275954246
- Shut Up and Listen: A New Handbook for Revolutionaries, self-published, 1997
- Village Democracy, Volume 25 of Societas (Imprint Academic), Societas Series, Ingram Publishing Services, 2006, ISBN 184540064X
- Co-editor with Ernst Friedrich Schumacher, A Pair of Cranks: A Compendium of Essays by Two of the Most Influential and Challenging Authors of the 20th Century (Selected essays by E. F. Schumacher and Leopold Kohr), New European, 2003, ISBN 1872410189

=== Documentaries ===
- No Man is an Island, a documentary about the local community life on Rathlin Island. Aired on BBC2, 1 May 1992.
- The Turbulent Priest, a documentary about his life and philosophy. Made by the London International Film School and aired on BBC, 1997.

== See also ==
- Anti-consumerism
- Anti-war movement
- Autoreduction
- Christian anarchism
- Distributism
- Humanistic economics
- Localism (politics)
- Moderately prosperous society
- Post-growth
- Shoplifters of the World Unite
- Small Is Beautiful
