= Julien Coupat =

French activist

Julien Coupat (French: [kupa]; born June 4, 1974, Bordeaux) is a French appellist and political activist. As one of the Tarnac Nine, he was arrested on November 11, 2008 and accused of terrorism in connection with a plot to sabotage French train lines. Coupat spent over six months in jail before being released on bail; he was held for a significantly longer period than other members of the Tarnac Nine because French police believed him to be the leader of the group, which they described as an anarchist cell.

Since the time of the 2008 arrests, the legal case against Coupat and the other members of the Tarnac Nine had weakened. On August 7, 2015, French judge Jeanne Duyé ordered that the specifically terrorist related charges against the group and against Coupat be dropped; On January 10, 2017, the French Supreme Court upheld this decision. Following this, Coupat and the other members of the Tarnac Nine were still expected to face various lesser charges. On April 12, 2018, Coupat and other members of the Tarnac Nine were acquitted of the most significant remaining charges, particularly conspiracy and sabotage, although some members were still convicted of lesser, symbolic charges, and ordered to pay fines.

== Biography ==
Julien Coupat is the son of a medical doctor and a theater troupe director. After studying business at the École supérieure des sciences économiques et commerciales (ESSEC), he switched to social sciences at the École des hautes études en sciences sociales (EHESS) but did not complete his doctorate. In 1999, he co-founded a radical philosophy magazine called Tiqqun before setting up a commune in 2005 in the village of Tarnac in the Corrèze department where he and his friends ran a farm and an all-purpose store.

== The TGV sabotage affair ==
On the night of 7–8 November 2008, Coupat and his partner Yildune Lévy went for a car ride and played cat-and-mouse with police cars following them. Their trip included a 20-minute stop in Dhuisy, in the Seine-et-Marne department, by their account for a sex session in the vehicle. Their car was parked near a train line in one of the locations where iron hooks were left dangling from the overhead lines that night, paralysing the high-speed TGV network.

On November 11, gendarmes raided the Tarnac farm and arrested nine residents in connection with the sabotage. Four of the nine were released on November 15, under conditions. A further three were released on December 2, and the last but one, Lévy, on January 16, 2009. Coupat remained in jail until May 28, 2009, when he was released under bail with instructions to remain in the Paris region and have no contacts with the other 8.

== Controversy ==
The arrests were publicly applauded by Interior minister Michèle Alliot-Marie who described the suspects as "an anarcho-autonomist cell" and Coupat as its leader. A judge first ordered Coupat's release on December 19, 2008, but the judicial services immediately appealed, using a highly unusual procedure. The French police said he was part of the Invisible Committee of the book The Coming Insurrection, which was denied by the publisher and Julien Coupat himself.

== See also ==
- The Coming Insurrection
- The Invisible Committee
- Tarnac Nine
- Tiqqun
