= The Invisible Committee =

Anonymous author or authors

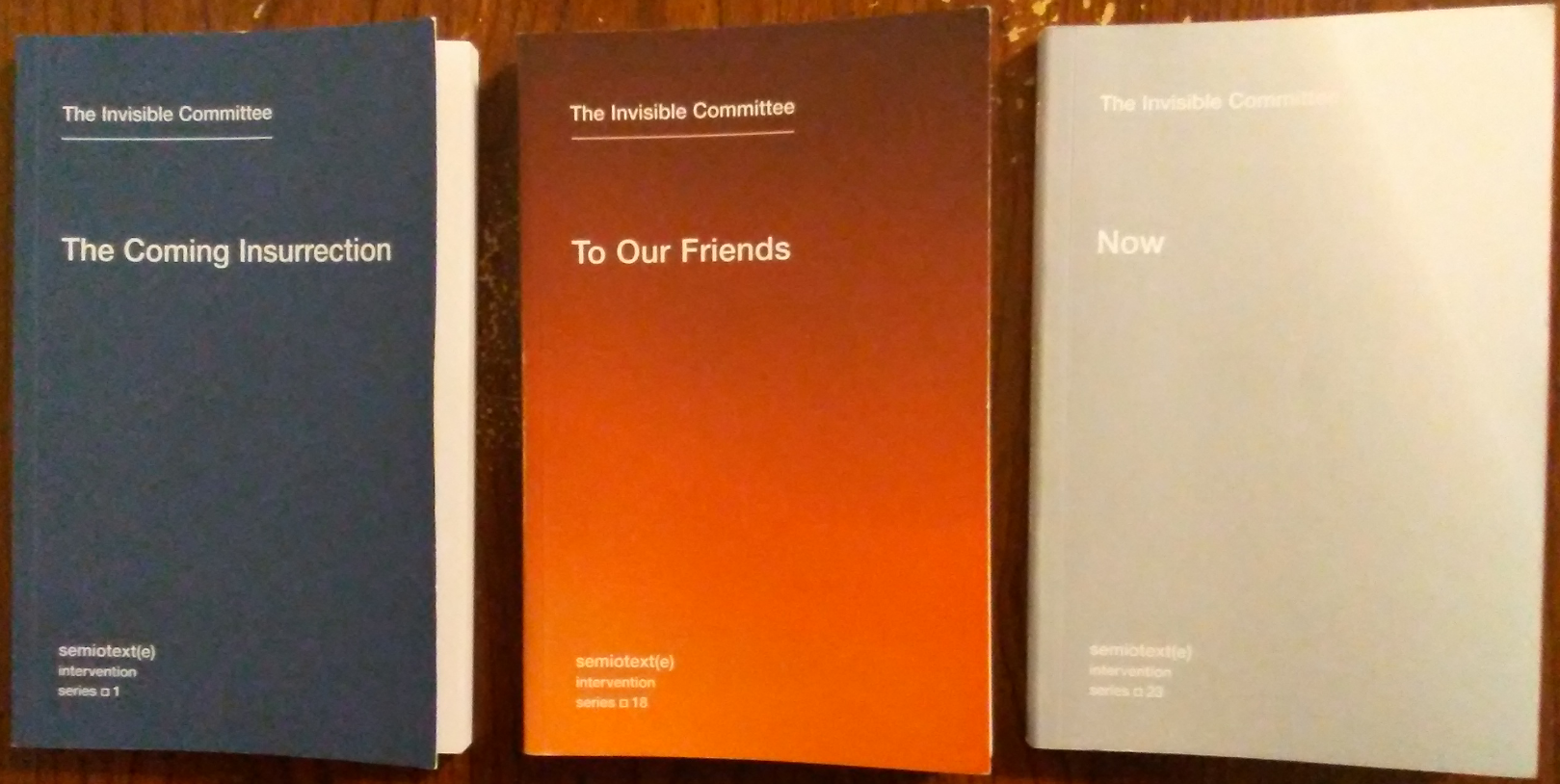
English-language books by the Invisible Committee

The Invisible Committee (French: le Comité invisible) is the nom de plume of an anonymous author or authors who have written French works of literature based on far-left politics and communization. The identity of the Invisible Committee has been associated with the Tarnac Nine, a group of people including Julien Coupat who were arrested "on the grounds that they were to have participated in the sabotage of overhead electrical lines on France's national railways."

The Invisible Committee is classified as ultra-left by the Ministry of the Interior of the second Fillon government. For its part, the Committee rejects the label “ultra-left,” “not because of its police-related connotations, but because of the ambivalence inherent in the term”. It advocates a “communism of singularities” and traces its roots to the autonomous movement. Denying the label of "author", this committee claims to be an "instance of strategic enunciation for the revolutionary movement".

The Invisible Committee is considered influential within the radical left in France as well as, at times, among some young people. For example, the French philosopher Judith Revel stated in 2018: “The recent writings of the Invisible Committee [...] are extremely popular among young people, and particularly among students.” More recently, in explaining the 2026 high school and college student movement in France, the German newspaper Die Welt referred to the simultaneous release of Manuel de survie (Survival Manual).

== Works ==
=== Books ===
- The Invisible Committee (2009). The Coming Insurrection. Los Angeles, CA: Semiotext(e). ISBN 9781584350804.
- The Invisible Committee (2015). To Our Friends. South Pasadena, CA: Semiotext(e). ISBN 9781584351672.
- The Invisible Committee (2017). Now. South Pasadena, CA: Semiotext(e). ISBN 9781635900071.

=== Untranslated Books ===
- Comité invisible (2026). Manuel de survie. Paris: La Fabrique.

=== Others ===
- The Invisible Committee (2026). “Becoming Alive, Autonomous, and Explosive” in Ill Will.

== See also ==
- Insurrectionary anarchism
- Invisible Party
- Situationist International
- Tiqqun
