= Tarnac =

- Commune
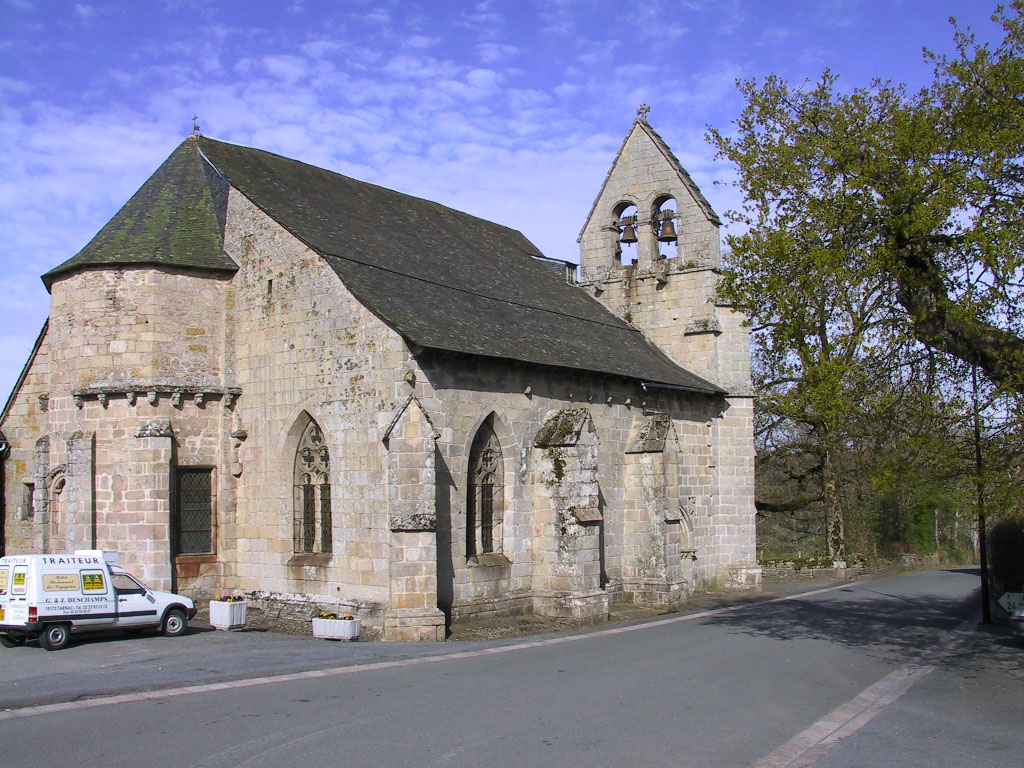
- The church of Saint-Georges, in Tarnac

- Coat of arms
- Location of Tarnac
- Location within France Location within Nouvelle-Aquitaine
- Coordinates: 45°40′52″N 1°56′52″E
- Country: France
- Region: Nouvelle-Aquitaine
- Department: Corrèze
- Arrondissement: Tulle
- Canton: Plateau de Millevaches

Government
  - Mayor (2026–32): Christophe Bayle
- Area^{1}: 67.46 km^{2} (26.05 sq mi)
- Highest elevation: 878 m (2,881 ft)
- Lowest elevation: 533 m (1,749 ft)
- Population (2023): 333
  - Density: 4.94/km^{2} (12.8/sq mi)
- Time zone: UTC+01:00 (CET)
  - Summer (DST): UTC+02:00 (CEST)
- INSEE/Postal code: 19265 /19170
- ^{1} French Land Register data, which excludes lakes, ponds, glaciers > 1 km^{2} (0.386 sq mi or 247 acres) and river estuaries.

Tarnac (French pronunciation: [taʁnak]) is a commune in the Corrèze department in central France.

== Toponymy ==
The toponym is of Gallo-Roman origin, or even Celtic. Marcel Villoutreix wrote that, Tarnac comes from a Gallic or Latin man's name, Tarinus; Jean-Paul Savignac said it was based on the theonym Taranus, better known in the form of Taranis, the Gallic god of thunder. But a third author, Xavier Delamarre, connects both Tarinus and Taranus to a root taro meaning "who crosses". It is true that near Tarnac, the Vienne river valley is very steep and gives the impression of crossing the mountain.

== Geography ==
=== Location and access ===
A commune in the Massif Central, Tarnac is located in the Corrèze department with the village at 700m. It borders the departments of Creuse and Haute-Vienne.

It is located on the Plateau de Millevaches, 11 km north of Bugeat and 30 km northwest of Meymac and 42 km from the sub-prefecture of Ussel.

== Population ==
Historical population
Year	Pop.	±% p.a.
1968	546	—
1975	506	−1.08%
1982	472	−0.99%
1990	403	−1.96%
1999	356	−1.37%
2007	327	−1.06%
2012	315	−0.74%
2017	339	+1.48%
2023	333	−0.30%
Source: INSEE

== Places and monuments ==
Several buildings are listed as historical monuments:

- l'église Saint-Georges - a romanesque style church built in the 12th and 13th-centuries, listed in 1919. It was restored in 1960. The aspe has canted corners, the chancel ispolygon-shaped with flat buttresses, while the nave is in the romanesque style. The altarpiece dates from the 17th-century and the is a polychrome wood statue featuring Saint George. The portal is a gothic from 14th-century with archivolts and two sculpted medallions of Saint George and Saint Giles.
- a 17th-century castle owned by Yves de Kerdrel, the façade and roof have been listed since 1989,
- Village of Puy-Murat - remains of a medieval complex listed in 1993,
- la Fontaine Saint-George - fountain feeds an 18th-century washhouse.
- Two monumental oak trees - planted on the Place de l'Eglise. The younger tree was planted in 1848, commemorating the creation of the French Second Republic and is therefore known as the "liberty tree".

== Personalities linked to the commune ==
- Yves de Kerdrel, journalist, director of Valeurs Actuelles and owner of the village castle,
- Julien Coupat, implicated and then acquitted in the case of sabotage of the TGV lines in 2008,
- Armand Gatti, poet, playwright, director and filmmaker, joined the maquis and was arrested in 1943 in Tarnac,
- Jean-Marie Gleize, writer, 1946-2026.

== See also ==
- Communes of the Corrèze department
- Tarnac Nine
