= Autoreduction =

Anti-capitalist form of protest

Autoreduction (from the French term autoréduction) is an anti-capitalist and collective practice by a group of people to impose a lower price for a product or service until it is free. A group of consumers take upon themselves to reduce the price of some good or service, and act collectively. This could include collectively engaging in shoplifting, avoiding paying transit fares or for movie tickets, or calling in sick for work. The targeted service or product is generally considered by activists as being essential and should be available on an equal basis to all people. Critics of autoreduction do not distinguish between this practice and criminal theft or robbery.

The action includes various forms of non-payment for goods or services. It can result from refusal to pay for an increase in rent or utilities such as electricity, gas, or water. It may be done with the aim of redistributing goods to those in need.

== Historical examples ==
In Italy, rent strikes are numerous and affected several large cities (Rome, Milan, and Turin) in the mid-1970s. This reappropriation of the proletarian practice was systematized by the autonomous movement and also spoke of immediate communism. In France, this was the case in the rent strike in Sonacotra in 1975.

The Autonomia movement in 1977 involved activities of autoreduction, and resulted in the creation of spaces where anti-capitalist principles are popular, among related themes in punk and hardcore music.

The movement of the unemployed (Mouvement des chômeurs) of the year 1997–1998, under a socialist government (cohabitation Jospin-Chirac) organized numerous actions of self-discounting in supermarkets and other food stores. It also allowed a popularization of this practice, directly linked to the French autonomous movement which was already on its way out before 1995.

After a lull in autoreduction practices, there was a renewed interest in it beginning in 2008. The social crisis caused by market speculation appeared to be a favorable environment for its revival. In late 2008, several autoreduction actions were organized by political groups made up of precarious workers, the unemployed, intermittent workers, and students, including in Paris, Rennes, and Grenoble.

== Requisitions in supermarkets ==
Autoreduction may also be applied to food in supermarkets. This action involves shopping for food and refusing to pay. After blocking checkout lanes in protest, a dialogue is initiated with store management. The time for which the checkouts are blocked may represent a loss to the company, as some customers decide to abandon their purchases because of the situation. If management agrees to allow the militants to leave with their shopping carts, it is not legally a flight but extortion. Requisitioned products are then collectively shared or distributed to show the militant and selfless character of the action.

== Public transit ==
Autoreduction in public transportation involves travelling in large numbers via public transit without paying, typically while distributing leaflets to other passengers, with the aim of making public transport free. This approach has an ecological dimension, as making public transport free would encourage its use and reduce private vehicle travel, thereby reducing pollution. This type of action has been used by environmentalist movements such as the Camp for Climate Action.

On October 14, 2019, secondary and college students organized to massively evade the ticket machines in Santiago Metro, the reason being a rise of 30 Chilean pesos in the fare. In the span of a week, these protests escalated to the destruction of the metro and the close of the service. These events lead to what became the Estallido Social in Chile, showing the value of autoreduction as a valuable tool in the class struggle.

== See also ==
- John Papworth
