= Kathy Acker =

American novelist and playwright (1947–1997)

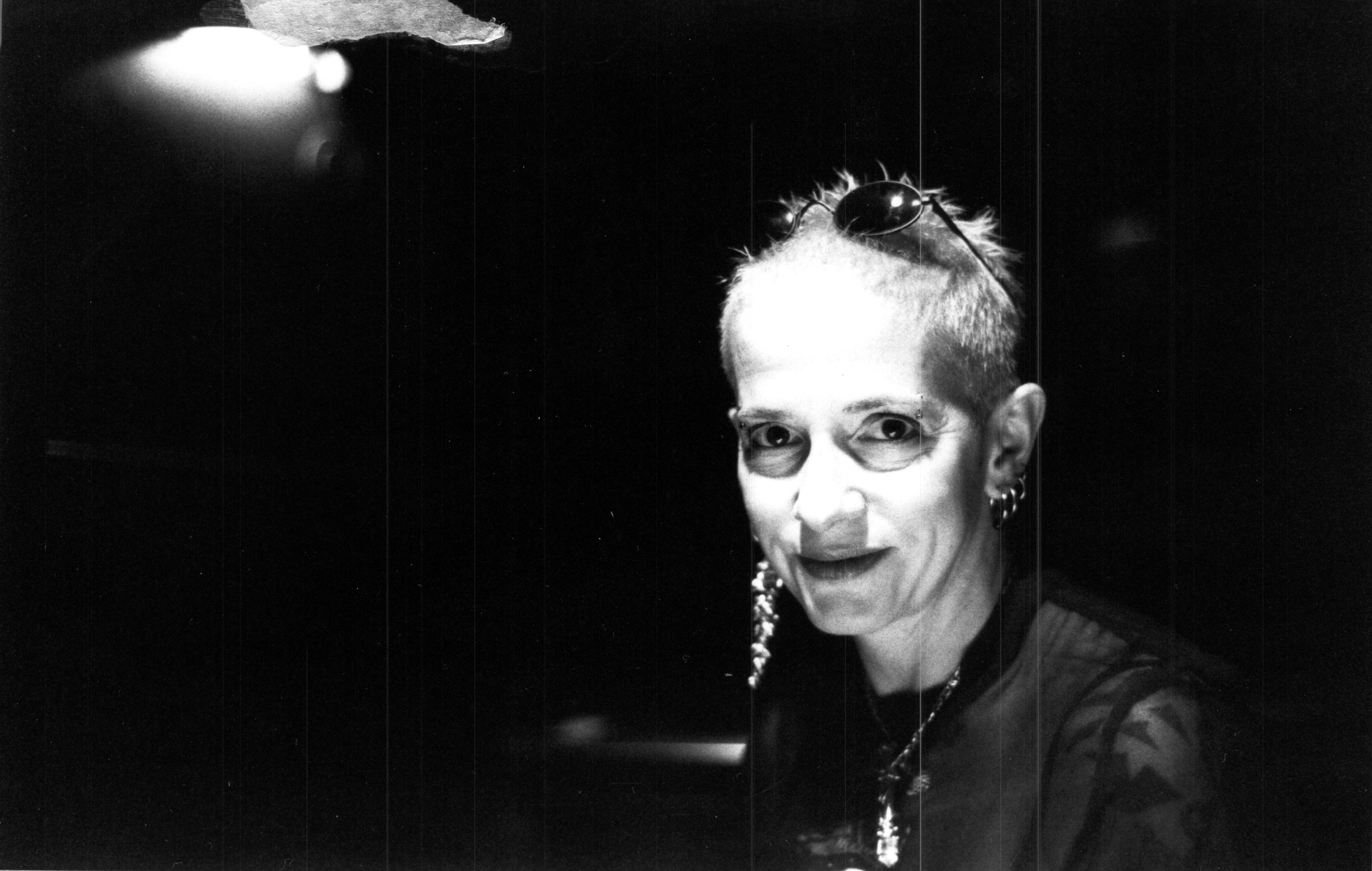
- Acker in 1996
- Born: Karen Lehman; April 18, 1947 (disputed); New York City, U.S.
- Died: November 30, 1997 (aged 50); Tijuana, Baja California, Mexico
- Occupations: Novelist; poet; playwright; essayist; critic; performance artist
- Spouse(s): Robert Acker (1966–19??); Peter Gordon (1976; annulled)
- Writing career
- Notable works: Blood and Guts in High School (novel); Great Expectations; New York (short story)
- Notable awards: Pushcart Prize (1979)
- Movement: Postmodernism; Post-structuralism; Post-structural feminism; Blank Generation; New Narrative

Kathy Acker (April 18, 1947 [disputed] – November 30, 1997) was an American experimental novelist, poet, playwright, essayist, critic, performance artist, and postmodernist writer, known for her idiosyncratic and transgressive writing that dealt with complex themes such as childhood trauma, sexuality, language, identity, and rebellion. Her writing incorporates pastiche and the cut-up technique, involving cutting-up and scrambling passages and sentences; she also defined her writing as existing in the post-nouveau roman European tradition. In her texts, she combines biographical elements, power, sex and violence.

== Biography ==
=== Early life ===
The only child of Donald and Claire (nee Weill) Lehman, Acker was born Karen Lehman in New York City in 1947, although the Library of Congress gives her birth year as 1948, while the editors of Encyclopædia Britannica gave her birth year as April 18, 1948, New York, New York, U.S. She died on November 30, 1997, in Tijuana, Mexico. Most obituaries, including The New York Times, cited her birth year as 1944.

Her family was from a wealthy, assimilated German-Jewish background that was culturally but not religiously Jewish. Her maternal grandmother, Florence Weill, was an Austrian Jew who had inherited a small fortune from her husband's glove-making business. Acker's grandparents went into political exile from Alsace-Lorraine prior to World War I, due to the rising nationalism of pre-Nazi Germany, moving to Paris and then to the United States. According to Acker, her grandparents were "first generation French-German Jews" whose ancestors originally hailed from the Pale of Settlement. In an interview with the magazine Tattoo Jew, Acker stated that religious Judaism "means nothing to me. I don't run away from it, it just means nothing to me" and elaborated that her parents were "high-German Jews" who held cultural prejudices against Yiddish-speaking Eastern European Jews. ("I was trained to run away from Polish Jews.")

Acker was raised in her mother and stepfather's home in the Sutton Place neighborhood of Manhattan's prosperous Upper East Side. Her father, Donald Lehman, abandoned the family before Acker's birth. Her relationship with her domineering mother, even into adulthood, was fraught with hostility and anxiety because Acker felt unloved and unwanted. Her mother soon remarried, to Albert Alexander, whose surname Kathy, née Karen, was given, although the writer later described her mother's union with Alexander as a passionless marriage to an ineffectual man. Kathy had a half-sister, Wendy, by her mother's second marriage, but the two women were never close and long estranged. By the time of Acker's death, she had requested that her friends not contact Wendy, as some had suggested. In 1978 her mother, Claire Alexander, committed suicide. As an adult, Acker tried to track down her father, but abandoned her search after she discovered that her father had disappeared after killing a trespasser on his yacht and spending six months in a psychiatric asylum until the state dismissed the murder charges.

=== Education ===
Acker attended the Lenox School, a private school for girls on the Upper East Side. As an undergraduate at Brandeis University, she studied Classics and "took advantage of loosened mores, attending orgies thrown by theatre kids." In 1966, she married Robert Acker, and took his surname. Robert Acker was the son of lower-middle-class Polish-Jewish immigrants. Her mother and stepfather had hoped she would marry a wealthy man and did not expect the marriage to Acker to last long. She became interested in writing novels and, with Robert, moved to California to attend University of California, San Diego, where David Antin, Eleanor Antin, and Jerome Rothenberg were among her teachers. She received her bachelor's degree in 1968. After moving to New York, she attended two years of graduate school at the City College of New York in Classics, specializing in Greek. She did not earn a graduate degree. During her time in New York, she was employed as a file clerk, secretary, stripper, and porn performer.

=== Start of career and relationships ===
Although her birth name was Karen, she was known as Kathy to her friends and family. Her first work appeared in print as part of the burgeoning New York City literary underground of the mid-1970s. During the 1970s, Acker often moved back and forth between San Diego, San Francisco, and New York, becoming a fixture of the downtown scene in the East Village. In February 1978, she married the composer and experimental musician Peter Gordon due to a cancer scare, and the pair ended their seven-year relationship shortly afterward. Later, she had relationships with the theorist, publisher, and critic Sylvère Lotringer and then with the filmmaker and film theorist Peter Wollen, as well as a brief affair with media theorist and scholar McKenzie Wark. In 1996, Acker left San Francisco and moved to London to live with the writer and music critic Charles Shaar Murray. She married twice. She was openly bisexual, and identified as queer.

In 1979, she won the Pushcart Prize for her short story "New York City in 1979." During the early 1980s, she lived in London, where she wrote several of her most critically acclaimed works. After returning to the United States in the late 1980s, she worked as an adjunct professor at the San Francisco Art Institute for about six years and as a visiting professor at several universities, including the University of Idaho, the University of California, San Diego (UC-San Diego), University of California, Santa Barbara (UC-Santa Barbara), the California Institute of Arts, and Roanoke College.

In July 1989, Acker was involved in a literary controversy when the trade periodical Publishers Weekly revealed that around four pages from Harold Robbins' novel The Pirate (1974) had been lifted without permission and integrated into Acker's novel The Adult Life of Toulouse Lautrec (1975), which had recently been re-published in the UK in a selection of early works by Acker titled Young Lust (1989). After Paul Gitlin saw the exposé in Publishers Weekly, he informed Robbins' UK publisher, Hodder & Stoughton, who requested that Acker's publisher Unwin Hyman withdraw and pulp Young Lust. Representatives for Acker explained that she was well known for her deliberate use of literary appropriation—or bricolage, a postmodern technique akin to plagiarism in which fragments of pre-existing works are combined along with original writings to create new literary works. After an intervention by William S. Burroughs—a novelist who used appropriation in his own works of the 1960s—Robbins issued a statement to give Acker retroactive permission to appropriate from his work, avoiding legal action on his publisher's part.

=== Later life and death ===
In April 1996, Acker was diagnosed with breast cancer and she elected to have a double mastectomy. In January 1997, she wrote about her loss of faith in conventional medicine in a Guardian article, "The Gift of Disease."

In the article, she explains that after unsuccessful surgery, which left her feeling physically mutilated and emotionally debilitated, she rejected the passivity of the patient in the medical mainstream and began to seek out the advice of nutritionists, acupuncturists, psychic healers, and Chinese herbalists. She found appealing the claim that instead of being an object of knowledge, as in Western medicine, the patient becomes a seer, a seeker of wisdom, that illness becomes the teacher and the patient the student. After pursuing several forms of alternative medicine in England and the United States, Acker died a year and a half later, on November 30, 1997, aged 50, from complications of cancer in a Tijuana alternative cancer clinic, the only alternative-treatment facility that accepted her with her advanced stage of cancer. She died in what was called "Room 101", to which her friend Alan Moore quipped, "There's nothing that woman can't turn into a literary reference." (Room 101, in the climax of George Orwell's Nineteen Eighty-Four, turns out to be the torture chamber in which the Inner Party subjects its political prisoners to their own worst fears.)

== Literary overview ==
Acker was associated with the New York punk movement of the late 1970s and early 1980s. The punk aesthetic influenced her literary style. In the 1970s, before the term "postmodernism" was popular, Acker began writing her books. These books contain features that would eventually be considered postmodernist work. Her controversial body of work borrows heavily from the experimental styles of William S. Burroughs and Marguerite Duras, with critics often comparing her writing to that of Alain Robbe-Grillet and Jean Genet. Critics have noticed links to Gertrude Stein and photographers Cindy Sherman and Sherrie Levine. She was influenced by the Black Mountain School poets, William S. Burroughs, David Antin, Carolee Schneeman, Eleanor Antin, French critical theory, syncretistic mysticism, and pornography, as well as classic literature.

=== Novels ===
Notwithstanding the increased recognition she garnered for Great Expectations, Blood and Guts in High School is often considered Acker's breakthrough work. She first began composing the book in 1973 while living in Solana Beach, writing and drawing fragments in notebooks before compiling the manuscript in 1979. Published in 1984, it is one of her most extreme explorations of sexuality and violence, critiquing the intersections of patriarchal capitalism, sexual oppression, systemic power dynamics and fragmented identity. Following a heavily surreal and frequently disrupted narrative, the book is written as a metafictional collage novel, variously incorporating letters, poems, translations, drama scenes, dream visions, and pornographic drawings. Borrowing from, among other texts, Nathaniel Hawthorne's The Scarlet Letter, Blood and Guts details the grotesque childhood experiences of Janey Smith, a chronically sex-addicted and pelvic inflammatory disease-ridden young urbanite who is infatuated with a supposed father who sells her into slavery and prostitution. In its original publications by Picador and Grove Press, the final two chapters were accidentally reversed from Acker's intended order; the mistake was corrected in the 2017 re-publication of the novel. Many critics initially criticized the book for the transgressive depictions of the abuse of women, and both Germany and South Africa banned it completely. Acker later published the German court judgement against Blood and Guts in High School in Hannibal Lecter, My Father. The book eventually amassed a posthumous cult following despite its highly controversial nature, and featured in Peter Boxall's 1001 Books You Must Read Before You Die.

After a series of failed contracts to publish Blood and Guts in High School, Acker made her British literary debut in 1984 when Picador published the novel, followed by publication in New York by Grove Press. That same year, she was signed by the aforementioned Grove Press, one of the legendary independent publishers committed to controversial and avant-garde writing; she was one of the last writers taken on by Barney Rosset before the end of his tenure there. Most of her work was published by them, including re-issues of important earlier work. She wrote for several magazines and anthologies, including the periodicals RE/Search, Angel Exhaust, monochrom and Rapid Eye. As she neared the end of her life, her work was more well-received by the conventional press; for example, The Guardian published a number of her essays, interviews, and articles, among them was an interview with the Spice Girls. In Memoriam to Identity draws attention to popular analyses of Rimbaud's life and The Sound and the Fury, constructing or revealing social and literary identity. Although known in the literary world for creating a whole new style of feminist prose and for her transgressive fiction, she was also a punk and feminist icon for her devoted portrayals of alternative subcultures, strong-willed women, and violence.

Acker published Empire of the Senseless in 1988, and considered it a turning point in her writing. While she still borrows from other texts, including Mark Twain's The Adventures of Huckleberry Finn, the appropriation is less obvious. However, one of Acker's more controversial appropriations is from William Gibson's 1984 text, Neuromancer, in which Acker equates code with the female body and its militaristic implications. In 1988, she published Literal Madness: Three Novels, which included three previously published works: Florida deconstructs and reduces John Huston's 1948 film noir Key Largo into its base sexual politics, Kathy Goes to Haiti details a young woman's relationship and sexual exploits while on vacation, and My Death My Life by Pier Paolo Pasolini provides a fictional autobiography of the Italian filmmaker in which he solves his own murder.

Between 1990 and 1993, she published four more books: In Memoriam to Identity (1990); Hannibal Lecter, My Father (1991); Portrait of an Eye: Three Novels (1992), also composed of already-published works; and My Mother: Demonology (1992). Her collection, Portrait of an Eye, was championed by publisher Fred Jordan, who had discovered her work at Grove Press before moving to Pantheon and sent an early copy of the book to William Burroughs in 1991. Her last novel, Pussy, King of the Pirates, was published in 1996, which she, Rico Bell, and the rest of rock band the Mekons also reworked into an operetta, which they performed at the Museum of Contemporary Art, Chicago, in 1997. Acker's novels exhibit a fascination with, and an indebtedness to, tattoos. She dedicated Empire of the Senseless to her tattooist. Her work often dealt with other themes of body modification as well, such as bodybuilding. She would outline this in such works as the 1993 essay Against Ordinary Language: The Language of the Body.

=== Poems and essays ===
Acker published her first book, Politics, in 1972. Although the collection of poems and essays did not garner much critical or public attention, it did establish her reputation within the New York punk scene. In 1973, she published her first novel (under the pseudonym Black Tarantula), The Childlike Life of the Black Tarantula: Some Lives of Murderesses. The following year, she published her second novel, I Dreamt I Was a Nymphomaniac: Imagining. Both works are reprinted in Portrait of an Eye.

=== Short stories ===
In 1979, she received popular attention after winning a Pushcart Prize for her short story "New York City in 1979." She did not receive critical attention, however, until publishing Great Expectations in 1982. The opening of Great Expectations is an obvious re-writing of Charles Dickens's work of the same name. It features her usual subject matter, including a semi-autobiographical account of her mother's suicide and the appropriation of several other texts, including Pierre Guyotat's violent and sexually explicit "Eden Eden Eden." That same year, Acker published a chapbook, entitled Hello, I'm Erica Jong. She appropriated from a number of influential writers. These writers include Charles Dickens, Nathaniel Hawthorne, John Keats, William Faulkner, James Joyce, T. S. Eliot, the Brontë sisters, the Marquis de Sade, Dante Alighieri, Georges Bataille, and Arthur Rimbaud.

=== Scripts ===
Acker wrote the script for the 1983 film Variety. Acker wrote a text on the photographer Marcus Leatherdale that was published in 1983, in an art catalogue for the Molotov Gallery in Vienna.

In 2007, Amandla Publishing re-published Acker's articles that she wrote for the New Statesman from 1989 to 1991. Grove Press published two unpublished early novellas in the volume Rip-Off Red, Girl Detective and The Burning Bombing of America, and a collection of selected work, Essential Acker, edited by Amy Scholder and Dennis Cooper in 2002.

=== Nonfiction ===
Three volumes of her non-fiction have been published and republished since her death. In 2002, New York University staged Discipline and Anarchy, a retrospective exhibition of her works, while in 2008, London's Institute of Contemporary Arts screened an evening of films influenced by Acker.

== Posthumous reputation ==
A collection of essays on Acker's work, titled Lust for Life: On the Writings of Kathy Acker, edited by Carla Harryman, Avital Ronell, and Amy Scholder, was published by Verso Books in 2006 and includes essays by Nayland Blake, Leslie Dick, Robert Glück, Carla Harryman, Laurence Rickels, Avital Ronell, Barrett Watten, and Peter Wollen. In 2009, the first collection of essays to focus on academic study of Acker, Kathy Acker and Transnationalism was published. In 2015, Semiotext(e) published I'm Very Into You, a book of Acker's email correspondence with media theorist McKenzie Wark, edited by Matias Viegener, her executor and head of the Kathy Acker Literary Trust. Her personal library is housed in a reading room at the University of Cologne in Germany, and her papers are divided between NYU's Fales Library and the Rubenstein Rare Book and Manuscript Library at Duke University. A limited body of her recorded readings and discussions of her works exists in the special collections archive of University of California, San Diego.

In 2013, the Acker Award was launched and named for Kathy Acker. Awarded to living and deceased members of the San Francisco or New York avant-garde art scene, the award is financed by Alan Kaufman and Clayton Patterson.

In 2017, American writer and artist Chris Kraus published After Kathy Acker: A Literary Biography, the first book-length biography of Acker's life experiences and literary strategies. American writer Douglas A. Martin published Acker. a book-length study of Acker's influences and artistic trajectory.

In 2018, British writer Olivia Laing published Crudo, a novel which references Acker's works and life, and whose main character is a woman called Kathy, suffering double breast cancer; yet the book's events are situated in August–September 2017. In 2019, Amy Scholder and Douglas A. Martin co-edited Kathy Acker: The Last Interview and Other Conversations. Kate Zambreno wrote on Kathy Acker in her essay "New York City, Summer 2013" published as part of the collection Screen Tests (Harpers Collins, 2019). The essay was originally published in Icon edited by Amy Scholder (Feminist Press, 2014). A number of other contemporary writers have described Acker as a key influence, including Isabel Waidner and Joanna Walsh. Kathleen Hanna recalled in her 2024 memoir Rebel Girl that a conversation with Acker in which she told her to start a band compelled her to start making music.

Between May 1, 2019 and August 4, 2019, the exhibition I, I, I, I, I, I, I, Kathy Acker was held at the Institute of Contemporary Arts, London. The exhibition featured works by more than 40 artists, such as Reza Abdoh, Johanna Hedva and Reba Maybury. In 2020, Grove Press issued a new edition of Portrait of an Eye, with an introduction by Kate Zambreno.

In November, 2022, the 25th anniversary of Acker's death, the Canadian journalist Jason McBride published Eat Your Mind: The Radical Life and Work of Kathy Acker, the first authorized full-length biography of Acker.

== Works based on her works ==
Steven Shaviro transformed Kathy Acker's works into an electronic literature piece, Doom Patrols in 1998. This was originally published in Beehive and is archived at The NEXT Museum, Library, and Preservation Space. Catherine Lacey's novel Biography of X is a fictional biography loosely based on aspects of Kathy Acker's life and work and uses appropriated texts as in Acker's work.

== Bibliography ==
=== Novels, stories ===
- Politics (1972; excerpts published in Hannibal Lecter, My Father (1991); full text published in Kathy Acker (1971–1975) (2019)
- The Burning Bombing of America: The Destruction of the United States (pub. 2002, from manuscript 1972)
- Rip-Off Red, Girl Detective (pub. 2002, from manuscript 1973)
- Childlike Life of the Black Tarantula By the Black Tarantula (1973)
- I Dreamt I Was a Nymphomaniac: Imagining (1974)
- Haiti: A Trip to the Voodoo Doctor (Travelers Digest Issue 1, Volume 1, 1977; later published in Kathy Goes to Haiti)
- Adult Life of Toulouse Lautrec (1978)
- Florida (1978)
- Kathy Goes to Haiti (1978)
- The Seattle Book: For Randy and Heather (1980, with illustrations)
- The Persian Poems by Janey Smith (Travelers Digest Issue 2, Volume 1, ed. Jeff Goldberg, 1980; poems from Blood and Guts in High School, with drawings by Robert Kushner, 1980)
- N.Y.C. in 1979 (1981)
- Hello, My Name Is Erica Jong (1982; also available in Blood and Guts in High School)
- Translations of the Diaries of Laure the Schoolgirl (1983)
- Implosion (1983; also available in My Death My Life by Pier Paolo Pasolini)
- Great Expectations (1983)
- Algeria: A Series of Invocations Because Nothing Else Works (1984)
- My Death My Life by Pier Paolo Pasolini (1984)
- Blood and Guts in High School (1984)
- Don Quixote: Which Was a Dream (1986)
- Lust: A Sailor's Slight Identity (1987, available in Hannibal Lecter, My Father)
- Literal Madness: Three Novels (Reprinted 1988; contains Kathy Goes to Haiti, My Death My Life by Pier Paolo Pasolini, Florida)
- Young Lust (1988; contains Kathy Goes to Haiti, The Adult Life of Toulouse Lautrec by Henri Toulouse Lautrec, and Florida)
- Empire of the Senseless (1988)
- In Memoriam to Identity (1990)
- Hannibal Lecter, My Father (1991)
- Portrait of an Eye (1992, includes early novels Childlike Life of the Black Tarantula By the Black Tarantula (1973); I Dreamt I Was a Nymphomaniac: Imagining (1974); Adult Life of Toulouse Lautrec (1978)
- My Mother: Demonology (1994)
- Pussycat Fever (with Diane Dimassa and Freddie Baer, illustrators, 1995)
- Pussy, King of the Pirates (1996)
- Portrait of an Eye: Three Novels (Reprinted 1998)
- Eurydice in the Underworld (1998)
- Essential Acker: The Selected Writings of Kathy Acker (2002)
- Kathy Acker (1971–1975) (2019, Éditions Ismael, 656 pgs.), ed. Justin Gajoux and Claire Finch, critical edition of unpublished early writings from 1971 to 1975

Some of the contents from * Kathy Acker (1971–1975) (2019, Éditions Ismael, 656 pgs.), ed. Justin Gajoux and Claire Finch, critical edition of unpublished early writings from 1971 to 1975

- The Golden Woman (poem, 1969–1970)
- Section from DIARY (1–2, 1971)
- Portraits (7, 1971)
- Portraits and Visions (summer 1971)
- Diary Warmcatfur (1, 1972)
- Politics (1972, full text)
- For H. (1972)
- Revolutionary Diary of an Anarchist (1972)
- Journal Black Cats Black Jewels (summer 1972)
- Gold Songs for Jimi Hendrix (1972)
- Breaking Up (summer 1972)
- [Letter to Berndadette Mayer] (fall 1972)
- Entrance into Dwelling in Paradise (poems, fall 1972)
- [Exercises] (fall 1972)
- Stripper Disintergration (2–3, 1973)
- Section from Diary (3, 1973)
- [Letter to Bernadette Mayer] (1973)
- The Beginning of the Thesmophoriazusae (7–9, 1973)
- Part I of Breaking Through Memories into Desire (11, 1973)
- Part II [of Breaking Through Memories...] (1, 1974)
- Conversations (1, 1974)
- [Letters to Alan Sondheim] (2–3, 1974)
- [Letter to Bernadette Mayer] (3/3/1974)

=== Poetry ===
This is not a complete list.

This symbol # indicates published in Kathy Acker (1971–1975) (2019, Éditions Ismael, 656 pgs.), ed. Justin Gajoux and Claire Finch, critical edition of unpublished early writings from 1971 to 1975

- The Golden Woman (poem, 1969–1970) #
- Journal Black Cats Black Jewels (summer 1972) #
- Gold Songs for Jimi Hendrix (1972) #
- Part I of Breaking Through Memories into Desire (11, 1973) #
- Part II [of Breaking Through Memories...] (1, 1974) #
- Baby don't give baby don't get (from the novel Florida)
- Homage to Leroi Jones (poems, pub. 2015 by Lost and Found: The CUNY Poetics Documents Initiative, from manuscript 1972)

Discussion/reading of two poems from the novel Blood and Guts in High School

=== Stage work ===
- Desire (Bomb 3, spring 1982)
- Lulu Unchained (drama, 1985, first performed at ICA; available in the novel Don Quixote: Which Was a Dream)
- The Birth of the Poet (drama, 1981; performed at the Brooklyn Academy of Music in 1985, directed by Richard Foreman; published in Eurydice in the Underworld; also in Wordplays 5: An Anthology of New American Drama, 1987)
- Requiem (drama, 1997; published in Eurydice in the Underworld)

=== Screenplay ===
- Variety (screenplay, 1985, directed by Bette Gordon; unpublished)

=== Recordings, music collabs ===
- Pussy (1994, produced by CodeX; contains two sections, O and Ange and Pussy, King of the Pirates: Her Story)
- The Stabbing Hand (1995) – spoken-word guest appearance on alternate mix of song by Oxbow, included on reissues of album Let Me Be a Woman
- Pussy, King of the Pirates (1996, Quarterstick Records) – Acker's operetta, performed and recorded by the Mekons with Kathy Acker
- Redoing Childhood (2000) spoken-word recording, KRS 349.

=== Essays (periodicals, book reviews, movie reviews, art reviews, speeches, and other texts) ===
This is not a complete list. The symbols ^^ indicate it's available at Duke University's collection of Kathy Acker's papers. The symbol # indicates the essay is included in the Kathy Acker collection Bodies of Work: Essays (London: Serpent's Tail, 1997).

- Notes on Writing from the Life of Baudelaire (1979^^)
- New York City 1983 (from Marcus Leatherdale: His photographs – a book in a series on people and years, with Christian Michelides, published by Wien, Molotov, 1983)
- Realism for the Cause of Future Revolution (from Art After Modernism: Rethinking Representation, 1984#)
- Collette (1985#)
- An Actual Institution of Art (1986^^)
- Introduction to collection Young Lust (1988)
- Introduction to Boxcar Bertha (1988#)
- A Few Notes on Two of my Books (from Review of Contemporary Fiction, vol 9, no. 3, Fall 1989#)
- Blue Valentine (1989^^)
- Review of Scandal for Weiner (1989^^)
- Low: Good and Evil in the Work of Nayland Blake (1990) A selection is available in the Kathy Acker collection Body of Works: Essays.
- The World According to Peter Greenway (from The Village Voice, volume 35, April 17, 1990#)
- In the Underworld (1990^^)
- William Burroughs' Realism (1990)
- From Counter-Culture to Culture, But Here's no Culture/Fuck Ecology and the Death of Communism/The Meaning of the 80s (1990^^)
- New York City 25/12/89-31/12/89 at the Edge of the New (1990^^)
- The Language of Sex The Sex of Language (1990)
- Critical Languages (1990#)
- Dead Doll Humility (1990).
- The Meaning of the Eighties (from The Village Voice, volume 35, January 2, 1990#)
- Bodybuilding (1991)
- The War at Home: Bonfire of the Vanities by Brian de Palma (1991^^)
- Red Wings: Concerning Richard Prince's "Spiritual America" (from Parkett, 1992#)
- Against Ordinary Language: The Language of the Body (from The Last Sex: Feminism and Outlaw Bodies, 1993#)
- Reading the Lack of the Body: The Writing of the Marquis de Sade (from The Divine Sade, 1994#)
- After the End of the Art World (1994^^)
- Statements on the Nature of Musical Comedy (1994^^)
- Seeing Gender (from Critical Quarterly, 1995#)
- Running through the World: On the Art of Kiki Smith (1995^^)
- Mirror: Two Works of Art (1995^^)
- Moving Into Wonder (An introduction to Time Capsule: A Concise Encyclopedia by Women Artists, 1995#)
- Unidentified contribution to Dust: Essays (1995)
- Writing, Identity, and Copyright in the Net Age (from MMLA, volume 28, number 1, Spring 1995#)
- Samuel Delaney: Orpheus (1996^^)
- On Delany the Magiian (Foreword to Trouble on Triton, 1996#)
- The Future (1997#)
- The Gift of the Disease (The Guardian, January 18, 1997)
- Bruce Willis and Me (1997^^)
- Bodies of Work: Essays (1997). Includes a preface. Any essay with symbol # indicates it is included in this collection.
- Acker: Articles from The New Statesman 1989–1991 (2007, Amandla Publishing)
- Russian Constructivism (from Blasted Allegories) (date unknown#)
- Notes on a title page of Herman Melville's White Jacket (Undated)
- Some American Cities (from Marxism Today) (date unknown#)
- Postmoderism (undated #)
- About Robert Mapplethorpe (undated^^)
- Allen Ginsberg: A Personal Portrait (undated^^)
- A Bunch of Propositions about the Hernandez Brothers (undated^^)
- On Twin Peaks (undated^^)
- Women who have Big Muscles (undated^^)
- The End of Poetry (undated^^)
- Eugenie De Franval (undated^^)
- Fabre's Work or Opera (undated^^)
- Unidentified essay, part of the Iain Sinclair inventory.

Book reviews – typescripts of sixteen different reviews from 1985 to 1989 – available at Duke University's collection of Kathy Acker papers.

=== Interviews and conversations ===
Incomplete list:

- Interview with Barry Alpert (Mitali Restaurant, pub. in Only Paper Today, March 30, 1976) Published in The Last Interview.
- "Kathy Acker by Mark Margill" (pub. in BOMB Magazine, July 1, 1983)
- Informal Interview (with R.J. Ellish, Carolyn Bird, Dawn Curwen, Ian Mancor, Val Ogden, and Charles Patrick, April 23, 1986) Published in The Last Interview.
- Kathy Acker at the ICA (Part of the Anthony Rolland Collection of Films and Art, Writers in Conversation, 1986)
- A Conversation with Kathy Acker (with Ellen G. Friedman, Gramercy Park Hotel, NYC, 1 February 1988) Pub. in Review of Contemporary Fiction 9, No. 3 (Fall 1989): 12–22.
- Conversations with Dean Kulpers (Gramercy Park Hotel Bar, NYC, July 2, 1988). Published in The Last Interview.
- Devoured by Myths: An Interview with Sylvere Lotringer (New York, Oct 1989 – May 1990, published in Hannibal Lecter My Father) The unexpurgated transcript was published in The Last Interview.
- "An interview with Kathy Acker" (with Larry McCaffery, pub. in Mississippi Review 20, Nos. 1–2 (1991): 83–97).
- The On Our Backs Interview: Kathy Acker (with Lisa Palac, May/June 1991). Published in The Last Interview.
- Kathy Acker Interviewed by Rebecca Deaton (pub. in Textual Practice 6, No. 2 (Summer 1992): 271–82.
- Body Building (with Laurence A. Rikels, pub. in Artforum, February 1994). Published in The Last Interview.
- Can't: Walk and chew gum (with Richard Kadrey, from Covert Culture series, pub. in Hotwired online, 13 September 1995)
- Kathy Acker (in conversation with Beth Jackson, pub. in eyeline, Autumn/Winter 1996). Published in The Last Interview.
- Strange Gaze interview with Anton Corbijn (1996, source unknown, available at Duke University's collection of Kathy Acker's papers)
- All Girls Together: Kathy Acker Interviews the Spice Girls (pub. The Guardian, 1997) Published in The Last Interview.
- The Last Interview (with Kesia Boddy, 1997) Published in The Last Interview.
- Candle in the Wind (interviewed by Juan Ruben Reyes, The Physics Room, Issue 3, Summer 1998)
- Kathy Acker (with Andrea Juno and V. Vale, pub. in Angry Women (RE/Search, 1991: June Books, 1999). Published in The Last Interview.
- Pussy and the Art of Motor Cycle Maintenance or how to be a pirate on-line and channel your energies so as to remember your dreams... (interviewed by Rosie X, date/magazine unknown)
- interview with Karl Schieder (July 25, 1991, The Naropa Institute, Boulder, Colorado, pub. in ilato.org, pub date unknown)
- A Conversation with Kathy Acker (interviewed by Benjamin Bratton (Speed), pub. in Apparatus and Memory, date unknown)
- Kathy Acker interviews William S. Burroughs (date unknown)

=== Correspondence ===
Incomplete list:

- Spread Wide, with writer Paul Buck. Incorporates correspondence between Kathy Acker and Buck from early 80s. Published in 2005 by Dis Voir.
- I'm Very Into You. A book of Acker's email correspondence with media theorist McKenzie Wark, edited by Matias Viegener, her executor and head of the Kathy Acker Literary Trust. Pub. in 2015, by Semiotext(e).

== See also ==
- Postmodern feminism
- Radical feminism
- Sex-radical feminism
- Punk literature
- Riot grrrl
- Post-structuralism
- New Narrative
