= Audrey Wollen =

Feminist theorist and visual artist

- Born: 1992 (age 33–34); Los Angeles, California, U.S.
- Education: California Institute of the Arts (BFA); CUNY Graduate Center
- Occupations: Writer; artist
- Parent(s): Peter Wollen; Leslie Dick

Audrey Wollen (born 1992, in Los Angeles, CA) is an American writer and artist. Wollen's prose and essays gained traction on social media platforms like Tumblr as she developed the idea of "Sad Girl Theory". Wollen has written for publications including The Nation, The New York Review of Books, and Artforum. Her work has been exhibited at the Museum of Modern Art Warsaw, the Barischer Kunstverein, and Steve Turner Gallery. She lives and works in New York.

== Early life and education ==
Wollen was born and raised in Los Angeles, California. Her mother is writer and artist Leslie Dick and her father is film theorist and filmmaker Peter Wollen.

Wollen graduated with a BFA from CalArts in 2015 and is working on a PhD at The Graduate Center, CUNY.

== Writing and art ==
Wollen has reviewed books by novelists such as Anne Carson, Kate Zambreno, and Katherine Anne Porter and has covered artists Elsie Wright and Frances Griffiths, Amalia Ulman, Richard Prince, Lana del Rey, and Alina Szapocznikow.

In 2018, Wollen and Leslie Dick organized a window installation of books, according to her biographer Jason McBride, that influenced writer and poet Kathy Acker. Books include ones she reproduced, rewrote, appropriated, and "pirated" into her own texts from her various apartments in New York, London, and San Francisco. This was in conjunction with Focus on Kathy Acker, an East Village Series at Performance Space New York.

In 2021, Wollen wrote a passage on the late artist Kaari Upson, whom Wollen worked for as a studio archivist.

== Sad Girl Theory ==
Wollen's Sad Girl Theory began as a research project that looked at the cultural trope of the suicidal woman. Sad Girl Theory articulates that the suffering woman is a political agent whose refusal to make amends with her sadness and suffering is an act of revolt. Thus, Sad Girl Theory proposes routine female sadness and bodily stress as a general state of social/political opposition. Sad Girl Theory is based on the notion that a women's sadness and its saturation on the body might be an active, autonomous, and articulate form of resistance. Sad Girl Theory can be considered an academic response to the liberal and neoliberal feminist ideal that views women as the makers of their own success.

Sad Girl Theory provided inspiration for artist and writer Johanna Hedva's Sick Woman Theory, a project focused on chronic illness as an embodied form of political protest. Hedva claims, in response to Wollen's work, that they were "mainly concerned with the question of what happens to the sad girl who is poor, queer, and/or not white when, if, she grows up."
