= Blank Generation =

Blank Generation may refer to:

- Blank Generation (album), by Richard Hell & The Voidoids, released in 1977
- Blank Generation (song), the title track to the above album
- Blank Generation (literary), literary genre
- The Blank Generation, a 1976 music documentary
- Blank Generation (1980 film), featuring Richard Hell & The Voidoids
