= Punk literature =

Literature related to the punk subculture

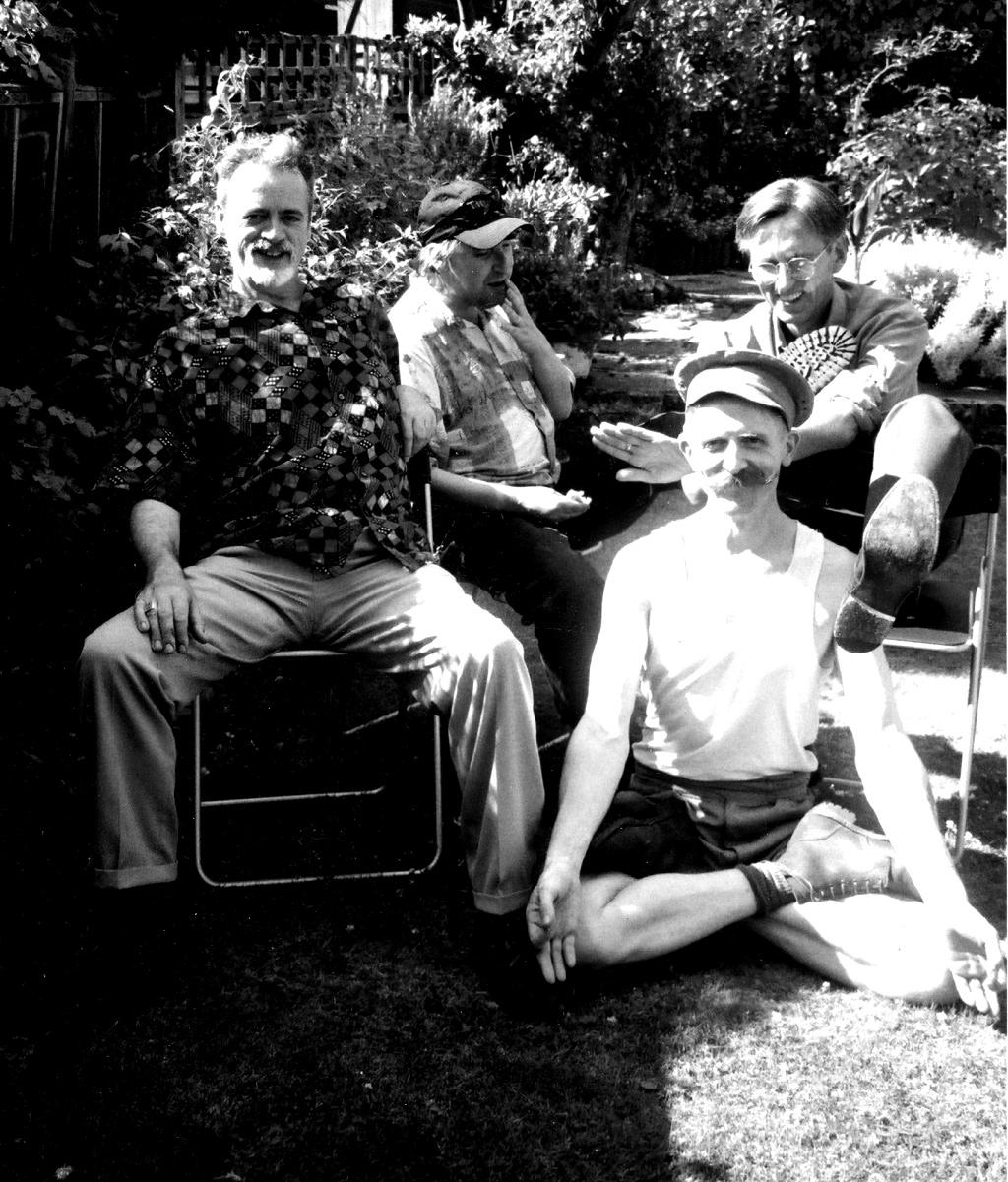
Members of The Medway Poets in 2003: Bill Lewis, Sexton Ming, Robert Earl and Billy Childish.

Punk literature (also called punk lit and, rarely, punklit) is literature related to the punk subculture. The attitude and ideologies of punk rock gave rise to distinctive characteristics in the writing it manifested. It has influenced the transgressional fiction literary genre, the cyberpunk genre and their derivatives.

== Journalism ==
The punk rock subculture has had its own underground press in the form of punk zines, which are punk-related print magazines produced independently and distributed on a small scale. Many regional punk scenes have had at least one punk zine, which features news, gossip, social commentary, music reviews and interviews with punk rock bands. Notable punk zines include Maximum RocknRoll, Punk Planet, Cometbus, Girl Germs, Kill Your Pet Puppy, J.D.s, Sniffin' Glue, Absolutely Zippo, Suburban Rebels and Punk Magazine. Notable punk journalists and magazine contributors include Mykel Board, John Holmstrom, Robert Eggplant and Aaron Cometbus.

== Poetry ==
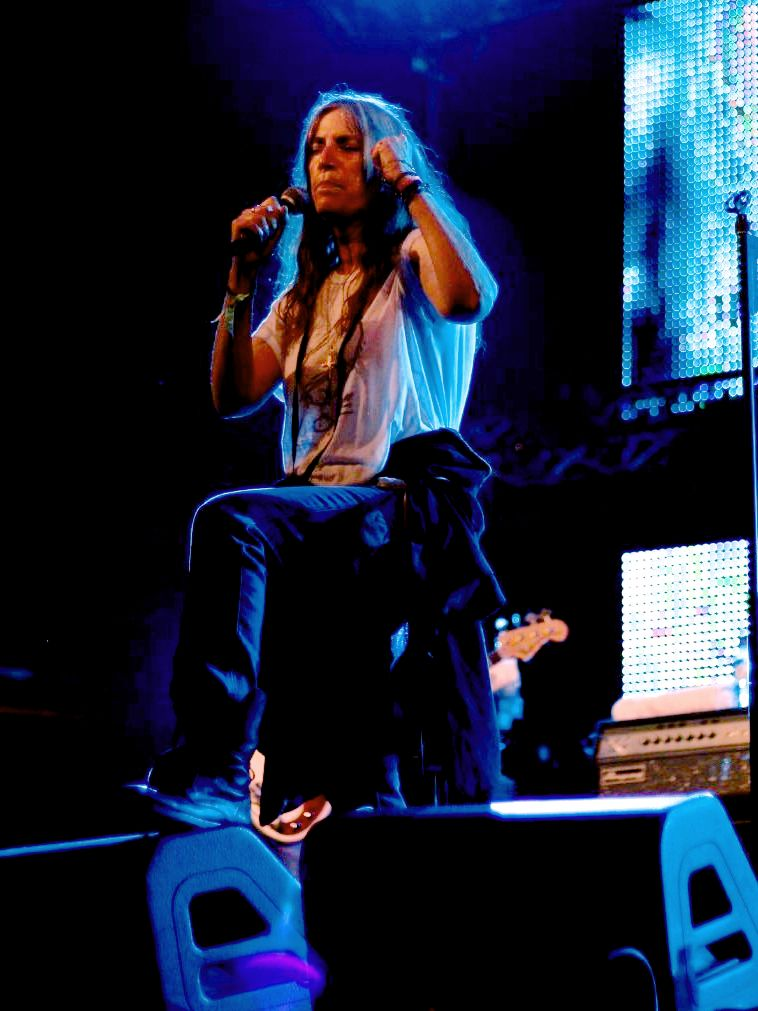
Punk poet Patti Smith performing at Primavera Sound festival, Barcelona.

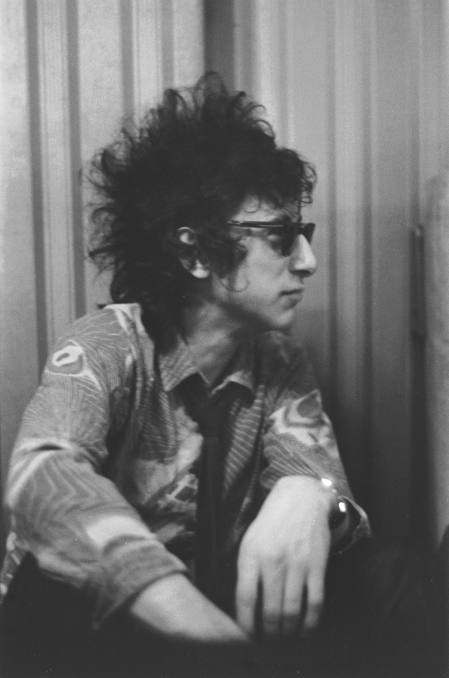
Punk poet John Cooper Clarke in 1979.

Many punk poets are also musicians, including Richard Hell, Jim Carroll, Patti Smith, John Cooper Clarke, Nick Toczek, Raegan Butcher and Attila the Stockbroker. Carroll's autobiographical works are among the first-known examples of punk literature. The Medway Poets, an English punk poetry performance group founded in 1979, included punk musician Billy Childish. They are credited with influencing Tracey Emin, who was associated with them as a teenager. Members of the Medway Poets later formed the Stuckists art group. Charles Thomson's description of a Medway Poets performance highlights its difference from a traditional poetry reading:

Bill Lewis jumped on a chair, threw his arms wide (at least once hitting his head on the ceiling) and pretended he was Jesus. Billy sprayed his poems over anyone too close to him and drank whisky excessively. Miriam told the world about her vagina. Rob and I did a joint performance posing, with little difficulty, as deranged, self-obsessed writers. Sexton finally introduced us to his girlfriend, Mildred, who turned out to be a wig on a wadge of newspaper on the end of an iron pipe.

Inspired by punk poet John Cooper Clarke and dub poet Linton Kwesi Johnson, a ranting poetry scene developed in the early 80s, which included performers such as "Seething" Wells, Joolz, Attila the Stockbroker, Porky the Poet, "Teething" Wells, Garry Johnson, The Big J, Little Brother, Swift Nick, Little Dave and Ginger John. Ranting poets often provided support at punk/new wave gigs and some went on to release their own records or appear on punk compilations.

== Fiction ==
The punk subculture has greatly influenced the cyberpunk literary genre and its various derivatives. Punk zines have spawned a considerable amount of punk-oriented fiction, some of which has made an impact outside of punk circles. Many of the major works of Kathy Acker reflect themes of punk literature, most notably Blood and Guts in High School. Daphne Gottlieb's poetic works are similar in motif. The novelist and screenwriter Diablo Cody has self-identified as "punk" in the past. Love and Rockets is a comic with a plot involving the Los Angeles punk scene. Jack O'Donnell, the protagonist in Ben MacNamara's 2004 Fire Work embodies many of the qualities of the punk ethos.

== See also ==
- Alternative comics
- Cyberpunk
- Splatterpunk
- Underground comix
