= Steven Wells =

British journalist, author, comedian and punk poet

- Born: 10 May 1960; Swindon, England
- Died: 24 June 2009 (aged 49); Philadelphia, Pennsylvania, U.S.
- Occupations: Music critic, journalist, screenwriter, poet, novelist, film producer, publisher, comedian
- Writing career
- Pen name: Seething Wells, Susan Williams, Swells
- Period: 1984–2009
- Genre: Punk lit
- Subjects: Rock music, punk culture, politics, anti-fascism

Steven Wells (10 May 1960 – 24 June 2009) was a British journalist, author, comedian and punk poet born in Swindon, Wiltshire. He was best known for ranting poetry and his provocative, unapologetic music journalism. In June 2006, he wrote in the Philadelphia Weekly about his treatment for Hodgkin's lymphoma. After being in remission for a short time, he was diagnosed with enteropathy-associated T-cell lymphoma in January 2009 and died on 24 June 2009 in Philadelphia.

== Early life and education ==
Wells was born in Swindon but moved to Bradford when young. He left school with minimal qualifications in 1977.

== Career ==
He started working in a factory and as a bus conductor. It was at this time that he became involved with punk rock, including the radical socialist Leeds art-punk band the Mekons.

In 1981, whilst living in Leeds, Wells began performing as a ranting poet and comedian under the names Seething Wells, Swells and Susan Williams. He was a support act to various northern English punk bands, such as the Fall, Delta 5 and Gang of Four, along with fellow ranting poets such as Attila The Stockbroker and Porky The Poet.

After moving to London, Wells began to write for NME, initially under the name Susan Williams. He championed socialist soul/punk band the Redskins; American hardcore punk bands such as Black Flag and the Butthole Surfers; British bands that merged thrash, hardcore and heavy metal, such as Extreme Noise Terror, Napalm Death; and certain pop artists, such as Daphne and Celeste.

Wells was also critical of some artists and individuals such as Richard Branson, and when covering his appearance in issue #160 of the British Transformers comic, mockingly called Branson "the world's richest bearded git" and Transformers a "crap comic". In the 1990s, he diversified, occasionally writing comedy (for shows such as On the Hour and The Day Today) and other non-music related journalism.

In 1992, Wells and Nick Small formed GobTV, a music video directing partnership. GobTV videos were characterised by extreme visuals, rapid edits, a political agenda and humour. GobTV made promos for the Wildhearts, Manic Street Preachers, and Skunk Anansie amongst others, and were the top UK directors in 1994 and 1995. The partnership ended in 1996. In 1999 he started the Attack! Books publishing house and his debut novel was Tits Out Teenage Terror Totty. His illustrated history Punk: The Stories Behind the Songs was published in 2004. In 2009 he contributed a story to the Love Hotel City anthology.

Wells became a sports columnist for The Guardian, FourFourTwo, 90 Minutes, The Quietus music website and the Philadelphia Weekly, and was in the process of writing several books.

Wells's favourite band of all time was the Glaswegian pop-punk trio Bis.

== Tributes ==
There were many tributes to Wells after his death. Billy Bragg wrote: "The antithesis of the bonehead racist, he was in fact an articulate left-winger and unlike the bully boy who only picks on those weaker than him, Swells chose to target the powerful, the popular, the hip and the cool."

Music journalist Everett True described Wells as "a tastemaker. He informed people's opinions, challenged them, led them, changed them…most of this by default, by sheer force of his personality and peerless ability to entertain."

Boff Whalley, of anarcho-punk band Chumbawamba wrote: "Seething (Steven) Wells died two days ago. Then tonight, starting to write this, I find out that Michael Jackson has died. One of these two men owned a ranch called Neverland and had three children called Michael Joseph Jackson Jr, Paris Michael Katherine Jackson and Prince Michael Jackson II. The other one was the King of Pop."
