= Attila the Stockbroker =

English poet and musician

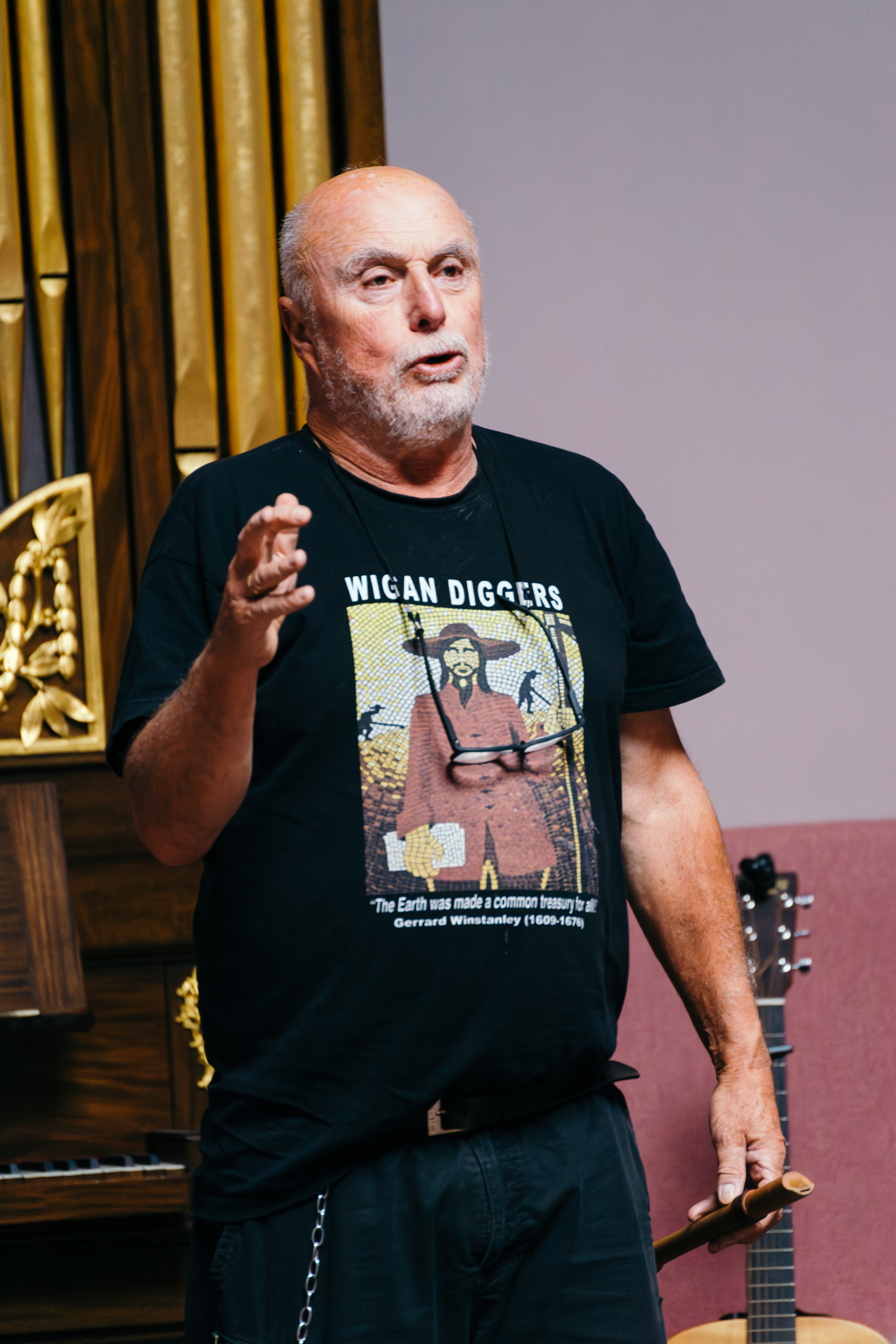
- Attila the Stockbroker performing at the 2025 Edinburgh Festival Fringe

Background information
- Born: John Baine; 21 October 1957 (age 69)
- Genres: Punk rock, punk poetry, folk punk, early music
- Occupations: Singer, songwriter, poet
- Instruments: Vocals, mandola, violin, viola, mandocello, recorder, crumhorn, rackett, cornamuse, shawm, rauschpfeife, bombard
- Years active: Late 1970s–present
- Labels: Cherry Red, Probe Plus, Roundhead Records, Zorch Productions
- Website: attilathestockbroker.com

John Baine (born 21 October 1957), better known by his stage name Attila the Stockbroker, is an English punk poet, multi instrumentalist musician and songwriter. He performs solo and as the leader of the band Barnstormer 1649, who combine early music and punk. He has performed over 4000 concerts, published ten books of poems, an autobiography (which itself has 38 poems in it) and in 2021 his Collected Works spanning 40 years. He has released over forty recordings (albums and singles). From the late 1990s through the early 2010s, Baine was heavily involved in the battle to save the English football club Brighton & Hove Albion F.C.

== Early life ==
Baine grew up in Southwick, West Sussex, 5 miles west of Brighton, the port town of Shoreham Harbour. His maternal family roots there go back at least 200 years. Inspired by his father, an amateur poet who died when Baine was ten, he started writing poems and songs at primary school, did his eleven-plus a year early and won a West Sussex County Council scholarship to elite Royal charter Private School Christ's Hospital. In his autobiography he describes how much he hated it, going there just after his father died. Baine attended the University of Kent, Darwin College, in Canterbury between 1975 and 1978 graduating with a 2:2 degree in French and Politics. Baine took the performing name Attila the Stockbroker during a short stint as a City stockbroker's clerk between 1980 and 1981, because a colleague accused him of having the eating habits of Attila the Hun.

== Career ==
Having started performing in the late 1970s after being inspired by the spirit and 'do it yourself' ethos of the punk subculture, particularly The Clash's overtly socialist stance, Baine was briefly a bass player in punk rock bands English Disease and Brighton Riot Squad, and spent some time in 1979 in Brussels playing bass in Belgian band Contingent before going solo. He did his first gig as Attila the Stockbroker at Bush Fair Playbarn, Harlow, Essex, on 8 September 1980. At first he performed poems and songs in between bands at punk rock concerts, accompanying himself on the phased electric mandolin. After this was smashed over his head by fascists during a fight at a performance in North London in May 1982, he got a mandola (a fifth lower) and has played this ever since. He refers to his mandola as "Nelson", in tribute to Nelson Mandela. He has performed in 26 countries, playing venues ranging from the Oxford Union in England to squatted punk clubs in Germany, and performs between 80 and 100 shows every year, sometimes more. He has done 4 tours of Australia, 3 of New Zealand, 6 of Canada, 4 of the US, and hundreds of gigs in mainland Europe. He toured East Germany four times before the Berlin Wall came down, performed in a hotel in Enver Hoxha's Albania and had to turn down the opportunity to perform in North Korea (at the World Festival of Youth & Students in 1989) because he was already booked to tour Canada. He was signed by Cherry Red in 1982 after recording a session for John Peel's BBC Radio 1 show. He recorded a second session for Peel in 1983.

In the 1980s, he was often the support act for punk bands, including The Jam, The Alarm, Newtown Neurotics, New Model Army, and performed extensively with fellow punk-inspired ranting poets, Swift Nick (Nick Swift), Kool Knotes (Richard Edwards), Porky the Poet (Phill Jupitus) and Seething Wells (Steven Wells). Manic Street Preachers supported him at a performance at Swansea University. In the 1990s, alongside many other things, he toured with John Otway as Headbutts and Halibuts, and together they wrote a surreal rock opera called Cheryl, a tale of Satanism, trainspotting, drug abuse and unrequited love. He performed on the Cabaret Stage at every Glastonbury Festival from 1983 until 2016 and at the Edinburgh Festival Fringe from 1982 to 1991, returning in 2015 to join the PBH Free Fringe with whom he has performed from then to now. In 2025 he is still as prolific as ever, writing topical, satirical material on all kinds of subjects. In 1996 Attila founded the annual Glastonwick beer and music festival, originally held in his home town of Southwick, West Sussex, before later moving to Coombes Farm near Shoreham-by-Sea. The 30th and final Glastonwick took place in 2025.

Notable works from the 1980s include the poem "Contributory Negligence"; various Russian-themed poems, satirising the alleged Cold War Russian threat in the context of Margaret Thatcher's Britain (such as "Russians in the DHSS" and "Russians in McDonald's"). Other political poems include the surreal Nigel series, such as "Nigel wants to go to C&A". Later pieces include "Asylum Seeking Daleks", which satirises the right wing press's attitudes to immigration, and "Hey Celebrity", which rejects the need for the concept of celebrity.

Attila the Stockbroker formed the band Barnstormer in 1994, with the initial aim of combining punk rock and early music, which they did to an extent on their debut album, The Siege of Shoreham, in 1996. Then Barnstormer's lineup changed: they turned into a melodic punk band and for the next 22 years performed regularly across Europe, doing over 500 gigs and releasing three further albums, Just One Life (2000), Zero Tolerance (2004), and Bankers and Looters (2012). In 2018, Attila, who has always been interested in the history of the radical movements spawned in the aftermath of the English Civil War, wrote and recorded an album, Restoration Tragedy on that theme, combining early music and punk. He changed the name of the band to Barnstormer 1649 (the year of King Charles I of England's execution and the revolutionary uprisings by the Levellers and Diggers).

Barnstormer 1649 features Attila on vocals, mandola, violin, viola, crumhorn, cornemuse, shawm, bombard, rauschpfeife and recorder; Sean Cox on guitar/backing vocals; M. M. McGhee on drums and Dave Cook (also of Too Many Crooks) on bass/backing vocals. He also performed an acoustic Early Music Show highlighting the same material, most notably at St Cecilia's Hall in Edinburgh as part of their Festival series.

Attila is still doing many solo shows combining his poems and songs. He has released three CDs featuring live recordings of solo gigs: Live in Belfast (2003) Live in Norway (2007), and Live at the Greys (2014). His book of poems, Undaunted, was published in 2017; UK Gin Dependence Party and Other Peculiarities in January 2014; and My Poetic Licence came out in 2008. In 2010, he published a pamphlet, The Long Goodbye, containing two poems – a long one dedicated to, and chronicling the life of his mother, Muriel, who died in June 2010, after a six-year battle with Alzheimer's disease, and a shorter one written for his stepfather, John Stanford, who died in December 2009. The Long Goodbye was featured on BBC Radio 4's Woman's Hour on Mother's Day in 2011. Attila celebrated 30 years of performing in September 2010, with a 27-date tour of the UK, Germany and the Netherlands. In March 2011, he toured Australia and New Zealand for the first time in ten years. In 2012, he made a return to Albania and, in February 2014, toured the UK, Germany and Switzerland to promote his latest poetry book. In 2018, he performed at the Limerick Limerick Festival and continues to tour mainland Europe.

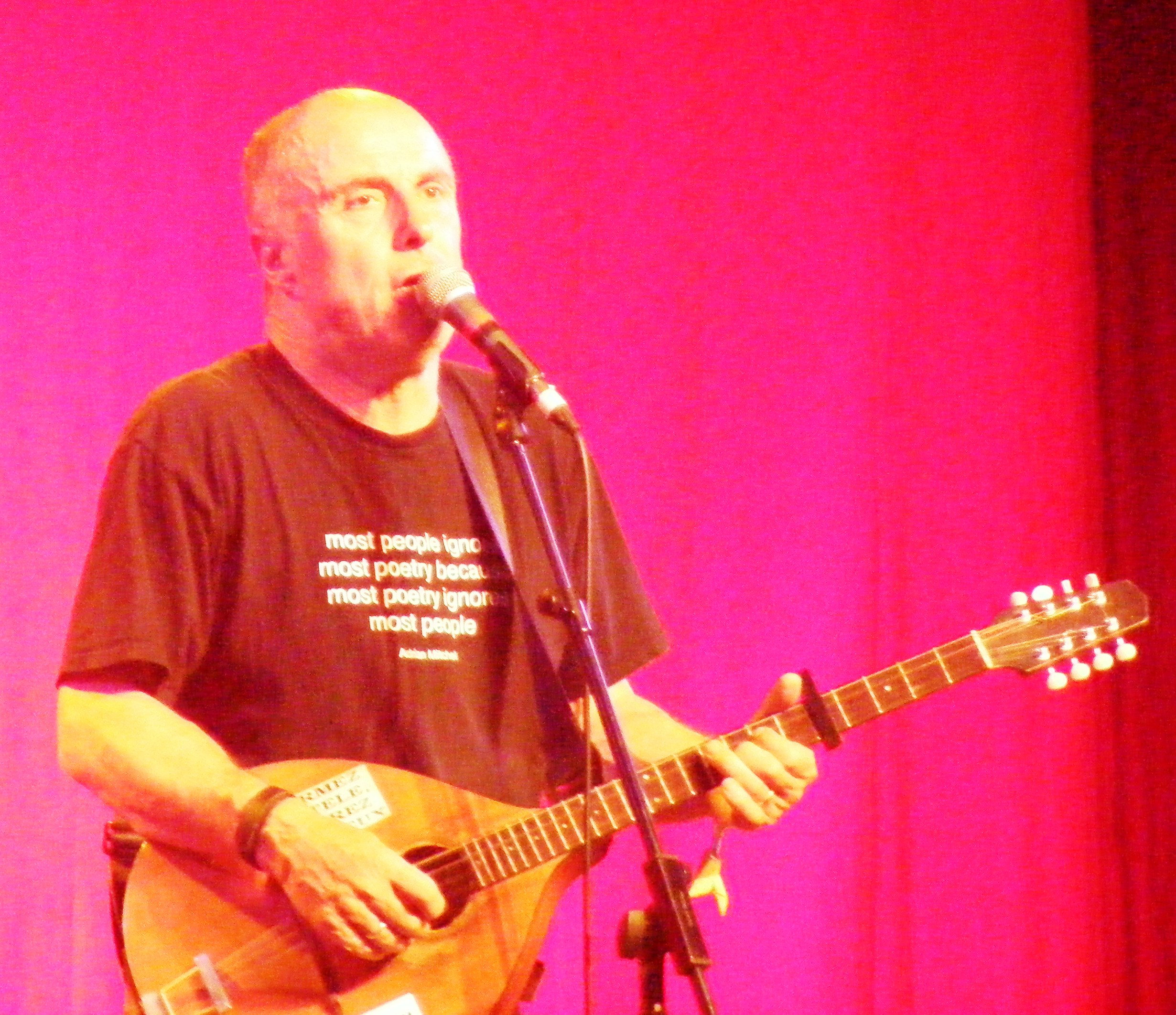
Attila the Stockbroker in 2010

8 September 2015, the 35th anniversary of his first gig, saw the publication of his autobiography, Arguments Yard (35 Years of Ranting Verse and Thrash Mandola) by Cherry Red Books ( part of Cherry Red).

In September 2016, Attila performed at the Keep Corbyn rally in Brighton in support of Jeremy Corbyn's campaign in the Labour Party leadership election.

In 2017, a short documentary, 35 Years A Punk Poet, about Attila's performance career, was produced by film maker Farouq Suleiman.

In April 2021, delayed from 2020 by the pandemic, Cherry Red Books released Heart on My Sleeve (Collected Works 1980–2020), an anthology of his life's work. June 2021 saw the release of a Dub poetry EP Dub Ranting, a collaboration with reggae producers What's Left Dub, Kingsley Salmon and Rebel Control. His latest album 40 Years in Rhyme, a dub poetry collection with the same collaborators, was released by Zorch Productions in June 2022.

His football poetry anthology, A Lifetime of Football Writing (Poems, Songs & Stories), was published in a joint project with fans of Tampere United in Finland: it was launched at a match there in July 2025.

His latest book Fiery Words For Hellish Times was published by Flapjack in March 2026.

== Football support ==
Baine is a supporter of Brighton & Hove Albion F.C. and, for about 16 years, was heavily involved in the successful battle to save the club and secure a new stadium, after the Goldstone Ground was sold to property developers in 1997. The Seagulls finally moved to their new stadium at Falmer in August 2011. He has been the team's poet in residence since 2000, and was the stadium announcer and DJ for 14 years, first at Gillingham, where the club spent two seasons playing 'home' games, and then at the club's temporary home at Withdean Stadium. As the main member of the one-off band, Seagulls Ska, he had a single reach No. 17 in the UK Singles Chart in 2005, as part of the campaign for the new stadium. "Tom Hark (We Want Falmer)".

On 17 August 2016, just before the start of Brighton's debut in the Premier League, he appeared in a Guardian documentary, From Nowhere to the Premier League, about the fans' role in the club's survival and resurgence. On 12 August his poem on that theme, From Hereford To Here, was broadcast by BT Sport before the coverage of their first game against Manchester City. In 1989, he appeared on the Kickback segment of The Channel Four Daily, reflecting on Liverpool's 9–0 win over Crystal Palace.

== Collections ==
The University of Kent holds an archive of material relating to Baine's career which forms part of the British Stand-Up Comedy Archive. The collection includes press coverage, publicity material, fanzines and zines, and his manifesto for election as the University of Kent's Student President.

== Bibliography ==
=== Poetry collections ===
- Cautionary tales for Dead Commuters (with Seething Wells), Allen & Unwin, 1986
- Scornflakes, Bloodaxe, 1992
- The Rat-Tailed Maggot & Other Poems, Roundhead, 1998
- Goldstone Ghosts, Roundhead, 2001
- My Poetic Licence, Roundhead, 2008
- The Long Goodbye (poems for my mother and stepfather), Roundhead, 2010
- UK Gin Dependence Party and Other Peculiarities, Roundhead, 2014
- Undaunted, Roundhead, 2017
- Heart on My Sleeve (Collected Works 1980–2020), Cherry Red Books, 2021
- A Lifetime of Football Poetry (Poems, Songs & Stories), Hiljainen oy, Finland, 2025
- Fiery Words For Hellish Times, Flapjack, 2026

=== Autobiography ===
- Arguments Yard (35 years of Ranting Verse and Thrash Mandola), Cherry Red Books, 2015

== Discography ==
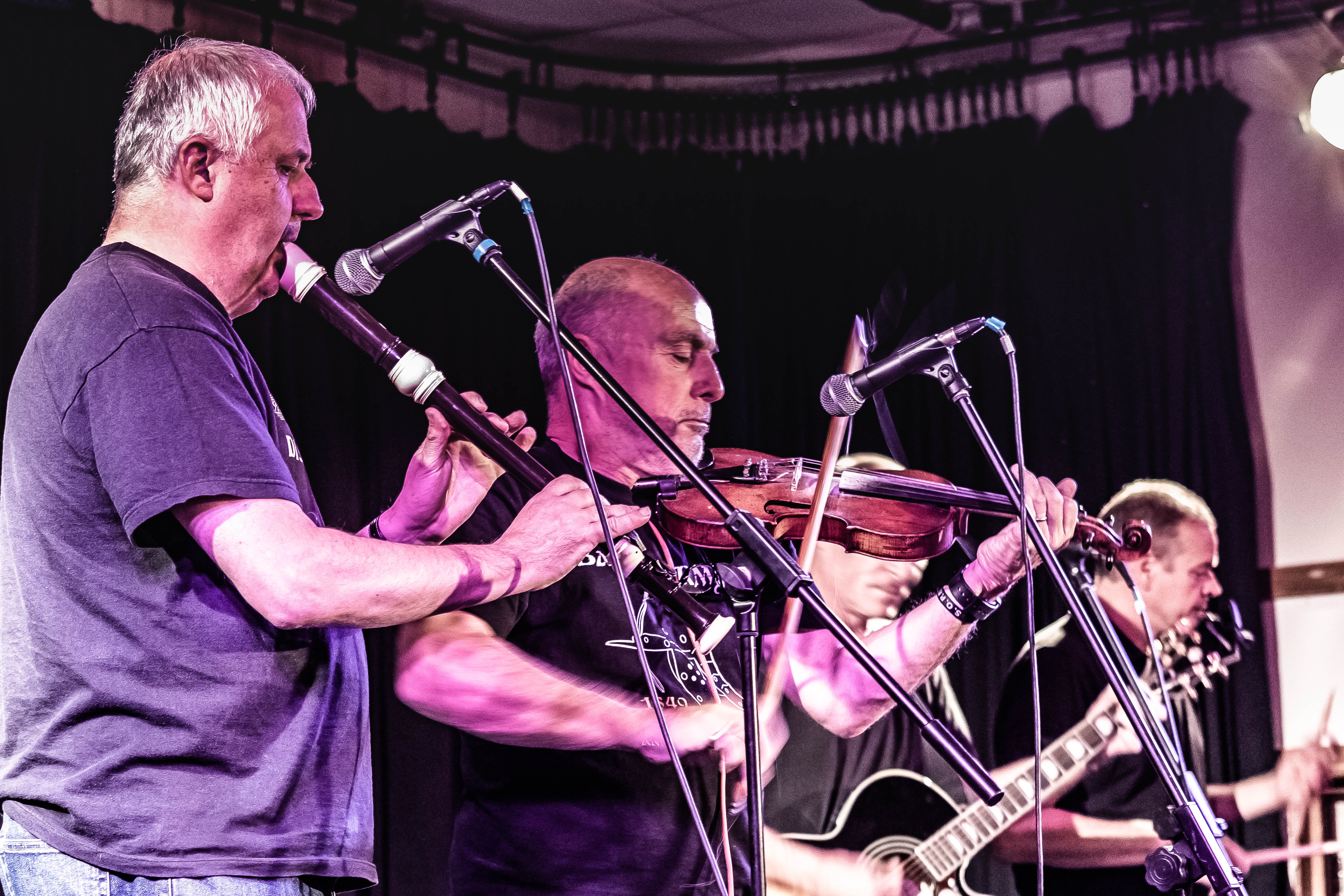
Attila the Stockbroker (centre, playing violin) performing with Barnstormer 1649 at Calstock Hall. September 2018

=== Solo ===
- 1981 Phasing Out Capitalism cassette (No Wonder)
- 1982 Rough, Raw and Ranting EP with Seething Wells (Radical Wallpaper)
- 1982 Cocktails EP (Cherry Red)
- 1983 Ranting at the Nation LP (Cherry Red) (UK Indie No. 12)
- 1984 Sawdust and Empire LP (Anagram)
- 1984 Radio Rap! EP (Cherry Red)
- 1984 Livingstone Rap! EP (Cherry Red Ken)
- 1987 Libyan Students from Hell! LP (Plastic Head)
- 1988 Scornflakes LP/cassette (Probe Plus)
- 1990 (Canada) Live at the Rivoli LP/cassette (Festival)
- 1991 Donkey's Years CD/LP/cassette (Musidisc)
- 1991 Cheryl – a Rock Opera (Strikeback) – with John Otway
- 1992 (Germany) This Is Free Europe CD/LP (Terz)
- 1993 (Australia) 668-Neighbour of the Beast CD/cassette (Larrikin)
- 1993 (Germany) Live auf St.Pauli CD (Terz)
- 1993 Attila the Stockbroker's Greatest Hits cassette (Roundhead)
- 1999 Poems Ancient & Modern CD (Roundhead/Mad Butcher)
- 1999 The Pen & The Sword CD (Roundhead/Mad Butcher)
- 2003 Live in Belfast (Roundhead)
- 2005 Tom Hark (We Want Falmer) EP – with Seagulls Ska (Skint)
- 2007 Live in Norway (Crispin Glover)
- 2008 Spirit of the Age (Roundhead)
- 2010 Disestablished 1980 (Mad Butcher)
- 2012 "The Long Goodbye"/"Never Too Late" (Roundhead)
- 2015 Live at the Greys (Mad Butcher)
- 2020 Heart on My Sleeve, A Fortieth Anniversary Song Compilation – Attila The Stockbroker and Barnstormer (Hiljaiset Levyt)
- 2021 Dub Ranting (Digital release via Bandcamp and 12 inch EP on Zorch Records))
- 2022 40 Years in Rhyme (Zorch Productions)

=== Barnstormer ===
- 1995 Barnstormer cassette (Roundhead Records)
- 1995 (Germany) Sarajevo EP (Mad Butcher)
- 1996 The Siege of Shoreham CD/cass (Roundhead Records)
- 1998 Live in Hamburg cassette (Roundhead Records)
- 1999 (Germany) The Siege of Shoreham CD (Puffotter Platten) and LP (East Side Records)
- 2000 Just One Life (Roundhead Records)
- 2004 Zero Tolerance (Roundhead Records)
- 2004 Baghdad Ska – split single with Bomb Factory (Repeat Records)
- 2012 Bankers & Looters CD (Mad Butcher) LP (Hupseeln Records)

=== Barnstormer 1649 ===
- 2018 Restoration Tragedy double LP and CD (Roundhead Records)
