= Peter Wollen =

English film theorist and filmmaker (1938–2019)

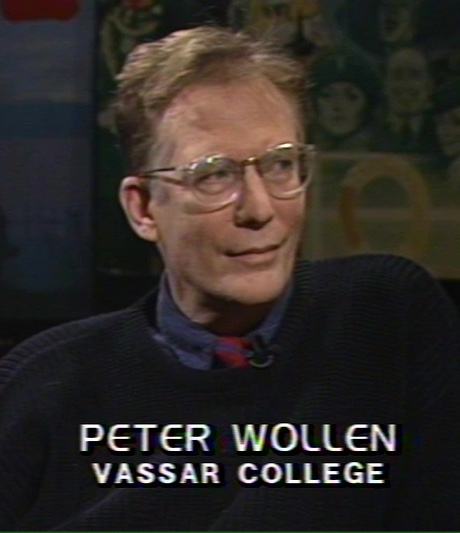
- Wollen on CUNY TV's Cinema Then, Cinema Now (1991)
- Born: 29 June 1938; London, England
- Died: 17 December 2019 (aged 81); Haslemere, Surrey, England
- Other name: Lee Russell
- Spouses: Laura Mulvey (m. 1968; div. 1993) Leslie Dick (m. 1993–2019)

Academic background
- Education: Christ Church, Oxford

Academic work
- Discipline: Film studies, media studies
- Institutions: Brown University; New York University; Northwestern University; University of California, Los Angeles
- Notable works: Signs and Meaning in the Cinema

Peter Wollen (29 June 1938 – 17 December 2019) was an English film theorist and filmmaker. He studied English at Christ Church, Oxford. Both a political journalist and film theorist, Wollen's Signs and Meaning in the Cinema (1969) helped to transform the discipline of film studies by incorporating the methodology of structuralism and semiotics. He taught film at a number of universities and was Professor Emeritus at the University of California, Los Angeles at the time of his retirement from academe in 2005.

== Life ==
Wollen was born on 29 June 1938, in Woodford, northeast London, to Douglas and Winifred (Waterman) Wollen. Douglas was a Methodist minister and Winifred was a teacher. Peter attended a Methodist boarding school, Kingswood School, in Bath, Somerset, England.

In 1959, Wollen graduated from the University of Oxford with a degree in English literature.

In 1968, Wollen married noted film theorist and his partner in filmmaking, Laura Mulvey. They divorced in 1993 and soon afterward he wed writer and artist, Leslie Dick. He had a son from his first marriage and a daughter, Audrey Wollen, from his second.

Wollen died of Alzheimer's disease on 17 December 2019, from which he had suffered for many years.

== Academic career ==
By the mid-1960s, Wollen was writing for journals such as the New Left Review under the pseudonym of Lee Russell. Through a bit of self-reflexivity, Wollen interviewed himself as Lee Russell in 1997.

Wollen joined the British Film Institute's education department in the late 1960s, at the behest of its director, Paddy Whannel, who had been impressed by his work. Wollen explained, "One of the basic goals of the education department was to support anyone who wanted to teach film in schools or universities. And one way to support them was by publishing books which they could use in class." Subsequently, the BFI created a series of film books titled, "Cinema One," and Signs and Meaning in the Cinema was the ninth book released under that banner.

Signs and Meaning in the Cinema's initial publication in 1969 was followed by a revised edition, with a new appendix, just three years later. It quickly gained traction in the burgeoning film-studies world of the 1970s. In 1976, Robin Wood contended, "Peter Wollen's Signs and Meaning in the Cinema is probably the most influential book on film in English of the past decade." And the book has continued to wield influence decades later—having been released in a fifth, "silver" edition in 2013. In a Sight & Sound poll in 2010, Signs and Meaning repeatedly cropped up—leading critic Nick Roddick to exclaim, "If there is one book to rule them all, it is Peter Wollen's Signs and Meaning in the Cinema. The revised and enlarged edition of 1972 is the most concise, lucid and inspiring introduction to thinking about film ever written."

== Filmography ==
Wollen's first film credit was as cowriter of Michelangelo Antonioni's The Passenger in 1975. He made his debut as a director with Penthesilea: Queen of the Amazons (1974), the first of six films cowritten and co-directed with his wife, Laura Mulvey. The low-budget Penthesilea portrayed women's language and mythology as silenced by patriarchal structures. Acknowledging the influence of Jean-Luc Godard's Le Gai savoir (France, 1969), Wollen intended the film to fuse avant-garde and radically political elements. The resulting work is innovative in the context of British cinema history, although its relentlessly didactic approach did not make for mass appeal.

For Riddles of the Sphinx (1977), Wollen and Mulvey obtained a BFI Production Board grant, which enabled them to work with greater technical resources, rewriting the Oedipal myth from a female standpoint.

The deliberately ahistorical AMY! (1980), commemorating Amy Johnson's solo flight from Britain to Australia, synthesises themes previously covered by Wollen and Mulvey. In Crystal Gazing (1982) formal experimentation is muted and narrative concerns emphasised. Frida Kahlo and Tina Modotti (1982), a short film tied to an international art exhibition curated by Wollen, and The Bad Sister (1982), a drama based on a novel by Emma Tennant, were the final projects on which Wollen and Mulvey collaborated.

Wollen's only solo feature, Friendship's Death (1987), starring Bill Paterson and Tilda Swinton, is the story of the relationship between a British war correspondent and a female extraterrestrial robot on a peace mission to Earth, who, missing her intended destination of MIT, inadvertently lands in Amman, Jordan during the events of Black September 1970.

== In popular culture ==
The Sydney University Film Group and WEA Film Study Group used Wollen's Signs and Meaning in the Cinema for the basis of a season of film screenings talks and discussions on the ideas in the book in September and October 1969.

== Bibliography ==
- Raiding the Icebox: Reflections on Twentieth-Century Culture, by Peter Wollen. New Edition, Verso Books, 2008
- Electronic Shadows: The Art of Tina Keane, by Peter Wollen, Jean Fisher, and Richard Dyer. Black Dog Publishing, 2005.
- Paris / Manhattan: Writings on Art, by Peter Wollen. Verso Books, 2004.
- "Edward Hopper", by Peter Wollen, Sheena Wagstaff, David Anfam, Brian O'Doherty & Margaret Iversen. Tate Publishing, 2004.
- Autopia: Cars and Culture, Edited by Peter Wollen and Joe Kerr. Reaktion Books, 2003.
- Paris Hollywood: Writings on Film, by Peter Wollen. Verso Books, 2002.
- "Victor Burgin", by Peter Wollen & Francette Pacteau. Fundacio Antoni Tàpies, 2001
- "Subject Plural: Crowds in Contemporary Art" by Peter Wollen, Marti Mayo & Paola Morsiani. Contemporary Arts Museum, 2001
- Making Time: Considering Time as a Material in Contemporary Video and Film, by Amy Cappellazzo, Peter Wollen, and Adriano Pedrosa. Distributed Art Publishers, 2000.
- Addressing the Century: 100 Years of Art and Fashion, by Peter Wollen. University of California Press, 1999.
- Visual Display: Culture Beyond Appearances, Edited by Lynne Cooke and Peter Wollen. The New Press, 1999.
- Who is Andy Warhol? by Colin MacCabe, Mark Francis, and Peter Wollen. British Film Institute, 1998.
- Scene of the Crime, edited by Ralph Rugoff, by Anthony Vidler, and Peter Wollen. MIT Press 1997.
- Signs and Meaning in the Cinema, by Peter Wollen, expanded and revised edition. London: British Film Institute, 1998.
- Howard Hawks, American Artist, edited by Peter Wollen & Jim Hillier. British Film Institute, 1996
- Raiding the Icebox: Reflections on Twentieth-Century Culture, by Peter Wollen. Indiana University Press, 1993
- Singin' in the Rain, by Peter Wollen. British Film Institute 1993.
- "Black and White: Dress from the 1920s to Today" by Peter Wollen, Claudia Gould, Anne Hollander, Lucy R Sibley, Kathryn A Jakes & Sophie Anargyros. Wexner Center for the Arts, 1992.
- "On the Passage of a Few People Through a Rather Brief Moment in Time: The Situationist International 1957–1972", by Peter Wollen. MIT Press, 1989
- "Addressing The Century", by Peter Wollen. Hayward Gallery, 1998.
- Wollen, Peter (March–April 1989). "The Situationist International". New Left Review. I (174). New Left Review: 67–95.
- "Komar and Melamid", by Peter Wollen & Mark Francis. The Fruitmarket Gallery, 1985.
- "Frida Kahlo and Tina Modotti", by Peter Wollen & Laura Mulvey. Whitechapel Gallery, 1982
- "Chris Welsby: Films, Photographs, Writings", edited by Peter Wollen. Arts Council of Great Britain, 1981
- Signs and Meaning in the Cinema, by Peter Wollen. London: Secker and Warburg, 1969–1972. Fifth edition released in 2013.
- "Working papers on the cinema: sociology and semiology", edited by Peter Wollen. BFI Education Dept. 1969
- Samuel Fuller, edited by David Will & Peter Wollen, Edinburgh, 1969
- "Orson Welles – Study Unit No. 9", edited by Peter Wollen. BFI Education Dept. 1969

== Interviews ==
- Field, Simon, "Two Weeks on Another Planet", Monthly Film Bulletin 646, 1987, pp. 324–6
- Friedman, Lester D., "Interview with Peter Wollen and Laura Mulvey on Riddles of the Sphinx", Millennium Film Journal 4/5, 1979, pp. 14–32
- Mulvey, Laura and Wollen, Peter, "Written Discussion", After Image, July 1976, pp. 31–9
