= Douglas A. Martin =

American writer (born 1973)

- Born: September 29, 1973 (age 53)
- Education: University of Georgia (BA); The New School (MFA); CUNY Graduate Center (PhD)
- Occupations: Poet; novelist; short story writer
- Website: www.douglasamartin.net

Douglas A. Martin (born September 29, 1973) is an American poet, novelist, and short story writer.

== Biography ==
He was raised in Warner Robins, Georgia, and moved to New York City in 1998. Beginning as a performance poet and dramatist, Martin then shifted to the novel form and has concentrated creative energies here since his first full-length prose work, Outline of My Lover.

Martin holds a BA from the University of Georgia, an MFA from The New School, and a Ph.D. in English from the CUNY Graduate Center. His doctoral dissertation, which dealt with the work of post-modern writer Kathy Acker, was awarded The Irving Howe Prize for Best Dissertation Involving Politics and Literature in 2007. He teaches at Wesleyan University.

== Work ==
Outline of My Lover was selected as an International Book of the Year in The Times Literary Supplement by Colm Toibin and adapted in part by The Forsythe Company, along with "Irony Is Not Enough: Essay On My Life As Catherine Deneuve (2nd draft)" by Anne Carson, for the multimedia production "Kammer/Kammer".

Martin's work since Outline of My Lover includes Branwell, a novel based on the life of Branwell Brontë, and They Change The Subject, a collection of stories. The Haiku Year was co-authored with Michael Stipe, Tom Gilroy, Jim McKay, Grant Lee Phillips, and others. A volume of poetry, In the Time of Assignments was published by Soft Skull Press in 2008. This work was followed by an experimental narrative, Your Body Figured (Nightboat books), which deals with aspects of the lives of the artists Balthus, Francis Bacon and his muse and model George Dyer, and the poet Hart Crane. In 2009, Martin published a third novel, Once You Go Back, with Seven Stories Press. A semi-autobiographical novel, Once You Go Back describes growing up in a strained working-class household transplanted to the South, and was a Finalist for the Lambda Literary Award in 2010.

Acker (2017), a book-length essay, was reviewed widely and favorably.

== Selected bibliography ==
- Outline of My Lover (Soft Skull Press, 2000)
  - 彼はぼくの恋人だった (単行本 – 2007/8)
  - Una Traccia del Mio Amore (Indiana, 2012. Prefazione di Marco Mancassola )
  - Esbozo de mi amante (Sexto Piso, 2022)
- They Change the Subject (University of Wisconsin Press, 2005)
- Branwell (Soft Skull Press, 2005)
- In The Time of Assignments (Soft Skull Press, 2008)
- Your Body Figured (Nightboat Books, 2008)
  - Seu Corpo Figurado (A Bolha Editora, 2011)
- Once You Go Back (Seven Stories Press, 2009)
- Acker (Nightboat Books, 2017)
- Kathy Acker: The Last Interview and Other Conversations (Melville House, 2019; co-editor)
- Wolf (Nightboat Books, 2020)

== Miscellanea ==
- Martin was the subject of an early film by director Lance Bangs, Evil Queernieval Vs. Ga. Square Mall.
- Martin played a part in director Michael Robinson's 2012 film, Circle in the Sand.
