= Paddy Whannel =

British academic (1922–1980)

- Born: Atholl Douglas Whannel; 17 October 1922; Pitlochry, Scotland
- Died: 8 July 1980 (aged 57); London, England
- Occupations: professor, author
- Employer(s): British Film Institute, Northwestern University
- Children: 1

Atholl Douglas (Paddy) Whannel (17 October 1922 – 8 July 1980) was a key figure in the educational work of the British Film Institute (BFI) throughout the 1960s. He officially joined the faculty at Northwestern University, Evanston, Illinois in 1972 and taught there until his death in 1980.

== Personal life ==
Whannel was born in Pitlochry, Scotland. When he was 14, he left school and took a job as a film projectionist. During World War II, he served in the Royal Navy on aircraft carriers. In the post-War years, he attended Alnwick College of Education, Northumberland, and, from 1948, taught art in Surrey schools.

His son, Garry Whannel is also a media-studies scholar, the author of Media Sport Stars, Masculinities and Moralities.

Whannel died rather suddenly 8 July 1980 while spending the summer in England.

== Career ==
Whannel was hired by the BFI in 1957, having taught history, art, social studies and mass media at various London schools for nine years. His first task as Education Officer was to lecture about film up and down the country; his teaching became an inspiration for a whole generation of film educators. In 1964, he co-authored The Popular Arts with Stuart Hall, in which he showed his interest in popular (particularly Hollywood) film as a serious subject of study, at a time when this kind of cinema was still neglected by traditional British film criticism (including the BFI's own Sight and Sound).

Although Whannel hardly ever published about film again, it was under his leadership that the BFI Education Department adopted a new, dynamic policy towards film criticism and film studies that provided a platform for emergent film theory. As Alan Lovell put it, "a grasp of the overall context and an attention to detail combined with democratic inclinations enabled him to create a framework that released other people’s energies and talents while making sure they were used to their best effect". In the mid-1960s Whannel brought into the Department a new generation of film teachers, theorists and writers, including Alan Lovell, Jim Kitses, Peter Wollen and Victor Perkins, who played a prominent role in shaping the development of film studies and film theory (in particular semiotics and structuralism) in Britain. But the intellectual challenge provided by this new current of thought made Whannel a controversial figure within the BFI. In August 1971, he and five of his colleagues from the Education Department resigned after a Sub-Committee of the BFI Governors had delivered a report which proposed "scaling down the Department’s activity, reducing it to a support and advisory role, and cutting the umbilical cord that linked it to the Society for Education in Film and Television, then publisher of Screen."

Whannel had occasionally taught at Northwestern University and, after his departure from the BFI, he became an associate professor in its Radio-TV-Film Department—eventually becoming the head of that department.
