= Pierre Guyotat =

French writer (1940–2020)

Pierre Guyotat (French: [pjɛʁ ɡɥijɔta]; 9 January 1940 – 7 February 2020) was a French literary avant-garde writer who wrote fiction, non-fiction, and plays. He is best known for his 1967 novel Tombeau pour cinq cent mille soldats (Tomb for 500,000 Soldiers), about his experiences in the Algerian War, and his 1970 novel Eden, Eden, Eden, which was banned for its explicit content. Many of his novels are set in imaginary north African war zones. Idiotie (Idiocy, 2018) won the Prix Medicis.

== Early life and education ==
Pierre Guyotat was born on 9 January 1940 in Bourg-Argental, a small town in a mountainous area near Lyon. His father was a doctor, who aided local partisans during the occupation of France by the Nazis in World War II.

Guyotat attended Catholic schools. He wanted to become a painter as a child, and admired Picasso and Matisse, who were still alive then. He also wrote poetry and some prose when he was a school-aged teenager.

== Career ==
Many of Guyotat's novels are set in imaginary north African war zones.

=== 1960s–1970s ===
Guyotat wrote his first novel, Sur un cheval, after fleeing to Paris after the death of his mother in 1958.

He was called to Algeria in 1960 to fight in the Algerian War. He had sympathy for the Algerians and encouraged the Algerian conscripts to desert. In 1962 he was charged with complicity in desertion, damaging the morale of the army, and was held incommunicado in an underground prison for three months without trial, then transferred to a disciplinary unit. Back in Paris, he got involved in journalism, writing first for France Observateur, then for Nouvel Observateur. In 1964, Guyotat published his second novel, Ashby.

Between 1964 and 1975, Guyotat travelled extensively in the Sahara. In July 1967, he was invited to Cuba, along with other writers, where he travelled to the Sierra Maestra with Fidel Castro.

In 1967, he published Tombeau pour cinq cent mille soldats (later released in English as Tomb for 500,000 Soldiers). Based on his ordeal as a soldier in the Algerian War, the book earned a cult reputation and became the subject of various controversies, mostly because of its omnipresent sexual obsessions and homoeroticism.

In 1968, Guyotat became a member of the French Communist Party, which he left in 1971.

Eden, Eden, Eden was published in 1970, with a preface by Michel Leiris, Roland Barthes, and Philippe Sollers. (Note: Michel Foucault's text was received late and therefore did not appear.) This book was banned from being publicised or sold to minors. A petition of international support was signed by Pier Paolo Pasolini, Jean-Paul Sartre, Pierre Boulez, Joseph Beuys, Pierre Dac, Jean Genet, Simone de Beauvoir, Joseph Kessel, Maurice Blanchot, Max Ernst, Italo Calvino, Jacques Monod, and Nathalie Sarraute. François Mitterrand and Georges Pompidou tried to get the ban lifted but failed. Claude Simon (who won the Nobel Prize in 1985) resigned from the jury of the Prix Médicis after the prize wasn't awarded to Eden, Eden, Eden, missing out by a single vote. According to American critic Ron Slate, "Drawing from his Algerian experiences, the text comprises one continuous sentence (scored with backslashes, brackets, semicolons and commas), an intoned catalog of military atrocities, communal humiliations, unsated lust, and miscellanea running 192 pages".

In 1973, Guyotat's play Bond en avant ("Leap Forward") was performed. During the 1970s he was involved in various protests: for soldiers, immigrants, and prostitutes. One of those cases was of great importance for him: he personally helped Mohamed Laïd Moussa, a 24-year-old Algerian ex-teacher who was accused and then found guilty of unintentional murder in Marseille. One week after he came out of jail, Moussa was murdered by a masked man; this event had a profound impact on Guyotat.

In 1975 his novel Prostitution came out (which incorporated Bond en avant as the final monologue). From this point on, his novels deal with new argot and obscenity. They still explore the possibility of worlds structured by sexual slavery and transgression of fundamental taboos, but the French language is distorted, and ellipses of letters or words, neologisms, and phonetic transcriptions of Arabic utterances make it difficult to understand.

In 1977, while working on Le Livre (1984) and Histoire de Samora Machel (unpublished), he suffered a psychiatric illness. In December 1981, he was admitted to an intensive care unit in a coma, after neglecting his body for months.

=== 1980s ===
Following the election of François Mitterrand, France's first socialist president, in 1981, the ban on Eden, Eden, Eden was lifted.

From 1984 to 1986, Guyotat gave a series of readings and performances of his work all over Europe.

In 1988 he lived in Los Angeles for a while to co-author the book, Wanted Female, with the painter Sam Francis.

=== 2000s ===
In January 2000 he was involved in the reopening of the Centre Georges Pompidou at Beaubourg in Paris, contributing a reading of the first pages of Progénitures. The book was published later that year (Gallimard).

In 2005, Sur un cheval was re-edited and in April 2005 it was read on Radio France. The Carnets de bord (vol. 1, 1962–1969) was published the same year, as well as Pierre Guyotat's first biography by Catherine Brun, Pierre Guyotat, essai biographique.

Between 2005 and 2010, Guyotat wrote and published three autobiographical books: Coma (2006), Formation (2007) and Arrière-fond (2010).

In 2011, he wrote Independence, about his experience of the war, published for the centenary of the Nouvelle Revue Française. The classes he gave at the University of Paris 8 between 2001 and 2004 were published in 2011 under the title Leçons sur la langue française (éd. Léo Scheer).

Coma was published in an English translation by Noura Wedell in July 2010.

In 2014 he published Joyeux animaux de la misère (Gallimard). An excerpt of the book was read at the IRCAM by actor and director Stanislas Nordey, who brought the text to the stage in 2014. The second part of the book, Par la main dans les Enfers, Joyeux animaux de la misère II, was published in the October 2016.

== Recognition ==
Guyotat was awarded the Prix de la langue française in 2010.

In 2018, Guyotat's Idiotie (Idiocy) won the Prix Medicis. In the same year, he was awarded the Prix Femina spécial for the entirety of his work.

In September 2020, an international project entitled Eden Eden Eden at 50 was organised by scholar, writer and museum executive Donatien Grau. The event, celebrating the 50th anniversary of Guyotat's book, comprised 50 readings around the world, by a diverse group of creatives, including artists Paul McCarthy and Kaari Upson; writer Chris Kraus; and rapper Abd al Malik. It also included a new film by Australian filmmaker Amiel Courtin-Wilson; a performance by artist Michael Dean; a reading by Philippe Parreno in Berlin; and a concert by Scott McCulloch in Tbilisi.

Many of his works have been performed on stage.

== Death and legacy ==
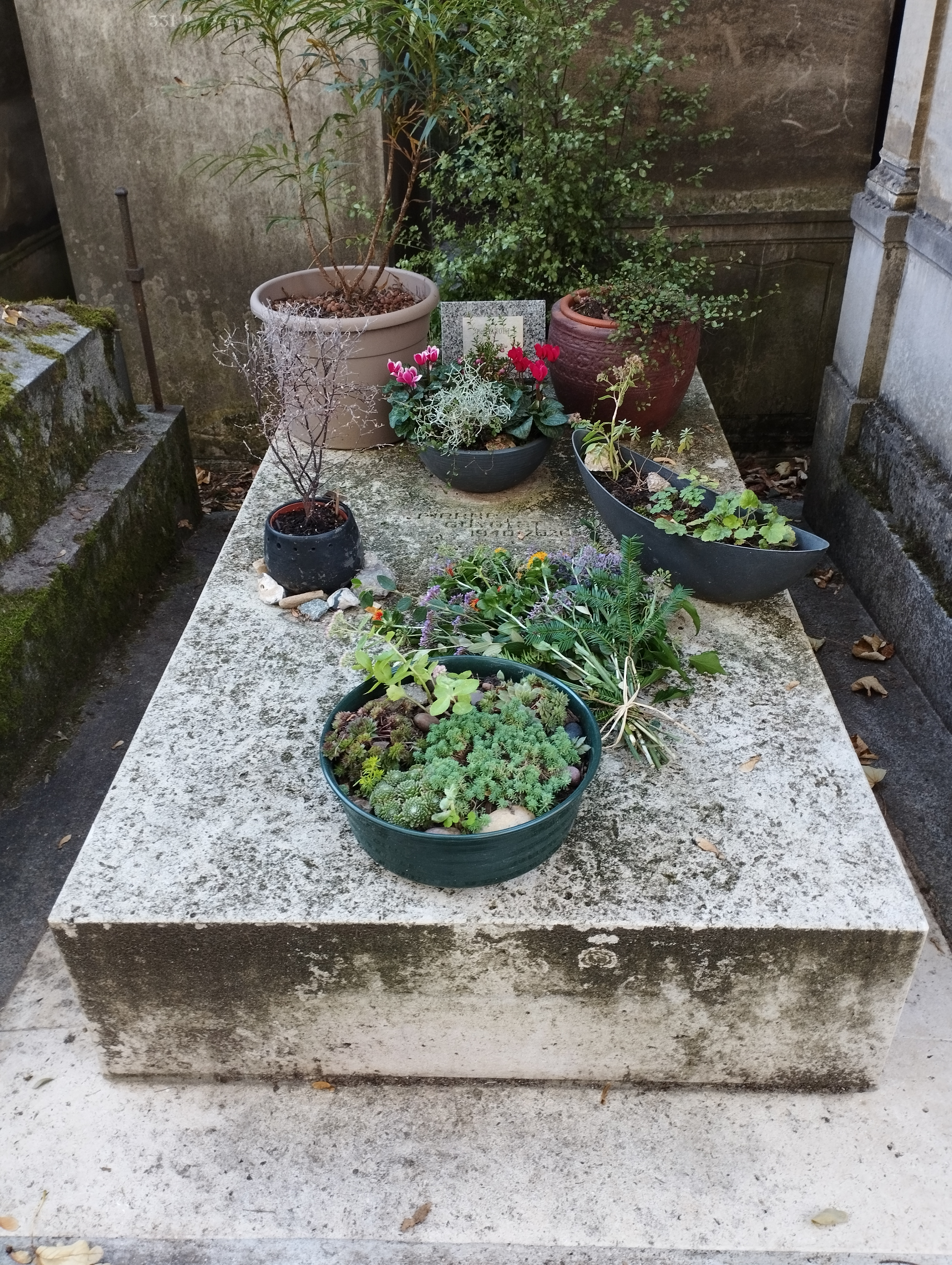
Guyotat's grave at the Père-Lachaise Cemetery in Paris

In 2004, Guyotat donated his manuscripts to the Bibliothèque nationale de France (French National Library).

He died on 7 February 2020.

== Bibliography ==
=== Fiction ===
- 1961 Sur un cheval (Seuil, Paris).
- 1964 Ashby (Seuil, Paris).
- 1967 Tombeau pour cinq cent mille soldats (Gallimard, Paris).
- 1970 Eden, Eden, Eden (Gallimard, Paris).
- 1975 Prostitution (Gallimard, Paris).
- 1984 Le Livre (Gallimard, Paris).
- 1995 Wanted Female, with Sam Francis (Lapis Press, Los Angeles).
- 2000 Progénitures (Gallimard, Paris).
- 2014 Joyeux animaux de la misère (Gallimard, Paris).
- 2016 Par la main dans les enfers: Joyeux animaux de la misère II (Gallimard, Paris)

=== Non-fiction ===
- 1972 Littérature interdite (Gallimard, Paris).
- 1984 Vivre (Denoël, Paris).
- 2000 Explications (Léo Scheer, Paris).
- 2005 Carnets de bord, volume 1 1962-1969 (Ligne-Manifeste).
- 2006 Coma (Mercure de France, Paris).
- 2007 Formation (Gallimard, Paris).
- 2010 Arrière-fond (Gallimard, Paris).
- 2011 Leçons Sur la Langue Française (Léo Scheer, Paris).
- 2013 Pierre Guyotat : les grands entretiens d'Artpress (IMEC/Artpress, Paris).
- 2018 Idiotie (Grasset et Fasquelle, Paris).

=== Theatre ===
- 1972 Bond en avant, produced by Marcel Bozonnet and Alain Ollivier
- 1987 Bivouac, produced by Alain Ollivier
- 2005 Sur un cheval, with Valérie Crunchant and Mireille Perrier. Reading directed by Alain Ollivier for France Culture

=== English translations ===
- "Eden, Eden, Eden" transl. by Graham Fox, reworked and revised, (London, Vauxhall & Company, 2017, series editors Paul Buck & Catherine Petit)
- "Body of the Text," transl. by Catherine Duncan, published in Polysexuality (Los Angeles, Semiotext(e), 1981).
- Eden, Eden, Eden, transl. by Graham Fox (London, Creation Books, 1995).
- Prostitution: An Excerpt, transl. by Bruce Benderson (New York, Red Dust, 1995).
- Tomb for 500,000 soldiers, transl. by Romain Slocombe (London, Creation Books, 2003).
- "Art is what remains of History," transl. by Paul Buck and Catherine Petit, published in Frozen Tears II (Birmingham, ARTicle Press, 2004).
- Coma, transl. by Noura Wedell (Los Angeles, Semiotext(e), 2010).
- Independence, transl. by Noura Wedell (Los Angeles, Semiotext(e), 2011).
- In the deep, transl. by Noura Wedell (Los Angeles, Semiotext(e), 2014).
- Idiocy. Translated by Peter Behrman de Sinety. New York: New York Review of Books. 28 October 2025. ISBN 978-1-68137-920-3.
