= Blank Generation (literary) =

Blank Generation fiction is a term applied to a range of American punk or transgressive fiction writers of the 1970s and 1980s, first applied by Elizabeth Young and Graham Caveney in their 1992 study Shopping in Space: Essays on American 'Blank Generation' Fiction (Serpent's Tail, UK/US). The name stems from Richard Hell's signature Blank Generation album and title track (itself a riff on and dismissive of the Beat Generation)

At its broadest, the authors considered American Brat Pack writers such as Bret Easton Ellis, Jay McInerney and Tama Janowitz as belonging to the milieu, as well as Gary Indiana and A. M. Homes. However, the term (which the authors agreed to be problematic) is most accurately applied to the New York writers Kathy Acker, Bruce Benderson, Dennis Cooper, Joel Rose and Hell himself, all of whom featured in the magazine Between C & D. This directly influenced the writing on publications such as Rebel Inc.

The milieu was discussed in-depth in Brandon Stosuy's Up Is Up, But So Is Down: New York's Downtown Literary Scene, 1974–1992 (NYU Press) in 2006.
