= Eden, Eden, Eden =

1970 novel by Pierre Guyotat

Eden, Eden, Eden (French: Éden, Éden, Éden, 1970) is a 1970 novel by Pierre Guyotat.

== Synopsis ==
The story is set in the Algerian desert during the Algerian War of Independence. It centers around the relationships, both friendly and conflicting, in a women's brothel for soldiers that adjoins a boys' brothel for workers. Visitors may move from one brothel to another without restriction. On the fringes of the brothels, the customers' wives, fiancées, and sisters keep watch and lament the sterility of these free frolics. The novel ends at the end of the day, at the end of the brothel.

The book has a preface written by Michel Leiris, Roland Barthes and Philippe Sollers.

== Banning ==
It was banned by the Minister of the Interior from display, advertising and sale to minors. An international petition in support of the work was signed, by numerous authors including Pier Paolo Pasolini, Jean-Paul Sartre, Pierre Boulez, Joseph Beuys, Pierre Dac, Jean Genet, Joseph Kessel, Jacques Derrida, Maurice Blanchot, Max Ernst, Italo Calvino, Jacques Monod, Simone de Beauvoir, and Nathalie Sarraute. François Mitterrand, in a speech to the National Assembly, and then President of the Republic Georges Pompidou in a letter to his Minister of the Interior Raymond Marcellin advocate in favor of the book, but the ban was not lifted until November 1981.

The Prix Médicis's jury chose another book by one vote so Claude Simon, a member of the jury and a proponent of Pierre Guyotat's work, resigned.

== Editions ==
=== Translations ===
==== English ====
- Eden, Eden, Eden, Engl. transl. by Graham Fox (London, Creation Books, 1995, 2003, 2005, 2009)
- Eden, Eden, Eden, Engl. transl. by Graham Fox, reworked and revised, (London, Vauxhall & Company, 2017)

==== Dutch ====
- Eden, Eden, Eden, Dutch transl. by Jan Rijnsburger (Utrecht: Uitgeverij, 2002)

==== German ====
- Eden, Eden, Eden, German transl. by Holger Fock, (Zurich: Diaphanes, 2015

==== Spanish ====
- Edén, Edén, Edén, Spanish transl. by Margarita Villaseñor, 1979 (2nd ed. 1982)
- Edén, Edén, Edén, Spanish transl. by Michel Leiris (Madrid: Malas Tierras, 2020)

==== Japanese ====
- エデン・エデン・エデン / エデン・エデン・エデン ("Eden, Eden, Eden") Japanese transl. by Kozo Sakakibara (Japan: Peyotl Koubou, 1970)
