= Blood and Guts in High School =

Book by Kathy Acker

- Author: Kathy Acker
- Genre: Experimental fiction
- Publisher: Grove Press, Picador, Penguin Classics
- Publication date: 1984
- Media type: Print (hardcover, paperback)
- Pages: 165 pp (paperback)
- ISBN: 0-8021-3193-X (paperback edition)
- OCLC: 21433552

Blood and Guts in High School is a novel by Kathy Acker. It was written in the 1970s and copyrighted in 1978, first being published in 1984. It remains Acker's most popular and best-selling book. The novel is a metafictional text, aware of its status as a fictional piece.

== Plot ==
The book's heavily surreal and frequently disrupted narrative tells the story of Janey Smith, a ten-year-old American girl living in Mérida, Mexico, with her father, with whom she has an incestuous sexual relationship. Her father begins to spend all his time with another woman, Sally, leading Janey to realize that he hates her because he sees her as an obstacle to freedom. Janey's father agrees to let her move to the US by herself and puts her into a school in New York City. For a period of time he sends her money, but she later works in a hippie bakery, a job she despises. She has many sexual partners and gets two abortions. She joins a gang called The Scorpions, who eventually crash a stolen car while being chased by police. The only survivors are Janey and Monkey, a fellow gang member. Afterwards, Janey begins to live in a slum in the East Village. One day, two thieves break into her apartment, kidnap her, and sell her into prostitution. She becomes the property of a Persian slave trader who imprisons her, trying to turn her out as a prostitute.

Shortly before the slave trader plans to release Janey to work for him, he discovers that she has cancer. He lets her go and she illegally goes to Tangier, Morocco. There she meets Jean Genet, the iconic French writer, with whom she vulgarly and intensely discusses her previous sexual relationship with US President Jimmy Carter. Janey and Genet develop a relationship, traveling through North Africa together and stopping in Alexandria. Genet treats Janey badly and thinks little of her, eventually deciding to leave her. Janey gets arrested for stealing Genet's property, and shortly afterwards he joins her in prison. A rebellion breaks out, and a group of figures collectively named the Capitalists meet to discuss how their society is collapsing. As the revolt peaks, Janey and Genet are thrown out of Alexandria. After they travel across North Africa for some time, Genet gives Janey some money and leaves to see a production of one of his plays. Soon after they part, she dies suddenly. The book's final two sections are written from the perspective of an unnamed character who steals a book from the tomb of the poet Catullus.

== Background and publication ==
Acker wrote the book sporadically over a period of five years while living in Solana Beach, California with composer Peter Gordon. The opening section, describing the separation of Janey and her father, was written after Acker's own separation from Gordon following their brief marriage. The "dream maps" included in the book were taken from unpublished work on her first serial novel, The Childlike Life of the Black Tarantula.

After several publishing contracts fell through, the book was finally published in January 1984 by Picador, and separately by Grove Press the same year. During initial publication, both imprints accidentally reversed the intended order of the final two sections; this was corrected in Grove's 2017 anniversary edition. Another edition was published by Penguin Modern Classics in 2017 on the 20th anniversary of Acker's death.

== Literary techniques and interpretations ==
The book is written as a collage novel, variously incorporating letters, poems, drama scenes, dream visions and drawings. It appropriates text from Acker's earlier chapbook "Hello, I'm Erica Jong", addressed passive-aggressively and vulgarly towards novelist and feminist satirist Erica Jong, as well as from works by other authors, including Nathaniel Hawthorne's The Scarlet Letter and Jean Genet's The Screens.

In the section of the book titled "The Persian Poems", Acker deliberately mistranslates poems written in Persian into a parallel English text. This has been interpreted as showing how Janey, while seeking to escape her physical imprisonment, ends up reproducing the systems that dominate her.

== Reception and legacy ==
In a review written shortly after its publication, Roy Hoffman criticized the book for uncritically depicting the abuse of women.

The book was initially banned in West Germany and South Africa.

The book is featured in Peter Boxall's 1001 Books You Must Read Before You Die.

Laura Parnes adapted the novel into a multiscreen video art piece in 2007.
