= Leslie Dick =

American artist and writer (born 1954)

- Born: 1954 (age 71–72); Boston, Massachusetts, U.S.
- Education: University of Sussex
- Occupations: Artist and writer
- Employer: California Institute of the Arts

Leslie Dick (born 1954) is an American artist, writer, editor, and educator, based in Los Angeles. Her work explores feminist themes, especially in relation to queer theory and Lacanian discourse. Dick has published two novels, a collection of short stories, and several critical essays. She is a member of the editorial board of X-TRA Contemporary Art Quarterly, a Los Angeles–based, internationally distributed journal of art. She has been on the faculty at the California Institute of the Arts (CalArts) since 1992, and is currently co-director of the CalArts Program in Art. Since 2012, she has also held a position as a critic in the sculpture program at the Yale School of Art.

== Early life and education ==
Leslie Dick was born in Boston, Massachusetts, in 1954. At the age of 10, she moved from New York to London, living there from 1965 to 1988. She attended the University of Sussex and earned a BA degree in English Literature in 1977.

== Work ==
=== Fiction ===
Dick is the author of two novels: Without Falling (1987) and Kicking (1992). Without Falling has been described by Kathy Acker as "a real woman's romantic novel... written for the sake of truth" and by Angela McRobbie as "an important book" that occupies a space "along the line between romance and sexuality". Kicking, Dick's second novel, follows a self-referential love triangle set in the 1980s art world in London and New York. She has also published a collection of short stories, titled The Skull of Charlotte Corday and Other Stories (1997), which features stories with female protagonists. Her story "Envy", part of Alison Fell's 1989 seven-author project The Seven Deadly Sins, was described by Carolyn Cooke in The Nation as one of the strongest stories in the collection, using "thoroughness to transcend the trite".

=== Art criticism ===
Dick contributes regularly to X-Tra Arts Quarterly, among other journals. She contributed a chapter to a 2006 collection of criticism on Kathy Acker, titled Lust for Life.

- "On Repetition: Nobody Passes", X-Tra Arts Quarterly, Fall 2014
- "John Baldessari: Cut to the Chase", East of Borneo, 2010

=== Collaborations with Martin Kersels ===
In 1999, Dick and Los Angeles–based artist Martin Kersels were jointly selected "to run the arts program at" CalArts. Dick and Kersels have also collaborated on several projects. In 2008, Dick and Kersels exhibited the video Ripcord at ACME Gallery in Los Angeles. For the 2010 Whitney Biennial, Dick presented a talk titled The Mirror Stage—a Multimedia Performance, as part of the performance series Live on 5 Songs, curated by Kersels.

== Sarah Thornton ==
Leslie Dick appears in Sarah Thornton's collection of art world reportage, titled Seven Days in the Art World. Dick discusses her teaching philosophy in the context of a chapter on Michael Asher's "Post-Studio" critique class.
