= Lyon Antifa Fest =

- Genre: Mainly punk and rap
- Dates: Two consecutive evenings (usually between September and December)
- Locations: Lyon — Villeurbanne, France
- Years active: 2013—present
- Organizer: Culture de Classe; Groupe antifasciste Lyon et environs (GALE)
- Website: www.instagram.com/lyonantifafest/

The Lyon Antifa Fest (or LAF) is an annual anti-fascist music festival held in Lyon, France, since 2013. It brings together artists from both the rap and punk scenes, serving as a meeting point for anti-fascists and anarchists in the Rhône region.

Founded in response to the killing of Clément Méric, the festival, organized by local associations and anarchist groups, has grown steadily in terms of audience and attendance. Over the years, it has hosted numerous artists, including Médine, Casey, Sinik, Da Uzi, L'Allemand, and Scred Connexion on the rap side, and Les Ramoneurs de menhirs, René Binamé, Ausgang, Klasse Kriminale, and The Valkyrians on the punk side.

In the first half of the 2020s, the festival became a target of significant repression by French authorities. Subsidies for the venue where it performs were cut by Laurent Wauquiez, a decision later overturned, and the anarchist group co-organizing the event was banned by Gérald Darmanin before being reinstated by the courts, leading to the cancellation of the 2022 edition. In 2025, the festival was banned by the Prefect of the Rhône, Fabienne Buccio, though her decision was also struck down by the French judiciary. The festival's ties to the Palestinian cause have also been cited as a reason for these ban attempts.

== History ==
=== Situation of the anti-fascist movement in Lyon at the beginnings of the 21st century ===
Lyon's history was first shaped by the anarchist movement, seen through the city's initial period of anarchist press (1882–1884) and the assassination of Sadi Carnot in 1894. During the second half of the 20th century, it became a significant stronghold for the right and far-right. Finally, the antifascist movement gradually developed there. The number of antifascists in Lyon grew until the city became one of the primary centers of antifascism in France, with its local groups sometimes being the largest in the country. In Lyon, these circles are predominantly anarchist, with a minority of Marxist-Leninists.

=== Lyon Antifa Fest ===
==== Early editions (2013–2019) ====
In this context, the Lyon Antifa Fest was founded in 2013. It was created as a response to the killing of Clément Méric and the arrest of twenty-five activists detained following clashes with the 'Nationalist Youths' of Alexandre Gabriac and L'Œuvre Française. Over time, it earned the nickname "LAF" based on its acronym. The festival's organization is led by the association Culture de Classe and the Groupe antifasciste Lyon et environs ('Antifa group of Lyon and its surroundings') (GALE), an anarchist group central to Lyon's antifascist circles. The festival describes itself as:

an event dedicated to the struggle against discrimination and power dynamics based on social, ethnic, cultural, or religious origin, as well as sex/gender and sexual orientation.

In its inaugural year, the Lyon Antifa Fest featured Los Tres Puntos, Heyoka, Brixton Cats, Sang Mêlé, Première Ligne, Stage Bottles, and The Offenders. According to the organizers, this first initiative was a success, allowing them to cover the legal fees of their incarcerated companions.

However, the following year's second edition, featuring Singe des Rues, J’aurais voulu..., Hors Contrôle, 65 Mines Street, La Jonction, Klasse Kriminale, The Valkyrians, and RedSka, did not meet the same level of success, casting doubt on the event's future.

The third edition took place in 2015 and introduced a two-night format that would later become a staple: the first night dedicated to rap (featuring artists like Casey, Scred Connexion, and Original Tonio) and the second to punk (represented by Black Bomb A, Burning Heads, and Foxy Ladies). This third edition was reportedly successful enough to ensure the project's financial stability. That same year, the organizers also held a metal concert in support of refugees, headlined by Napalm Death, Benighted, and Whores Nation.

The Lyon Antifa Fest maintained this two-night split the following year, featuring acts such as 8°6 Crew, Angelic Upstarts, Les Barneurs, Demi Portion, La Caution, and Camelia Pand’or.

In 2019, the venue scheduled to host the festival was the target of an arson attempt by the far-right.

==== Increased audience and repression (2021–2026) ====
In 2021, a controversy forced the Lyon Antifa Fest to relocate after the publication of a video featuring the group Lax & Original Tonio. In the footage, the audience is heard chanting the lyrics: 'All cops are bastards'. Although the video was filmed six years earlier in 2015, the President of the Auvergne-Rhône-Alpes region, Laurent Wauquiez, responded by cutting annual subsidies to the venue hosting the event, a move organizers called disproportionate.

The following year, the group GALE was banned by Interior Minister Gérald Darmanin, and the Lyon Antifa Fest did not take place. In a press release, organizers announced that despite their plans to feature Les Ramoneurs de Menhirs, René Binamé, Ausgang, and IRA Rap, the event was coming to an end. The French authorities cited GALE's role in organizing the festival as one of the justifications for the group's dissolution. However, the Conseil d’État later overturned the Minister's decision to dissolve GALE, ruling that the group's support for the Yellow vests did not make them legally responsible for the damages or violence committed by the movement itself.

By 2023, in what journalist Pierre Lemerle described as an 'electric' atmosphere, the LAF reformed to celebrate its tenth anniversary. This edition featured the festival's most high-profile headliner to date, Médine, alongside Demi Portion, KLM, Kaynix, and Sidi Wacho. This festival opposed the Gaza genocide, launched by Israel the previous month in the Gaza Strip.

For its eleventh edition, the festival's punk night featured Krav Boca, Les Ramoneurs de Menhirs, and Les Garçons Bouchers, while the rap lineup included Sinik, Okis, Davodka, and Scred Connexion.

In 2025, the festival was targeted by far-right politician Tiffany Joncour, who criticized the event for 'openly claiming to be antifascist' and called for its ban. This request was echoed by the Prefect of the Rhône, Fabienne Buccio, who argued that the participation of Palestinian activist Salah Hamouri was sufficient grounds for a ban. The prohibition order was issued just one day before the event was scheduled to begin, and eight days after French authorities were sanctioned for cutting the venue's subsidies in 2021. However, the order was subsequently overturned by the courts. In the synthesis made of its own ruling, the court stated:

The judge pointed out that the Lyon Antifa Fest has been held since 2013 with no specific incidents reported in past years. He stated that the prefect has not proven that the 2025 edition would likely be any different for the concerts being discussed.
