= Fred Perry (clothing label) =

Japanese owned British fashion company

- Traded as: Private
- Industry: Clothing; Accessories
- Founded: 1952; 74 years ago
- Founder: Fred Perry
- Headquarters: London, United Kingdom
- Number of locations: 200+ stores (2024)
- Key people: John Flynn (Chairman)
- Products: Mod, casual clothing
- Revenue: ▲£154.1 million (2024)
- Operating income: ▲£18.4 million (2024)
- Net income: ▲£14.3 million (2024)
- Owners: Hit Union Co (1995-)
- Number of employees: 370
- Website: www.fredperry.com

Fred Perry is a British sporting and fashion brand of clothing and accessories, founded by legendary British tennis player Fred Perry in 1952. Although founded as, and intended to be a brand of sporting clothes, the Fred Perry brand gained mass popularity as a casual wear in the 60s due to association with alternative UK culture, notably the mods. The brand's logo is a laurel wreath, which usually appears on the left breast of Fred Perry garments, stitched into the fabric. Fred Perry products are sold and worn around the world. The Fred Perry brand is considered iconic, and remains popular and fashionable. The brand has become a global symbol of alternative culture.

== History ==
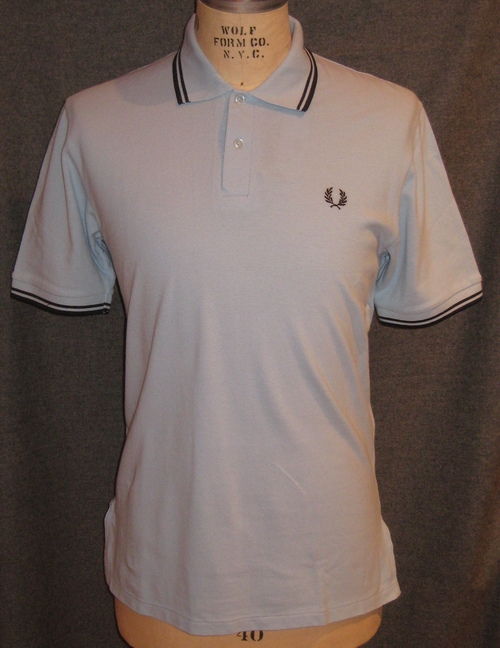
The classic Fred Perry design

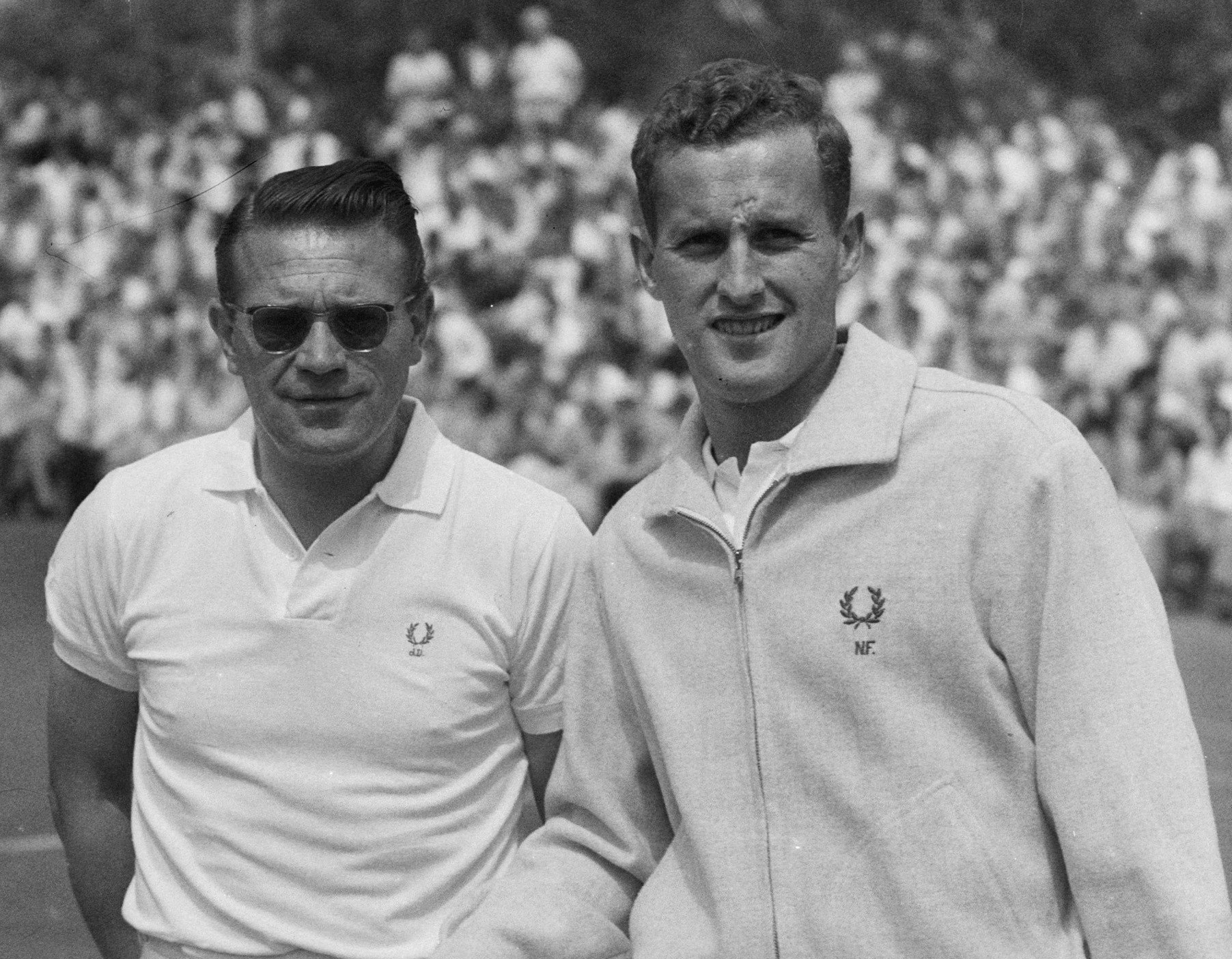
Jaroslav Drobný and Neale Fraser wearing Fred Perry

In the late 1940s, with his illustrious playing career entering its twilight, British tennis player Fred Perry was approached by, and then collaborated with Tibor (Tibby) Wegner, a former Austrian international footballer, and a fine tennis player himself, to create the first sweatband. The sweatbands were produced in Leicester, and branded as Fred Perry Sportswear. The sweatbands enjoyed considerable success, helped by Wegner and Perry's strategy of giving them for free to top players and persuading them to wear them at tournaments. Inspired by this success, Wegner and Perry, following on from the creation of a sporting clothes brand by French tennis player René Lacoste, decided to found their own sporting clothes brand, called simply Fred Perry. The brand was officially founded in 1952.

Perry, an avid pipe smoker, initially wanted a pipe for the logo, however Wegner persuaded him to reconsider, and they settled on the wreath logo, the Roman symbol of victory. However, this was also the logo of the All England Club and Davis Cup team, so permission would be required to use it. Despite Perry's fractious relationship with the All England Club, Wegner and Perry were given permission to use the laurel wreath logo. Launched at Wimbledon in 1952, the Fred Perry tennis shirt, made from white knitted cotton pique with short sleeves and a buttoned placket, and initially only available in two colours – white and black – was an immediate success, and other items of sportwear were soon added. The new sporting brand received further exposure when it was worn by prominent tennis players of the time Jaroslav Drobný and Neale Fraser.

Although the Fred Perry brand was founded as a brand of sporting clothes, it went on to be associated with various UK alternative cultures, subcultures and movements. Fans of the brand are sometimes referred to as 'Perryheads'. In the 60s, Fred Perry was significantly associated with the mod movement when, along with Ben Sherman and Lonsdale, it was adopted as the brand of choice by mods. The brand also attracted attention when it was worn by James Bond in the 1965 film Thunderball. The brand remained popular in the 70s, and early 80s, with skinheads and mod revivalism, with The Jam frontman Paul Weller often wearing Fred Perry polos. The later 80s saw the Fred Perry brand become associated with the National Front, and move into the margins. In the mid-1990s, the popularity of the Fred Perry brand in the United Kingdom was revived when it was adopted by the band Blur.

Blur, sick of the popularity of Grunge and the Americanisation of British youth culture, called for a return to all things British made, and this manifesto was delivered while wearing Fred Perry.

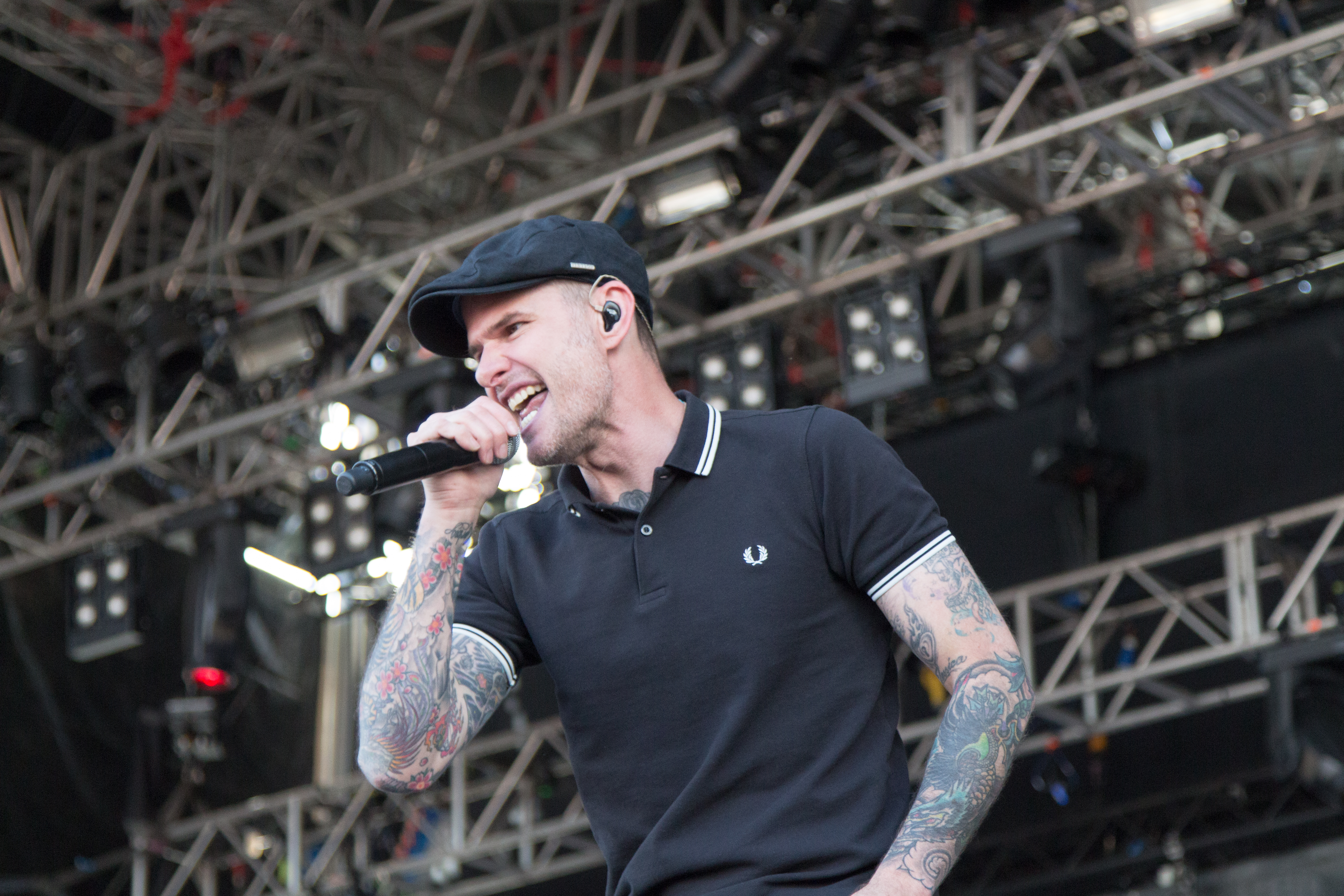
Al Barr from Dropkick Murphys at Nova Rock 2014

Fred Perry's popularity was boosted in the 2000s by several prominent bands wearing Fred Perry attire, including The Streets, The Rakes, Pete Doherty, the Arctic Monkeys, and Gwen Stefani of No Doubt. Singer Amy Winehouse was regularly pictured wearing Fred Perry clothing, and in 2010 the brand collaborated with her on a special range. Fred Perry brand director Richard Martin commented:

She was a massive Perryhead. We spoke to her management years ago about doing a collaboration through her stylist... When we met Amy, it was quite difficult to get her past purist Fred Perry products. She’d say, 'It's so perfect, how am I going to move it on?'

Winehouse's 17-piece fashion collection with the Fred Perry label was released for sale in October 2010. According to Fred Perry's marketing director Winehouse gave "crucial input on proportion, colour and fit." The collection consisted of "vintage-inspired looks including capri pants, a bowling dress, a trench coat, pencil skirts, a longline argyle sweater and a pink-and-black checkerboard-printed collared shirt." Following Winehouse's death in July 2011, at the behest of her family, three forthcoming collections up to and including autumn/winter 2012 that she had designed prior to her death were released. Fred Perry has donated 20% of the net revenue from the Amy Winehouse collection to the charity set up in Winehouse's name, the Amy Winehouse Foundation.

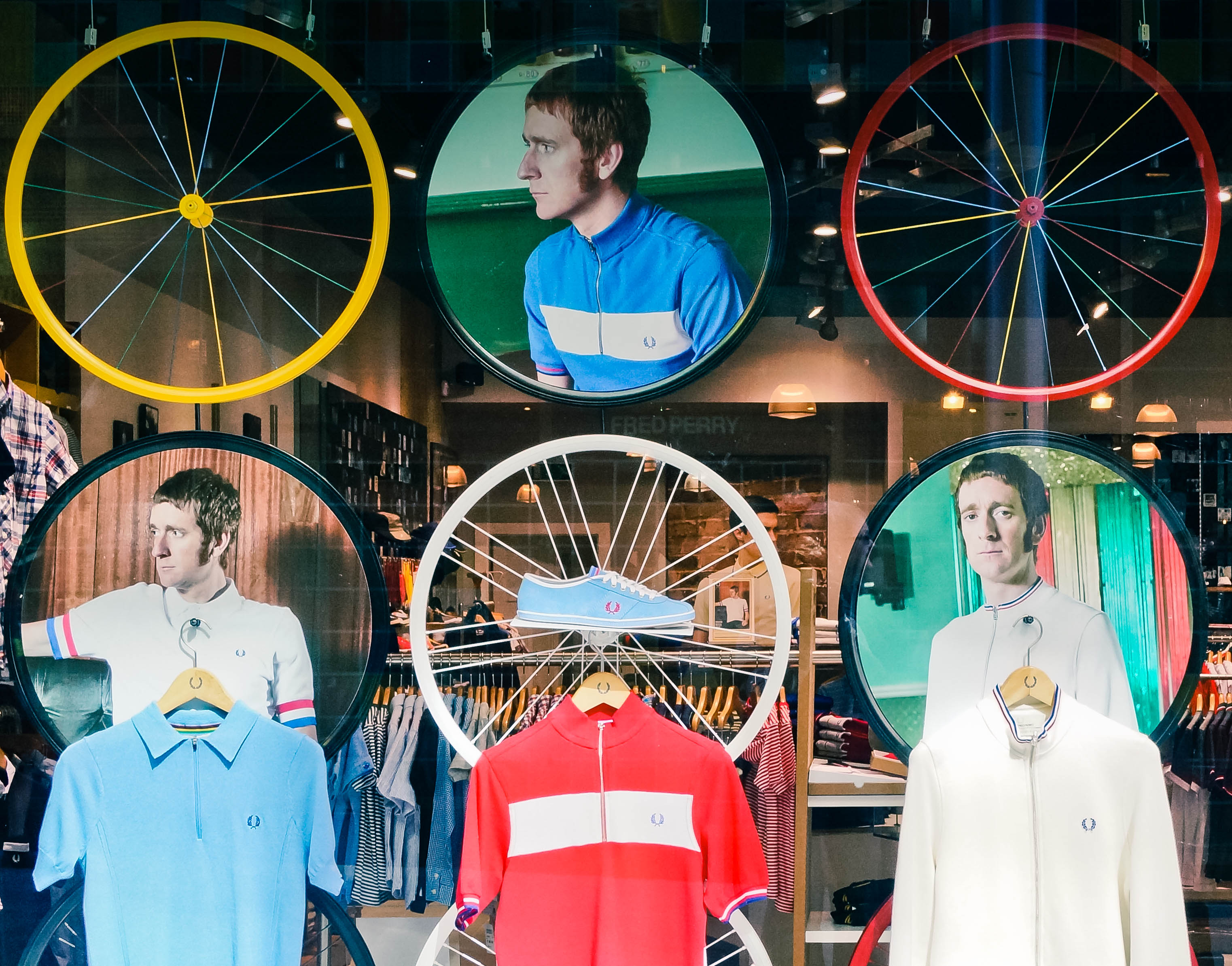
Bradley Wiggins' Fred Perry line in shop window in Liverpool, UK

Despite frequent association with the music scene, Fred Perry has retained an enduring connection to the sporting world. The brand was the clothing sponsor of British tennis player Andy Murray from the start of his career until 2009. Murray's Fred Perry years saw his rise from novice to contender for Grand Slams – wearing Fred Perry, Murray reached the final of the 2008 US Open, losing to Roger Federer. In 2013, shortly before he became the first British man to win Wimbledon since Fred Perry in 1936, Murray was asked what Fred Perry (who died in 1995) would say to him if he were still around, "Why are you not wearing my kit?" Murray quipped.

In July 2012 it was announced that the brand would collaborate with British Tour de France-winning cyclist Bradley Wiggins "to develop an authentic, non-technical range of cycle wear". The clothing range, known as the Bradley Wiggins X Fred Perry Collaboration, was launched in July 2012 under a six-year contract, with Wiggins also declaring himself a long-term fan of the Fred Perry brand.

== Brand identity ==
While the Ben Sherman brand has been described as having become a "safe choice" in recent years, Fred Perry, along with Lonsdale, is still considered 'edgy', or even controversial.

Fueled by sensationalist television, all skinheads were stereotyped as mindless, violent, and racist, with little attempt made to discriminate one subgroup from another. In the eyes of the media and the public, every skinhead was a racist, everyone who wore a Fred Perry shirt was a fascist, and everyone who wore Doc Martens boots was a Nazi.

In 2015, The Guardian wrote that Fred Perry is "a brand with its signature polo shirt that has consistently drawn on its heritage while remaining relevant."

In France, Fred Perry clothes are popular with both far-left and far-right activists, with both descending from the skinhead subculture. In June 2013, a fight broke out outside a private sale of Fred Perry apparel in Paris, in which far-left activist Clément Méric was killed by the far right.

In recent years, the Fred Perry company has published a series of statements communicating its support for diversity and tolerance; however this has not stopped ongoing debate as to what values the Fred Perry brand, and those wearing Fred Perry, represent.

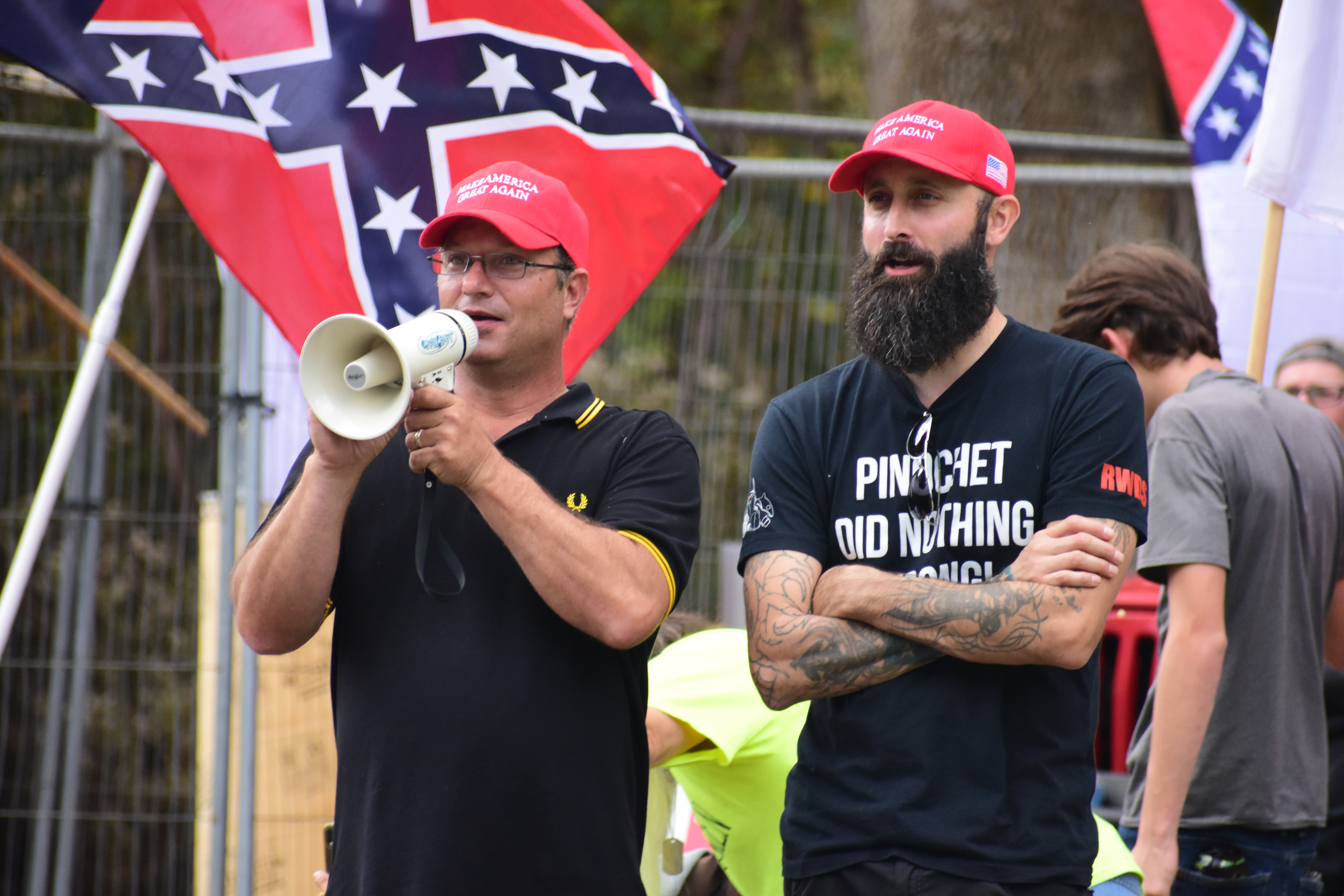
Proud Boys in Fred Perry, Pittsboro, 2019

The years from 2016 on saw the Fred Perry brand come to global attention again when Vice Media co-founder and former commentator Gavin McInnes founded a far-right group in North America, calling themselves the Proud Boys. The Proud Boys adopted one of Fred Perry's most iconic colour combinations, yellow and black, as their own.

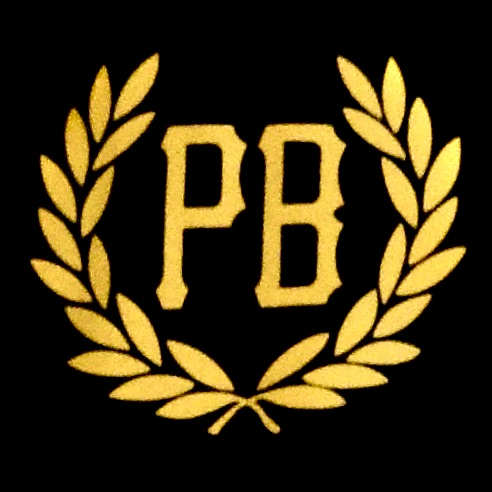
The Proud Boys logo

In 2017, Fred Perry's CEO John Flynn denounced the affiliation with the Proud Boys in a statement to CBC Radio, saying: "We don't support the ideals or the group that you speak of. It is counter to our beliefs and the people we work with." In 2019, Fred Perry announced that they would stop selling their yellow and black shirts in the United States. In September 2020, the retailer announced that it will not sell them in the United States until association with Proud Boys has ended. There is little sign of the actions by the Fred Perry company having any impact on the Proud Boys association with the brand – the Proud Boys logo is the iconic Fred Perry laurel with 'PB', and Proud Boys members continue to wear Fred Perry yellow and black polos.

In his life, Fred Perry himself never commented on the politics surrounding his brand. Shortly before his death in 1995, he made a comment on the brand's popularity:

Being a realistic man, I have never worried about admitting that my name is better known worldwide not for winning Wimbledon three times, but because of Fred Perry shirts and sportswear.

Controversial British journalist/blogger Graham Phillips is a known fan of Fred Perry.

== Operations ==
Fred Perry remained involved in his company all his life. In his later years, Perry family members, particularly his son David, took over the running of the company. In 1995, Fred Perry was bought by Japanese company Hit Union, and operates as a limited company. The head office of Fred Perry is London, and it has around 200 shops around the world. Following the 2022 Russian invasion of Ukraine, Fred Perry closed its two shops in Russia, in Moscow and St Petersburg. In another political statement, the Fred Perry company has also spoken against Russia's invasion of Ukraine.

Fred Perry employs 290 people in the UK, and a further 370 globally. Fred Perry has several charity, and community programmes, including The Fred Perry Tennis Trust, which provides free tennis lessons in the UK.

To this day, some Fred Perry products are still made in Leicester, United Kingdom, where the original Fred Perry shirt was first manufactured. The brand offers a range of clothing and accessories, male and female, as well as limited editions and collaborations. Fred Perry collaborations range from musicians to sportsmen, location releases and charities the brand works with. Fred Perry has an active presence in the UK community, running workshops and events across the country. The company runs the 'Museum of Youth Culture', in the UK.

At the end of 2022, Fred Perry reported a 20.8 percent increase in revenue, making £135.7 million in the year, and a 34 percent increase in pre-tax profit to £15.6 million, with net profit widening to £12.9 million.

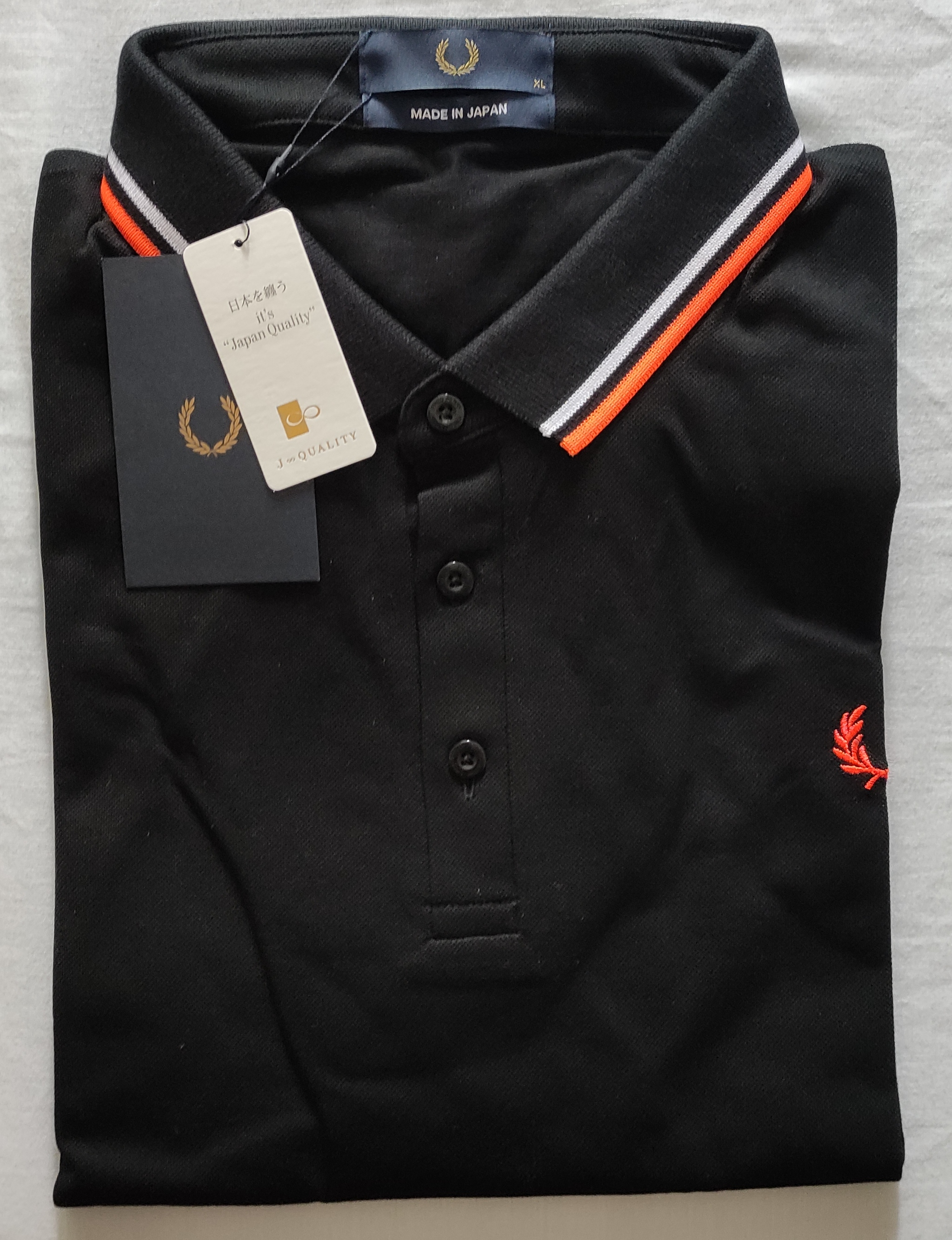
Fred Perry Polo

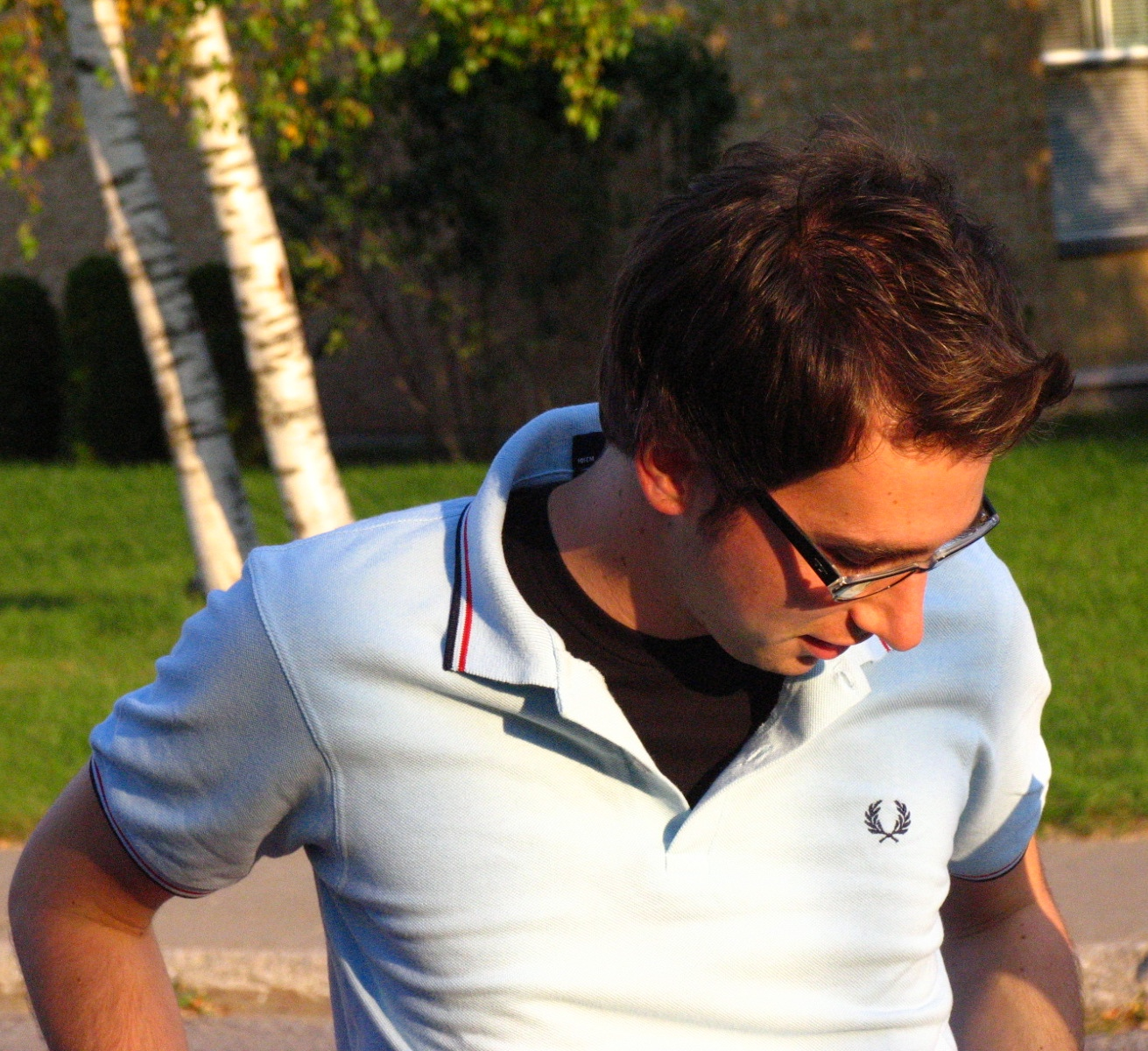
Fred Perry polo shirt

Fred Perry Kingston trainers

== See also ==
- Ben Sherman
- Burberry
- Castore
- Diesel (company)
- Dr Martens
- Levi jeans
- Lonsdale
- Next plc
