= Misk =

Misk may refer to:

Geography

- Misk Hills, a sandstone plateau in the East Midlands of England
- Misk'i, a mountain in the Bolivian Andes

Other

- Misk Foundation, a non-profit organisation in Saudi Arabia
- Abu al-Misk Kafur, a ruler of Ikhshidid Egypt and Syria in the 10th century CE
- Fedwa Misk, Moroccan journalist and women's rights campaigner
