= Salah Hamouri =

French-Palestinian lawyer (born 1985)

- صلاح حموري
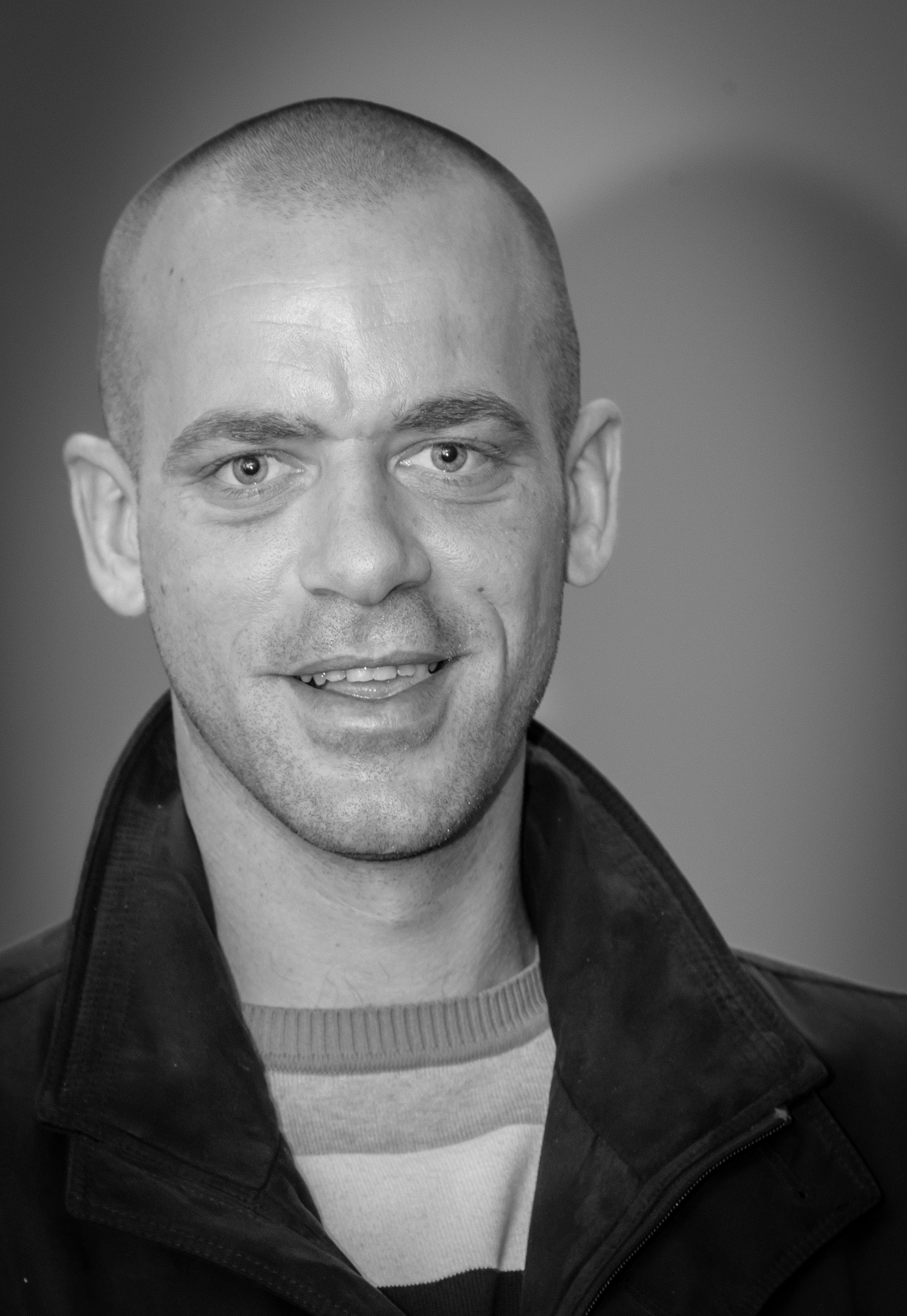
- Hamouri in 2012 (photo by Alain Bachellier)
- Born: 25 April 1985 (age 41); Jerusalem
- Education: Frères de Lasalle de Jérusalem, Bethlehem University
- Occupation: Lawyer

Salah Hamouri (Arabic: صلاح حموري; born 25 April 1985) is a French-Palestinian lawyer and field researcher for the Addameer Prisoner Support and Human Rights Association. His wife – who is French – has been barred since January 2016 from entering Israel or the Israeli-occupied West Bank to visit him.

Hamouri was arrested in 2005 and accused of plotting to murder Ovadia Yosef, founder of Israel's ultra-Orthodox Shas party and former Sephardic Chief Rabbi of Israel. After over 3 years' detention without trial, on the advice of his lawyer, while protesting his innocence he admitted culpability in a plea bargain in order to avoid a 14-year term of imprisonment, and was sentenced by a military tribunal to serve a 7 in jail. A number of committees have formed to protest against his treatment and affirm his innocence. Hamouri was released in exchange for the return of the Israeli POW Gilad Shalit in December 2011.

He has been repeatedly placed under a regime of administrative detention – which Amnesty International described as "a major human rights violation" It has been claimed that he has been held in detention for a crime of opinion.

== Biography ==
=== Early life and education ===
Salah Hamouri, is a native Jerusalemite, resident in the one neighbourhood, Dahyat el-Barid, of Al-Ram enclosed within Israel's Jerusalem municipal boundaries. He was one of three children—a brother, Amir, and a sister, Caroline—born to a French mother, Denise-Annick Hamouri, née Guidoux, from Bourg-en-Bresse, who teaches French at a private Catholic school in West Jerusalem, and a Palestinian father, Hassan Hamouri, who manages a restaurant in East Jerusalem. He is trilingual in Arabic, Hebrew and French, and has dual nationality, Palestinian and French, with French citizenship and an Israeli identity card.

An alumnus of the Catholic private school of Frères de Lasalle de Jérusalem in East Jerusalem, after his baccalaureate he enrolled in sociology at Bethlehem University, and subsequently studied law and qualified as a lawyer.

=== Early arrests and accusations ===
In the early months of the Al-Aqsa Intifada, Hamouri was shot in the thigh with live ammunition during a confrontation between Israeli troops and demonstrators at Al-Ram in northern Jerusalem. The bullet remained lodged there.

He was first arrested and placed under administrative detention when he was 16 years old, in 2001. He was caught handing out leaflets protesting Israeli "colonization," and was sentenced to five months in jail for "anti-Israeli propaganda" or/and for being a member of a student union (syndicat des étudiants). On his release he resumed his studies at the lyceum, and graduated in June 2003.

At 19, he was again arrested by the Shin Bet in 2004, and from February of that year served another five-month term in prison, without trial, on suspicion of being a member of George Habash's Popular Front for the Liberation of Palestine (PFLP), a Palestinian Marxist group regarded internationally as a terrorist organization. Hamouri has denied being a member of that organization, though he defends the movement as an integral member of the PLO and sympathises with its aims. (Note: "Le FPLP est un parti qui est connu au niveau international. C'est un parti membre de l'OLP [Organisation de libération de la Palestine], un parti progressiste qui connaît bien les valeurs de la démocratie et des droits de l'homme. C'est un parti qui a beaucoup fait pour la Palestine. Je suis bien avec ce parti qui a beaucoup fait, qui a des amis partout dans la France, dans l'Europe et dans le monde." (Misslin 2011))

=== Alleged involvement in a plot against Ovadia Yosef ===
In September 2005 Moussa Darwish (22) from the East Jerusalem neighborhood of Isawiya, who had joined the PFLP in 2000, confessed that he had planned to assassinate Ovadia Yosef, the head of the ultra-Orthodox Shas party. Darwish, after entering a plea bargain agreement, was sentenced to a 12-year prison term in mid-December of that year. Darwish had been employed by a grocery near Ovadia's house, and had made deliveries to his residence in Har Nof, something that afforded him the opportunity to case the property and familiarize himself with its security arrangements. He developed a plan, and suggested to another PFLP member that they kill Ovadia by shooting him while driving by on a motorbike. The two accomplices were believed to have visited Givat Shaul in December 2004 to prepare their attempt, but the plan was foiled the following month when a scheduled consignment of ammunition from a third party at the Shuafat checkpoint was blocked by the presence of IDF soldiers which made the proposed transfer too risky. In delivering their judgment the court stated that Darwish's plot, if executed, would have jeopardized the security of Israel by instigating revenge attacks against Arabs in Jerusalem.

The foiling of such a plot had been cleared for publication several months earlier in April 2005, a month after Hamouri's own arrest. It was reported then that, in addition to Darwish, Hamouri, then 19, and Moatsam (var. Muatztaf) Sheikh (25) from 'Anata, were involved. Security sources were reported as asserting that Hamouri together with a friend, having purchased arms, had driven past Ovadia's home in January 2005 in order to case it; that PFLP inmates incarcerated in Jericho on suspicion of being involved in the murder of Rehavam Ze'evi several years earlier had mulled the idea of selecting Ovadia as a target and this had filtered through to Hamouri during his detention. Other sources state that Darwish came up with the idea.

Hamouri was arrested on 13 March 2005 at the Qalqilya checkpoint while he was driving home to Ramallah. He was ordered to get out of his vehicle by soldiers, blindfolded and handcuffed, and arrested without explanation before being sent for detention in Jerusalem's Moscovia Detention Centre where he was held incommunicado under administrative detention for three months. Two hours later Israeli agents ransacked his parents' home in East Jerusalem, seizing his computer's hard disk, and even dismantling the toilet in search of evidence. His parents only learned of the charges laid against him from the newspapers a month later, where it was written that he had driven past Ovadia's home in January after having purchased arms.

Hamouri was kept in administrative detention for three years and eventually shifted to Gilboa prison near the Syrian border, where he learnt Hebrew in order to pursue courses given to prisoners there. No more than two books – one of which had to be of a religious nature – were allowed to detainees. (Note: A legal measure introduced on 30 October 2009. Lefort brought as a present 8 books and several French magazines, but these were disallowed, even after an attempt to explain that Jack London's The Iron Heel, as anyone could verify on the internet, was not political (Lefort 2009).)

Hamouri chose as his defense lawyer Leah Tsemel. On 16 February 2008, during a visit to Israel by Bernard Kouchner Hamouri's mother Denise managed to tell him she thought three years detention was more than enough. Kouchner took this as a request for a speedy trial, and two days later, the military prosecutor contacted Tsemel and offered a bargain: a seven-year term of imprisonment, rather than fourteen, if he admitted to the facts. The charges were that

- That he was a member of a youth cell of the PFLP
- That he intended to participate in a plot (against Ovadia).

The evidence for the latter was based on the fact that he was seen by an informer passing in front of Ovadia's home. The material for an indictment in the hands of the prosecution was thin. There was no physical evidence, weapons, intercepted letters, plan or phone taps. The only proof they could introduce consisted of testimonies, later retracted, given by other Palestinians, and Salah's own admission that he had indeed driven past Ovadia's home with a friend, one of the accused. Otherwise, Hamouri maintained he was innocent of the charges laid against him, and dismisses the idea that he and his friends were involved in a "plot".

On Tsemel's advice, while protesting his innocence, Hamouri entered into a plea bargaining arrangement before a military tribunal, – a compromise 95% of Palestinian prisoners adopt – admitting culpability in exchange for a 7-year prison sentence in order to avoid a longer term of imprisonment. (Note: "Après avoir longtemps clamé son innocence, il avait accepté de plaider coupable, échappant de la sorte à une peine plus lourde." (S.B. 2017)) Israeli authorities had also given him the option of either leaving Israel for 10 years (Note: 10 years, after which he would be permitted to return, according to Addameer. Hass and Jundi mention 15 years. Addameer also adds that Tsemel advised him that the term of exile could be reduced to 5 years, but that he preferred prison to that prospect (Addameer 2020).) or face 7 years in prison, Hamouri preferred incarceration to the prospect of exile.

=== 2011 Release: the Shalit prisoner exchange ===
Hamouri was eventually released on 18 December 2011 as part of a second tranche in a prisoner exchange deal between Israel and Hamas involving another French citizen, the soldier Gilad Shalit who had been captured by Hamas and used as a bargaining chip by Hamas for the release of Palestinian prisoners. A disparity has been noted in the two cases: (Note: "Il n'est pas tendre sur le fait qu'on refuse à sa mère d'être reçue à l'Elysée. C'est encore pour lui, comme pour nous, une source d'indignation. Il ne conteste pas que l'on cherche à libérer Guilad Shalit, non. Son problème est autre: pourquoi on ne traite pas son cas avec autant d'attention et une égale mobilisation en haut lieu?." (Lefort 2009)) while Shalit was detained, French diplomacy was highly active in endeavours to secure the release of the French-Israeli, whereas a parallel request that a French Palestinian's case be raised as a political issue was ignored. Requests by Hamouri's mother, a Frenchwoman with a son in detention, to be received by Nicolas Sarkozy at the Élysée were rebuffed. Sarkozy had requested Israel to release Hamouri during his visit to the country in June 2008, and the following year in a letter to the Prime Minister on 30 July 2009, asked for clemency and a reduction of his sentence by a third in recognition of his good behaviour, as did Bernard Kouchner.

With the appointment of Alain Juppé as head of Foreign Affairs at the Quai d'Orsay, there was a slight change in the climate. Juppé wrote to Marie-France Beaufils, a senator, on 31 March 2011 that:

I regret that the Israeli authorities did not make a decision to remit the sentence, especially as the confession made at the hearing was not corroborated by any evidence. I appreciate his family's grief as he is at an age for dedicating himself to study. I also understand that the person concerned has chosen not to ask for a pardon. It's an attitude worthy of respect. (Note: "Je déplore que les autorités israéliennes n'aient pas pris de décision de remise de peine, d'autant que les aveux faits à l'audience n'ont été corroborés par aucun élément de preuve. Je mesure la peine de sa famille alors qu'il est à présent en âge de s'investir dans des études. Je comprends également que l'intéressé a fait le choix de ne pas solliciter de demande de grâce. C'est une attitude respectable." (Dalle 2014))

Hamouri's release was conditioned on Ovadia's consent, which the latter gave reportedly in order to secure Shalit's release. Binjamin Netanyahu had regularly turned down official French requests for clemency on the grounds that he had to defer to the views of Ovadia. In 2011 Sarkozy therefore repeated the request directly in a letter to Ovadia, who, after consulting with Zvi Ammar in Marseille, (Note: Zvi Ammar, President of the Israelite consistory of Marseille, was under challenge at the time by part of the local Jewish community after being implicated in a case of alleged swindling and forgery. Ammar's advice to Ovadia was to accept Sarkozy's request, and Ammar then informed his local community that the gesture would help mend relations between Israel and France, which had been under stress recently, and also a signal to Palestinians to return to peace negotiations (Marsactu 2010; Noir 2011).) replied that he would not oppose Harmouri's release. On regaining his freedom, when asked about his imprisonment, Hamouri replied he had no regrets about the choices he had made. With regard to Ovadia, he stated that the rabbi was and would remain a symbol of racism and fanaticism in Israel: Ovadia had likened Palestinians to reptiles in 2000, suggested that Arabs be wiped out with missiles, and hoped that God would smite them with a plague. His remarks were construed in Israeli media as confirming a desire by Hamouri that Ovadia be killed, a suggestion he rebuffed as a lie churned out by propaganda machinery.

His wife later commented that in Hamouri's case, French diplomacy had been based on "discretion": "they have been very discreet. The mere fact of being imprisoned in Israel turns one into a suspect, despite everything." (Note: "Ça, ils ont été très discrets, ironise-t-elle d'une voix lasse. Etre incarcéré en Israël fait de vous un suspect malgré tout." (Pilorget-Rezzouk 2018))

In France many commentators, prominent among them Pascal Boniface, have noted a striking incongruency between the way French diplomacy showcased the imprisonment of Shalit and treated his release as a matter of urgency, and the muted discretion – some say 'indifference' – shown to Hamouri's plight during his incarceration without trial for three years.

=== New studies (2011-2016) ===
Hamouri changed his vocational interests from sociology to law, and enrolled as a law student at Al Quds University near Abu Dis in the West Bank. His access to the university suffered from several bureaucratic hassles (tracasseries) regarding his freedom of movement. (Note: "Depuis sa libération, Salah Hamouri fait l'objet de tracasseries. Récemment, il s'est vu interdit de séjour en Cisjordanie et donc de terminer ses études de droit.") "On several occasions, Israeli authorities banned him from entering the West Bank, affecting his ability to pursue his education.") In April 2015, the military commander of the West Bank Nitzan Alon banned him from entering the area for a period of six months, from 24 March until 24 September 2015, meaning that he would not be able to sit his exam in July to qualify as a lawyer. He subsequently enrolled in graduate school for a master's degree in human rights. The ban was renewed twice hindering his practical training to be a lawyer. The restriction, whose rationale was unexplained, lasted continuously for one and a half years, destroying his social life, obstructing his participation in social events with family such as weddings and graduation ceremonies; and denied him access to his workplace in Ramallah, or visiting his parents in Al-Ram.

=== Re-arrest and legal proceedings (2017-early 2020s) ===
On 20 August 2017, having completed his legal studies, Hamouri was admitted to the Palestinian bar as a qualified lawyer. He lacked only certification to practice, which was scheduled on taking an oath in September. Three days later, he was re-arrested during a night raid on his home in Kafr Aqab on 23 August, and placed under detention for five days. His family only learned of his arrest after his neighbour phoned them. A hearing took place on 27 August, and, when the prosecution failed to list a charge sheet for indictment, the judge ordered his release conditionally: he was to be confined for 10 days in Reineh, banned from Jerusalem for 3 months, prohibited from travel for the same period, and required to post bail for $3,000. His father immediately undertook to post the bail, but the bureaucratic procedure took time. Before it was completed, on the 29 August the Israeli Minister for Defense Avigdor Lieberman issued an order once more placing him under the regime of administrative detention for six months in Ktzi'ot Prison in the Negev where his mother was permitted to visit him for 45 minutes once a month. The detention blocked his completion of his master's degree in law.

On 5 September, a date set aside to confirm the order, the Jerusalem Magistrate Court, rather than confirm the order, adopted a different decision, determining that Hamouri was to serve the three months in prison remaining over from his 2005 conviction. This ruling was challenged by the prosecution and eventually, the Israeli District Court ruled in its favour, reinstating the 6 month detention order. In November, Israel declared seven members of a French delegation of 20 politicians intending to visit Israel to examine the state of Palestinians in detention, as personae non gratae. Among the seven denied entry were Pierre Laurent, Clémentine Autain, Patrick Le Hyaric and Pascal Durand. The other 13 were given entry permits conditional on their not meeting Marwan Barghouti and Hamouri. On 28 December 2017 Israeli authorities informed him he would be moved to the high-security Megiddo prison for engaging in "incitement": he had given an interview with a French journalist and had discussed the techniques used by the IPS in dealing with people under conditions of administrative detention (Addameer 2018).

The order was renewed for another four months on the expiry of its term in February 2018. Amnesty International's Deputy Director for the Middle East and North Africa demanded that Israel either release him or charge him immediately, since in the view of that organization the detention regime under which he is held places him in an "indefinite limbo" on secret evidence he or his lawyers have no access to.

Hamouri was due to be released on the expiry of his second term of detention without trial on 30 June. On 1 July, however, the regime of administrative detention was prolonged by another three months. 109 French public figures, including the socialist Senator Monique Cerisier-ben Guiga offered collectively to take his place in jail, as hostages, to permit his release. After serving 13 consecutive months in prison without trial, he was finally released on 30 September 2018. The allegations against him remained unspecified but the terms of his release stated he was prohibited from demonstrations, protests or celebrating the occasion for one month, and he was required to post a bond of $825 to that effect. While in Europe he made frequent public appearances to plead for an improvement in the conditions of incarceration of some 6,000 Palestinian prisoners.

==== 2020 ====
In 2018 a law was passed in the Knesset empowering the Israeli government to revoke permanent resident status in cases where it deemed a person had committed what it calls a "breach of trust against the state". In one calculation the use of breach of trust to expel Palestinian residents predates this bill, with at least 15 Palestinians being stripped of their residency rights on those grounds since 2006. In February 2019, the Israeli Ministry of Strategic Affairs issued a report in which Hamouri is one of three prominent Palestinian human rights figures – the other two being Shawan Jabarin, director-general of the Al-Haq organization, and Raja Sourani, director of the Palestinian Centre for Human Rights – listed as "terrorists in suits".

Hamouri was arrested on Tuesday 30 June 2020 near a Sheikh Jarrah Health Centre while taking a COVID-19 test, preliminary to leaving on a flight to Paris the following Saturday, 4 July. He was then taken to the Moscovia Detention Centre and detained there for 8 days for "further investigations", until he secured release by paying a further $US290 to the $585 in bail money he had already posted, with an interdiction order not to speak for three months (90 days) to a number of people, though he was not provided with a list of their names.

On 3 September, he was informed by letter by Interior Minister Aryeh Deri, now the head of Ovadia's Shas party, that his residency permit would be revoked. He was given a month to appeal the decision. The reason given was that it was believed that Hamouri continued to be an active member of the PFLP and as such was classified as an internal enemy as part of Israel's ongoing war against terrorism. (Note: Anna Azari, Israel's Foreign Ministry deputy director-general for Europe, stated: "Israel is committed to fighting terror and is acting against the terrorists among us, as France and many other countries in the world do." (Harkov 2020)) The French government registered an official protest, requesting that his expulsion be postponed and that he be allowed to rejoin his family.

On 7 September, the International Federation for Human Rights (FIDH) expressed alarm at what they called the "judicial harassment" of Hamouri, and argued that the Israeli law (Entry into Israel Law of 1952, article 11) used to revoke Hamouri's residential status violates International Humanitarian Law. Secondly they argued that the law is also in breach of Article 49 of the Fourth Geneva Convention, according to which

Individual or mass forcible transfers, as well as deportations of protected persons from occupied territory to the territory of the Occupying Power or to that of any other country, occupied or not, are prohibited, regardless of their motive.

In the opinion of Munir Nusseibeh of Al-Quds university, the planned measure also violates article 8 of the statute of the International Criminal Court, and the implementation of the expulsion would make Aryeh Deri liable to prosecution for a war crime.

=== Deportation and exile in France (2020s) ===
In December 2022, Hamouri was deported from Israel to France, with the Israeli Interior Ministry citing security concerns. The French government condemned the move, claiming it violated his right to live in his native Jerusalem. Critics of the move said that Israel was committing a war crime and the expulsion was ethnic cleansing. His deportation was condemned by Amnesty International, and the European Parliament.

Following his expulsion from Israel, Hamouri filed a complaint in Paris on March 28, 2024, for arbitrary detention and torture, to denounce the conditions of his incarceration in Israel in 2022. An investigating judge has been investigating his claims since July 2024.

In 2025, he was invited to hold a conference at the Lyon Antifa Fest, leading the Prefect of the Rhône to ban the event. This decree, issued on the eve of the scheduled event and eight days after French authorities were found at fault for cutting subsidies to the venue hosting the festival, was subsequently overturned by the courts.

== Personal life ==
On 29 May 2014, he married Elsa Lefort, an employee of the Institut français du Proche-Orient, resident in East Jerusalem and daughter of the French politician Jean-Claude Lefort, long time French Communist Party deputy and secretary to Georges Marchais.

On 5 January 2016, his wife, then six months pregnant, was arrested and detained for two days after arriving at Ben-Gurion Airport and thereafter expelled from Israel, despite having a consular visa valid until October of that year. Previous attempts to renew her visa had met with repeated refusals on the grounds that her husband was free as part of a prisoners' exchange deal, which automatically left him blacklisted by every branch of the Israeli government. (Note: This reason for blacklisting has been raised by his lawyers subsequently. Since the prisoner exchange took place three months earlier than the expiry of his original sentence, they have asked that he be allowed to serve out those remaining three months instead of being repeatedly kept in administrative detention. This was at first accepted by a judge in 2017, appealed by the prosecution to the High Court, which ruled in favour of administrative detention (Addameer 2020).) She was forbidden to reenter either Israel or the West Bank under military administration, for a period of 10 years, on the grounds that she constituted a threat to the security of Israel. When he is held in detention no correspondence is allowed between Hamouri and his wife.

Both his wife and his father-in-law, since deceased, were subject to harassment and threats after a website published their addresses. By refusing to allow his wife to finish her pregnancy in Jerusalem, the Israeli authorities automatically deprived their child of the right to a residency permit in that city, a decision that, it has been argued, also reflected a battle for demographic ascendency, (Note: Munir Nusseibeh: "The revocation of residency is a penalty within the framework of the demographic war in Jerusalem." (Jundi 2020)) as reflected in the policy of the Judaization of Jerusalem. (Note: "Since first occupying East Jerusalem in 1967, Israel has passed policies seeking to forcibly erase Palestinians ties to the city to establish a Jewish-centric narrative of the city – a process known as Judaisation." (Jundi 2020))

== Sources ==
- Abdallah, Stéphanie Latte (2019). Israël/Palestine, l'illusion de la séparation (in French). Presses Universitaires de Provence. ISBN 979-1-036-54215-2.
- "Administrative detention of NGO worker Salah Hammouri extended". Amnesty International. 26 February 2018.
- Arefi, Armin (20 October 2011). "Gilad Shalit, Salah Hamouri: même combat?". Le Point (in French).
- Associated Press; Ravid, Barak (6 August 2009). "Israel to Review Sarkozy Request to Free French-Palestinian Militant". Haaretz.
- Ayad, Christophe (18 October 2008). "Israël: un Français aux oubliettes". Libération (in French).
- Bastier, Claire (25 August 2017). "Le Franco-Palestinien Salah Hamouri une nouvelle fois arrêté par Israël". Le Monde (in French).
- Ben-Ami, Nina (4 December 2008). "Affaire Salah Hamouri: la réponse de l'ambassade d'Israël". Le Nouvel Observateur (in French).
- Biasoni, Sami; Nogaret, Anne-Sophie (2020). Français malgré eux: racialistes, décolonialistes, indigénistes: enquête sur ceux qui veulent déconstruire la France (in French). L'artilleur. ISBN 978-2-810-00938-1.
- Bouin, Jérôme (29 July 2009). "Israël refuse la libération d'un détenu français". Le Figaro (in French).
- "Council Decision 2012/333/Cfsp". Official Journal of the European Union. 26 June 2012.
- Dalle, Ignace (2014). La Ve République et le monde arabe (in French). Fayard. ISBN 978-2-213-66476-7.
- Dendoune, Nadir (31 May 2015). "Why was the Salah Hamouri case absent in the French media?". Palestine News Network. Archived from the original on 18 August 2022.
- Dendoune, Nadir (7 July 2020). "L'avocat franco-palestinien Salah Hamouri est libre". Le Courrier de l'Atlas (in French).
- "Dix personnalités s'offrent en otages pour faire libérer Salah Hamouri". Politis (in French). 2 July 2018.
- "Ex-Palestinian prisoner: No regrets on Yosef plot". The Jerusalem Post. Reuters. 20 December 2011.
- "Expulsé d'Israël, l'avocat franco-palestinien Salah Hamouri porte plainte pour tortures". Mediapart (in French). 4 April 2024.
- "Foreign Terrorist Organizations". U.S. Department of State.
- Gouëset, Catherine (2 February 2016). "Le combat d'une Française pour retrouver son mari et accoucher à Jérusalem". L'Express (in French).
- Hamouri, Denise (28 December 2008). "La réponse de la mère de Salah Hamouri à l'ambassade d'Israël". Le Nouvel Observateur (in French).
- Hamouri, Salah (15 November 2019). "Saint-Brieuc. L'avocat palestinien Salah Hamouri témoigne des conditions de détention". Ouest-France (in French).
- Harel, Amos (18 April 2005). "PFLP Members Held in Plot to Assassinate Rabbi Ovadia Yosef". Haaretz. Archived from the original on 13 March 2022.
- Harkov, Lahav (8 September 2020). "France protests Israel's deportation of terrorist who planned to kill chief rabbi". The Jerusalem Post.
- "Israël : un juge français enquête sur de possibles tortures sur l'avocat Salah Hamouri". Le Figaro (in French). 3 September 2024.
- Hass, Amira (15 September 2020). "Israel Is Using a Legal Trick to Expel a Jerusalem Native". Haaretz.
- "Israel and Occupied Palestinian Territories 2019". Amnesty International. 2019.
- "Israel deports Palestinian activist to France despite Paris objections". Sky News. 18 December 2022.
- "Israel Detains French Human Rights Worker Without Charge". Human Rights Watch. 10 December 2017.
- "Israel frees French-Palestinian after 13 months without trial". The Times of Israel. AFP. 30 September 2018.
- "Israël libère l'avocat franco-palestinien, Salah Hamouri, après plus d'un an de détention". Libération (in French). AFP. 30 September 2018.
- "Israeli legal group threatens to sue Australian charity for funding terror group". The Times of Israel. JTA. 14 October 2012.
- "Israeli Occupation Punishes al-Hammouri by Transferring him from al-Naqab to Megiddo Prison". Addameer. 2 January 2018.
- Jones, Evan (9 July 2014). "The Israel Lobby and French Politics". CounterPunch.
- "Judicial harassment against Mr. Salah Hamouri". FIDH. 7 September 2020.
- Jundi, Aseel (10 September 2020). "Franco-Palestinian lawyer latest target of Israel's Jerusalem residency revocation policy". Middle East Eye.
- Lefort, Jean-Claude [in French] (17 February 2009). "Ma rencontre avec Salah Hamouri". L'Humanité (in French).
- Louis, Cyrille (13 November 2017). "Le gouvernement israélien s'apprête à refouler sept élus français". Le Figaro (in French).
- Misslin, Frédérique (24 December 2011). "Salah Hamouri: la division interpalestinienne est un cadeau pour l'occupation" (in French). RFI.
- "MOFA: Implementation of the Measures including the Freezing of Assets against Terrorists and the Like". Ministry of Foreign Affairs of Japan. 5 July 2002.
- Noir, Thierry (12 October 2011). "Nicolas Sarkozy intervient en faveur de Salah Hamouri". Le Point (in French).
- "Palestinian NGO worker released: Salah Hammouri". Amnesty International. 26 October 2018.
- Pelé, Audrey (18 December 2011). "Libéré, Salah Hamouri a toujours clamé son innocence". Le Figaro (in French).
- Piddiu, Laureen (2 July 2020). "L'avocat franco-palestinien Salah Hamouri a été arrêté mardi, par les autorités israéliennes. Sa femme Elsa Lefort, porte-parole du Comité de soutien Salah Hamouri, exige sa libération". La Marseillaise (in French).
- Pilorget-Rezzouk, Chloé (13 December 2018). "Elsa Lefort, épouse la cause". Libération (in French).
- Rose, Emily (18 December 2022). "Israel deports Palestinian lawyer Salah Hamouri to France over security, interior ministry says". Reuters.
- Rosner, Tal (29 September 2005). "Palestinian plots to kill Ovadia Yosef". Ynetnews.
- Rosner, Tal (15 December 2005). "Arab who plotted to kill Ovadia Yosef sentenced". Ynetnews.
- S.B. (4 September 2017). "Qui est Salah Hamouri, Franco-Palestinien arrêté par Israël?". Le Nouvel Observateur (in French).
- "Salah Hammouri: Israel deports Palestinian lawyer to France". BBC News. 18 December 2022.
- "Salah Hamouri". Addameer. 16 September 2020. Archived from the original on 30 September 2020.
- "Salah Hamouri, de Bourg-en-Bresse par sa mère et emprisonné en Israël". La Voix de l'Ain (in French). 21 December 2017.
- "Salah Hamouri, Franco-Palestinian prisoner freed from Israeli jail in exchange deal, says his government invested more efforts in releasing Gilad Shalit, kidnapped Israeli-French soldier, than in securing his own release". Reuters. 30 December 2011.
- Samidoun (4 April 2015). "Former prisoner and current law student Salah Hamouri banned from West Bank". Palestinian prisoner Solidarity Network.
- Solé, Jordi; Bricmont, Saskia; Alfonsi, François; Gruffat, Claude; et al. (9 December 2022). "MOTION FOR A RESOLUTION on the prospects for the two-state solution for Israel and Palestine | B9-0556/2022 | European Parliament".
- Velilla, Philippe (2010). Les Juifs et la droite: Israël et la diaspora entre Netanyahou, Sarkozy et Obama (in French). Éditions Pascal. ISBN 978-2-350-19077-8.
- Wagman, Richard (2018). "Interview with Salah Hamouri". Palestine, a Jewish Question. Cambridge Scholars Publishing. pp. 157–161. ISBN 978-1-527-52224-4.
- "Why was The Salah Hamouri Case Absent in the French Media?". Palestine News Network. 31 May 2015. Archived from the original on 18 August 2022.
- "Zvi Ammar, le Président du Consistoire Israélite de Marseille dans la tempête". Marsactu (in French). 18 December 2010.
