= Qandisha =

Qandisha is a French language online magazine for women in Morocco and the wider Arab world. It was founded in 2011 by Fedwa Misk, a Moroccan journalist, feminist, and women's rights activist, and a group of other women concerned that women's rights were being ignored by the media during the Arab Spring. The publication is a hybrid between a magazine and a webzine, and is a collaborative effort, encouraging participation from its readers.

== History and profile ==
Qandisha was established in 2011 and is published in French. The name is derived from Qandisa, a female jinn from Moroccan folklore. The magazine focuses on a range of subjects including political and social current events. In an interview, Fedwa Misk stated "We want to give a boost to all the women who want to discuss and comment on current events, whether political or social – to encourage women to speak up. In our Arab Muslim conservative countries, women are less inclined to make their voices heard." The magazine is developing video and audio content in both French and Darija, a colloquial form of Arabic. The magazine often covers controversial subjects and the website has been hacked on more than one occasion.
