= Ben Sherman =

British clothing brand

Ben Sherman Group Limited
- Founded: 1963 in Brighton, England
- Founder: Ben Sherman (born Arthur Benjamin Sugarman)
- Products: Mod, casual clothing
- Revenue: US$256,200,000 (Oxford Industries Annual Report 2016)
- Parent: Marquee Brands

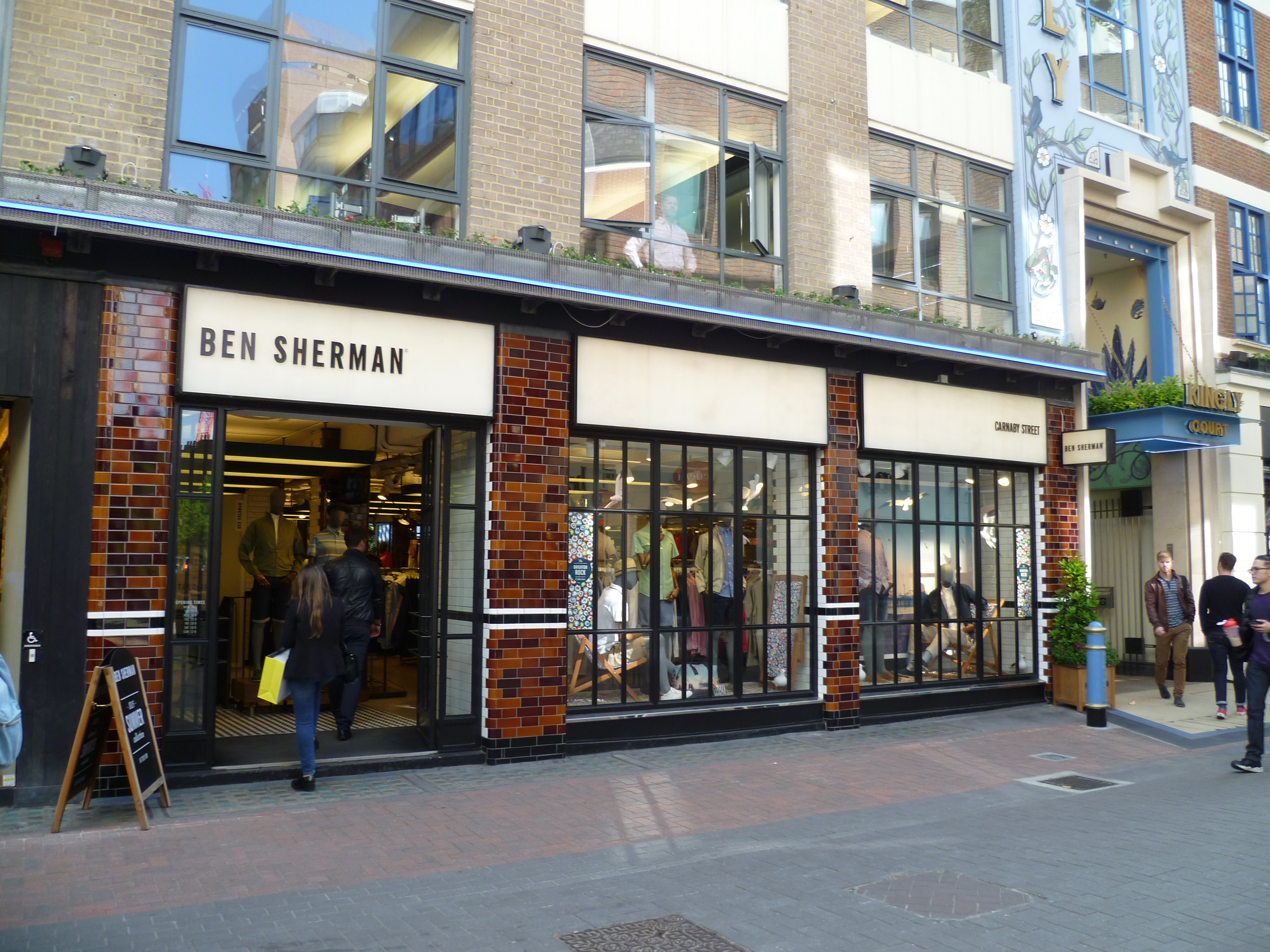
A Ben Sherman shop in Carnaby Street, London

Ben Sherman is a British clothing brand selling shirts, sweaters, suits, outerwear, shoes and accessories predominantly for men. Ben Sherman has been described as an 'iconic British brand'. Ben Sherman designs sometimes feature the Royal Air Force roundel which is often called the mod target. In its beginnings in the 1960s, the company made its mark with fashionable short sleeved, button-down collared shirts.

== History ==
The company was founded in 1963 by Arthur Benjamin Sugarman (1925–1987), the son of a Jewish salesman, born in Brighton. Sugarman emigrated to the United States in 1946, via Canada, where he later became a naturalised US citizen. He married the daughter of a Californian clothes producer and later returned to Brighton, where he established a shirt factory at 21 Bedford Square in 1963. Sugarman spotted that early 1960s London-based modern jazz fans were eagerly buying Oxford cloth American button-down shirt brands such as Brooks Brothers, Arrow, and Hathaway, that were worn by visiting American jazz artists including Miles Davis, Dizzy Gillespie, and Canadian jazz artist Oscar Peterson. At the time, these were only available from official importers. He decided to produce a version of these shirts.

Mods quickly embraced the brand, especially as Sugarman was using higher-quality materials and stitching detail than the imported shirts. The Ben Sherman Originals label was created, and by 1965, the company had opened a small office on the upper floors of an office-block in a London backstreet. This acted as the showroom for their shirt and beachwear collections. The first Ben Sherman store was opened on Brighton's Duke Street in 1967. Writing of the brand in 2015, the Guardian wrote that it was "on a par with labels like Fred Perry for the mod set in the 60s".

Ben Sherman remained popular in the late 70s and early 80s as acts including The Jam, The Specials, and Madness helped the brand appeal to the mod revival and rude boy movements. The brand also, along with Fred Perry, Lonsdale, Dr. Martens, and to a lesser extent Levi's, became associated with skinheads at this time.

Benjamin Sugarman sold his business in 1975 and retired to Australia. The company passed through a number of hands in the following years. In 1993, British investor 3i backed a management buyout of Ben Sherman Limited from Northern Ireland-based Dunkeld fashion group, then in receivership, for £4 million which resulted in the creation of the Sherman Cooper Group. In 2000, 3i financed a second management-buyout that created Ben Sherman PLC. In mid-2004, Oxford Industries Inc. of Atlanta purchased the Ben Sherman brand for £80 million (then US$146 million) from 3i and Irish venture capital company Enterprise Equity. In October 2009, Ben Sherman opened a store at 39 Savile Row. Oxford Industries Inc. completed the sale of Ben Sherman to Marquee Brands, controlled by the US investment group Neuberger Berman for £41m in 2015. In turn, UK operations were licensed out to The Baird Group (BMB Clothing).

At the 2021 Tokyo Olympics, Team GB’s opening ceremony outfits were designed by Ben Sherman creative director Mark Williams. Drawing on the Mod heritage of the brand, athletes wore civilian Harrington jackets and button-down shirts. In March 2024, the company launched its first ever golf-focused apparel collection. At the 2024 Paris Olympics, Ben Sherman once again outfitted Team GB.

=== Image ===
The Ben Sherman brand has often been compared to fellow British clothing brand Fred Perry and Lonsdale. As well as being worn by several prominent bands, Ben Sherman has also been featured in several films, including 2006's This is England.

In July 2015, The Guardian described Ben Sherman as being at a 'low ebb as a trendsetter,' saying that Ben Sherman was now a 'safe choice', but that 'history could help its relaunch'.

== See also ==
- Burberry
- Castore
- Diesel (company)
- Dr Martens
- Fred Perry (clothing label)
- Levi jeans
- Lonsdale
- Next plc
