= Louise Ebrel =

Breton singer (1932–2020)

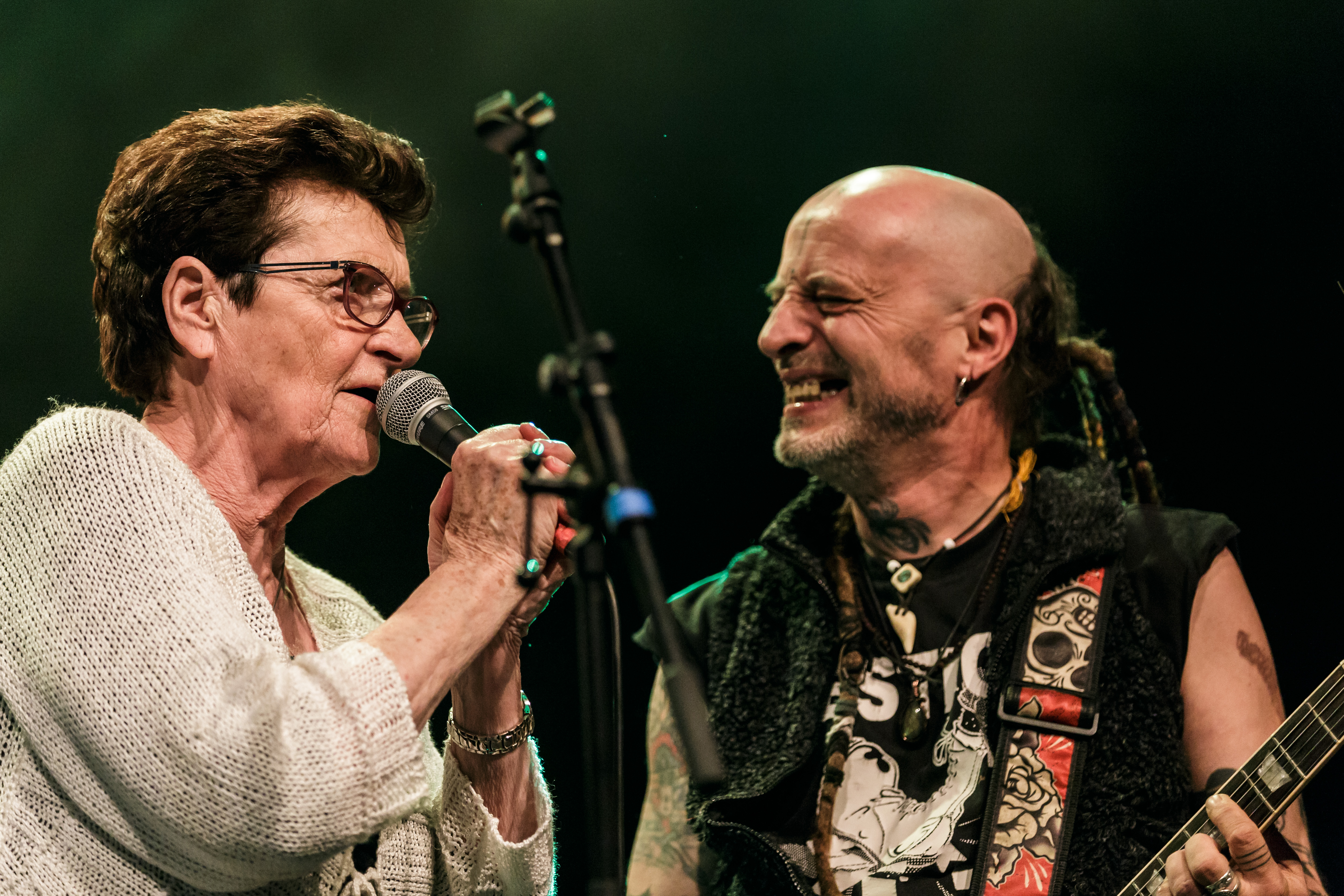
Louise Ebrel with Loran, punk guitarist of Les Ramoneurs de menhirs.

Louise Ebrel (27 July 1932 – 30 March 2020) was a Breton singer whose parents Eugénie Goadec (one of the Goadec Sisters) and Job Ebrel were themselves singers. Her repertoire was composed of traditional Breton songs, either for dancing (kan ha diskan) or for listening (gwerz).

Ebrel was born at Treffrin in the Côtes-du-Nord (the present Côtes d'Armor). From 1991 to 2006 she accompanied the singer-poet Denez Prigent in concerts, both as a duo and with his musical group. Since 1996 she frequently sang with Ifig Flatrès in kan ha diskan at festoù noz. Since 2006 she performed on Breton stages with the punk group Les Ramoneurs de menhirs and the rockers of Red Cardell as well as the ensemble The Celtic Social Club founded in 2014.
