= Killing of Clément Méric =

2013 incident in Paris, France

- Location: 48.8748°N 2.3284°E; Rue de Caumartin, 9th arrondissement, Paris, France
- Date: 5 June 2013; 13 years ago
- Attack type: Beating
- Weapon: Brass knuckles (disputed)
- Deaths: Clément Méric
- Charges: Manslaughter, weapon supply
- Convicted: Esteban Morillo, Samuel Dufour

On 5 June 2013, a fight between far-left and far-right activists in Paris resulted in the death of 18-year-old left-winger Clément Méric (French pronunciation: [klemɑ̃ meʁik]). Two far-right skinheads, Esteban Morillo and Samuel Dufour, were charged for his death. In September 2018, they were convicted of manslaughter and weapon supply respectively, and sentenced to 11 and 5 years in prison respectively. Morillo was freed on licence that November after an appeal, Dufour in January 2019, and a second trial began in December 2019. In June 2021, they were sentenced to 8 and 5 years respectively. The lengthy judicial process centred around contentious points: Méric's own responsibility in the violence, and whether or not the accused had brass knuckles, an illegal weapon regardless of context.

== Clément Méric ==
Clément Méric was from Brest, Brittany. He was the youngest child in his family, and moved to Paris at age 17, to become a student at Sciences Po. Méric was known to the police as a member of a far-left group that actively sought out violent confrontation with the far-right. Méric was in remission for leukaemia at the time of his death.

== Esteban Morillo and Samuel Dufour ==
Morillo was born in December 1992 in Cádiz, Spain and grew up in Neuilly-Saint-Front in the department of Aisne. The village's mayor, André Rigaud, described his parents as normal people, but in 2010 opened a police investigation into Morillo and his neo-Nazi gang. In May 2011 he received a criminal record for knife and brass knuckle possession. Eighteen months before the fight, he had moved to Saint-Ouen-sur-Seine in the Parisian region, to live with his girlfriend and work as a security guard. Both were members of Troisième Voie, a far-right organisation. Dufour was born in Dieppe and was an apprentice baker. He was also a member of Troisième Voie and had neo-Nazi tattoos.

== Death ==
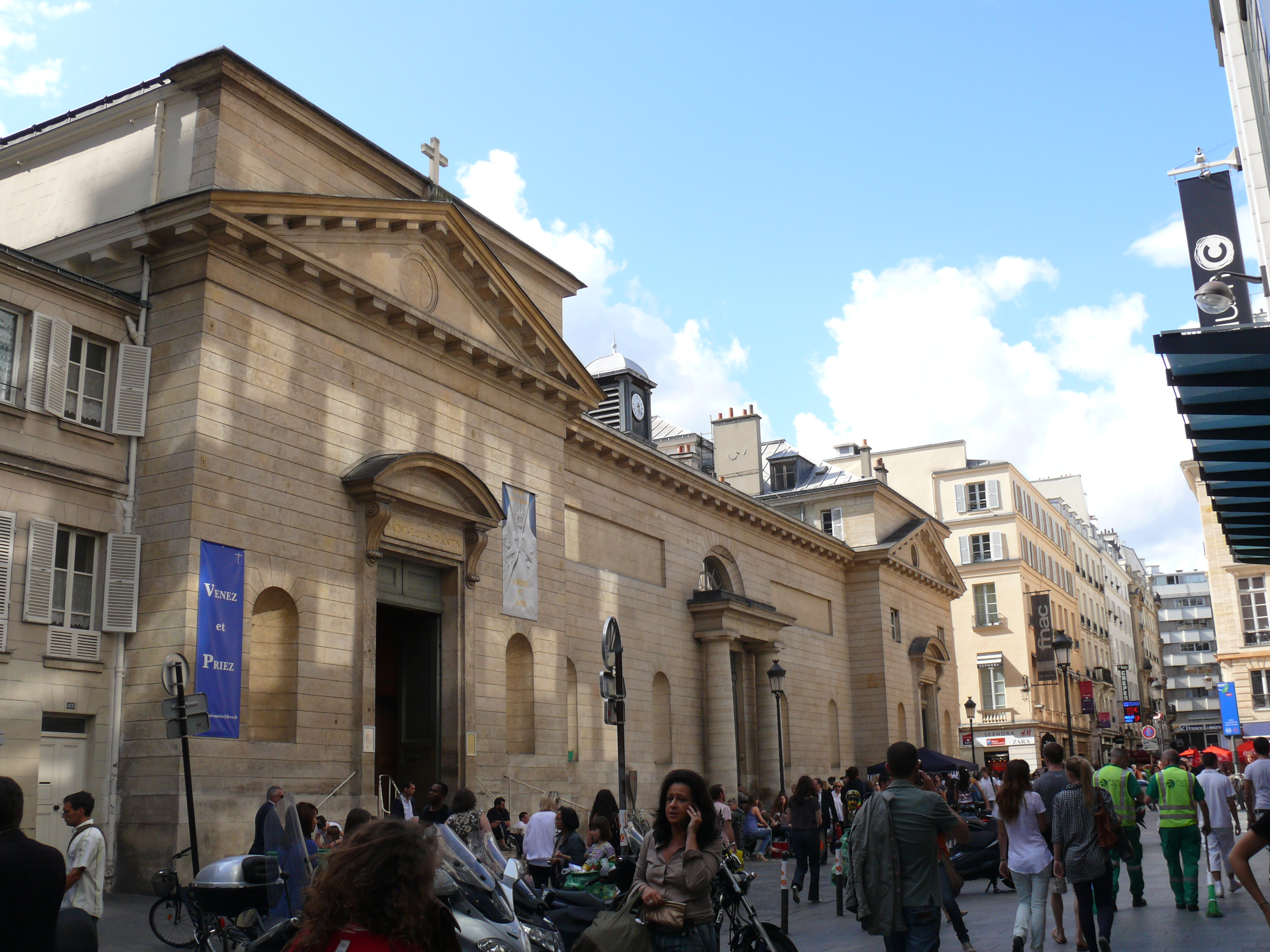
Rue de Caumartin, site of Méric's death (pictured in 2009)

A sale of Ben Sherman and Fred Perry apparel – popular with both extreme groups – was taking place on the Rue de Caumartin in the 9th arrondissement of Paris. The far-left group verbally provoked the far-right group and waited outside the store for 40 minutes, before the fight that led to Méric's death. Neither Méric nor Morillo were involved in the initial verbal confrontation, having both been called as reinforcements. Two security guards said that they prevented Méric from entering the store to fight the skinheads, and told him to refrain from violence, especially against physically larger men; the security guards also told the skinheads to exit to the right to avoid meeting the left-wing group, which was ignored. Only six seconds elapsed between the two groups meeting each other outside, and Méric falling to the floor.

Later in June 2013, security footage from Paris's RATP Group public transit agency showed Méric hitting Morillo in the back. Morillo then turned around and punched him once in the face, leading to Méric’s death. Although there is no video evidence, some bystanders stated Morillo was armed with brass knuckles, which would have been illegal regardless of context. The video was seen but not shown by RTL Group, who disputed a reconstruction by France 2 which showed Méric striking a passive Morillo; RTL's report said that Morillo was fighting two other men at the time that Méric approached him.

== Trials ==
The Paris prosecutor wanted to charge Morillo with murder, but the investigating judge rejected this and instead charged him with manslaughter. A contentious issue in the trial was whether Morillo was armed with brass knuckles, as the accused's own text messages and witness statements supported that he was, while the autopsy was inconclusive. Brass knuckles are legally sold to adults in France, but their use in this case would prove that Morillo and supplier Dufour had prepared to commit violence.

In September 2018, Morillo was found guilty of manslaughter and Dufour of supplying brass knuckles, while a third man was acquitted of violence to other people. Morillo was sentenced to 11 years in prison and Dufour to seven. Morillo was imprisoned for only 55 days before he appealed and was released on licence. Dufour was also released on appeal in January 2019, ahead of an appeals trial in Évry in December of that year. The appeal trial was postponed due to a public transport strike and then the COVID-19 pandemic. In June 2021, Morillo was sentenced to 8 years and Dufour to 5.

== Reactions ==
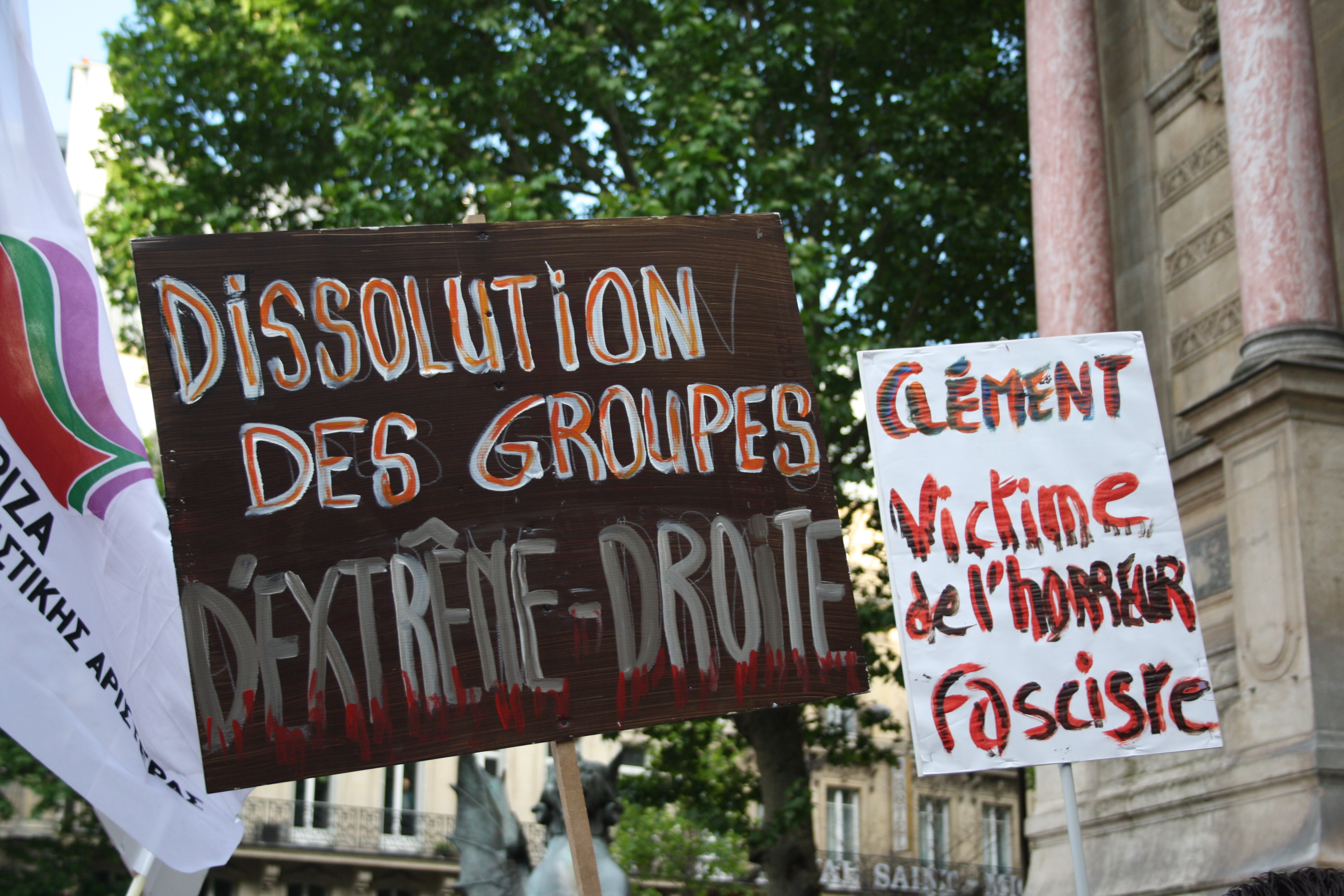
Rally in memory of Méric in Paris on 6 June 2013. The signs say "dissolve far-right groups" and "Clément victim of fascist horror".

President François Hollande and prime minister Jean-Marc Ayrault condemned the death of Méric and pledged to stop the far right. Marine Le Pen, leader of the Front National, condemned the death and distanced her party from it. Three far-right groups linked to those who killed Méric, including two headed by Serge Ayoub, were proscribed by the French government. Government minister Najat Vallaud-Belkacem criticised national media for granting interviews with Ayoub after the death. Rallies in memory of Méric took place across France, and on subsequent anniversaries of his death.
