= Les Ramoneurs de menhirs =

French Celtic punk band

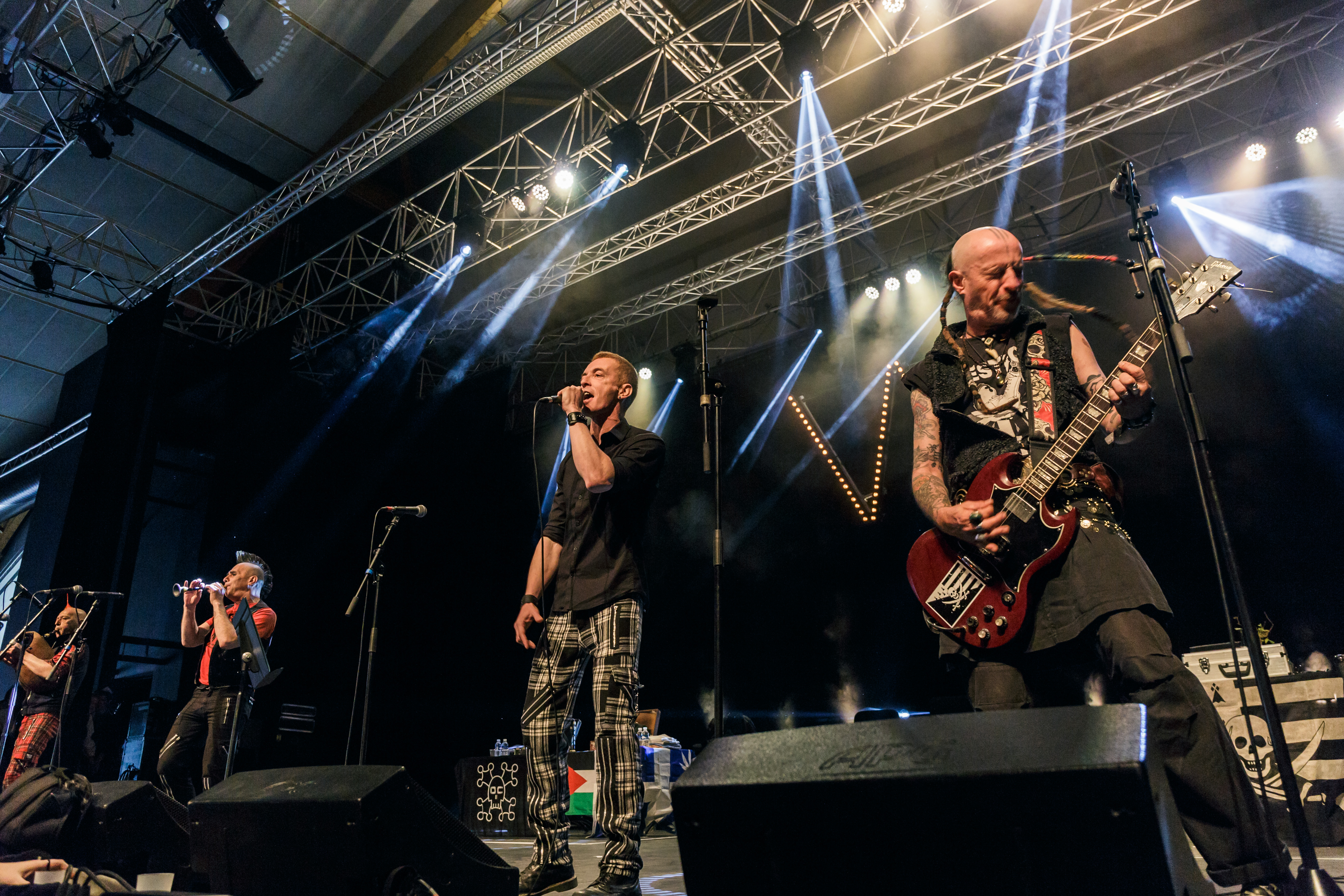
- Les Ramoneurs de menhirs in 2017

Background information
- Origin: Brittany, France
- Genres: Celtic rock; punk rock; music of Brittany
- Years active: 2006-present
- Labels: Coop Breizh
- Members: Loran (electric guitar); Éric Gorce (bombard); Richard Bévillon (binioù kozh); Gwenaël Kere (lead vocalist)
- Past members: Maurice Jouanno
- Website: ramoneursdemenhirs.bzh

Les Ramoneurs de menhirs are a Breton Celtic punk group formed in 2006. Its members include Éric Gorce on the bombardon, Richard Bévillon on the bagpipes, the traditional vannetais singer Gwenaël Kere and Loran, guitarist from the group Bérurier Noir. They play concerts at fest noz as well as normal rock concerts. Most of their songs are sung in the Breton language.

== Biography ==
The group formed in 2006 after Bévillon and Gorce invited Louise Ebrel, Maurice Jouanno and the ex-Bérurier Noir Loran on their album of traditional Breton music Kerne Izel, released on Coop Breizh. Their first album, Dañs an Diaoul (Dance of the Devil) was released in 2006 by the former label of Bérurier Noir, Folklore de la zone mondiale. The singer Louise Ebrel, daughter of Eugénie Goadec, a famous traditional Breton musician, is a guest on the album.

Les Ramoneurs de menhirs participated at the Festival Interceltique de Lorient in 2007, having performed outside the official programme. They also played at the BetiZFest. From January 2008, they went on tour in Europe (Scotland, France, Switzerland). During their tour in Scotland, they opened for the Scottish Celtic punk group Oi Polloi along with Na Gathan. In April 2008, the group won the category "Best Musical Group" at the competition Kan Ar Bobl.

In April 2010, they released a second album before Maurice Jouanno left the group, replaced by singer Gwenaël Kere. On 7 July, they released a new album, Tan ar bobl (Fire of the People). The group performed at the Hellfest on 21 June 2015, and in 2017 with Bagad Kemperle.

== Band members ==
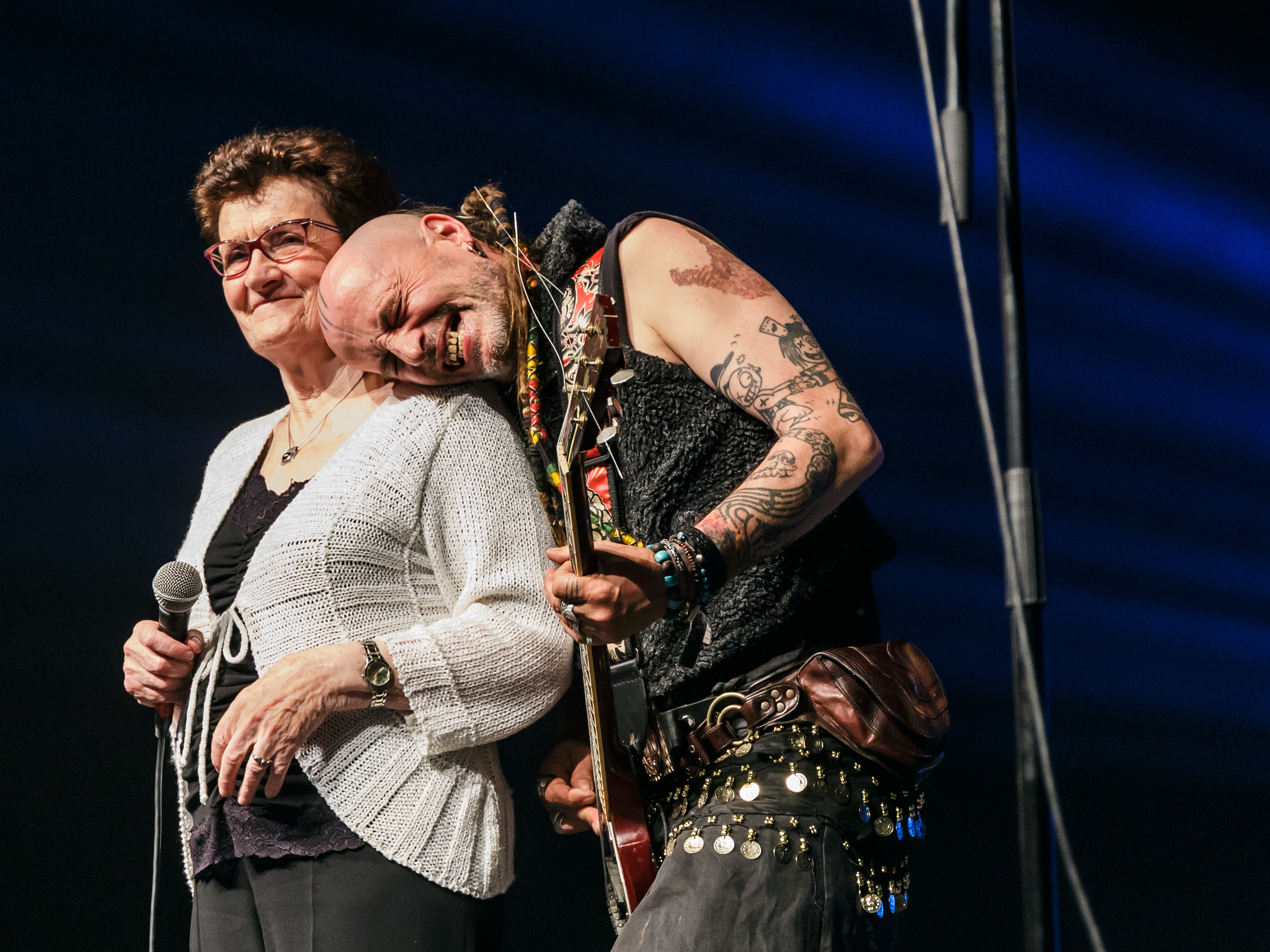
Louise Ebrel and Loran in 2017

=== Current members ===
- Loran: lead guitar, backing vocals, drum machine (2006 – present)
- Éric Gorce: bombard, biniou kozh, backing vocals (2006 – present)
- Richard Bévillon: biniou kozh, bombarde, backing vocals (2006 – present)
- Gwenaël Kere: lead vocals (2014 – present)

=== Guest ===
- Louise Ebrel: lead vocals (2006–2020)

=== Past member ===
- Maurice Jouanno dit "Momo": lead vocals (2006–2014)
Members (current and past)

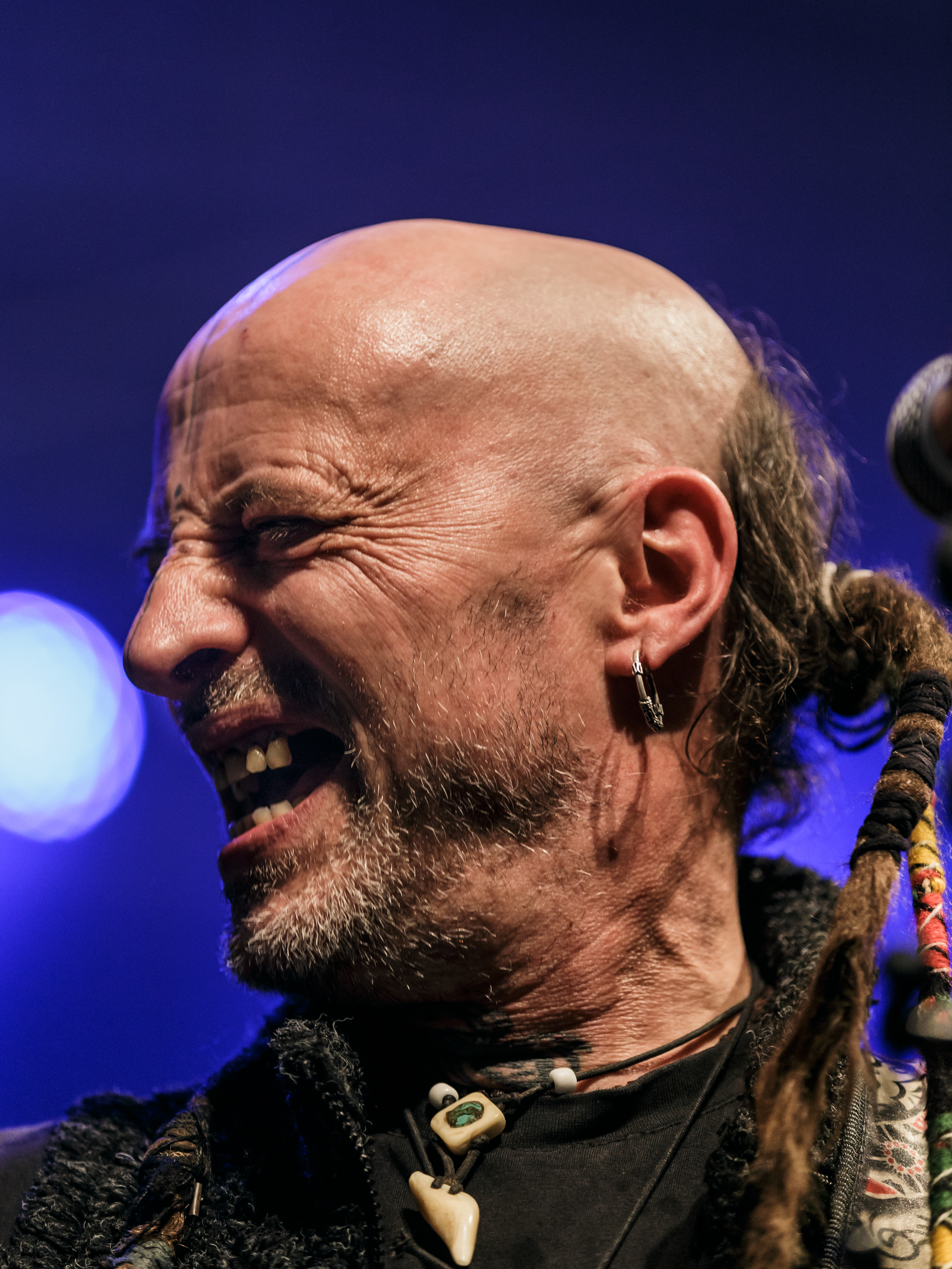
Loran

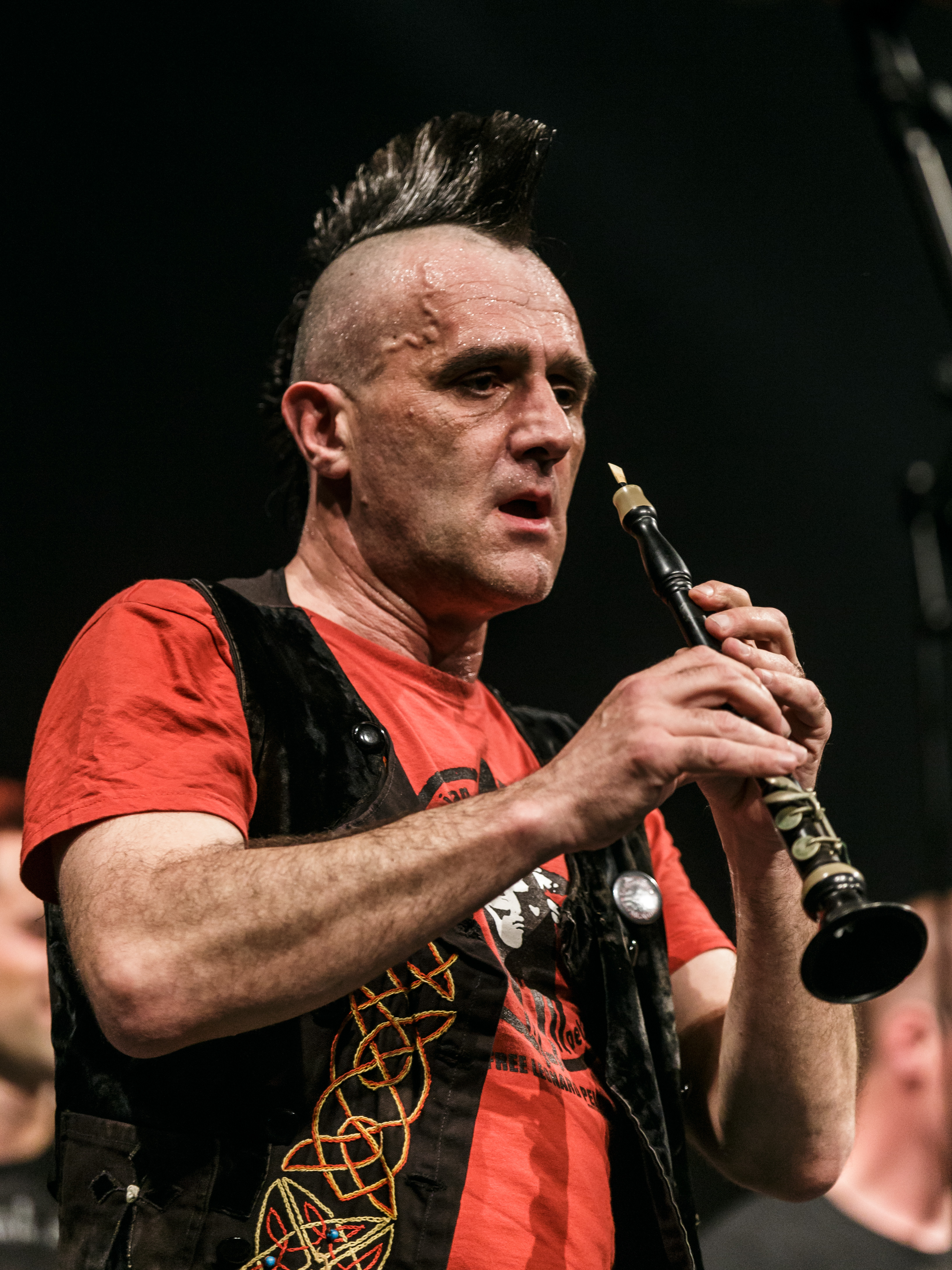
Éric Gorce

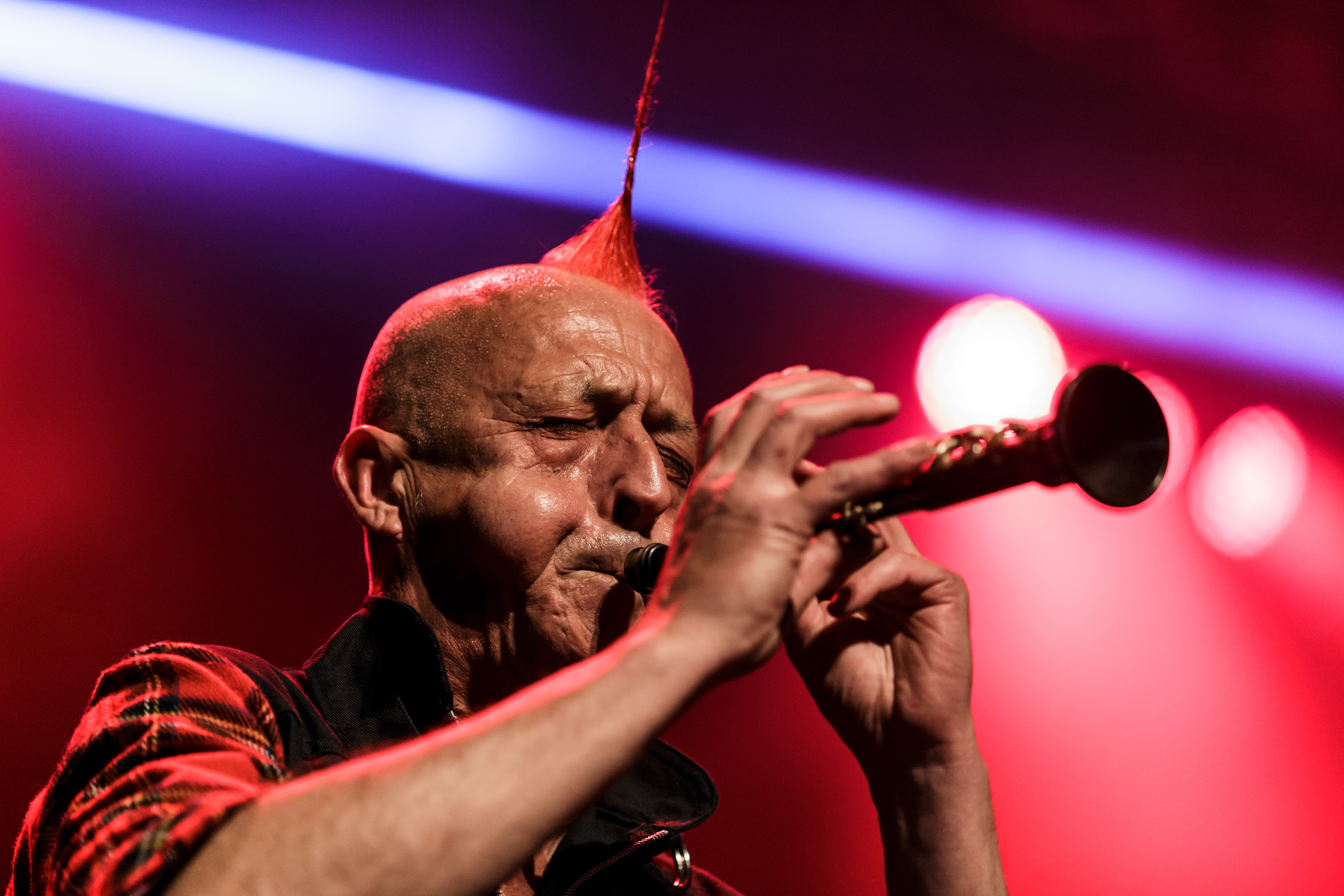
Richard Bévillon

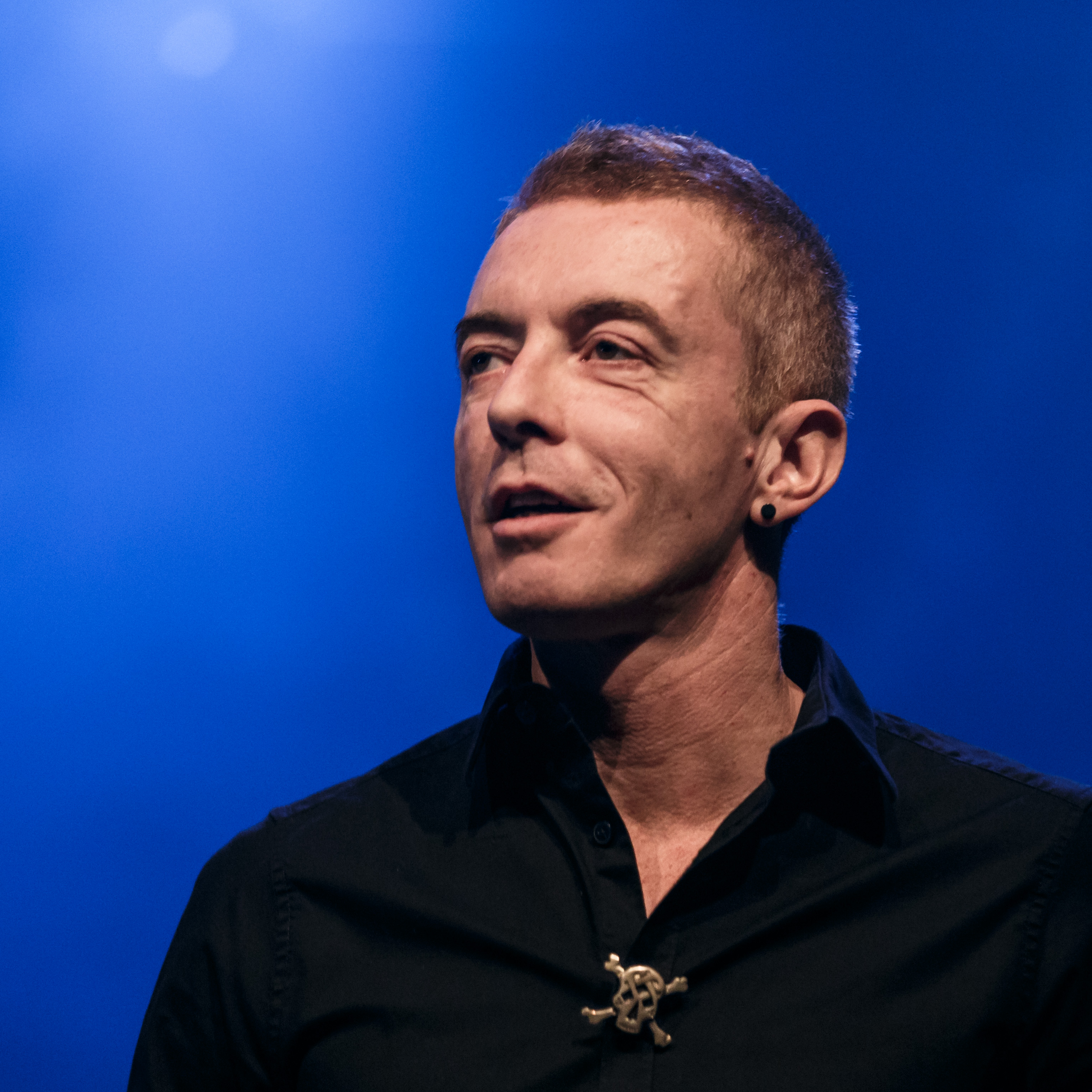
Gwenaël Kere

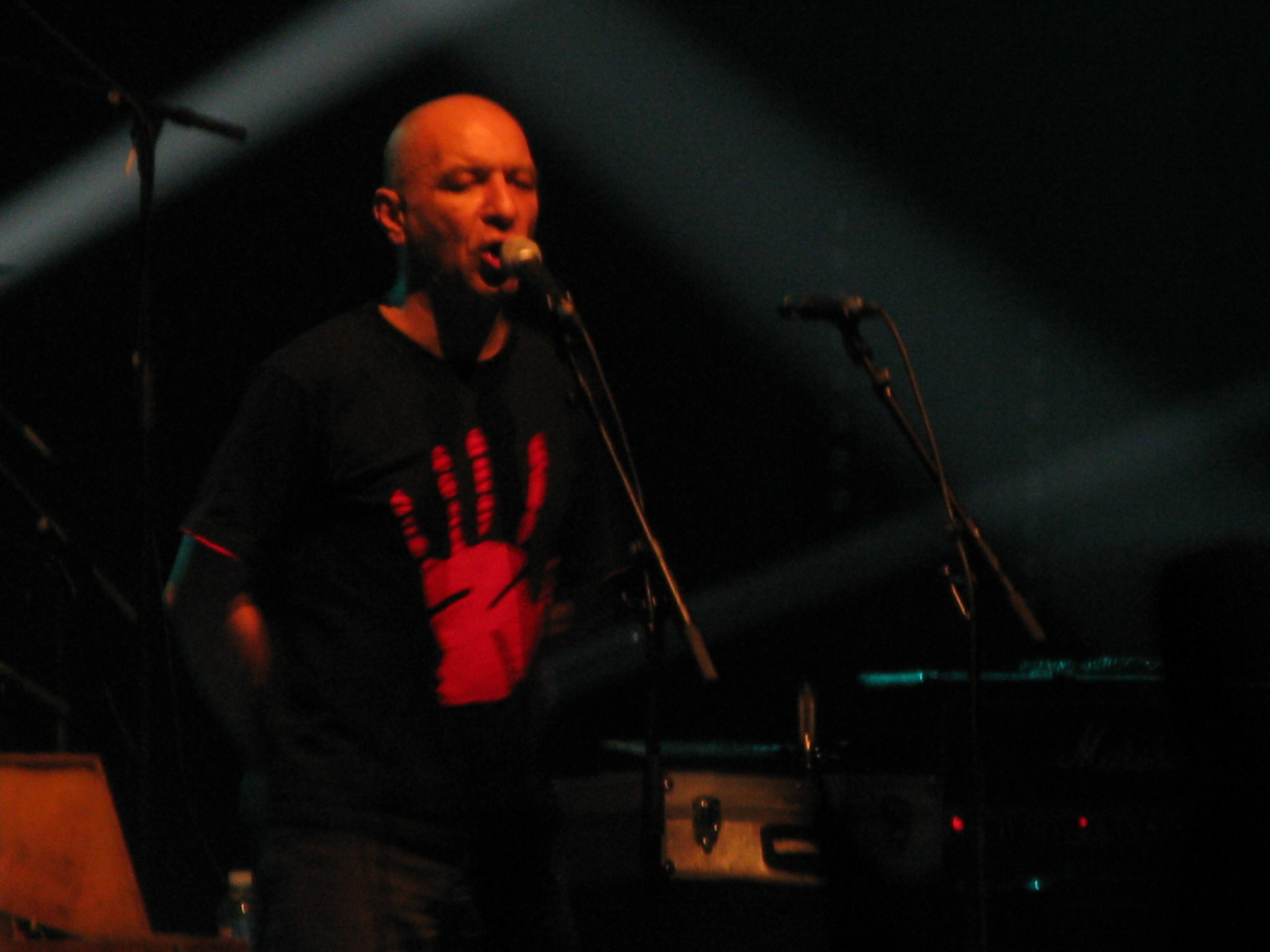
Maurice Jouanno

== Discography ==
=== LP ===
- Four songs – compiled on the CD Concerto pour détraqués (Bérurier Noir with Éric Gorce on the bagpipes and Jean-Pierre Beauvais on the bombardon in the song "Vive le feu".

=== CD ===
- 2006: Kerne Izel, Coop Breizh (Bévillon and Gorce accompanied by Louise Ebrel, Maurice Jouanno (traditional singer from Vannes) and by Loran, guitarist of the group Bérurier Noir, for the songs "Gavotte d'honneur Bigouden" and "Yaw ha yaw ha yaw".
- 2007: Dañs an Diaoul
1. K.A (3:34)
2. BellARB (5:24)
3. Dañs Gwadek 1 (Plinn) (4:03)
4. Yaw Ha Yaw Ha Yaw (An Dro) (3:34)
5. Nomades (2:47)
6. Edan Ur Blez (Laridé) (5:41)
7. Na Gast Na Matezh (Gavotte Pourlet) (3:31)
8. Captain Kirk (2:39)
9. Dañs Gwadek 2 (Plinn) (4:29)
10. Vive Le Feu (6:01)
11. 'Vel Un Tour-Tan (Gavotte d'honneur) (3:54)
- 2010: Amzer an dispac'h
1. Unnek Gwezh
2. Oy! Oy! Oy!
3. La Blanche Hermine
4. Menez Unan
5. Tamm Kreiz
6. Menez Daou
7. If the Kids ar United
8. Marijanig
9. Ya'at'eeh
10. Auschwitz planète
11. Breizhistañs
- 2014: Tan ar Bobl
1. Son Ar Gewier
2. Ni Veway
3. Ar We'enn-Avalow
4. Ibrahim
5. Exarhia
6. Pussy Riotal
7. Hir Ew Geniñ
8. Azawad Dieub
9. Viva La Revolution
10. Makhnovtchina
11. Ar Paotr Disoursi

=== Vinyl ===
- 2008: Dañs an Diaoul (certain songs changed from the CD)

Side A:

1. Gavotte Bigouden
2. K.A.
3. Dans Gwadek 1
4. Gavotte d'honneur
5. Nomades

Side B:

1. Yaw Ha Yaw Ha Yaw Ha
2. Edan ur blez
3. Dans Gwadek 2
4. Bal Plinn
5. Bell'ARB
