= Fedwa Misk =

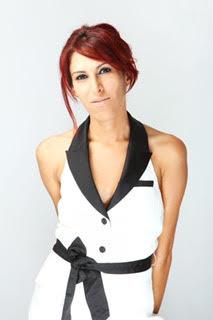
- Occupation: Journalist
- Known for: Founding Qandisha

Fedwa Misk is a Moroccan writer, former journalist, feminist, and women's rights activist. She participated in the 2011 February 20 Movement and subsequently opened an online magazine with the aim of promoting discussion about women in Morocco. Misk's publication Qandisha featured several high-profile stories and was targeted by hackers twice. She has been working as a writer for many newspapers and broadcaster of Diwane, a literary radio programme. In 2021, she published "Nos mères" (Our mothers), a play about transmission between women and its impact on feminism.

== Career ==
Misk attended six years of medical school and has worked as a freelance writer for Moroccan and foreign newspapers. As a journalist, she has been employed by the Le Courrier de l'Atlas newspaper focusing on articles about cultural events, interviews and portrait pieces. Misk also runs a literary café. In 2011, she participated in demonstrations by the February 20 Movement during the Arab Spring against corruption, lack of freedom and injustice by the Moroccan regime. She has been blogging for many years. She is an atheist.

=== Qandisha ===
On 14 November 2011, Misk founded the Qandisha website, a French-language online collaborative magazine inspired by what she believed was a lack of media support for improvements to the rights of women following the Arab Spring. The magazine was named after the mythical Qandisa, a female Jinn famous for her powers of seduction. Qandisha covered topics of relevance to women such as their families and husbands, religion, secularism and the wearing of the veil. Misk's aim was to demonstrate that women were interested in subjects broader than the fashion, beauty, and cooking items featured in other women's publications. She was the magazine's moderator, coordinator and editor-in-chief of the publication which was issued daily. More than 80 people worked for the magazine in some form within its first year, including several dozen writers. By 2015 it had 100 female volunteers and 20 male. In a jocular fashion, any article written by a man is simply credited to "un homme" (a man). Misk wanted to spread the message of Qandisha to a wider audience by beginning radio broadcasts and opening a web-based radio station.

The magazine frequently covers contentious topics including that of a Moroccan politician who was acquitted of rape, despite the victim subsequently giving birth to what she said was his baby. The scandal caused by Qandisha's coverage of the story led to the case being reopened and a retrial being scheduled. A 2012 story on a rape case demanded that the minister for justice repeal a law allowing a rapist to marry his victim. In 2011, Qandisha elicited a formal apology from the French consul general in Casablanca after it revealed a young woman had been rudely treated by its staff.

The site has been targeted by its opponents. Misk frequently receives hate mail and threats online. Some of its opponents allege that the site was funded by Israel, the US, or France. In June 2012, the site was hacked and the page changed to show the Moroccan royal emblem and national motto "god, the country and the king". The hacking occurred after Qandisha published a letter about homosexuality written by a gay man. The site was subsequently hacked for a second time.
