= The Valkyrians =

Finnish rocksteady and ska band

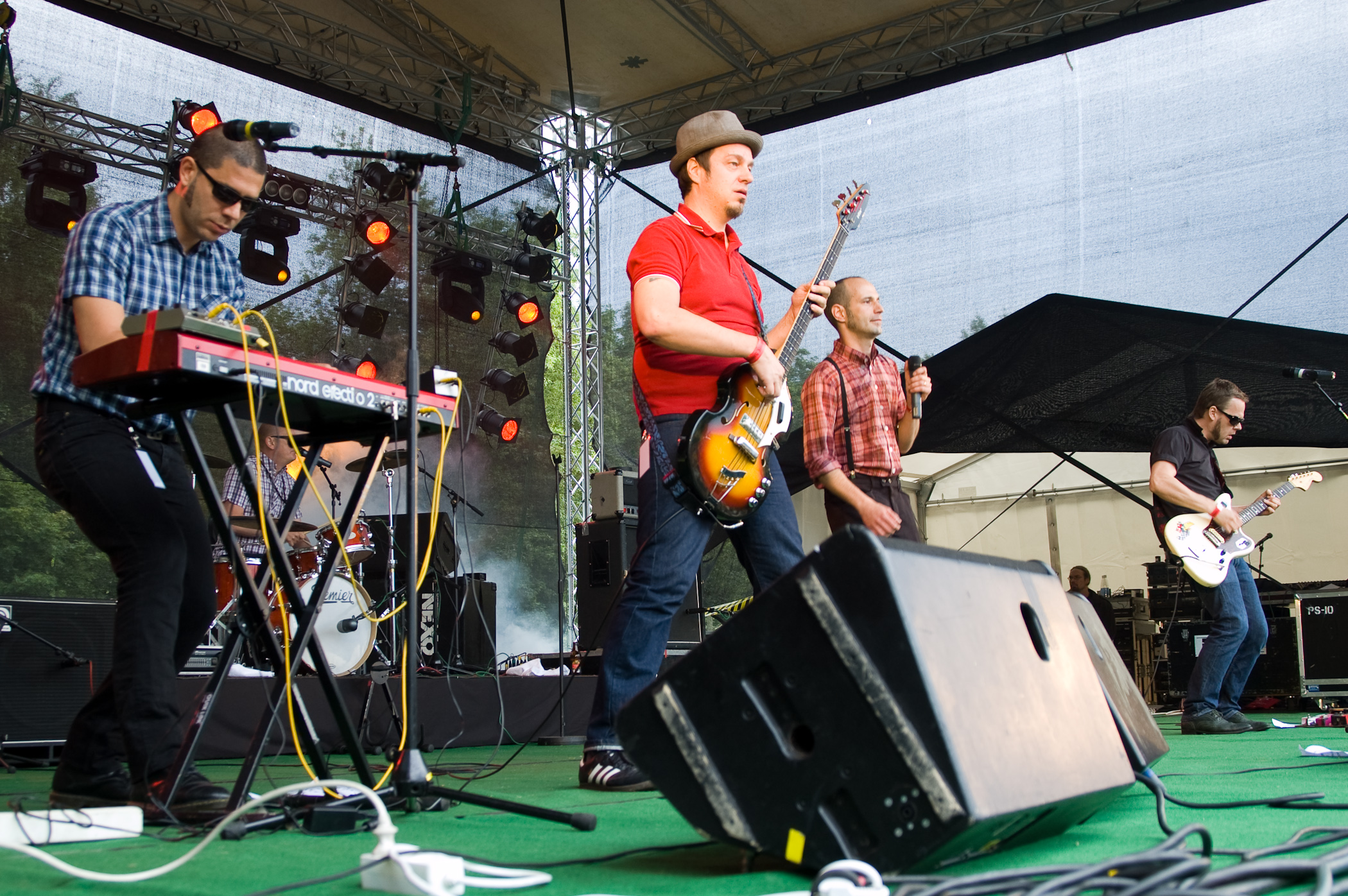
- The Valkyrians performing in 2008

Background information
- Origin: Finland
- Genres: Rocksteady, ska
- Years active: 2002–present
- Members: Angster; John Building; Mr Moonhead; Gladiator; Junior
- Past members: Big Deal; Letku Leroy
- Website: www.thevalkyrians.com

The Valkyrians is a Finnish rocksteady and ska band.

In 2006 they released their debut album High and Mighty, which was popular on the radio and charted at #24 on the national Finnish album chart. One of the album's singles, "Rankin Fullstop", peaked at #6 on the singles chart.

The Valkyrians released a second album, The Beat of Our Street, in 2009. It reached #28 on the album chart.

Their third album Punkrocksteady was released on August 10, 2011. The album's songs are cover versions of the 1970s and 1980s punk and new wave bands' songs and a tribute to the early influencers (outside of ska, and reggae).

== History ==
In 2002, a group of musicians comprising Angster, Moonhead, Big Deal, Letku Leroy, and Gladiator convened at a well-known venue in Helsinki, Finland. Having been acquainted for some time, they collectively resolved to form a band influenced by Jamaican music. Their inaugural performance was arranged by Big Deal and Leroy, who chose their own birthday celebration as the occasion. The band's repertoire encompassed genres such as ska, rocksteady, reggae, as well as 2Tone and punk influences.

In 2004, the band's debut release, an EP titled Miracle, was issued by Semi Sounds/Fat Belt Records. Among its tracks was "I Don't Wanna Go Home," which garnered positive feedback. Subsequently, their album High and Mighty was launched in 2006 under the labels BALE/Fat Belt. Following its release, the band embarked on tours across Scandinavia and central Europe, achieving a peak position of number 24 on the Finnish charts. Their achievements in 2006 included winning the Femma award for Most Danceable Act and receiving recognition from Finland's prominent alternative rock magazine, Rumba. Additionally, their track "Do You Really Wanna Know" was honored as Song of the Year by Funky Elephant.

In 2009, the band's second album, The Beat of Our Street, was jointly released by Stupido Records and Pork Pie Records. The album reached number 29 on the charts. Following its release, the band embarked on an extensive tour lasting nearly a year, with performances in Finland, the Czech Republic, Germany, Austria, Poland, Slovenia, Croatia, the Netherlands, Belgium, and Sweden.

Punkrocksteady was released on August 10, 2011.

== Band members ==
- Angster – vocals
- John Building – bass
- Mr Moonhead – piano, organ
- Gladiator – guitar
- Junior – drums

Former members

- Big Deal – drums (2002–2013)
- Letku Leroy – bass (2002–2018)

== Discography ==
=== Albums ===
- High and Mighty, released February 6, 2006 by BALE Inc. licensed by Pork Pie Records
- The Beat of Our Street, released September 30, 2009 by Stupido Records Oy licensed by Pork Pie Records
- Punkrocksteady, released August 10, 2011 by Stupido Records Oy licensed by Pork Pie Records
- Rock My Soul, released 2015
- Monsterpiece, released 2022

=== Singles ===
- Miracle EP, released October 2004 by Semi Sounds/Fat Belt Records
- Ranking Fullstop, 2006 BALE Inc.
- Do You Really Wanna Know, 2007 BALE Inc.
- Hooligans, 2007 BALE Inc.
- Hold On Rudy, 2010 Stupido Records Oy
- Heart of Glass, 2011 Stupido Records Oy
