= Le Courrier de l'Atlas =

Le Courrier de l'Atlas is a French newspaper specialising in reporting about issues regarding the Maghreb in the Americas, Asia and Europe. Fedwa Misk is one of its main contributors.
