= Klasse Kriminale =

Italian punk rock band

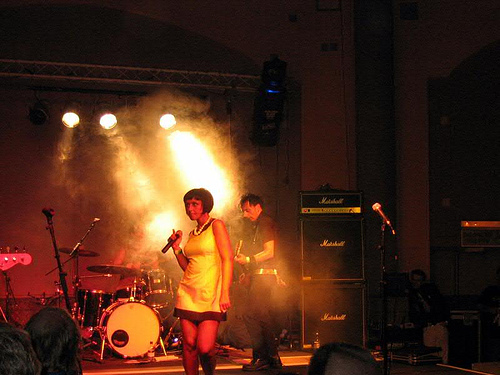
Klasse Kriminale (2007)

Klasse Kriminale is an Italian punk rock band founded in the Liguria region of Italy in 1985. Their sound is a fusion of Oi!, punk, ska and reggae. Their lyrics discuss social issues such as work, unemployment, drugs, media, street life, and generational gaps. Their influences include The Clash, Sham 69, Angelic Upstarts and The Specials.

In 1988, after some line-up changes, Klasse Kriminale recorded their first single. In 1989, they recorded their debut album, Ci Incotreremo Ancora Un Giorno. They have played concerts in Italy, the United Kingdom, Germany, Poland, France, Czech Republic, Canada, and the United States. They have played at anti-racist and anti-fascist events, and at European festivals such as Holidays In The Sun, the Monte Paradiso Belgian Oi! festival, Punk & Disorderly in Berlin, and Rude Boys & Girls UnityAnti-Racist festival in Geneva (Switzerland).

The band's lead singer, Marco, created the fanzine Kriminal Class and has produced the compilation albums Oi! It's A World League, Oi! Against Silvio, Oi! Against Racism and Stay Punk!

== Discography ==
- Odiati & Fieri!(Demo-Tape, 1988)
- Ci Inconteremo Ancora Un Giorno (LP,1989)
- Faccia A Faccia (LP-CD-Tape,1991) [for the sub-label of New Rose, Division Nada, managed by Francois, ex-Bérurier Noir and with Alteau's artwork]
- I Ragazzi Sono Innocenti (LP-CD, 1994)
- 1985-95, Orgoglio Per Le Tue Passioni
- Live/Vivo (CD-LP, 1996) [produced by Paul Chain]
- Ragazzi Come Tu & Me (CD, 1997)
- Mind Invaders [featured by Luther Blissett]
- Electric Caravanas [produced by Jimmy Pursey of Sham 69]
- I Know This Boy [with Riccardo Pedrini, writer and ex-Nabat guitarist]
- Stai Vivendo O Stai Sopravvivendo? (CD, 2001)
- "Welcome To Genoa" (CD, 2002) [one CD with a video-track about the police violence during the G8 in Genoa]
- Klasse Kriminale (CD, 2005) [produced by Vic Ruggiero of The Slackers]
- Strength & Unity (CD, 2007)
- International Soldier (CD, 2008)
- Riot! Are You Ready? (CD, 2009)
- The Rise And Fall Of The Stylish Kids... Oi! Una Storia (CD, 2010)
- Dal vivo in Italia (split LP with Sham 69, limited 500 ex, 2012)

EP's

- Costruito In Italia (EP,1988)
- Ragazzi Come Tu E Me (EP,1990)
- Orgoglio Per Le Tue Passioni (EP-MiniCD, 1995)

Compilations

- The History Of Klasse Kriminale Part1: The Collected Higts 1985-1993 (LP-CD, 1993)
- The Best Of Klasse Kriminale (CD, 1997) [on Captain Oi! Records. They were the first non-English speaking act to appear on this label.]

Collaborations

- Camallo with Jenny Woo (Randale Records) (2014)

Reissues

- Faccia A Faccia (Picture Disc,1996)
- Faccia A Faccia/Ci Incontreremo Ancora Un Giorno (CD, 1996) [Two Original Album On One CD]
- Ci Inconteremo Ancora Un Giorno (LP, 1998) [All songs Re-Mixed]
- Odiati & Fieri! (CD, 1999)

== Current line-up ==
- Marco - Lead Vocals
- Edo - Bass
- JJ - Drums
- Marzio - Guitar
