= Lonsdale (clothing) =

British sports brand

- Genre: Boxing, mixed martial arts
- Founded: 1960; 66 years ago by Bernard Hart
- Products: Sports equipment, clothing, footwear
- Owner: Frasers Group (since 2004)
- Website: lonsdale.com

Lonsdale is a British sports equipment, textile and footwear brand focused on boxing and mixed martial arts established in London in 1960. Former boxer Bernard Hart started the brand as a boxing equipment company, but it eventually branched out into clothing as well. The company is named after Hugh Lowther, 5th Earl of Lonsdale, who, in 1891, set up the first organised boxing matches with gloves, following the deaths of three boxers in bare-knuckle fights. As of 2020, the Lonsdale brand is owned and operated by Sports Direct owner the Frasers Group (formerly "Sports Direct International").

Products commercialised by Lonsdale include gloves, shorts, headguards, shin guards, hand wraps, jockstraps, punching bags, sneakers, and boxing boots. The clothing line is composed of t-shirts, hoodies, jackets, leggings, shorts, and underwear.

== History ==
In 1959, former professional welterweight boxer Bernard Hart was granted permission to use the Lonsdale name by James Lowther, 7th Earl of Lonsdale. In 1960, business commenced for the brand at 21 Beak St., Soho, London.

On 25 March 2010, Lonsdale celebrated the 50th anniversary of the brand by holding the Lonsdale Challenge at the Liberty Boxing Gym in Nottingham, England. The event featured Lonsdale-sponsored boxers Carl Froch, James DeGale, and Tony Jeffries in various boxing-related challenges. Mixed martial arts promotion BAMMA announced during mid-July 2012, that they had renewed their partnership deal with Lonsdale as they move to Channel 5 in September.

== Neo-Nazi usage ==
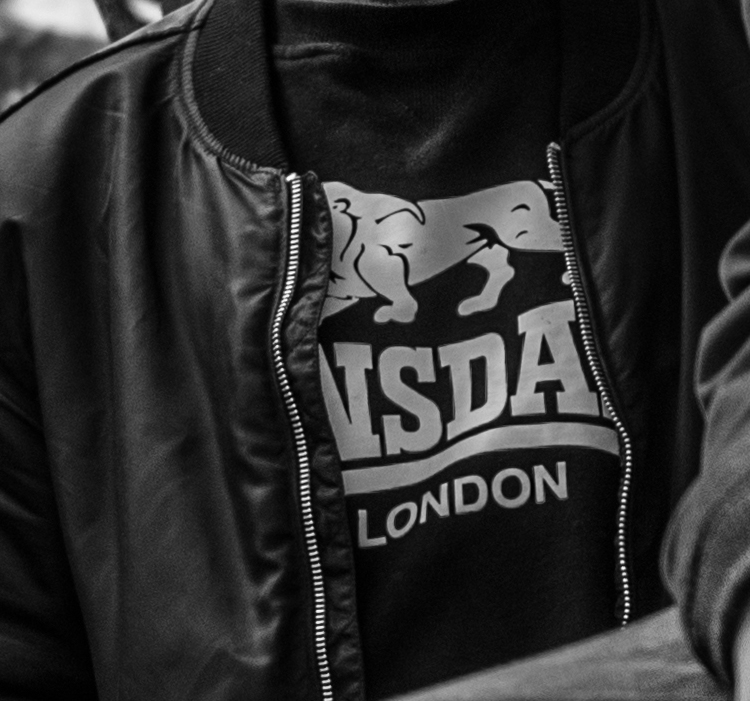
Lonsdale shirts with jackets are popular among neo-Nazis due to the presence of the letters NSDA, one letter short of the Nazi Party's acronym.

In the early 2000s, the brand became popular among some European neo-Nazis, allegedly because a carefully placed outer jacket leaves only the letters NSDA showing; one letter short of NSDAP, the initials of the Nationalsozialistische Deutsche Arbeiterpartei—the Nazi Party. Wearing a brand with no Nazi links to express Nazi sympathies helped bypass strict laws concerning the public display of Nazi symbolism. In the Netherlands, Belgium, northern France, Spain, and Germany, the term Lonsdale youth became widely used to describe teenagers with far right tendencies, and the brand was banned from certain schools in the Netherlands and Germany.

Lonsdale reacted to this trend by sponsoring anti-racist events and campaigns, and by refusing to deliver products to known neo-Nazi retailers. In 2003, the "Lonsdale Loves All Colours" campaign was launched, emphasising non-white fashion models, along with increased support for initiatives that combat racism.

== See also ==
- Lonsdale Belt
- Mixed martial arts clothing
- Nazi chic
