= La Plume noire =

Anarchist bookstore in Lyon, France

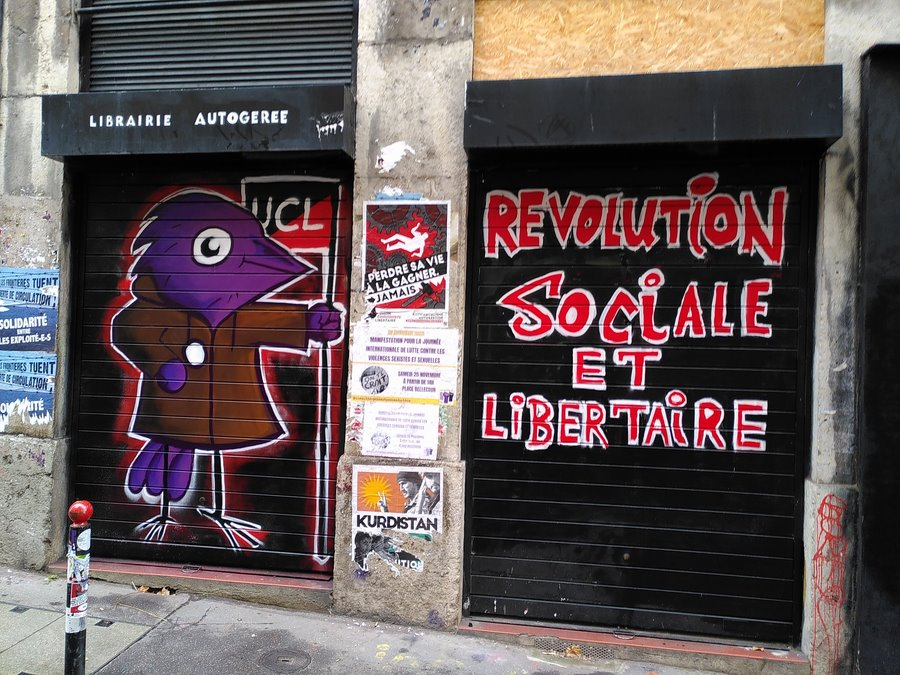
- Front of the bookstore in 2024, comprising a red and black flag
- Founded: 1989; 37 years ago
- Headquarters location: Lyon, France
- Nonfiction topics: Anarchism
- Owners: Francophone Anarchist Federation (FA) (1989-2007); Coordination des groupes anarchistes (CGA) (2007-2019); Union communiste libertaire (UCL) (2019-present)

La Plume noire (English: The Black Feather) is an anarchist bookstore and publishing house located at 8 Rue Diderot in Lyon, France. Frequently targeted by Lyon's far-right movement, it serves as a gathering point for the city's anarchists and anti-fascists.

Founded in 1989 by the Francophone Fédération Anarchiste (FA) in the Croix-Rousse district, the bookstore moved several times during its early years before settling in 1993 into a space it occupied until 2010. In 1997, the bookstore was destroyed by arson following a period of high tension between anarchists and Jean-Marie Le Pen. In 2007, the FA handed over the management of the bookstore to the Coordination des groupes anarchistes (CGA), which later became the Union communiste libertaire (UCL). La Plume noire moved to its current location in 2011. In 2016, it was attacked on the sidelines of a traditionalist Catholic demonstration.

In 2021, the bookstore suffered an attack by the Lyonnese far-right, during which approximately fifty individuals targeted the storefront with iron bars. The nature of this attack, combined with the fact that the assailants faced little interference from authorities and that the case was eventually closed without further action, caused a significant shock within Lyon's far-left circles. Consequently, the Groupe Antifasciste Lyon et Environs (GALE) reportedly began taking more radical action following this event. The bookstore was further vandalized in 2026 following the death of Quentin Deranque.

The bookstore is a landmark of anti-fascism and anarchism in Lyon. It is frequently cited in testimonies by local anarchists an antifascists as a central space for both organizing and political education.

== History ==
=== Foundation and early years (1989–1997) ===
The bookstore La Plume noire was founded by the Francophone Fédération Anarchiste (FA) in 1989. Its initial location was a space used by the anarchist movement throughout the 20th century, situated at 13 Rue Pierre Blanc in the Croix-Rousse district, an area deeply tied to anarchist history since the time of the Canuts and the first wave of the Lyonnais anarchist press (1882–1884). During its first year, the premises were shared with the local anarchist journal Information Réflexion Libertaire (IRL).

The group was forced to vacate the premises the following year after the landlord refused to renew the lease. They moved to 15 Rue Rivet, still within the Croix-Rousse district. Relations with the new landlords were also strained, and the bookstore had to move again in 1993, relocating to 19 Rue Pierre Blanc, just a few doors down from its original site. The lease was signed in July, renovations took place in August, and La Plume noire reopened at this address on 25 September 1993. The Coordination des Groupes Anarchistes (CGA) established itself there during this period.

On 16 February 1997, the bookstore was targeted by a far-right arson attack. This occurred during a period of high tension after Jean-Marie Le Pen began targeting the FA in his speeches and filing lawsuits against Le Monde Libertaire, the organization's newspaper. The fire destroyed nearly all the books and the interior of the shop. A demonstration led by the FA and the Confédération nationale du Travail (CNT) drew 3,000 people on 22 February. Thanks to a significant mobilization effort to restore the space, the bookstore was able to reopen quickly.

=== Establishing a presence in Lyon (1997–2020) ===
In 2007, the FA vacated the premises, leaving the anarchists of the CGA in charge of the location.

After being evicted in June 2010, the bookstore relocated to 8 Rue Diderot in January 2011.

In November 2016, the shop was attacked on the sidelines of a traditionalist Catholic demonstration organized by the Society of Saint Pius X, which had previously been banned by the authorities. Approximately twenty individuals arrived at the bookstore armed with iron bars and stones, subsequently destroying the storefront. The CGA issued a statement highlighting the perceived proximity between the police, who reportedly allowed the banned procession to take place, and the groups responsible for the violence.

In December 2020, two anarchists were violently assaulted in front of the bookstore while organizing a fundraiser to distribute toys to children.

=== 2021 attack ===
On 20 March 2021, La Plume noire was attacked once again, this time by approximately fifty members and affiliates of Génération Identitaire, a neo-fascist group that had been dissolved by authorities just weeks prior. After ransacking the bookstore, the group was left undisturbed in the neighborhood for half an hour without police intervention. French authorities made no arrests and held no trials regarding the incident; the case was eventually dismissed.

The March 2021 attack caused a profound shock within Lyon's anarchist and anti-fascist circles, described by StreetPress as creating a 'climate of terror'. A demonstration planned to protest the attack was banned by the prefecture due to fears of clashes, leading to further criticism accusing the administration of protecting Lyon's far-right movements.

According to Emmanuel Macron, Jean Castex, and Gérald Darmanin, the GALE (an anarchist group in Lyon) reportedly began engaging in more radical actions following this attack as a form of retaliation. This incident was also cited by the lawyer of seven Lyonnese individuals of the GALE arrested for violence during the summer 2021 health pass protests; she argued that her clients felt the impunity enjoyed by far-right movements in Lyon had become intolerable.

Later that year, Adrien R. (known as Adrien Lasalle), a neo-Nazi identified as a member of the group that attacked the bookstore, was arrested for stabbing two young men in the street.

=== Post-COVID France (2022–present) ===
The bookstore was vandalized during far-right demonstrations following the death of Quentin Deranque.

== Legacy and Influence ==
=== Impact on Lyon’s anarchist and anti-fascist movement ===
La Plume noire played a central role in positioning the CGA as a 'pivotal' element of anti-fascism in Lyon. The bookstore is frequently mentioned in activist testimonies documented by Olivier Minot as a primary point of entry and contact for those discovering anarchism and anti-fascism.
