= Collectif Féministes Révolutionnaires =

Collectif Féministes révolutionnaires
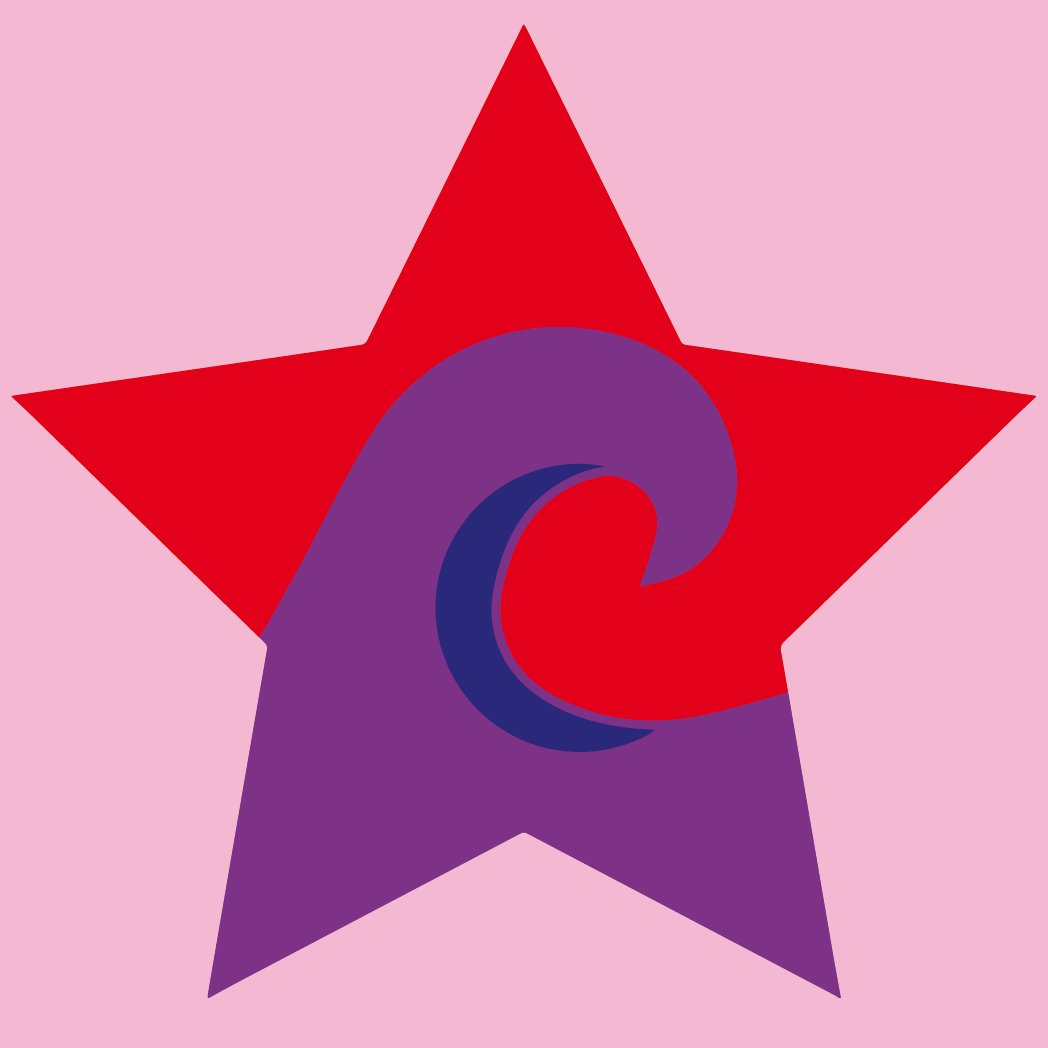
- Logo of the Paris group
- Founded: 2016
- Active regions: Mainly based in Île-de-France, with possible links to other FR groups across France and abroad
- Ideology: Marxist Feminism; Anarcha-feminism; Queer anarchism Anti-fascism
- Political position: Far-left
- Size: At least hundreds

The Collectif Féministes Révolutionnaires (CFR), also known as the Féministes Révolutionnaires of Île-de-France, is a revolutionary feminist, anti-capitalist, anti-racist, queer and more broadly intersectional collective. Founded in Paris in 2016 following the repression of protests against the El Khomri Law, it paved the way for other influenced or similar groups to emerge in its wake.

Since their founding, they have engaged in activism characterized by a diversity of practices, ranging from organizing educational workshops, supporting striking women workers, and creating queer spaces, even assisting in the restoration of a cathedral built by an artist, to participating in more protest-oriented rallies. These include involvements in the Yellow Vests movement and various demonstrations held in coordination with other far-left groups.

Generally speaking, their numbers grew throughout their first decade as they expanded and secured a position within the French far-left. While the organization began as a marginal force upon its founding, by 8 March 2025, it was capable of expelling the Collectif Némésis from the International Women's Day demonstration. This notable event in contemporary French feminist history marked the group's growing influence within the movement.

Their rallies gather between hundreds and thousands of people, and they are credited with significantly contributing to the development of Pink Bloc tactics and the feminist strike movement in France.

== History ==
=== Foundation and early years (2016–2019) ===
The Collectif Féministes Révolutionnaires was born in 2016 following the protests against the El Khomri Law. During this time, many activists met and began organizing collective actions, such as non-mixed general assemblies for women and gender minorities, politicizing together, and exchanging ideas.

Regarding the El Khomri Law, they maintained that the new legislation was detrimental to workers, women, and queer people. Toward the end of 2016, they participated in mobilizations against the proposed abortion ban in Poland; some members chanted: 'Pregnant or aborted, it's our choice'.

In 2017, they took part in the 8 March feminist demonstration, and later, in June, joined the Front Social protests against the policies of Emmanuel Macron.

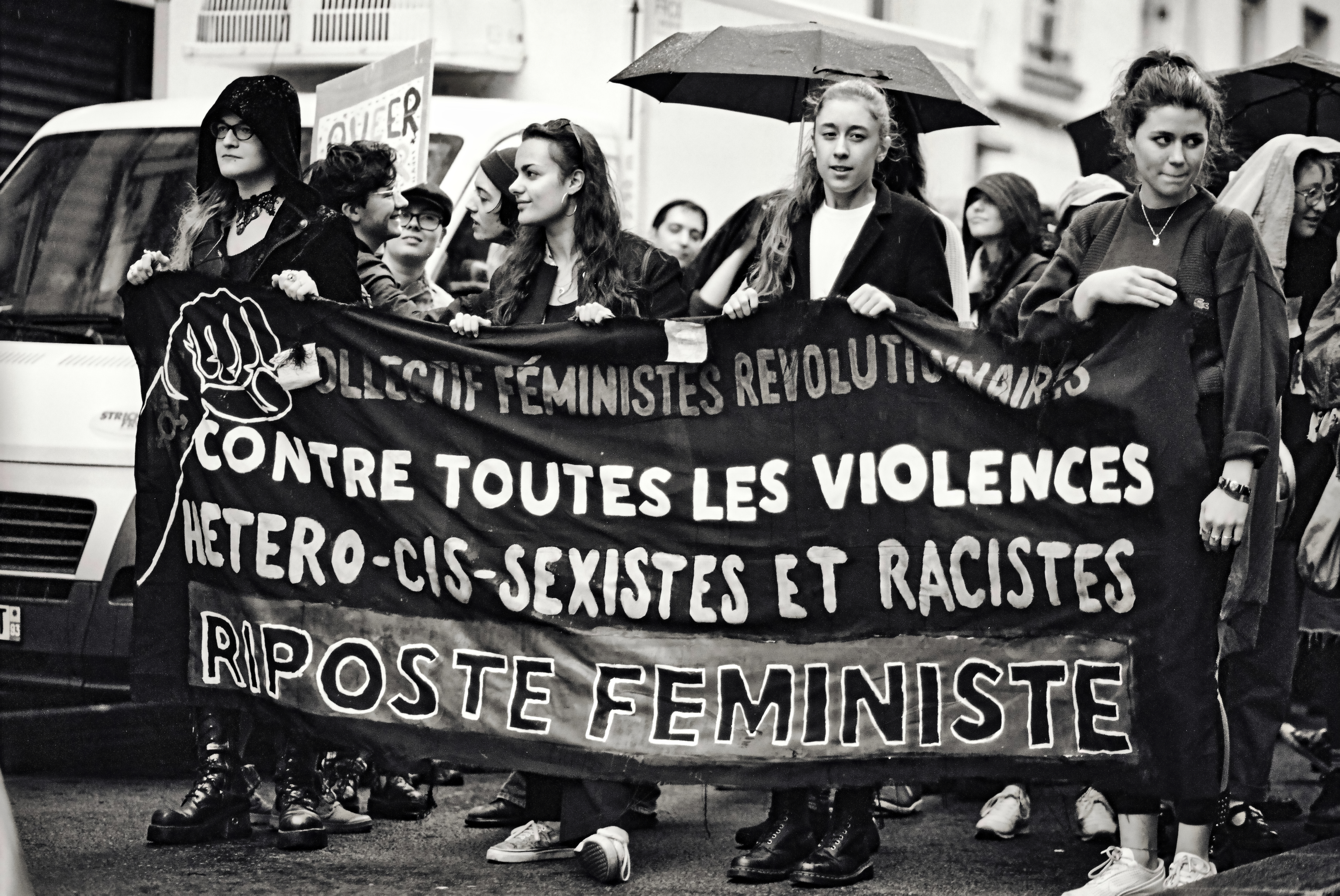
Members of the collective at Existrans in 2017

By 2019, the revolutionary feminists were part of the Yellow Vests movement, where they were sometimes noted at the front of the processions. In June of that same year, they participated in a volunteer day to help restore the cathedral built by the artist Jean Linard in Neuvy-Deux-Clochers.

=== Development and actions (first half of the 2020s) ===
==== 2020 ====
The following year, the revolutionary feminists organized support days for the striking maids of the Ibis Batignolles hotel. During an evening event held with the striking workers, they discussed strategies for assistance and the specific issues affecting them.

==== 2021 ====
Members of the collective participated in the Existrans march in 2017, and in 2021, some joined the Lesbian March on 26 April, which drew over 10,000 people in Paris alone.

==== 2022 ====
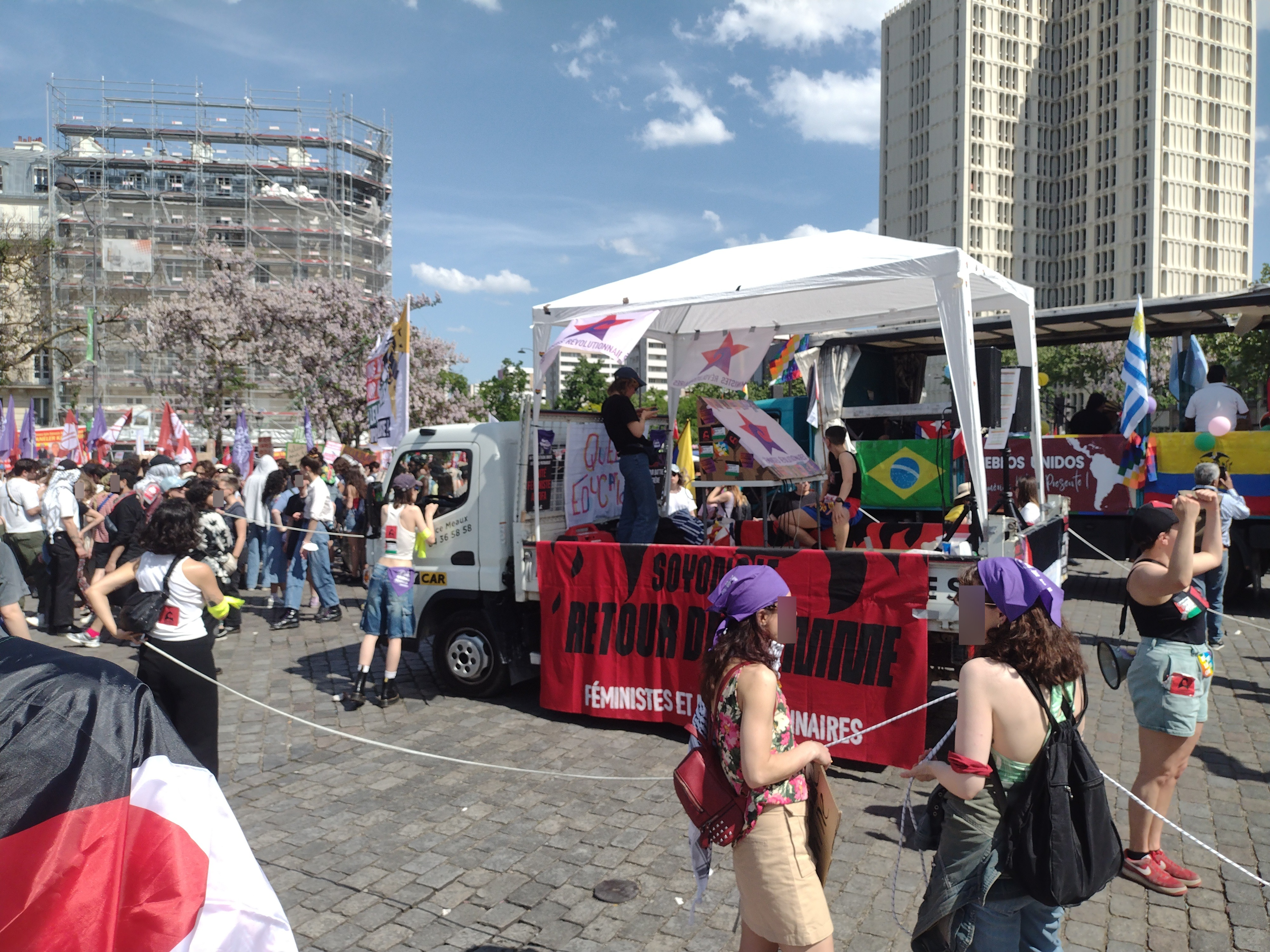
Revolutionary feminist truck and stall, International Workers' Day, 2025

They demonstrated on 8 March in Paris, denouncing the political stance of Emmanuel Macron. According to the collective, Macron presented himself as a supporter of women's causes while failing to take any meaningful action. One revolutionary feminist expressed her frustration to Le Monde, criticizing how security had become the primary focus for all political candidates while women's issues remained overlooked.

In Brussels, protesters echoed their slogans, such as the slogan which rhymes in French: 'The capitalist cis-tem kills, revolutionary feminists in the streets'.

==== 2023 ====
In 2023, the revolutionary feminists participated in International Women's Day once again, as they do every year.

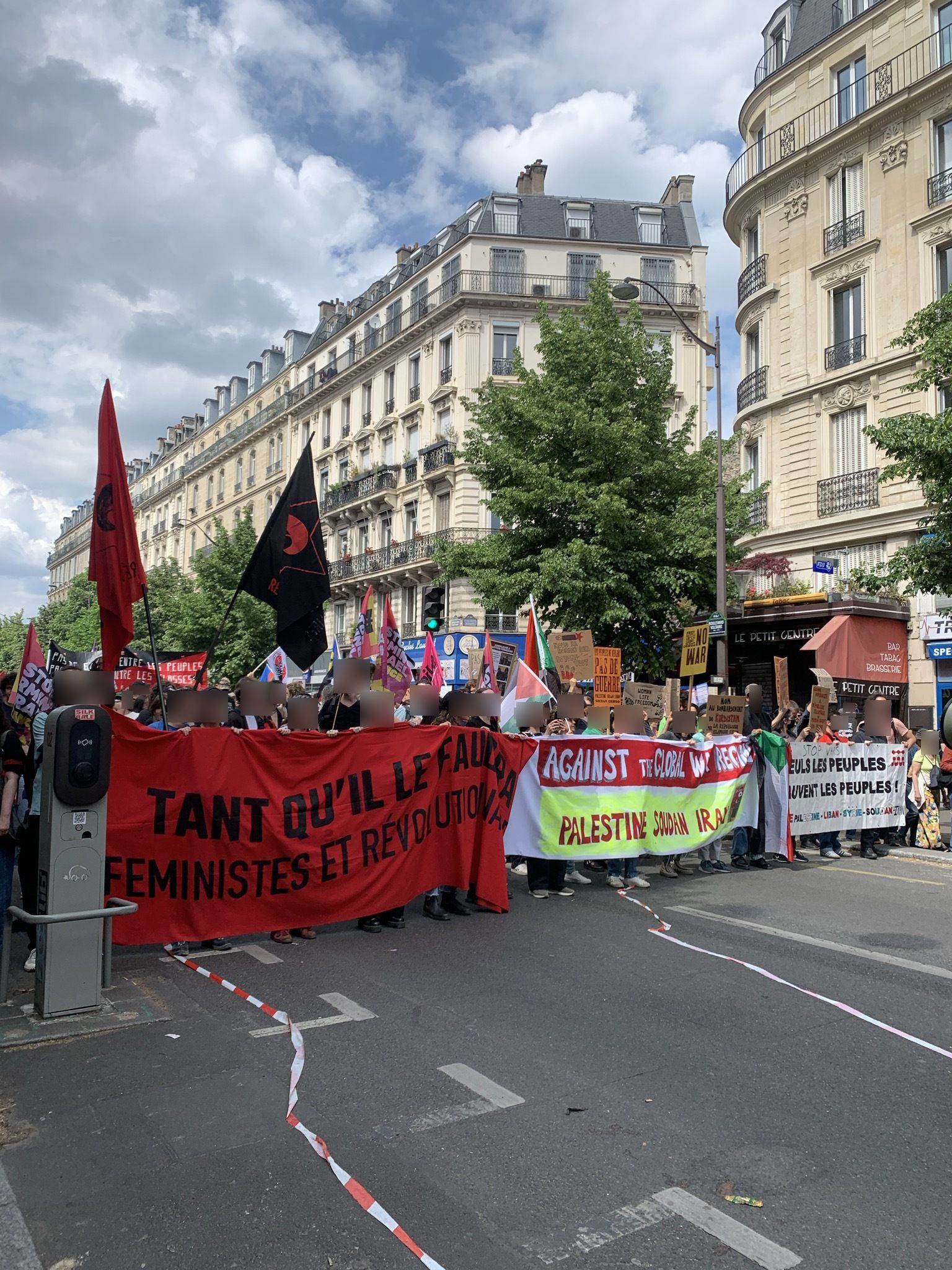
Procession of the Féministes révolutionnaires during 1st May 2026 - the banner reads 'As long as it shall, feminists and revolutionaries'

In November, they took part in the feminist demonstration against gender-related violence. Summarizing their perspective on the situation, they stated:

The Macron government has done nothing to protect victims. On the contrary, their policies encourage [violence] by impoverishing us, which in turn fuels violence.

==== 2024 ====
The following year, in November, the revolutionary feminists led a demonstration against violence toward children and babies, whom they described as the 'great forgotten ones' of social struggles. This protest was organized by the Collectif Enfantiste, with the CFR joining.

==== 2025: Expulsion of Némésis in Paris and mobilizations across France ====
In January, they organized the event Retour de flamme: résistance féministe face à l’extrême droite ('Backlash: Feminist resistance against the far-right'), which brought together over a thousand people and numerous organizations.

During International Women's Day, they clashed with the femonationalist collective Némésis, which seeks to occupy space within feminist demonstrations to gain legitimacy. The CFR categorically refused to march alongside them. They were criticized by Bruno Retailleau, the then-Interior Minister with ties to the far-right, who deployed a security cordon of riot police near the Némésis gathering to protect them should they attempt to join the main feminist march.

As the femonationalist group gathered and attempted to merge with the primary demonstration, the revolutionary feminists refused to let the march begin. They utilized their sound truck to broadcast messages stating: 'This is a message for the attention of all protesters. Far-right activists are attempting to infiltrate the demonstration', declaring they would not move as long as that risk remained. This standoff delayed the march by two hours but ultimately forced the far-right group to turn back due to the hostility of the crowd and their inability to proceed.

In May, they participated in the anti-fascist village organized in Paris.

==== 2026 ====
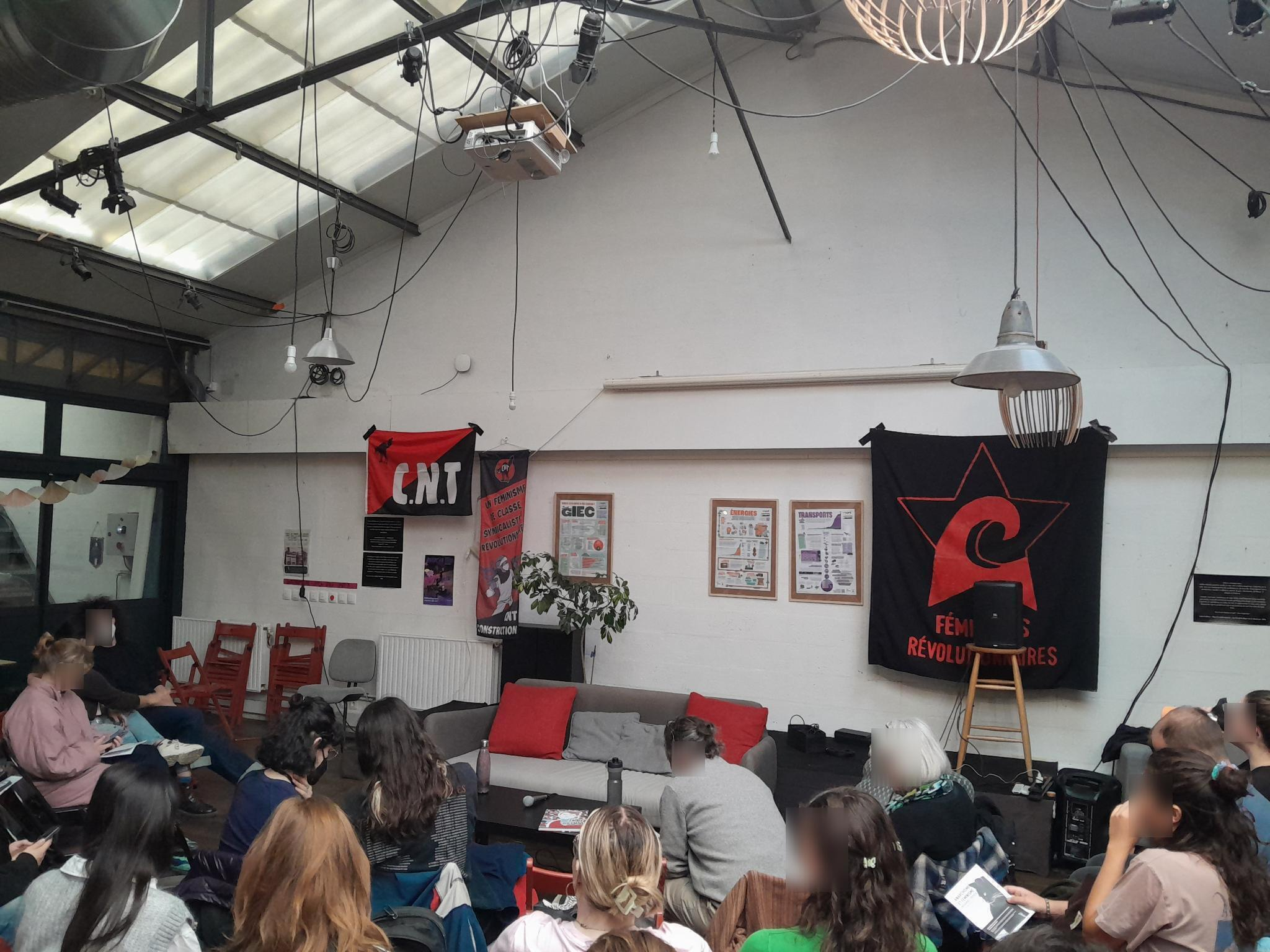
Anarcha-feminist gathering organized by the Féministes révolutionnaires and other organizations; here, a view of the organization's red and black flag (15 April 2026).

In 2026, the organization joined others for International Women's Day, giving the event an anti-colonial and anti-imperialist focus following the war launched against Iran by Donald Trump and the Gaza genocide by Israel.

In April, they organized a gathering dedicated to the history of anarchist women, anarcha-feminism and the figure of Emma Goldman.

=== Other collectives and actions ===
==== Féministes Révolutionnaires de Nantes (2020? – 2025) ====
In 2020, the Féministes Révolutionnaires of Nantes participated in International Women's Day by organizing a meeting with the Tous en Grève ('Everyone on Strike') collective. During this rally, they called for a '24-hour strike from paid labor, domestic chores and care work, an education strike, and a consumption strike'. Later that evening, they held a non-mixed march.

In September, between 300 and 400 people demonstrated in the city streets to demand a 'feminist and social' start to the academic year.

The following month, they protested alongside Nantes Révoltée, SapphoGang, and other local feminist and far-left organizations. This demonstration opposed the mobilizations launched by La Manif pour Tous against the new bioethics law.

In June 2022, the group led 'Defense of Abortion Rights' rallies, and in June 2025, they joined a united front against Pierre-Édouard Stérin, a French billionaire supporting various far-right movements in France.

==== Féministes Révolutionnaires de Poitiers (? – present) ====
In 2025, the Féministes Révolutionnaires de Poitiers (FRAP) organized a demonstration that, according to La Nouvelle République, 'mobilized very heavily'.

==== Féministes Révolutionnaires de Nîmes (2020s) ====
In 2023, in Nîmes, conflicts broke out during the International Women's Day rally. On one side were members of the Confédération nationale du travail (CNT), the primary anarcho-syndicalist organization in France, and independent revolutionary feminists not affiliated with the main collective. These activists, often anarcha-feminists, criticized trade unions for attempting to co-opt the women's movement. On the other side was the inter-union coalition, which sought to maintain control over the demonstration.

Ultimately, the inter-union coalition, outnumbered by the revolutionary feminists, decided to let them take the lead. The gendarmerie commander described them as 'uncontrollable, because they were leaderless'.

== Practices and thought ==
=== Practices ===
==== Horizontal structure and self-management ====
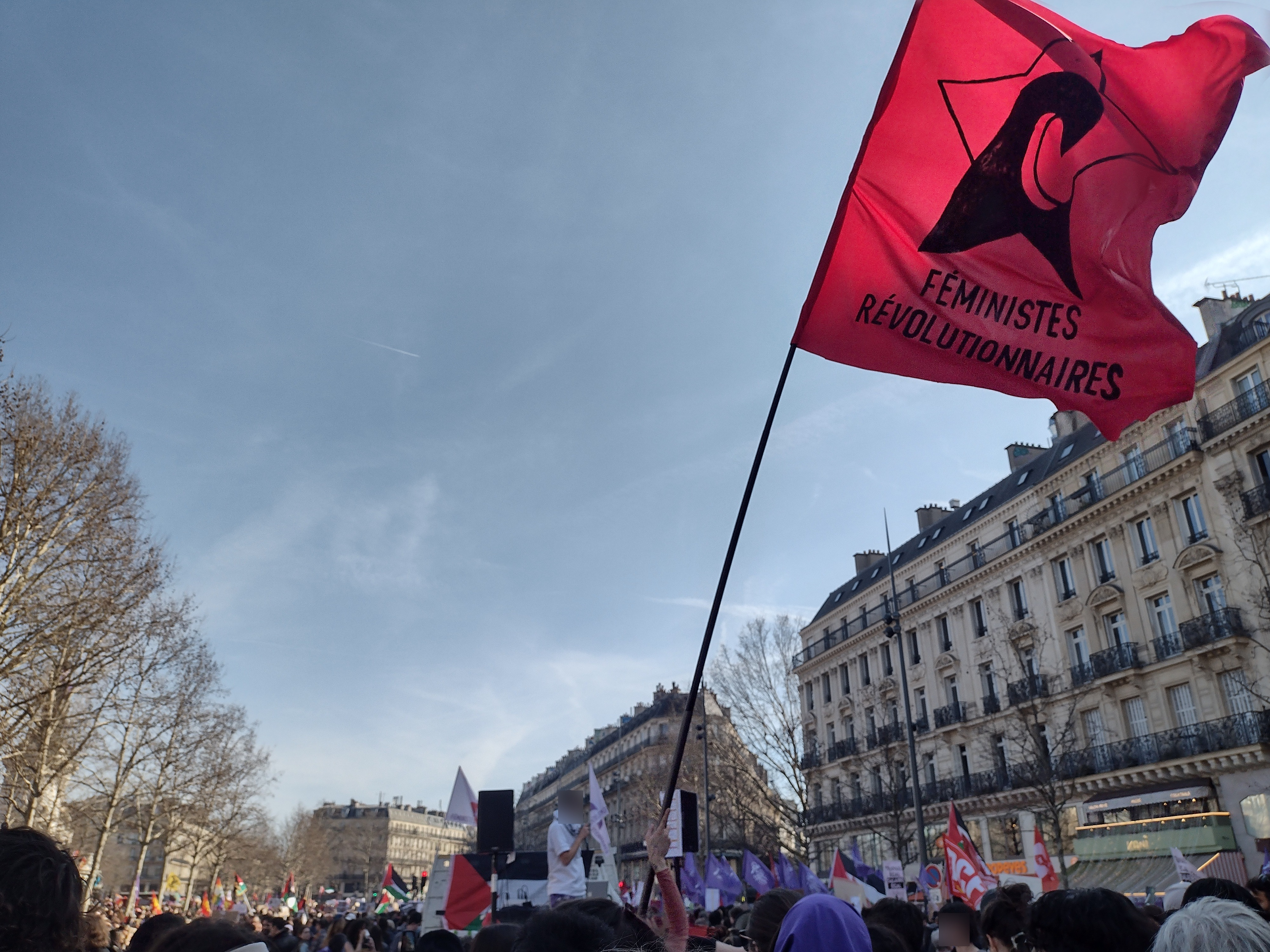
Contingent at the 8 March 2025 demonstration in Paris. Departure from Place de la République.

The organization is characterized by a rejection of the hierarchical nature found in traditional leftist organizations (parties, unions, etc.) and a specific focus on the practice of militant self-management.

==== Support for the feminist strike strategy ====
They extensively reuse and develop the concept and practice of the feminist strike. This involves a work stoppage covering salaried, domestic, and reproductive labor, viewed as an '[immediate] interruption of all power dynamics that subjugate us'.

==== Means of propaganda ====
The collective publishes its own newspaper, titled Tant qu’il le faudra ('As Long as It Takes'). It has been noted for its presence within high schools, universities, and working-class neighborhoods across Île-de-France.

== Thought ==
=== Feminism and anti-capitalism: A model for the CFR’s intersectional thought ===
One of the primary aspects of the CFR, which also explains its origins, is the idea that feminist struggles must not abandon anti-capitalist struggles. The observation made by some of the founders, influenced by Marxist feminism, that many feminist organizations or demands had lost their revolutionary character was indeed a central ideological driver for the collective's creation.

The group's philosophy thus includes a self-critique of certain aspects of the broader feminist movement, particularly its liberal or conservative tendencies.

=== Convergence of struggles ===
Building on this initial materialist and revolutionary orientation that anchors their thought, the revolutionary feminists expand it to include all forms and systems of domination or oppression, a philosophical and political position known as intersectionality or the convergence of struggles. Consequently, the revolutionary feminists define themselves as simultaneously feminist, queer, anti-racist, anti-capitalist, anti-Islamophobic, anti-classist, etc.

== Legacy ==
=== Role in defining boundaries within the feminist movement in France ===
The Féministes Révolutionnaires have been noted by journalist and gender studies researcher Léane Alestra as one of the primary feminist organizations, alongside Kessem and #NousToutes, to actively oppose co-option attempts by the far-right collective Némésis during the first half of the 2020s. This issue was one of the significant political challenges facing the feminist movement in France during this period.

According to Politis, the influence gained by the revolutionary feminists since their founding was demonstrated by their ability, in 2025, to exclude Némésis from the International Women's Day demonstration. Politis noted this as a landmark event marking the definitive exclusion of Némésis from the feminist movement in France; their actions were thus decisive in this notable moment of contemporary French feminism.

=== Influence on the far-left in France ===
According to L'Humanité, the group is fully part of the 'new generation' emerging within far-left movements in the early 21st century, characterized by the strong presence of feminist activists and themes within the far-left. Furthermore, they have been significantly involved in the development and spread of Pink Bloc tactics in France, a strategy inspired by the black bloc, which has been prominent in social struggles since at least the 1999 Seattle protests.

=== Support for organizations targeted by the 'French authoritarian turn' (2017–?) ===
Within the context of the 'French authoritarian turn', a term used by researchers Julien Talpin and Antonio Delfini to describe the period beginning with Macron's first term, characterized by the French state's particularly repressive stance toward far-left associations and groups, the revolutionary feminists have supported several targeted organizations. This state pressure has manifested in the bans (sometimes overturned by courts) of groups such as Nantes Révoltée, Bloc Lorrain, GALE, Soulèvements de la Terre, and Jeune Garde. The CFR notably provided support to organizations like Jeune Garde following their dissolution.

== Bibliography ==
- Bantigny, Ludivine (2025), Nous ne sommes rien, soyons toutes ! Histoire de femmes en lutte et de luttes féministes, de la Révolution à nos jours [We are nothing, let us be everything! A history of women in struggle and feminist struggles, from the Revolution to the present day.] (in French), Paris: Seuil, ISBN 978-2-02-157921-5
