= Bloc Lorrain =

Defunct French anarchist association

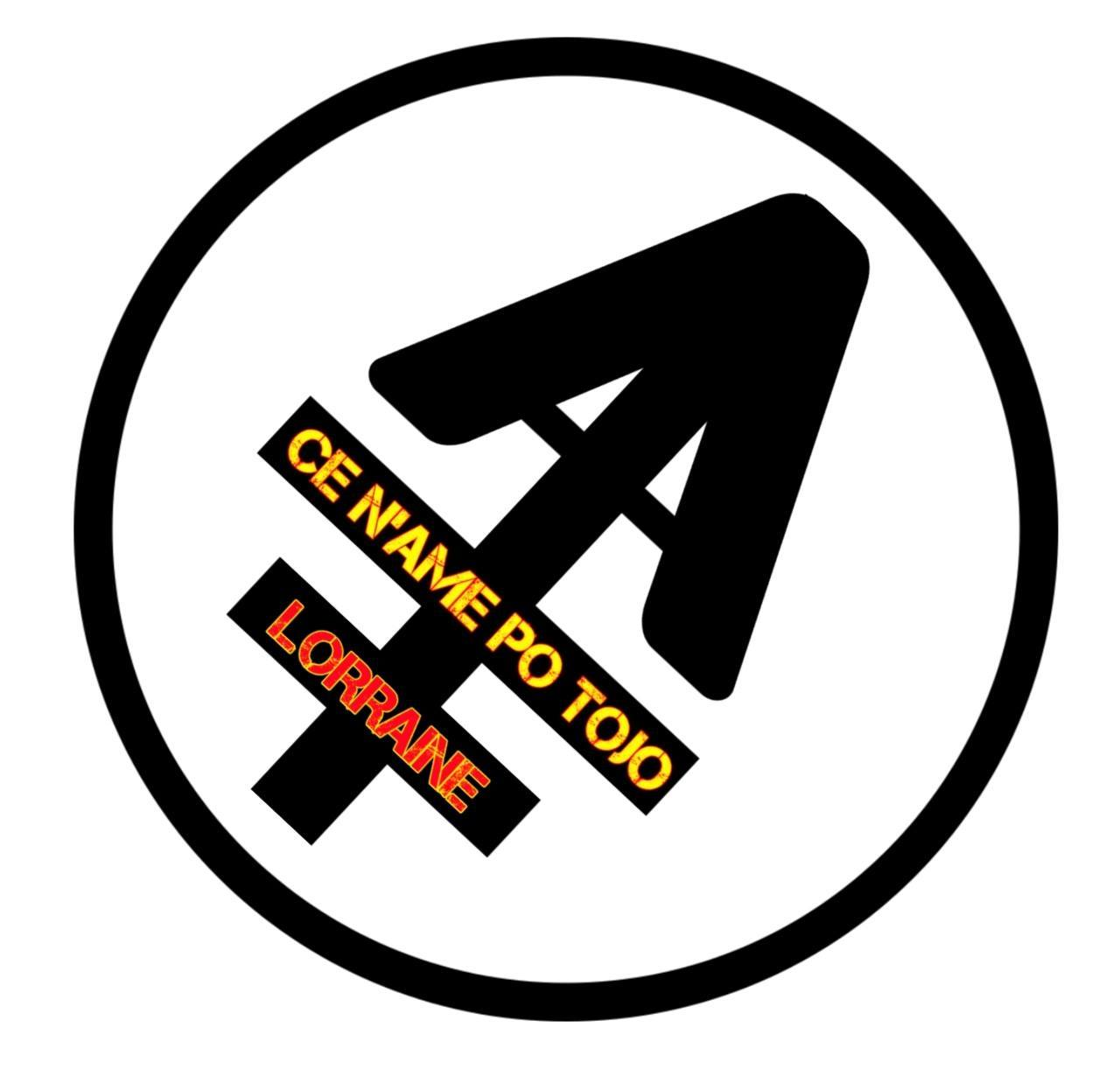
- Logo of the Bloc Lorrain, including a circle-A
- Dates active: March 2021-November 2022
- Active regions: Lorraine region, France; Closely linked geographical areas (Belgium, Luxembourg, Germany)
- Ideology: Anarchism; Autonomist anarchism
- Political position: Far-left
- Size: At least hundreds

The Bloc Lorrain (English: Lorraine Block) was an anarchist association based in Lorraine, France, primarily composed of former members of the Yellow Vests movement. It organized numerous protests, street outreach programs, and political actions until its dissolution in November 2022.

Founded in February–March 2021, the association was involved in both humanitarian activities, such as street outreach, distributing meals to the underprivileged, and aiding refugees (notably those from Ukraine), and the organization of demonstrations and direct action. Among the group's primary struggles, the fight against the health pass during the COVID-19 pandemic and deep ecology were two defining pillars of the Bloc Lorrain's platform. The organization's influence extended beyond Nancy and Lorraine, notably participating in heated protests in Brussels and Luxembourg. Furthermore, it influenced other groups of former Yellow Vests across France, such as the Bloc du centre de la France, an anarchist organization largely inspired by the Bloc Lorrain.

The Bloc Lorrain was dissolved in November 2022 by Gérald Darmanin, within a context where he utilized the new "separatism law" to ban several far-left associations and groups. The Minister accused the association of making extensive use of black bloc tactics. Although the association filed an appeal with the Conseil d’État, the latter confirmed the legality of the dissolution, making it final under French law.

Several researchers consider this dissolution to be a significant marker of the 'authoritarian turn' undertaken by French authorities since 2017.

== History ==
=== Background: Anarchism in Lorraine and the Yellow Vests ===
The anarchist movement has been present in Lorraine since the 19th century, when Charles Gallo founded the first anarchist group in Nancy during the second half of the 1880s.

In 2018, a major protest movement emerged and spread across France: the Yellow Vests. This led to significant demonstrations, clashes, and conflicts between a population in revolt and internal security forces, including the police, gendarmerie, and intelligence services.

=== The Bloc Lorrain ===
Following the waning and repression of the Yellow Vests, the Bloc Lorrain was born from the junction of these two movements; it was an association whose members were both anarchists and, for a large number of them, former Yellow Vests. It was officially registered with the French authorities on 16 March 2021 as an association with the object of:

conducting street outreach and ecological actions such as waste collection or replanting; creating cultural events, demonstrations, shows, and concerts; and selling products to fund these various actions, such as stickers, T-shirts, and other protest-related merchandise.

A few months after its founding, the group already comprised more than a hundred members. It became involved in the protest against the health pass implemented by the French authorities during the COVID-19 pandemic and was noted as being at the forefront of the anti-health pass struggle in Lorraine. Thus, from July of the same year, the Bloc Lorrain began organizing demonstrations in Nancy directed against this measure.

On 10 November 2021, in response to the extension of the health pass in France, about thirty members of the Bloc Lorrain went to the Mont-Saint-Martin border post and blocked traffic on the National Road 52 before being cleared by police forces. A few days later, the mayor of Nancy, Mathieu Klein, filed a complaint because an individual reportedly threatened him with death on the sidelines of a call to demonstrate launched by the Bloc Lorrain on Facebook.

During the winter of 2021, the Bloc Lorrain sent warm clothing to Calais.

In January 2022, various Bloc Lorrain members went to Luxembourg and organized an anti-health pass demonstration there, where a flag featuring a circle A was flown at the head of the procession; this led to various clashes and acts of vandalism in the capital of the Grand Duchy. These actions prompted the conservative and euroskeptic Luxembourgish political party, the Alternative Democratic Reform Party (ADR), which was also opposed to the health pass, to state that it maintained no links with the Bloc Lorrain and opposed its methods. In January, the association requested to meet with the Nancy prefecture and the city hall to discuss the health pass with the authorities, stating they would otherwise continue their activities; this request was denied.

Some members of the Bloc Lorrain were reportedly present during violence at an anti-health pass demonstration held in early 2022 in Brussels, the capital of Belgium. In February, the Bloc Lorrain organized a 'freedom convoy' traveling to Paris to protest against state sanitary measures.

In March 2022, the Bloc Lorrain organized a demonstration on the sidelines of the trial of several BAC officers for harassment and racist insults. According to L'Est Républicain, this trial was indicative of the significant tension in Nancy. It led a police union to complain about the association, claiming it was targeting them; the union spoke out to deny the existence of racism within the French police and maintained that the officers would be Republicans.

In April 2022, the Bloc Lorrain organized a demonstration in Nancy to highlight the social and climate emergency. In May, the group reportedly evaluated the possibility of establishing a ZAD to stop a wind turbine project being carried out in the middle of a forest.

Some members of the association also entered the Émile Huchet coal-fired power station in Saint-Avold, where they displayed anti-coal and anti-nuclear banners.

=== Dissolution (November 2022) ===
As part of the dissolutions initiated in 2022 by Gérald Darmanin against anarchist or far-left groups, such as the Groupe antifasciste Lyon et environs (GALE) or Nantes révoltée, marking the first bans of groups of this nature in France since the terrorist group Action directe in 1982, the Bloc Lorrain was targeted in turn.

The French State sent a communication to the association's president in late October 2022, notifying him of the intent to proceed with the dissolution based on several elements. Some of these were relatively minor, such as the use of a banner supporting the black bloc strategy during a declared demonstration that did not lead to unrest. Furthermore, several accusations listed in the grounds for dissolution had not been subject to judicial proceedings and therefore concerned individuals presumed innocent. The association defended itself by stating they were being targeted for their political opinions, that it was an infringement on freedom of speech, and that their group was peaceful; they maintained that by dissolving them, those who succeeded them would be far more radical.

A demonstration organized in Nancy against this procedure gathered hundreds of people in early November but failed to prevent the dissolution from being pronounced in the Council of Ministers on 23 November. The decree was signed by Emmanuel Macron, Élisabeth Borne, and Gérald Darmanin.

It is estimated that the Bloc Lorrain distributed approximately 20,000 meals during its various outreach programs between its founding and November 2022. In total, according to the association's organizers, they conducted 172 outreach missions and assisted many refugees, particularly Ukrainian refugees fleeing the Russian invasion of Ukraine.

The association announced an appeal before the Conseil d'État, but the latter ultimately decided that the procedure was justified and confirmed the dissolution of the association.

== Legacy ==
=== Repression of the Bloc Lorrain as indicative of an 'authoritarian turn' in France ===
The fact that Darmanin targeted the Bloc Lorrain, GALE, and also Les Soulèvements de la Terre was part of a repressive orientation directed toward groups subscribing to deep ecology. Regarding this repression, researchers Julien Talpin and Antonio Delfini wrote in their work concerning an 'authoritarian turn' initiated in France since 2017:

After the failure to dissolve Nantes révoltée, the Ministry returned to the offensive two months later, targeting the Groupe antifasciste Lyon et environs (GALE) on 20 March 2022. [...] The 1972 law, intended to protect against racial hate speech, now protects the State itself: an overly virulent critique of public authorities can now be passed off as hate speech, even when it targets institutions rather than individuals. Love the Republic or disappear. On 21 October 2022, it was the Bloc Lorrain's turn to be targeted for 'incitement to hatred and violence', specifically directed toward law enforcement.

=== Exportation of the Bloc Lorrain 'model' ===
As early as the beginning of 2022, the Bloc Lorrain influenced other groups across France. This led to the creation of the Bloc du centre de la France, an anarchist organization closely following its methods and actions, also utilizing the black bloc strategy and appealing to the same political imagery.

== Works ==
- Decree of 23 November 2022 on the dissolution of the Bloc Lorrain (in French) by Emmanuel Macron, Élisabeth Borne and Gérald Darmanin

== Bibliography ==
- Bouhey, Vivien (2008), Les Anarchistes contre la République [The Anarchists against the Republic] (in French), Rennes: Presses universitaires de Rennes (PUR)
