= Attack on the CGT security service on 1 May 2021 =

Clash between the black bloc and the CGT in Paris

- Date: 1 May 2021
- Location: Place de la Nation, Paris, France
- Caused by: Accusations of collaboration with police and authorities against reformist trade unions; Clashes over positioning at the front of the May Day demonstration
- Result: Anarchist tactical and strategic victory; Takeover of demonstrations in France by the black bloc

Parties
(France) CGT; Moral support: LFI; CFDT; FO; LREM	Autonomist anarchists Yellow vests Other black bloc members

Lead figures
Philippe Martinez; Jean-Luc Mélenchon (support); Élisabeth Borne (support)	Decentralised and coordinated groups (anarchist egalitarianism)

Casualties and losses
At least 21 injured (4 seriously)	Unknown, probably several 46 arrests

The attack on the CGT security service on 1 May 2021 was a violent clash between the Parisian black bloc, mostly composed of autonomist anarchists and Yellow Vests, and the security service of the General Confederation of Labour (CGT), France's primary trade union. This event was a settling of scores between anarchists and reformist trade unionists, resulting from decades of growing opposition. It concluded with the CGT's defeat on the ground, leaving the union with dozens of injured members, some seriously. The event marked the growing takeover of power by anarchists within the French left and their gradual elimination of opposing factions.

Starting in the 1990s, alongside the collapse of trade unionism in France and the parallel rebirth of the anarchist movement, the latter began attracting more and more young militants, occupying an increasingly important position within the left, aided by the use of a new strategy, the black bloc. Reformist unions, especially the CGT and the CFDT, despite being in sharp demographic and militant decline and increasingly discredited, continued to try to control demonstrations and mobilisations in France, a situation that became untenable over time. From 2016 onwards, these unions, viewed as collaborators with the government and the police, began to be targeted as enemies by anarchists in France.

In 2021, these tensions reached their climax during the attack on the CGT security service by the black bloc at the end of the 1 May demonstration. These highly violent clashes, in which the black bloc was joined by Yellow Vests, led to the CGT's defeat on the ground. Its militants were beaten and violently assaulted, accused among other things of being police accomplices. The CGT, which tried to swiftly extricate itself from the demonstration, was unable to do so, blocked by the police for reasons that remain unclear, and suffered dozens of casualties. It was largely placed in a position of inferiority.

According to some researchers, this situation marked a turning point in the history of the French left, thrusting anarchists to the forefront and casting significant doubt on the reformist model adopted by these trade union organisations. The CGT emerged from the event facing widespread soul-searching, forcing it to realise its weakness and to stop trying to disrupt the black bloc or position itself at the front of demonstrations.

== History ==
=== Context: Rebirth of anarchism, spread of the black bloc, discredit and decline of trade unions in France ===
From May 68 onward, and even more so following the fall of the USSR and the 1990s, the anarchist movement underwent a rebirth in the West. Several factors drove this resurgence, including the evolution of capitalism at the end of the 20th century (offshoring, etc.), the end of state-communist support for Marxist–Leninist parties, and the fact that state-socialist and communist movements were increasingly discredited within the far left. According to historian Spencer Beswick and Marxist historian Max Elbaum, from the late 20th century onward, anarchists began to outpace other far-left currents, 'eclipsing' the influence of Marxist-Leninists on popular demands and struggles.

In France, trade unions were extremely powerful until the 1990s and 2000s. They possessed structured security services that prevented anarchists from taking the lead during demonstrations and served as auxiliaries to the police forces to subdue those wishing to undertake more radical actions. However, this situation evolved during the 1990s and 2000s with a drastic drop in the membership of unions like the CGT or the CFDT, whose reformist strategy appeared increasingly useless to many left-wing militants and who were viewed very negatively by anarchists. The latter, especially following the Battle of Seattle (1999) and the anti-G8 riots in Genoa (2001), developed and spread the black bloc strategy. This strategy appealed more and more to left-wing militants in France, reinforced by the repression implemented by the French state during these years, which convinced an increasing number of activists that peaceful action was useless to fight the state and capitalism. These dynamics were further strengthened by the inability of reformist unions to obtain concessions since the Juppé reform (1995).

Sociologically, the security services of reformist unions or communist organisations were growing older and progressively losing their striking power in France, whereas black blocs gathered more young, prime-aged, and increasingly professional militants each time. However, the CGT, the CFDT, and other groups did not take these evolutions into account and continued to act as if they still held the initiative on the left, a situation that became less and less true on the ground, where they were increasingly overwhelmed.

=== Immediate precursors ===
In 2016, during the passage of the El Khomri law, a first major shift occurred when CFDT offices began to be targeted as collaborators with the French government and capitalism. The Yellow Vests movement, in which anarchists participated, active in 2018 and subsequent years, managed to obtain certain concessions. This reinforced their belief that violent and direct action was the only method capable of bending the government to their will. The situation became increasingly tense on the ground, partly due to the actions of Didier Lallement, a particularly repressive Paris Police Prefect.

In 2019, Philippe Martinez, the leader of the CGT, had to be extricated from the 1 May demonstration; he later declared that this was a reaction to the tear gas deployed by the police.

=== Attack on the CGT security service on 1 May 2021 ===
During the 2021 International Workers' Day, on 1 May, while the CFDT refused to march and called instead for a 'virtual demonstration', the CGT still took part in the protest.

Right from the start of the demonstration, the black bloc attempted to form at the front of the march and was put in difficulty by the police. Initial clashes took place with the CGT, which was trying to advance behind them or even clear them out of the way to position itself at the front with its security service. This was unsuccessful, but the demonstration eventually managed to move forward anyway. A branch of the Société Générale bank was targeted and vandalised during the protest.

Clashes between the black bloc and the CGT resumed when the demonstration arrived at Place de la Nation. There, it was no longer a matter of isolated skirmishes, but rather actual fighting that broke out between the CGT, its security service, and the black bloc. The CGT was targeted as police 'collaborators' and fascists by members of the black bloc, a number of whom also claimed membership in the Yellow Vests. The security service began spraying tear gas at their opponents as particularly violent clashes ensued. One of the union's vehicles was tagged with 'CGT collabo' and its windows were smashed, projectiles flew across the square, and numerous people covered in blood during the fighting had to be exfiltrated.

Overall, the CGT was outnumbered by the black bloc and beaten on the ground. It sought to extricate itself from the demonstration, but its vehicles could not leave because the police blocked them. In total, by the end of the clashes, the CGT reported 21 injured, including several seriously, while the police made 46 arrests.

=== Immediate political, trade union, and police reactions ===
The entire republican political spectrum blamed the black bloc for the clashes, a stance shared by figures ranging from Jean-Luc Mélenchon to Élisabeth Borne, who expressed solidarity with the CGT and accused the bloc. Force Ouvrière (FO) and all the other trade unions adopted the same position. Mélenchon declared, among other things:

In solidarity with the CGT militants attacked by a masked commando. The violence unleashed against the major union highlights the gravity of the event. Where is France heading?

For his part, Martinez accused the police of allowing the events to unfold without stepping in to protect the CGT and of preventing the organisation from extricating itself from the scene. The police prefecture denied this, claiming instead that an agreement had been made beforehand with the CGT to allow it to leave the area, but that the CGT, while 'being targeted by numerous projectiles thrown by a hostile crowd', had taken a different route than planned. Furthermore, they stated that the police officers who attempted to intervene were overwhelmed by the crowd and the bloc, and that one of them was injured in the action.

== Legacy ==
=== A notable event in the shifting balance of power on the left in France ===
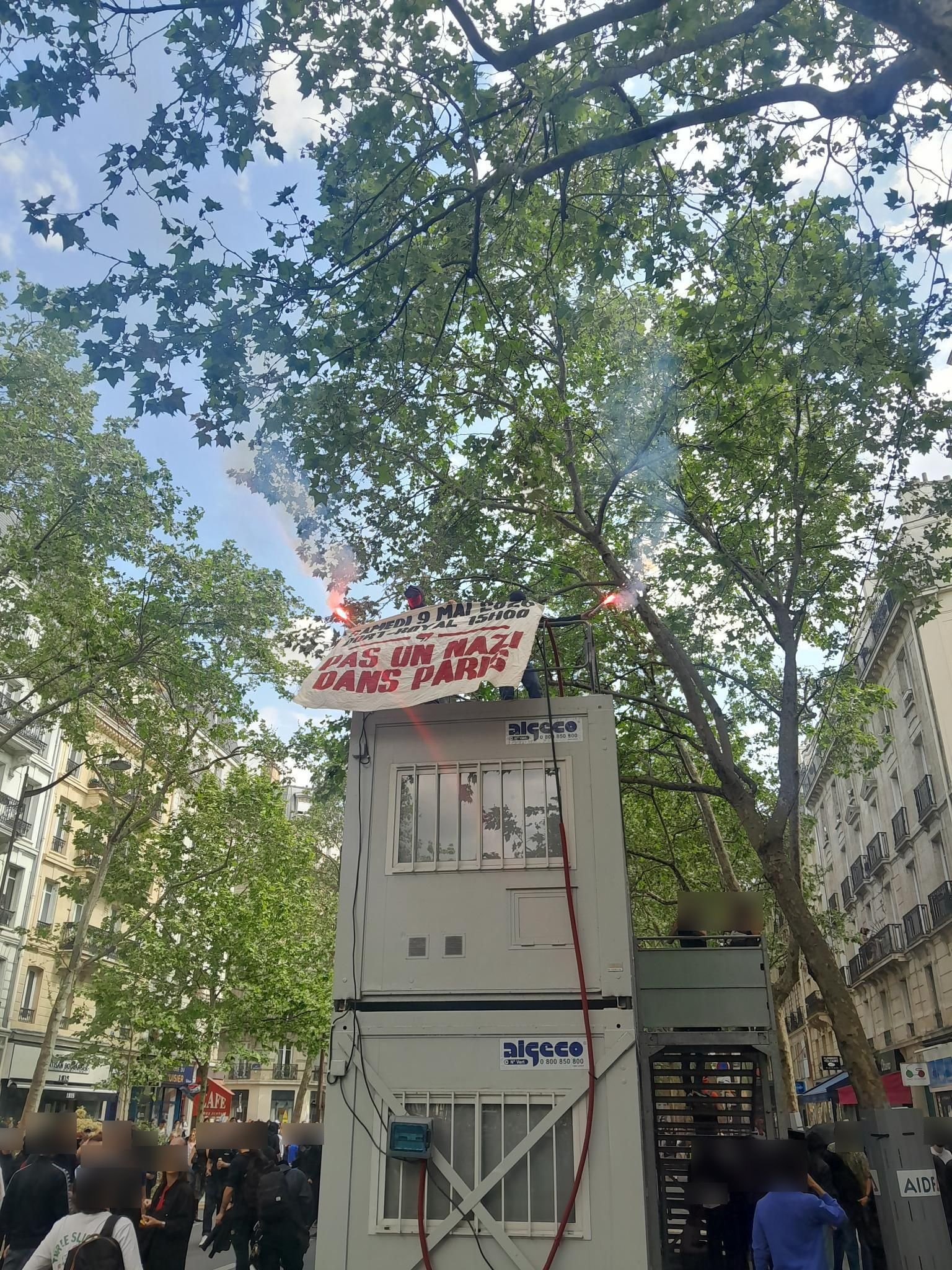
Banner of the AFAPB and the bloc forming at the front of the protest on May Day 2026 in Paris

According to sociologist Isabelle Sommier, a specialist in political violence in France and professor at the Sorbonne, this event marked profound shifts in the balance of power within the French left. From this attack onward, and despite official statements from unions and left-wing politicians, the black bloc and the anarchist movement, which she associated with Bakunin, marked their return to the vanguard of left-wing struggles in France. This event served as evidence of their resurgence since the 1990s and 2000s, accompanied by the gradual elimination of reformist or opposing left-wing forces by these groups.

Thus, following this event, the unions reportedly finally became aware of their weakness on the ground and the impossibility of continuing to view themselves as the guardians of demonstrations. The black bloc established itself as the new and preferred strategy for left-wing youth during protests, causing the unions to step back. Regarding this matter, she stated during a hearing at the French National Assembly:

The CGT security service took time to grasp the shift in the balance of power, particularly regarding the size and quality of their numbers, not to mention the age of the militants and their ability to run. [...] For a long time, this security service continued to look down on anarchist and autonomous groups, viewing their members as greenhorns and bourgeois. It has finally come to terms with its own weakness and now seeks to prevent clashes from affecting their demonstrators. They no longer have the ambition to expel black blocs. Moreover, a portion of the rank-and-file union members does not view the latter in a negative light, considering that traditional demonstrations achieve nothing and that violence is on the side of the police.

== Bibliography ==
- Beswick, Spencer (2022), "From the Ashes of the Old: Anarchism Reborn in a Counterrevolutionary Age (1970s-1990s)", Anarchist Studies, 30 (2): 31–54, doi:10.3898/AS.30.2.02
- Dupuis-Déri, Francis (2019), Les nouveaux anarchistes: De l'altermondialisme au zadisme [The new anarchists: from alter-globalization to zadism] (in French), Paris: Textuel, ISBN 978-2845977501
- Dupuis-Déri, Francis (2016), Communiqués de black blocs [Manifestos of Black Blocs] (PDF) (in French), Paris: Lux, archived from the original (PDF) on 15 July 2020
- Jourdain, Édouard (2023). Géopolitique de l'anarchisme: Vers un nouveau moment libertaire. Paris: Cavalier Bleu. ISBN 979-1031805856.
