= Autonomist anarchists =

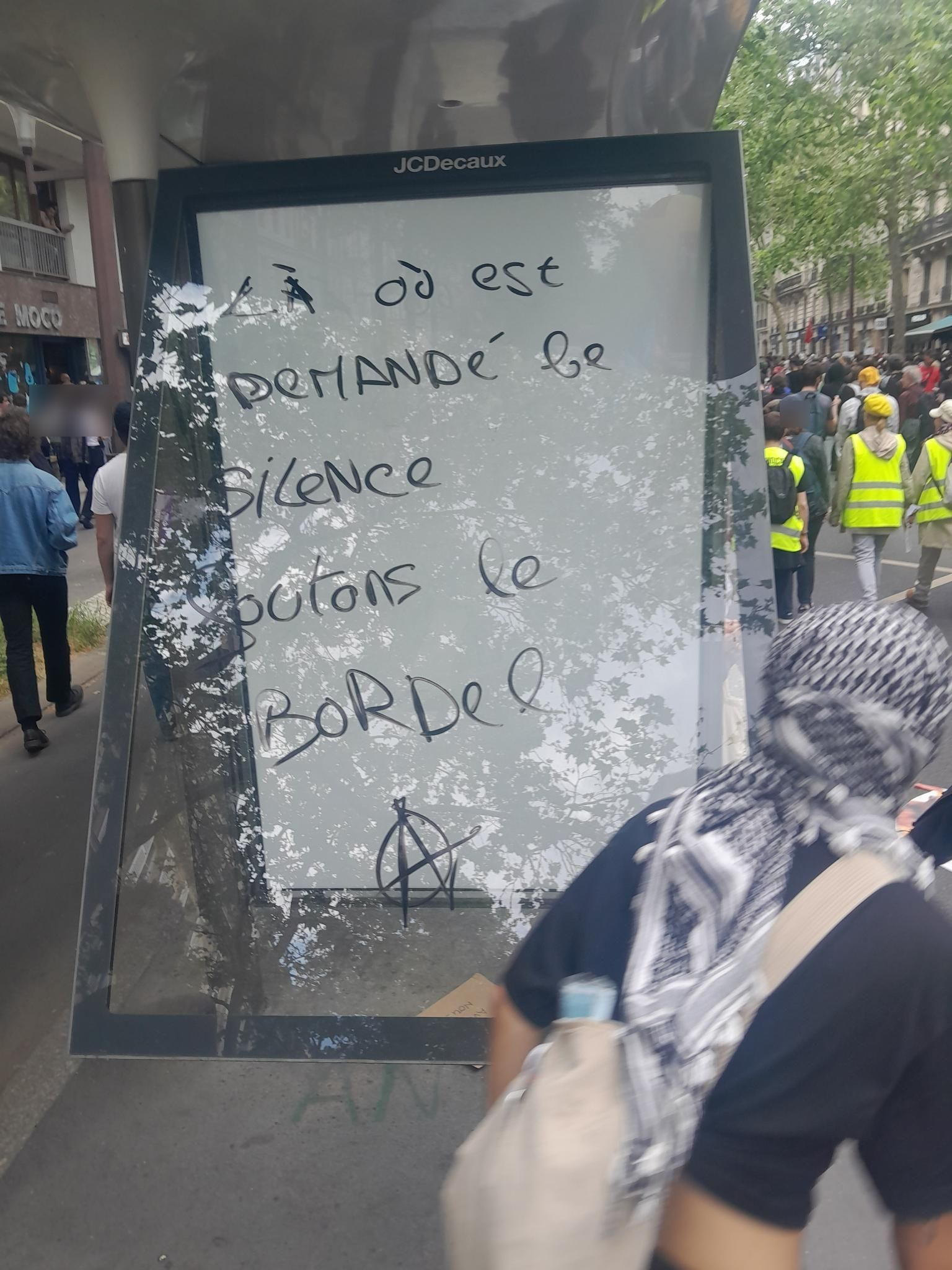
Toto with a keffiyeh after doing an anarchist tag reading 'When they ask for silence, let's make chaos' during May Day 2026

Autonomist anarchists, also known as anarcho-autonomists or totos, are a type of anarchists and autonomists corresponding more or less to the second phase of the history of the autonomist movement (2000–present). They are characterized by their abandonment of the Marxist or communist thought that had marked the earlier generations of autonomists in favor of joining the anarchist movement.

Initially, the autonomist movement was exclusively Marxist, but it evolved progressively toward anarchism, which it rediscovered over the generations. In France and Western Europe, these two movements largely converged starting in the late 1990s, notably through shared strategies such as the black bloc, direct action, the establishment of general assemblies or squats, and their growing adherence to the same historical and theoretical heritage.

Autonomous anarchists began to be noticed by the French state at the turn of the 2000s; they engaged in a series of practices ranging from sabotage to the establishment of autonomous zones, and a plurality of forms of action against the state and capitalism. They spread during the first half of the 21st century, and while some of their early groups, such as the appellistes, maintained ambiguous positions regarding anarchism, this situation evolved during the 2010s in response to state repression directed at them. Initially in significant conflict with traditional anarchist institutions in France, growing rapprochements occurred during those same years. Very active in the ZADs and later within the Yellow Vests movement, they gained increasing importance within the far-left in France, a situation that has been solidified since the 2010s–2020s, when they managed, for example, to exclude the CGT trade union from the May Day demonstration, accusing it of being reformist and complicit with the authorities.

== Sociology ==
Contrary to popular belief propagated by the French Communist Party (PCF) since the 1970s to discredit the autonomists, autonomous anarchist militants are far from all being children of the bourgeoisie. In reality, according to Sylvain Boulouque, a specialist in the far-left in France, such a study has never been conducted, and it is therefore impossible to evaluate the sociology of the individuals concerned. According to his analyses, this is primarily a "fantasy" stemming from the theses of the PCF.

== History ==
=== Context ===
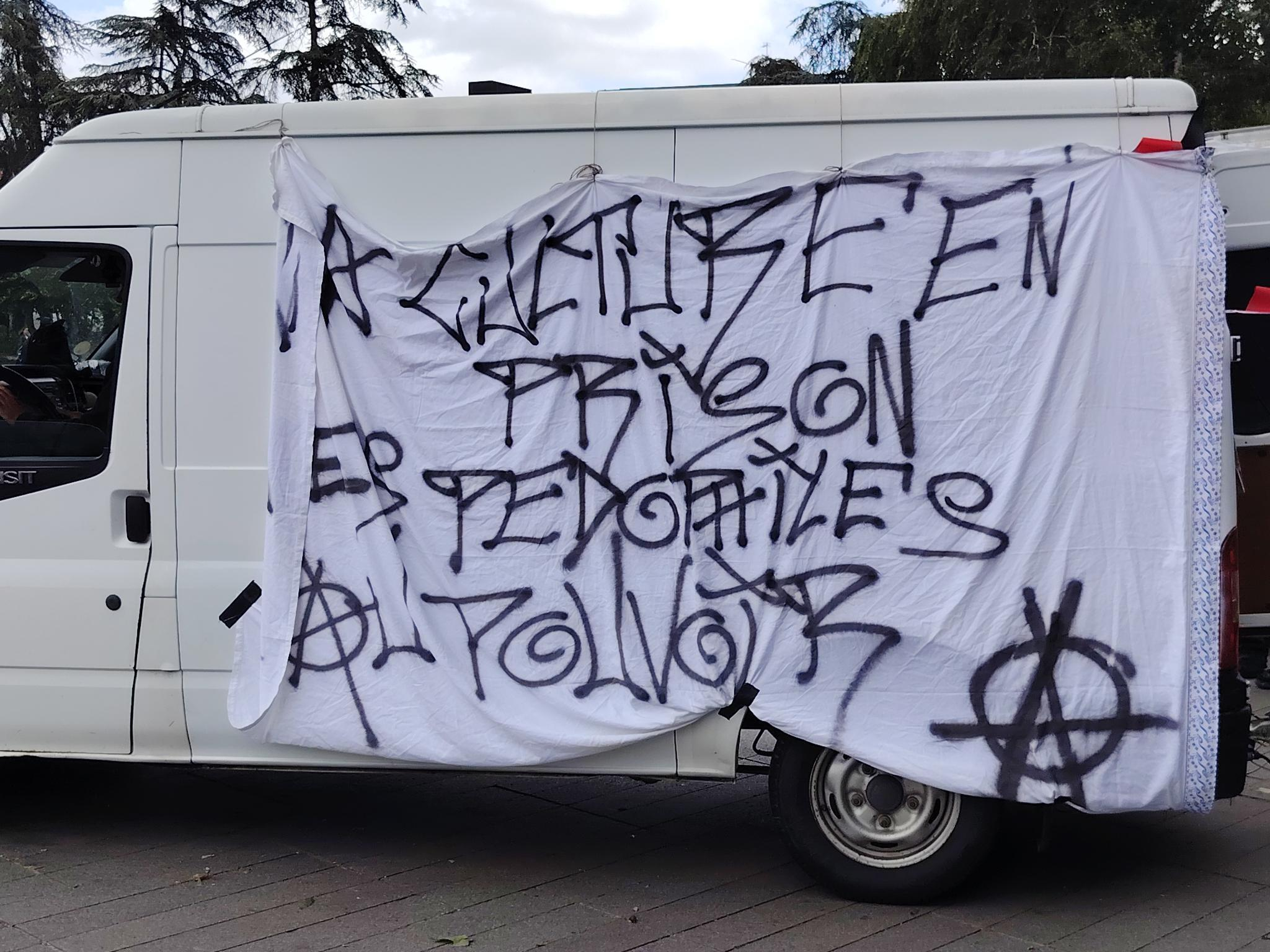
"Culture is in prison and pedophiles in power" anarchist banner by totos (2026)

The autonomist movement is a Marxist movement that emerged during the 1960s and 1970s in Italy. It is a movement originating from anti-authoritarian Marxist reflections. In Italy, it primarily involved Marxist workers wishing to separate themselves from communist structures viewed as too authoritarian, such as the Italian Communist Party. Following a development that brought together hundreds of thousands of workers, the Italian movement dissipated under pressure from increasingly intense state repression.

The autonomist movement subsequently spread throughout Europe, especially in Germany and France, where it began to reach a younger and more marginalized demographic, still based on Marxist foundations. There, the practices adopted by these groups were more radical, with some joining Marxist-Leninist terrorist-type groups such as Action directe (AD) or the Red Army Faction (RAF). However, starting in the second half of the 1980s, several dynamics undermined these movements: on one hand, the K-Groups began to be reintegrated into the West German state and subsequently disappeared; this process was partly driven by the legalization of squats in West Germany starting in 1984. On the other hand, the terrorist actions of groups such as Action directe alienated the more moderate autonomists in France, who left the movement.

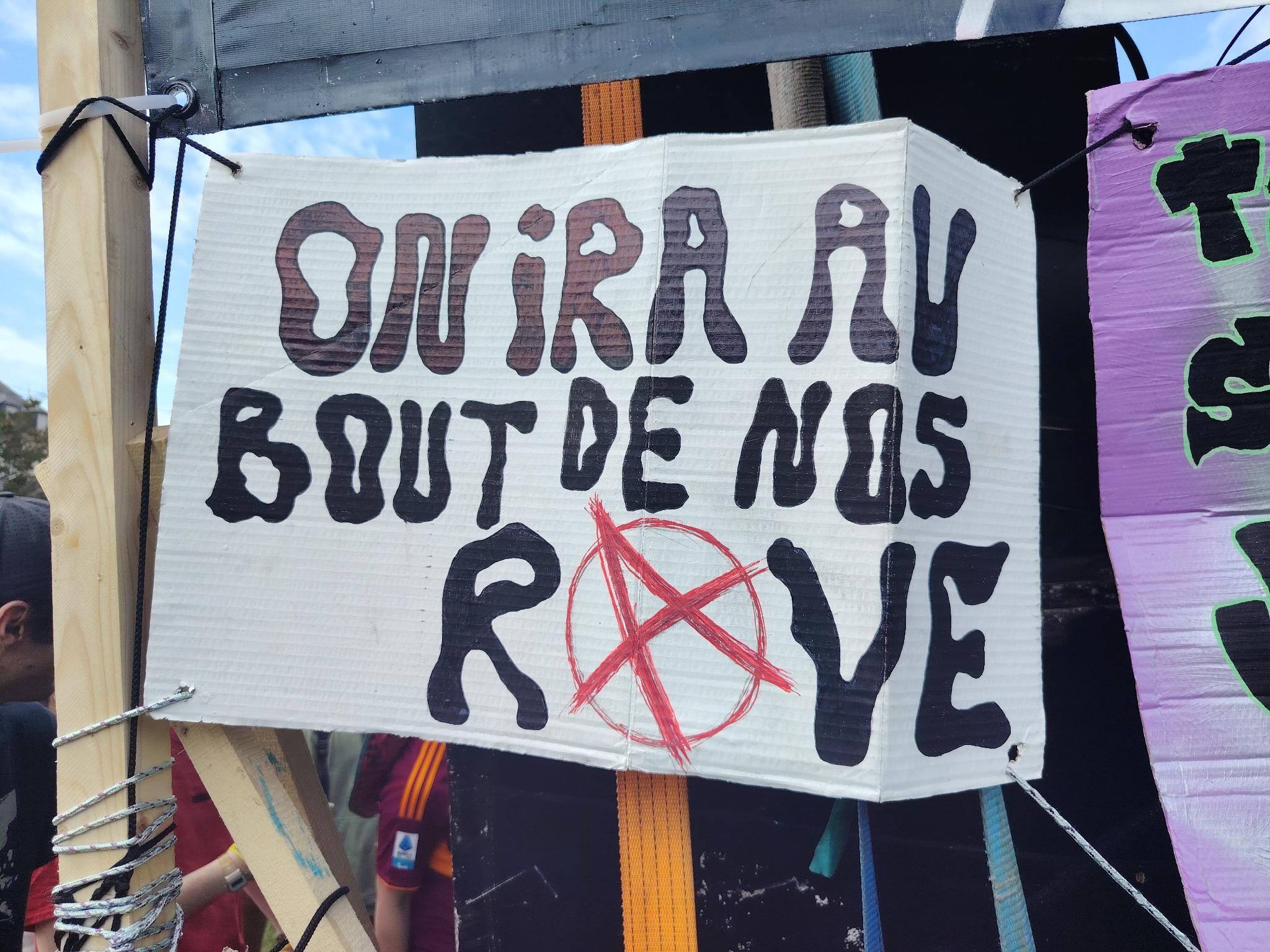
'We'll fulfill our dreams/raves' sign with a circle-A taken by companion Mel (2026)

Between the late 1980s and 1991, the USSR and its satellite states, the Eastern Bloc, went through a series of events that led to their collapse and the reunification of Germany into a single state. Alongside these major geopolitical developments on the global stage, other dynamics took shape within the far-left, notably the growing discrediting of Marxism–Leninism and forms of state socialism in general. This led, among other things, to the rebirth of the anarchist movement, which gradually "eclipsed" these opposing tendencies within the far-left and regained an increasingly central importance within it, according to historians Spencer Beswick and the Marxist historian Max Elbaum.

During these years, a strategy was propagated by the resurgent anarchist movement: the black bloc. Although the autonomist movement was in a period of internal decline during the 1990s, this strategy exerted a lasting influence on it.

=== History of the autonomist anarchists (2000–present) ===
At the turn of the century, several mobilizations brought anarchists and autonomists into the same struggles, notably within the alter-globalization movement, particularly during the Battle of Seattle (1999) or the anti-G8 protests in Genoa (2001), where both participated extensively in the black bloc, and subsequently during later mobilizations in Europe in the 2000s.

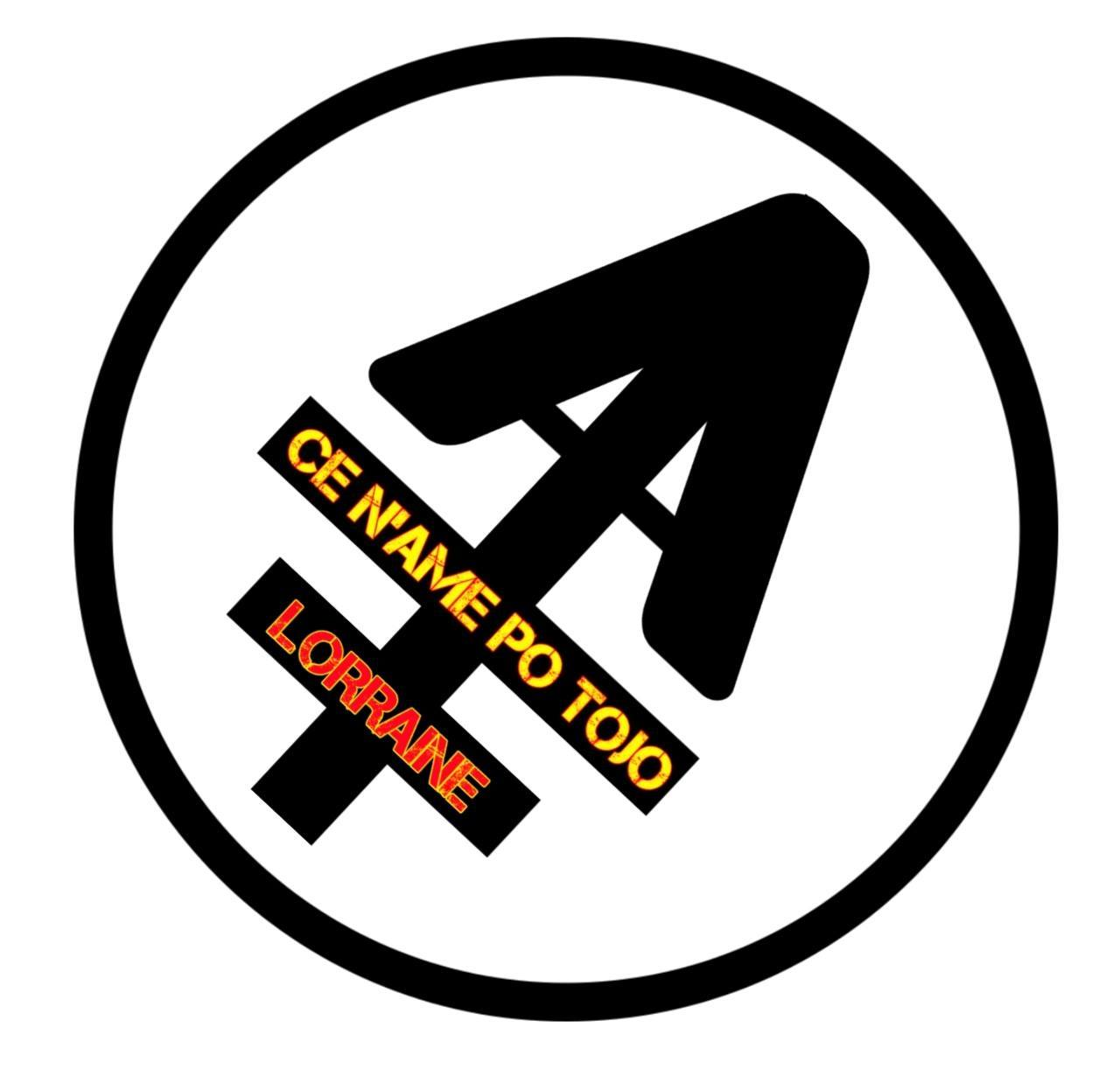
The logo of the Bloc Lorrain including a circle A

In reality, this dynamic of growing convergence is not entirely new, as autonomists from previous generations, essentially Marxist, had progressively, and as early as the 1970s, rediscovered anarchism and begun to increasingly reintegrate some of its practices and ideas. By 2000, French intelligence services reported on what they termed the "anarcho-autonomous" movement (abbreviated as 'toto'), which occupied a relatively marginal place in a report at the time; eight years later, this movement occupied a central place in their reports. These convergences were accompanied by a gradual abandonment of the Marxist and communist traditions that marked the origins of the autonomist movement.

In 2006, the movement against the CPE once again brought together these same increasingly unified forces. Then, two years later, even as French intelligence service reports became increasingly alarmist about them and suspected them of wishing to carry out international terrorism, the Tarnac affair, a case involving the sabotage of railway catenary lines, occurred, involving the appellistes, who were then one of the main subgroups (though adopting ambiguous positions regarding anarchism) of this emerging trend.

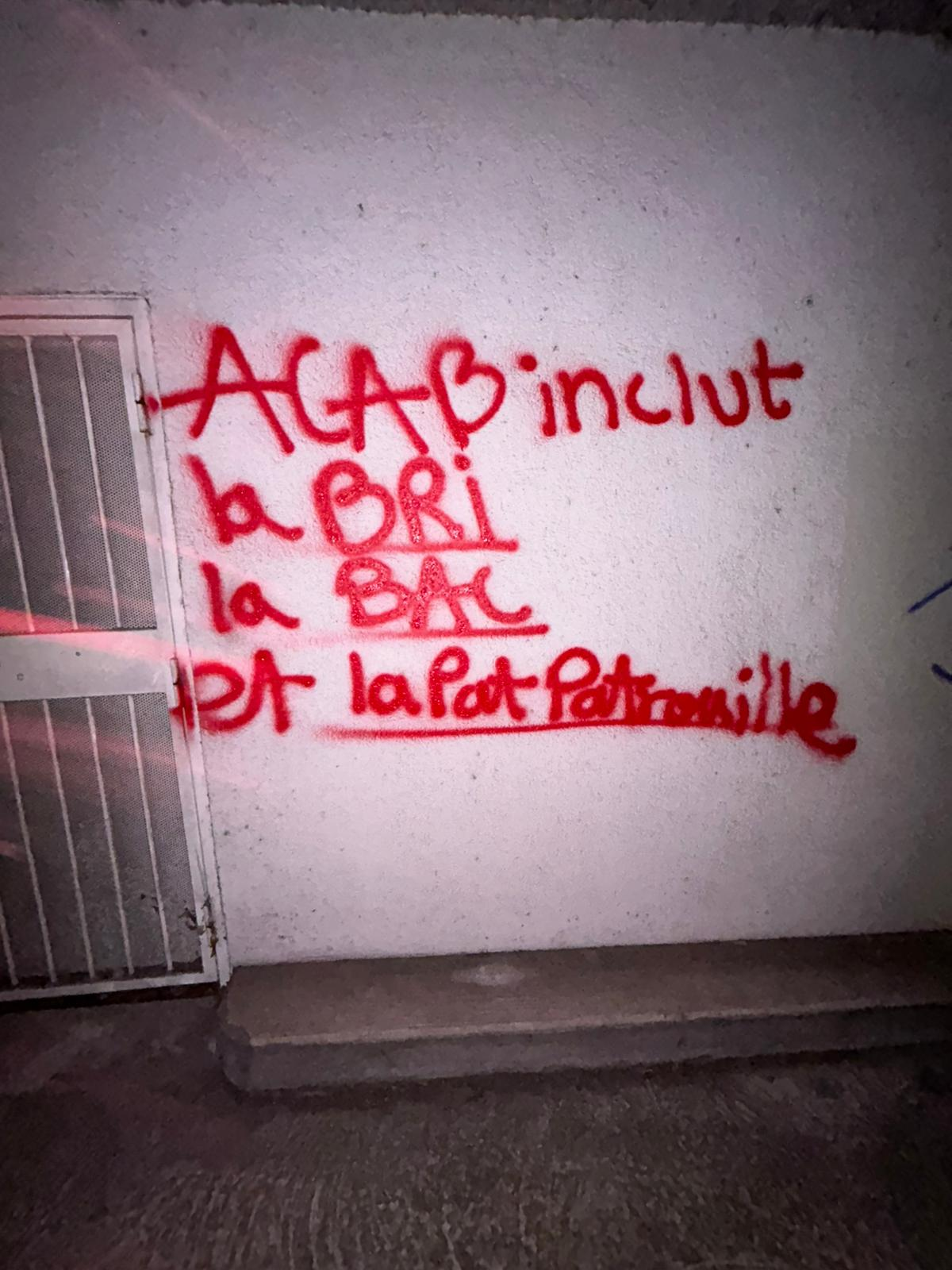
Toto tag reading 'ACAB includes the BRI, BAC and the Paw Patrol', referring to various French police forces (2026)

At the turn of the 2010s, new mobilizations widely involved autonomous anarchists, including the Zones to Defend (ZADs) movement, foremost among which was Notre-Dame-des-Landes (2009–2018), an occupation and autonomous anarchist zone created to resist the French state's desire to build an airport there. Since at least those years, the totos have developed the structure of general assemblies (AGs), which bring together a series of individuals without official political affiliation, without elected officials, and held in a self-managed manner, where everyone has the right to speak on the condition that their proposals and interventions do not break the anti-authoritarian structure of the gathering. The researcher Manon Him-Aquilli provides an example of a call to such a gathering for an AG in Notre-Dame-des-Landes, which stated:

Our collective is a structure open to all those who come to the AGs. There is no party membership, no structure other than the regular GA and the "commissions" that are totally self-managed, and in a completely horizontal manner, without a board, elected members, or anything else. We are not a 1901 law association!

Initially, traditional anarchist organizations in France, such as the Fédération anarchiste (FA) or the Confédération nationale du Travail (CNT), viewed autonomous anarchists with suspicion and rejection; this position was shared in reverse, as ties were relatively loose or even conflictual. This was also due, according to the anarchist historian and activist close to toto circles, Francis Dupuis-Déri, to a dogmatic individualism that they could exhibit, and a systematic rejection of those organizations during that period. Despite these initial oppositions, which partly continued into the 2020s, the situation evolved during the 2010s toward greater porosity between the two, to the point where he notes that by 2018, individuals could quite easily move between anarchist autonomism, and these organizations over the course of their lives, or even within the same mobilization.

In 2016, the mobilization against and the repression of anarchist demands during the passage of the El Khomri law triggered two dynamics, according to Isabelle Sommier: on one hand, a new generation of militants began joining the movement, and on the other, syndicalist organizations (including the CNT) viewed the black bloc and its militants with increasing sympathy, seeing them as increasingly desirable and useful. However, conflicts grew between the autonomist anarchists and reformist unions, such as the CFDT, whose offices were targeted during this mobilization as being complicit with the French state and capitalism.

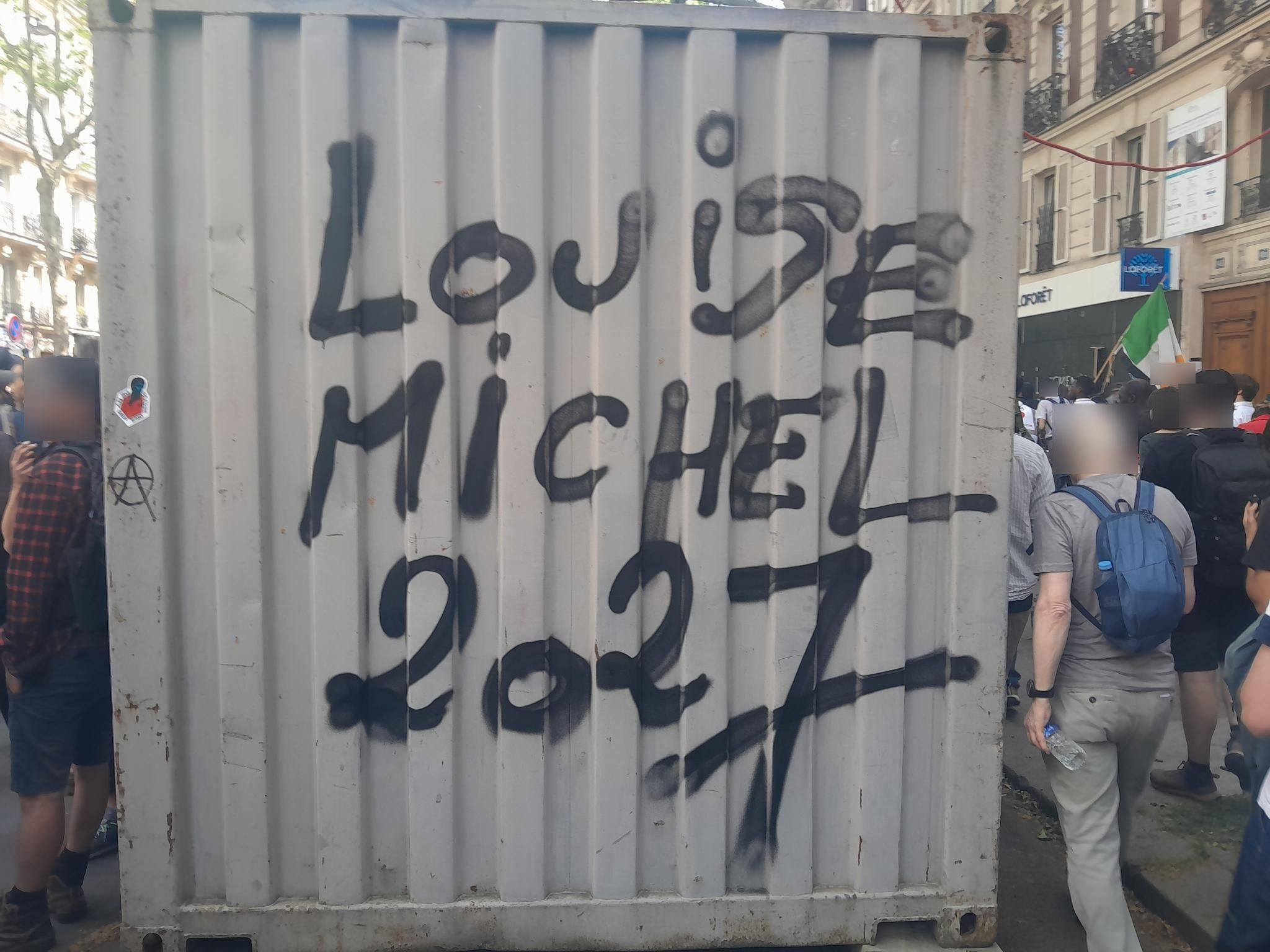
Toto graffiti during the demonstration of May Day 2026 in Paris asking for Louise Michel for 2027, a reference to the 2027 French presidential elections

Toward the end of the Notre-Dame-des-Landes ZAD, serious conflicts arose between the appellistes, who maintained an ambiguous and critical relationship with anarchism, and other younger, more radical autonomous anarchists who wished to remain aligned with anarchist ideological principles. A more pragmatic basis for these conflicts was the French state's proposal to negotiate with the zadistes and grant them ownership of the occupied lands in exchange for revealing their identities, a position accepted by the appellistes but rejected by the other groups. These internal conflicts concluded with physical violence between militants and the end of the ZAD.

Autonomous anarchists participated extensively in the Yellow Vests movement, which emerged in France in 2018 and continued in the following years. While they were critical of the racist and homophobic nature of certain demands, they decided to participate nonetheless to prevent the movement from being co-opted by the far-right. Generally, two opposing anarchist poles emerged within the Yellow Vests, both seeking to occupy a central role: on one hand, a closed orientation seeking to transmit anarchist ideology to as many Yellow Vests as possible, and on the other, a more open orientation that accepted political differences provided that insurrectionary (and thus anarchist) actions were pursued. Broad convergences existed between autonomous anarchists and the Yellow Vests; for instance, the Bloc lorrain, which primarily brought together Yellow Vests and featured a circle-A in its logo, stood at the junction between the two.

During this time, the oppositions between them and reformist unions intensified; they took a more violent turn on May Day 2021, when the black bloc, composed mainly of autonomous anarchists and Yellow Vests, participated in the attack on the CGT's security service, which was accused of being complicit with the authorities and capitalism. This attack, which resulted in dozens of injuries, marked a shift in the balance of power in the streets and caused reformist unions to retreat after realizing they could no longer maintain the central position they had previously occupied in street protests.

== Bibliography ==
- Barrier, Lucas (2023). Le mouvement des Gilets Jaunes comme analyseur des crises des fonctions socio-psychiques des institutions sociales. Université d'Angers.
- Beswick, Spencer (2022). From the Ashes of the Old: Anarchism Reborn in a Counterrevolutionary Age (1970s-1990s). Vol. 30. Anarchist Studies. pp. 31–54. doi:10.3898/AS.30.2.02.
- Bulle, Sylvaine (2022). Irréductibles : Enquête sur des milieux de vie de Bure à N.-D.-des-Landes. Grenoble: UGA Éditions. ISBN 978-2-37747-209-3.
- Cleaver, Harry (2000). Reading Capital Politically (2nd ed.). Leeds / Edinburgh: AK Press / Anti/Theses. ISBN 1-902593-29-4.
- Cuninghame, Patrick (2010). Autonomism as a global movement. Vol. 13. The Journal of Labor and Society. pp. 451–464. doi:10.1111/j.1743-4580.2010.00305.x.
- Dupuis-Déri, Francis (2018). Les nouveaux anarchistes: de l'altermondialisme au zadisme. Paris: Textuel. ISBN 978-2-84597-750-1.
- Garland, Christian (2009). "Autonomism". In Ness, Immanuel (ed.). The International Encyclopedia of Revolution and Protest. Wiley. pp. 322–324. doi:10.1002/9781405198073.wbierp0152. ISBN 978-1-4051-8464-9.
- Geronimo (2012). Fire and Flames: A History of the German Autonomist Movement. Oakland: PM Press. ISBN 978-1-60486-097-9.
- Him-Aquilli, Manon (2017). Distribuer le pouvoir comme on distribue la parole : le rituel des « tours de parole » dans des assemblées générales anarchistes/autonomes. Vol. 43. Semen. doi:10.4000/semen.10710.
- Katsiaficas, George N. (2006). The subversion of politics: European autonomous social movements and the decolonization of everyday life. Oakland, CA: AK Press. ISBN 978-1-904859-53-6.
- Schifres, Sébastien (2004). La mouvance autonome en France de 1976 à 1984 (PDF). Université de Nanterre.
- Sommier, Isabelle (2021). "Chapitre 1. La discontinuité des violences idéologiques". Violences politiques en France. Presses de Sciences Po. pp. 27–54. ISBN 978-2-7246-2730-5.
- Sommier, Isabelle (2023). Commission d'enquête sur la structuration, le financement, les moyens et les modalités d'action des groupuscules auteurs de violences. Assemblée nationale.
