= Caroline De Haas =

French activist, politician, and feminist

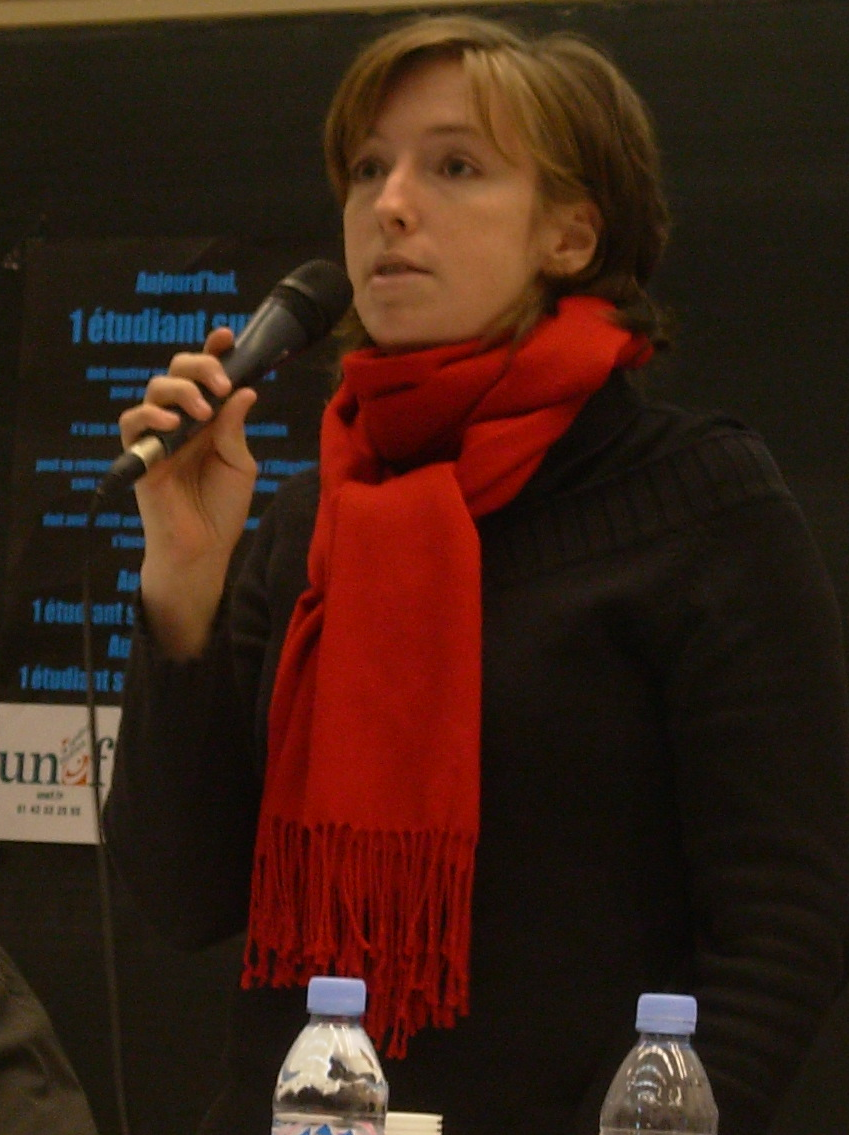
- Born: 10 September 1980 (age 45); Bourg-en-Bresse
- Occupations: Activist, politician, and feminist

Caroline De Haas (born 10 September 1980) is a French activist, feminist, politician, and socialist. She is the founder of Collectif NousToutes.

== Biography ==
Her mother is a gynecologist and her father is a general practitioner. She is the eldest of eight children.

She studied contemporary history at the University of Lyon II and obtained a master's degree at the University of Nanterre. From 2006 to 2009, she served as treasurer and then general secretary of the UNEF. From 2009 to 2011, she served as spokesperson for Osez le féminisme! ("Dare Feminism!"). She started as an activist in the Young Socialist Movement before joining the Socialist Party as press officer for Benoît Hamon's spokesperson, until 2012. She was appointed advisor for relations with associations and the fight against gender-based violence but later left due to a lack of debate within the party.

In 2018, she founded the collective #NousToutes to fight against gender-based and sexual violence in France.
