= Collectif NousToutes =

French feminist collective

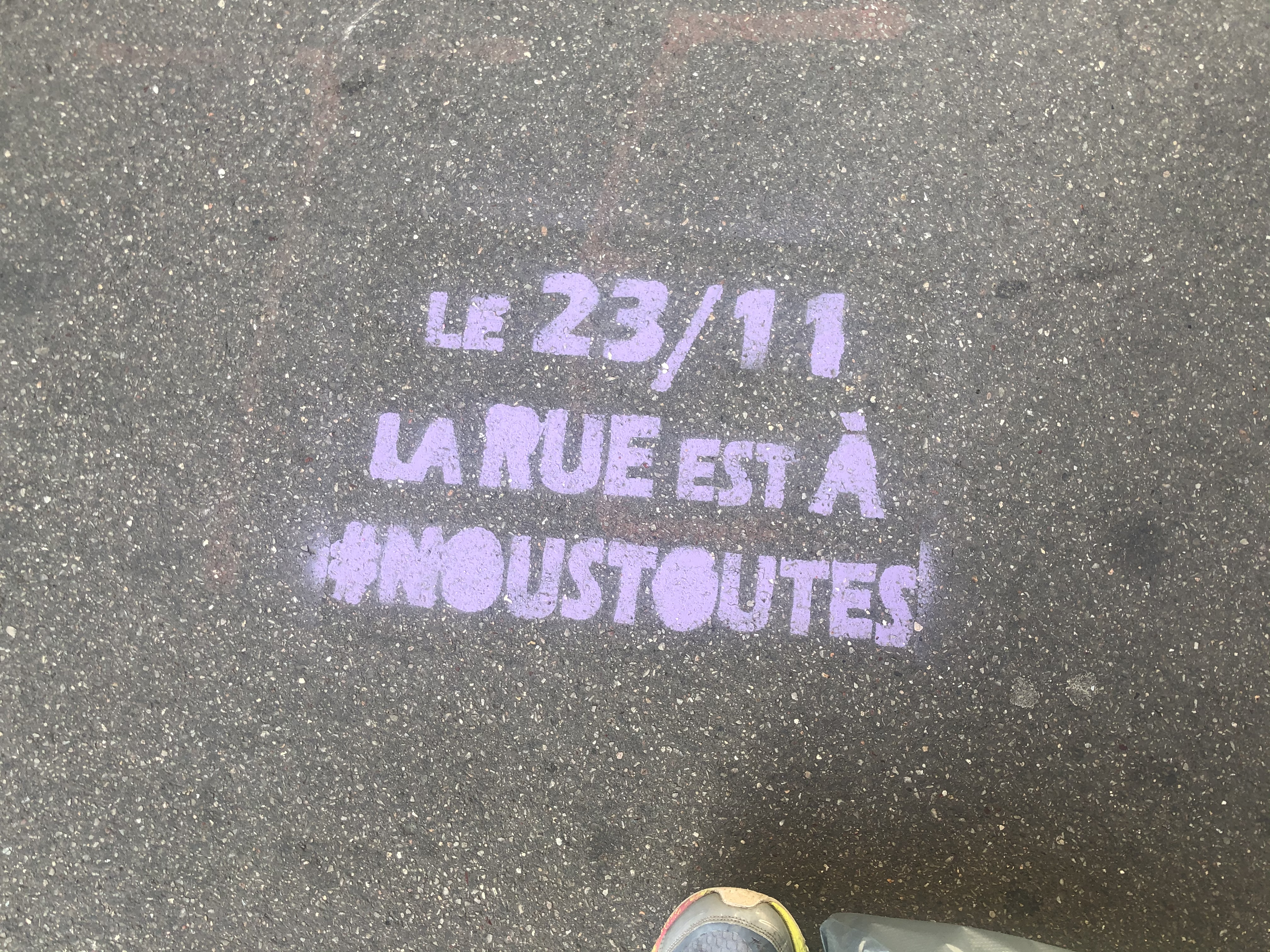

The Collectif NousToutes is a French feminist collective, dedicated to fighting against violence against women.

== History ==
The group was founded on 3 July 2018, in the aftermath of the #MeToo and #BalanceTonPorc movements, and included Caroline De Haas among its founders.

Throughout the second half of 2018, the collective held a number of events, including a conference on defence against sexual violence on 20 September and a protest demonstration on 24 November, attended by 80 000 people across five cities.

In early March 2019, the collective put up 1400 fake street name signs across Paris bearing names of famous women or victims of violence against women. The group noted that only 2% of street names in the city were named after women. In July 2019, the group participated in a demonstration at Place de la République to denounce the Macron government's silence on sexual violence. On 23 November 2019, the collective organised another large demonstration, with over 150 000 protests in attendance, including 100 000 in Paris.

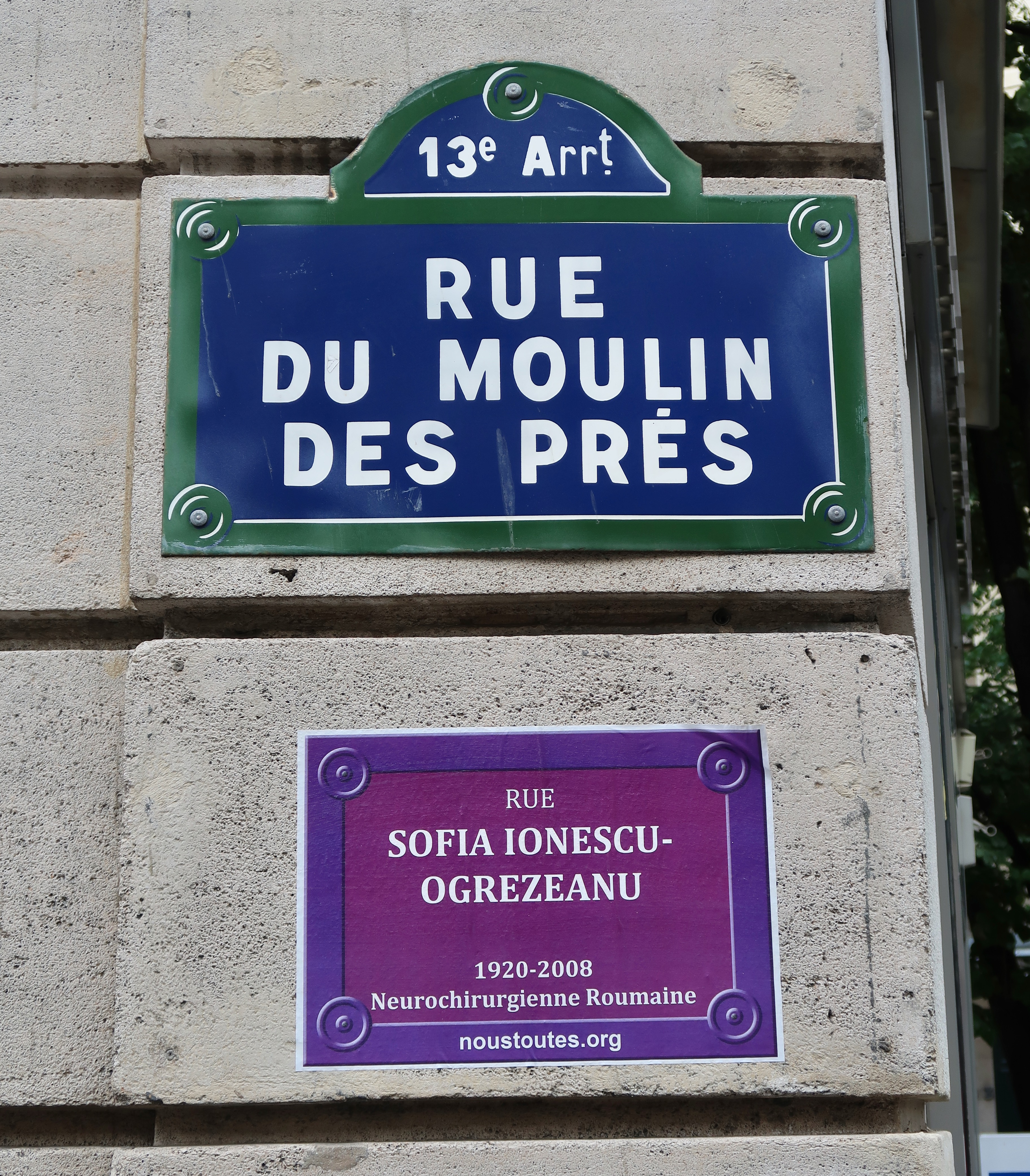
Fake street sign referring to Sofia Ionescu put up in Paris in 2019.

In April 2020, the group partnered with UNICEF and launched an online portal to help prevent violence against children during pandemic lockdown. The collective was unable to hold a mass demonstration in November 2020 due to the COVID-19 pandemic in France, but joined several other feminist groups in organising online events.

In March 2021, the group launched an online survey calling for testimonies from women who had filed police reports on domestic violence, gathering over 3500 answers. According to the collective, around two-thirds of those who participated in the survey stated that they faced a hostile reception from the police. That month, the collective also launch a campaign that saw several bakeries across France place phone numbers of violence against women hotlines on their bread packaging.

== Legacy ==
=== Role in defining boundaries within the feminist movement in France ===
#NousToutes have been noted by journalist and gender studies researcher Léane Alestra as one of the primary feminist organizations, alongside Kessem and the Féministes Révolutionnaires, to actively oppose co-option attempts by the far-right collective Némésis during the first half of the 2020s. This issue was one of the significant political challenges facing the feminist movement in France during this period.
