= Les Soulèvements de la Terre =

Environmental collective

Les Soulèvements de la Terre (The Earth Uprisings Collective) is an appellist and environmental collective, part of the civil society in France.

== History ==
The collective was founded in 2021 by former members of the ZAD de Notre-Dame-des-Landes. The group's actions in protest of the privatization of public resources (such as water in privately owned reservoirs) were labeled ecoterrorism by Minister of the Interior Gérald Darmanin in late October 2022. The use of this term was criticized in academia and the press as an abuse of language.

In December 2022, members of the collective occupied a Lafarge cement factory in Bouc-Bel-Air.

On 25 March 2023, the collective co-organized a protest against a mega-reservoir project in Sainte-Soline along with the Confédération paysanne and the anti-reservoir group Bassines non merci. Despite the protest being banned by the government of Emmanuel Macron, around 6000 protestors were in attendance. The protest was violently broken up by police, who fired over 4000 tear gas and flash bang grenades, resulting in around 200 injured protestors.

On 28 March 2023, Gérald Darminin announced that he intended to have the group administratively dissolved, to make it illegal for it to meet. In early June, the anti-terrorist unit of the national police executed two raids in relation to the occupation of the cement factory. A total of 22 people were held for questioning in two batches, the first 15 for four days.

== Attempted dissolution ==
On 21 June 2023, interior Minister Darmanin announced the administrative dissolution of the group. Human Rights Watch called the dissolution "wholly disproportionate" and part of "a growing trend of stigmatization and criminalization of individuals and civil society organizations raising awareness about the consequences of climate change" in France. Amnesty International France said that it was a violation of the right to freedom of association and that the French government was targeting environmental groups. The French Human Rights League stated that the move was part of crackdown on opposition to the government.

On 9 November 2023, the Council of State annulled the decree dissolving the group, citing a clear disproportion between the actions of the group and the reactions of the government.

== Political positions and ideology ==
Sophie Del Fa of the Université catholique de Louvain has described the collective as being part of an anticapitalist and environmental movement that originated in the Occupy movement after the 2008 financial crisis, saying that it has also drawn inspiration from the Zapatista movement.

== Legacy ==
=== Repression of the Soulèvements de la Terre as indicative of an 'authoritarian turn' in France ===
The fact that Gérald Darmanin targeted the Bloc Lorrain, GALE, and also Les Soulèvements de la Terre was part of a repressive orientation directed toward groups subscribing to deep ecology. Regarding this repression, researchers Julien Talpin and Antonio Delfini wrote in their work concerning an 'authoritarian turn' initiated in France since 2017:

After the failure to dissolve Nantes révoltée, the Ministry returned to the offensive two months later, targeting the Groupe antifasciste Lyon et environs (GALE) on 20 March 2022. [...] The 1972 law, intended to protect against racial hate speech, now protects the State itself: an overly virulent critique of public authorities can now be passed off as hate speech, even when it targets institutions rather than individuals. Love the Republic or disappear. On 21 October 2022, it was the Bloc Lorrain's turn to be targeted for 'incitement to hatred and violence', specifically directed toward law enforcement.
