= Union communiste libertaire =

- Leader: Collective leadership
- Founded: 10 June 2019
- Ideology: Anarcho-communism; Anarcha-feminism; Anti-racism; Social ecology
- Political position: Far-left
- International affiliation: Anarkismo.net
- Colours: Red, Black

Website
- unioncommunistelibertaire.org

The Union communiste libertaire (UCL, English: Libertarian Communist Union) is a French platformist federation, established in 2019 from the merging of Alternative Libertaire and the Coordination of Anarchist Groups. In addition to revolutionary struggle, they engage in social and environmental struggles.

== History ==
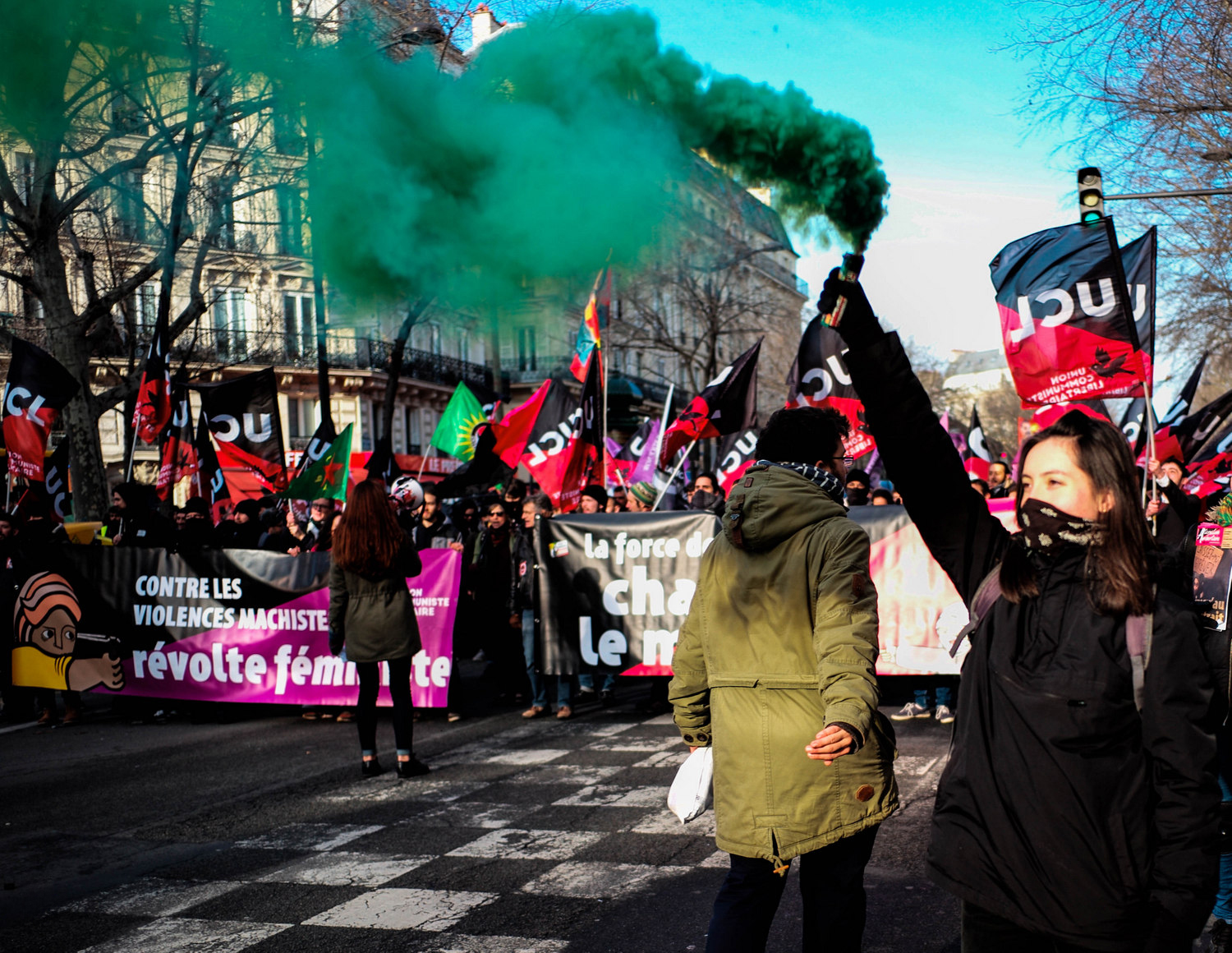
UCL demonstration in Paris, January 2020

At a founding congress organized in the Allier from 8 to 10 June 2019, Alternative Libertaire (AL) and the Coordination of Anarchist Groups (CGA) enacted their fusion, the result of a year of discussions. AL, the successor of the Libertarian Communist Workers' Union founded in 1991, and the CGA, a split of the Anarchist Federation founded in 2002, were two libertarian communist organizations. Close ideologically and in their political practice, they began their merger in February 2018.

The new organization, which wants to set up self-organized struggles, aims to lead feminist, anti-racist, pro-LGBTI and ecologist struggles at the same time as the anarcho-communist and revolutionary struggle. It wants to be able to lead a "popular counter-power", which is placed "neither on the electoral ground nor on the level of institutions". UCL retains red and black colors, symbolic of communism and anarchism, as well as the Libertarian Alternative newspaper, which did not change its name. In the same month, UCL claimed about forty local groups linked to the organization and more than five hundred members. Many were trade unionists, from unions such as Solidaires Unitaires Démocratiques or the General Confederation of Labour and associations.

UCL, anarchist protest in France, on October 16th 2020 during the COVID-19 pandemic

The Libertarian Communist Union supported the Yellow vests movement since its inception. The group created a branch in Millau in late 2019. In late 2024 the UCL joined the International Coordination of Organized Anarchism, an international network of platformist and especifist anarchist groups.
