= Groupe antifasciste Lyon et environs =

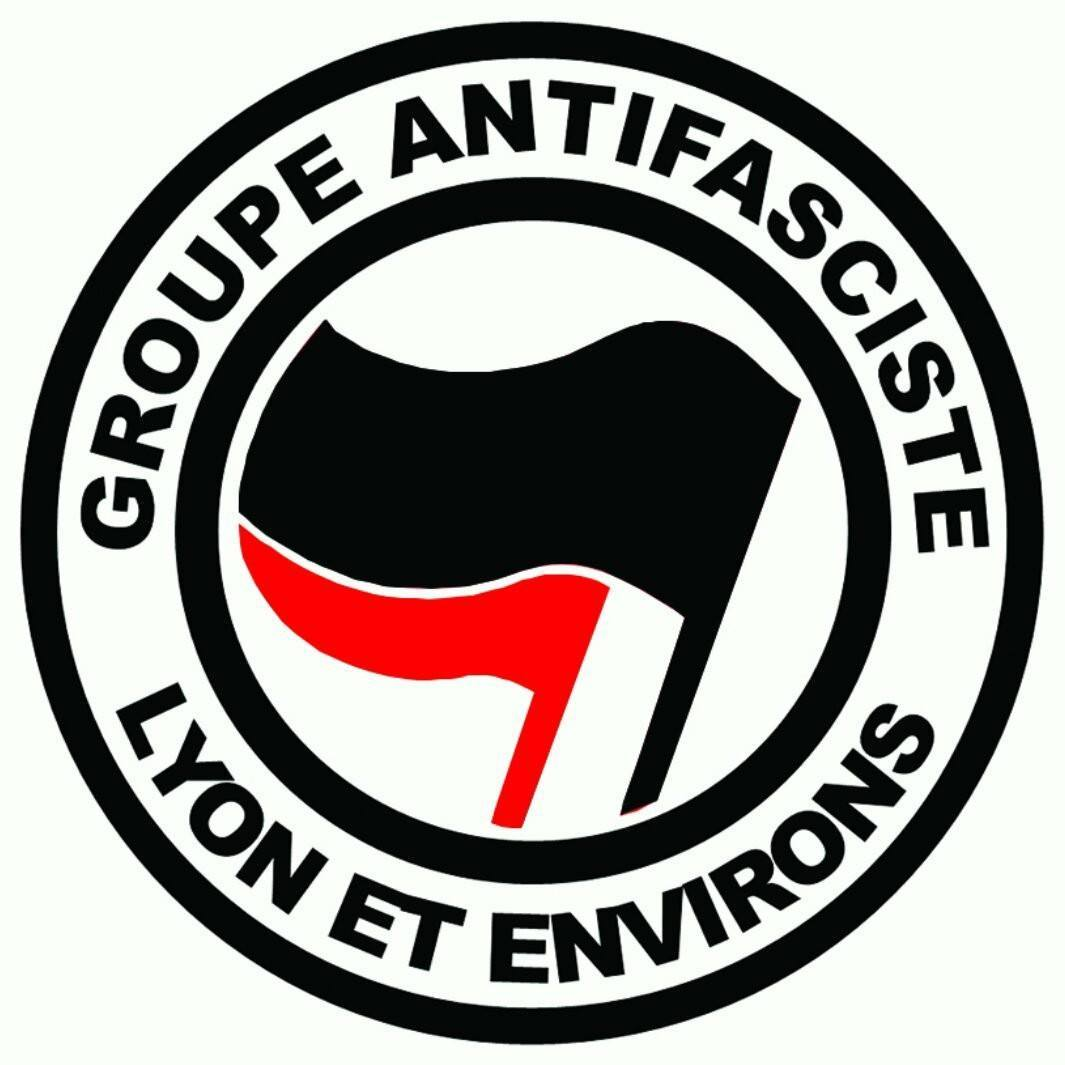
- Dates active: October 2013-present (officially banned in 2023)
- Active regions: Rhône region, France
- Ideology: Anarchism; Insurrectionary anarchism; Autonomous Marxism (minoritary)
- Political position: Far-left
- Size: 50 members and supporters (claimed in 2017)

The Groupe antifasciste Lyon et environs (English: Antifascist group of Lyon and surroundings), known as 'La GALE,' is a French far-left antifascist collective founded in October 2013 in Lyon.

Identifying with the autonomous antifascist movement, its orientation is revolutionary and insurrectionalist. It asserts that violence is a legitimate political practice. Its members are predominantly anarchist, with a Marxist-Leninist minority. The group primarily conducts intelligence-gathering on the far-right and engages in direct confrontation with fascist circles, while also involving itself in social struggles.

Dissolved by the government on 30 March 2022, a first for a far-left group since Action Directe in 1982 in France, its dissolution was initially suspended by the Conseil d'État before the latter ultimately validated its legality in November 2023.

== History ==
The Groupe antifasciste Lyon et environs, commonly nicknamed 'La GALE', was founded in October 2013 in Lyon, in the wake of the killing of Clément Méric. It was based in the Guillotière district.

In December 2017, it organized an international antifascist demonstration, the first of its kind in Lyon in three years, followed by the fifth edition of the Lyon Antifa Fest (LAF).

Ideological differences, strategic disagreements, and personal conflicts pit La GALE against La Jeune Garde, another Lyon-based antifascist collective. These tensions eventually led to physical confrontations between members from the two groups.

In the summer of 2021, during an anti-health pass demonstration in Lyon where both left-wing and far-right marches coexisted, members of La GALE clashed with Civitas activists who had joined the left-wing procession. A fight broke out, with the Civitas activists striking the first blows.

In September 2021, seven men aged 21 to 55 were arrested following the violence, four of whom were placed in pre-trial detention. During their immediate appearance, an error with the evidence seals prevented the viewing of CCTV footage, leading to the dismissal of numerous police reports and the immediate acquittal of three defendants. All seven suspects denied being members of La GALE.

A support committee denounced what they called 'two-tier justice', arguing that far-right groups enjoy greater impunity despite their violence. In November 2021, four men who admitted to striking blows were sentenced to a €300 fine for violence resulting in no total incapacity for work; two others received a one-month suspended prison sentence for related offenses.

On 30 March 2022, the government decreed the dissolution of La GALE, citing its participation in demonstrations marked by violence, the use of the 'ACAB' slogan, and the claiming of a 'Death to Nazis' tag found on far-right premises. It was the first far-left group to be dissolved since Action Directe in 1982. However, the Conseil d'État suspended the decree approximately six weeks later, ruling that it 'constituted a serious and manifestly illegal interference with the fundamental freedoms of assembly and association'.

Following a full review requested by La GALE's lawyers, the Council of State ruled in November 2023 in favor of the legality of the dissolution. The court judged that the group had published images of violence against police officers accompanied by insulting text, as well as messages approving violence toward far-right activists. The lawyers subsequently announced an appeal to the European Court of Human Rights.

== Ideology ==
Positioning itself as revolutionary and insurrectionalist, the group identifies with the autonomous antifascist movement and asserts that violence is a legitimate political practice. Its members are primarily anarchist in orientation, though approximately one-third of its members identify as Marxist-Leninist. It advocates for the intersectionality of struggles (anti-capitalist, anti-racist, anti-sexist, etc) without establishing a hierarchy between them.

Unlike other Lyon-based antifascist and anarchist organizations such as the Collectif de vigilance 69 or the Coordination des groupes anarchistes, La Gale claimed a strategy that is both defensive and offensive and refuses any appeal to law enforcement. La Gale also opposed the demands for the dissolution of far-right groups put forward by the Jeune Garde, arguing that such repressive logics would eventually be turned against the anti-fascist movement, which ultimately happened for both La Gale and the Jeune Garde.

These strategic differences, compounded by personal conflicts, led to physical confrontations between La GALE and the Jeune Garde. A member of La Gale claimed in 2026 that the Jeune Garde had, on certain occasions, forcibly unmasked militants in the black bloc. La Gale also occasionally clashed with labor unions, sometimes resulting in skirmishes during protests, even though they could converge, notably during the 2023 French pension reform strikes or Act 13 of the Yellow Vests movement.

== Activities ==
Its activities rely primarily on intelligence-gathering regarding the far-right 'nebula' and direct confrontation with fascist groups. The collective also participates in opening squats in the Guillotière district and involves itself in social actions in support of exiled persons. It utilizes black bloc tactics.

In 2017, the group claimed to have approximately fifty members and supporters.

== Legacy ==
=== Repression of the GALE as indicative of an 'authoritarian turn' in France ===
The fact that Gérald Darmanin targeted the Bloc Lorrain, GALE, and also Les Soulèvements de la Terre was part of a repressive orientation directed toward groups subscribing to deep ecology. Regarding this repression, researchers Julien Talpin and Antonio Delfini wrote in their work concerning an 'authoritarian turn' initiated in France since 2017:

After the failure to dissolve Nantes révoltée, the Ministry returned to the offensive two months later, targeting the Groupe antifasciste Lyon et environs (GALE) on 20 March 2022. [...] The 1972 law, intended to protect against racial hate speech, now protects the State itself: an overly virulent critique of public authorities can now be passed off as hate speech, even when it targets institutions rather than individuals. Love the Republic or disappear. On 21 October 2022, it was the Bloc Lorrain's turn to be targeted for 'incitement to hatred and violence', specifically directed toward law enforcement.

== Works ==
- Decree of 30 March 2022 on the dissolution of La Gale (in French) by Emmanuel Macron, Jean Castex and Gérald Darmanin
