= Émile-Huchet =

French thermal power plant

Coordinates: 49°09′09″N 6°42′00″E

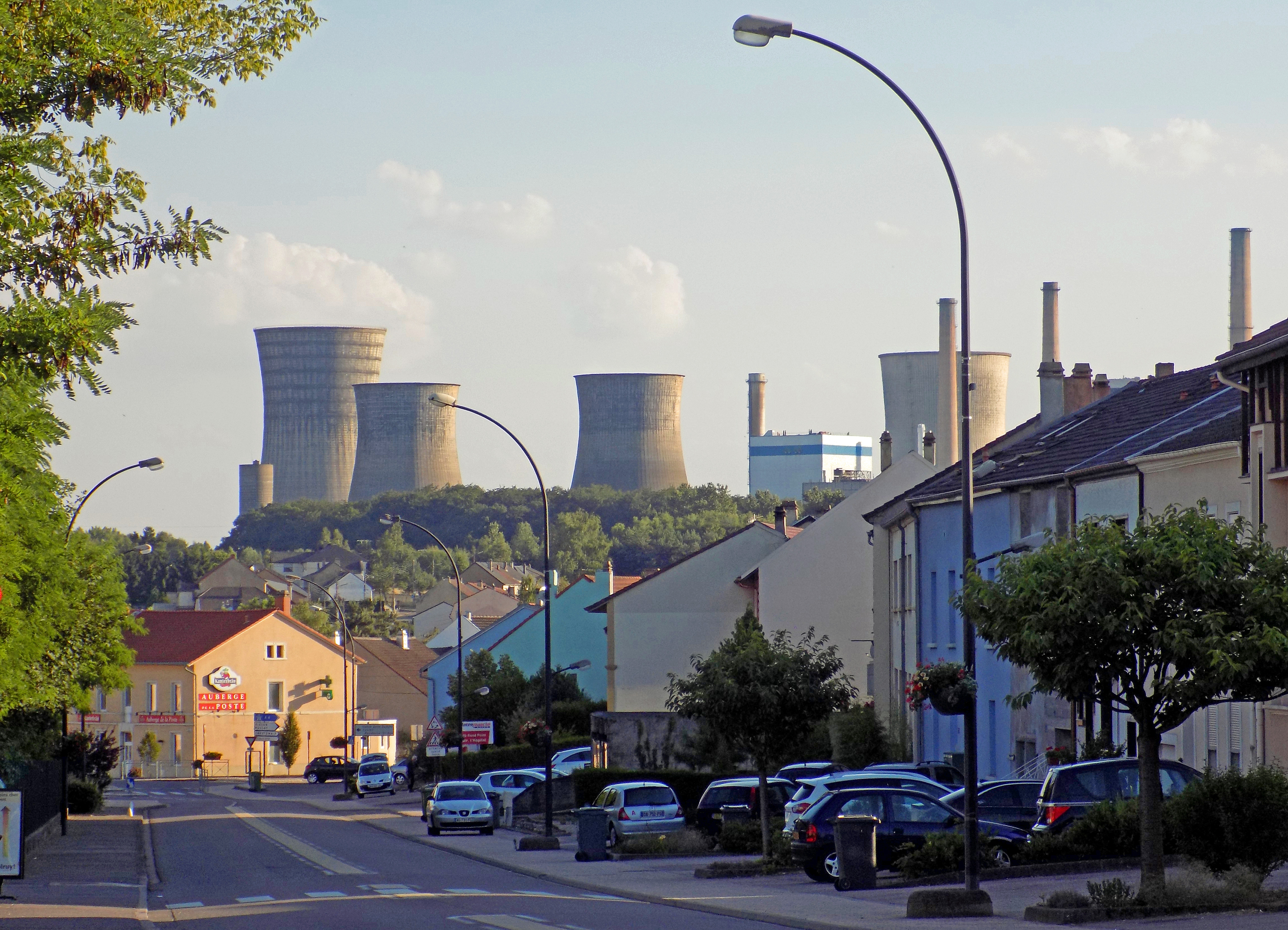

Émile-Huchet is a thermal power plant, in Moselle department, France.

== History ==
It opened in 1948. It lies in the communes Saint-Avold and Carling. It is named after Émile Huchet (1892–1940), who was the director of the coal mine Sarrre and Moselle, from 1924 to 1939. There's also a housing complex which was built for the workers, that bears his name. That complex was built shortly afterwards, and is located south of the forest of Saint-Avold.

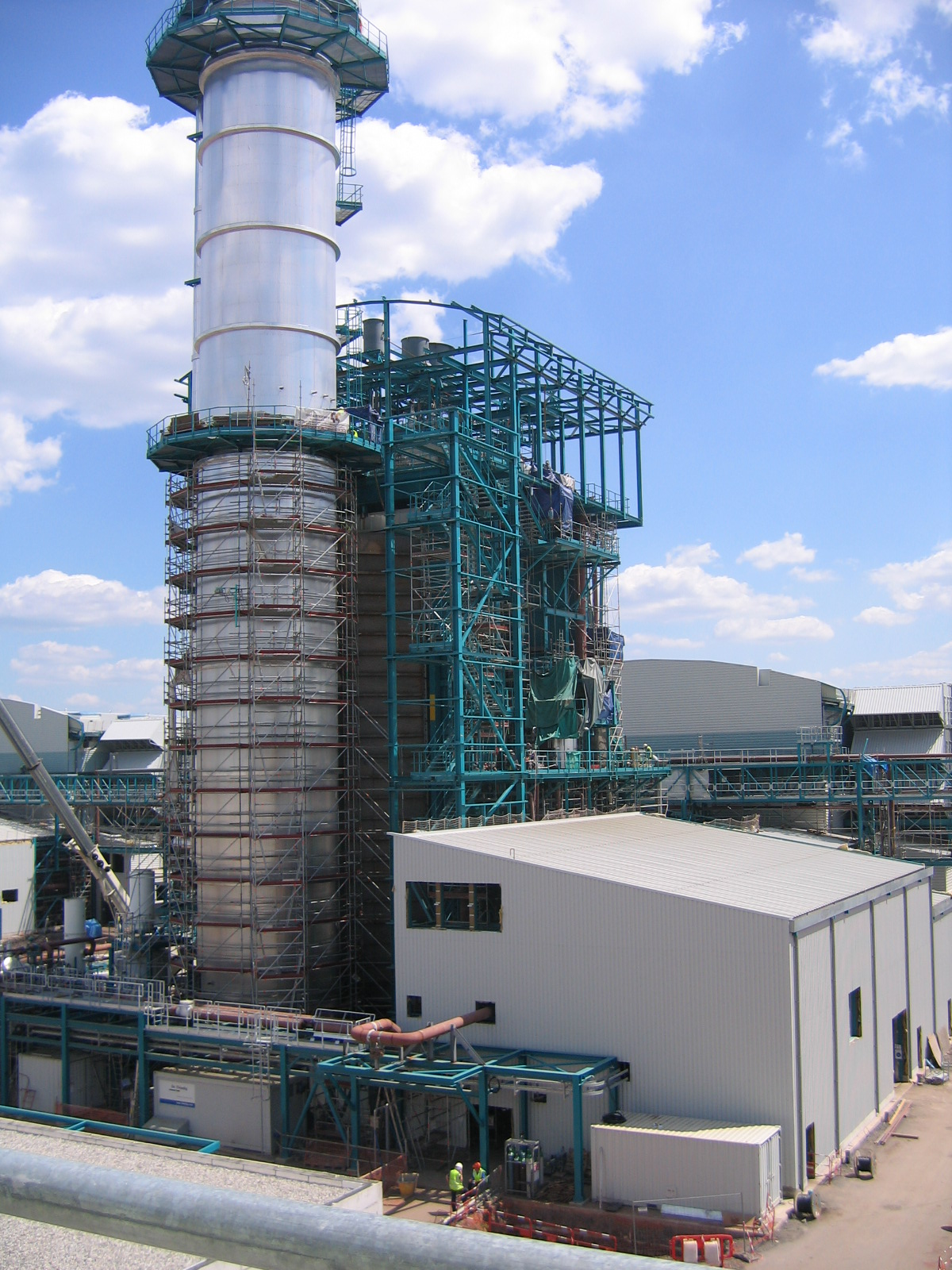
New construction, in 2009

For some time, the power plant was part of E.ON, and later Uniper SE. EPH from the Czech Republic, has operated it since 2019. The part of the plant that work with gas belong to Total.

Since the 1960s, the power plant is one of the biggest thermal power plants in France. It has a production capacity od 140 MW (electrical equivalent). There are two units of 430 MW each, powered by gas. In 2017, a total of 6.96 TWh was produced, 2.14 TWh with coal, and the remaining 4.82 TWh with gas. In early 2022, Unit 6 of 595 MW, which was powered by coal, was shut down.

Because of current problems with French nuclear power plants, and prevailing energy scarcity resulting from the Russian invasion of Ukraine, the French government is contemplating reactivating 595 MW Unit 6, but only for winter 2022.
