= Coordination of Anarchist Groups =

French political organization active 2002 to 2019

Coordination of Anarchist Groups Coordination des Groupes Anarchistes
- Abbreviation: CGA
- Leader: Collective leadership
- Founded: June 2002
- Dissolved: 10 June 2019
- Split from: Anarchist Federation
- Merged into: Libertarian Communist Union
- Newspaper: Infos et analyzes libertaires (2002-2015); Résistances libertaires (2015-2019)
- Membership (2019): 100
- Ideology: Libertarian communism Anarcho-syndicalism
- Political position: Far-left

Website
- http://www.c-g-a.org/

The Coordination of Anarchist Groups (French: Coordination des groupes anarchistes, CGA) was a French anarchist organization that split off from the Anarchist Federation at its 60th congress in June 2002.

In June 2019, the CGA merged with Alternative Libertaire to form the Libertarian Communist Union.

== History ==
The CGA was created mainly by groups from southern France who left the Anarchist Federation (French: Fédération Anarchiste, FA) at the organization's 60th congress in June 2002. The split occurred because of their refusal of the practice of unanimity in the decision-making process within the FA, which the CGA considered to be a “source of immobility”, instead favoring a method of decision-making by qualified majority.

However, it still retained links with the Anarchist Federation, with which it collaborated on a joint campaign against participation in the presidential and legislative elections of May–June 2007.

In March 2015, the CGA suffered several defederations following an internal crisis. One of the consequences was that the newspaper Infos et analyzes libertaires ceased to be the organization's press organ, being replaced by the newspaper Résistances libertaires.

In July 2018, it began a process of rapprochement with Alternative Libertaire, with a view to a possible unification. On 10 June 2019, the two organizations merged to create the Libertarian Communist Union.

== Publications ==
- Sarboni, Edward (2003). Sur Cronstadt (in French). Archived from the original on 4 March 2016.
- Coordination des groupes anarchistes; Groupe Un autre futur (Montpellier) (2005). Ordre sécuritaire et inégalités sociales: présentation et analyses des lois sécuritaires (in French). L'Esprit frappeur. ISBN 2844052193.
- Coordination des groupes anarchistes (10 April 2005). "Pour les luttes, OUI ou NON, riment avec ABANDON! L'Europe sociale ne se construira que par le biais de nos mobilisations!". RA.forum (in French).

== Bibliography ==
- "5ème congrès de la Coordination des groupes anarchiste". L'Indépendant (in French). 30 October 2012.
- Dubois-Chabert, Jean-Louis (20 January 2006). "Toulouse, terreau fertile pour graines d'ananars, deuxième Congrès de la Coordination des groupes anarchistes". La Dépêche du Midi (in French).
- Cosseron, Serge (2007). Dictionnaire de l'extrême gauche (in French). Paris: Larousse. ISBN 978-2-03-582620-6.
- Luck, Simon (2008). Sociologie de l’engagement libertaire dans la France contemporaine Socialisations individuelles, expériences collectives, et cultures politiques alternatives (PDF) (PhD) (in French). Paris 1 Panthéon-Sorbonne University.
