= Daniele Ganser =

Swiss author and conspiracy theorist (born 1972)

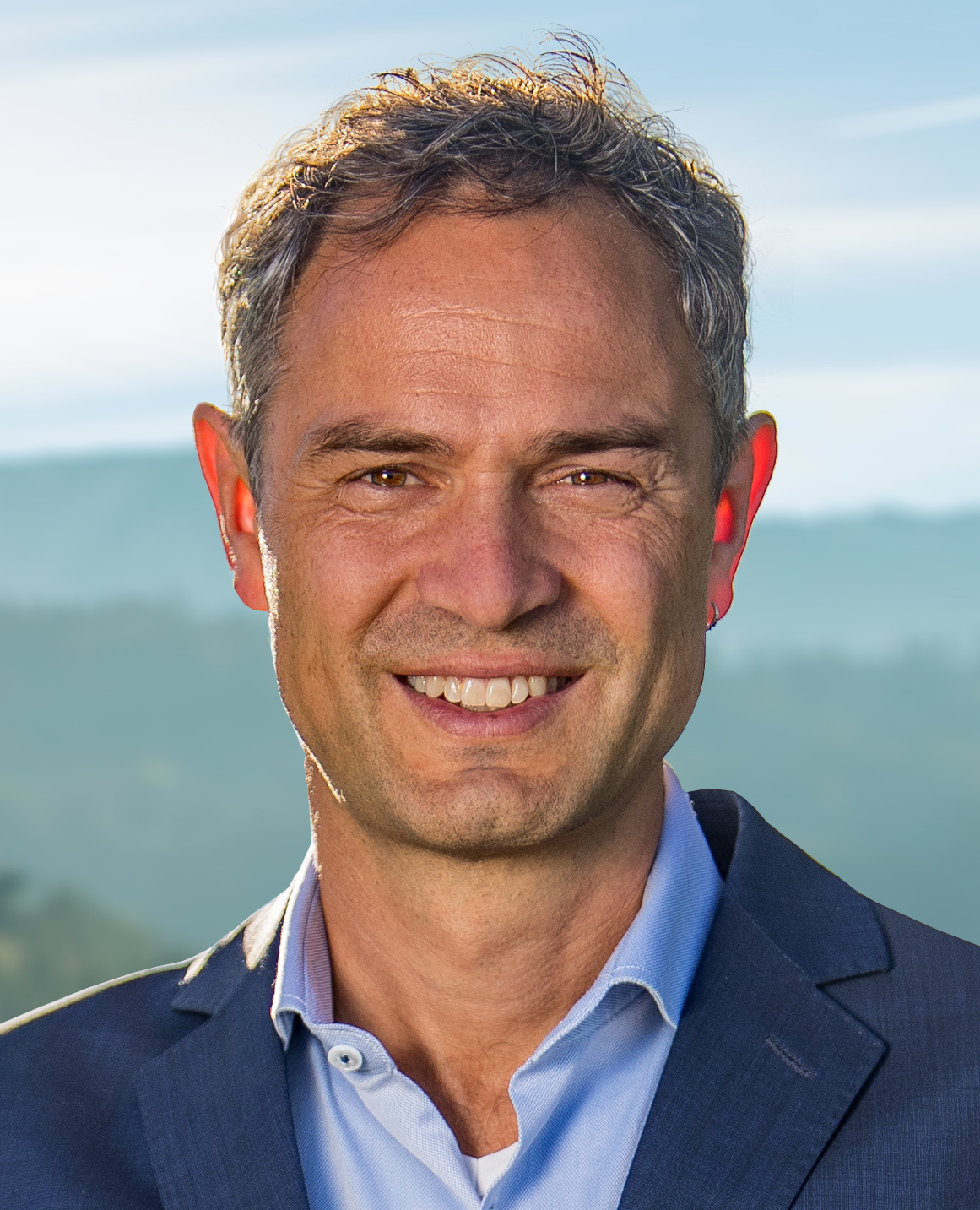
- Ganser in 2018
- Born: 29 August 1972 (age 54); Lugano, Ticino, Switzerland
- Education: University of Basel
- Occupation: Author
- Known for: NATO's Secret Armies
- Spouse: Bea Schwarz
- Children: 2
- Website: danieleganser.ch

Daniele Ganser (born 29 August 1972) is a Swiss author. He is described by Americanist Michael Butter as the "best-known conspiracy theorist in the German-speaking world". He is best known for his 2005 book NATO's Secret Armies: Operation GLADIO and Terrorism in Western Europe.

Ganser was a senior researcher at the ETH Zurich Center for Security Studies (CSS) and was president (2006–2012) of the Swiss branch of the Association for the Study of Peak Oil and Gas. He taught a course titled History and Future of Energy Systems at the University of St. Gallen from 2012 to 2017. His public doubts about the September 11 attacks led to the termination of his university employment.

== Early life ==
Ganser was born in Lugano to Gottfried Ganser-Bosshart (1922–2014), a Protestant pastor of the Federation of Swiss Protestant Churches, and Jeannette Ganser, a nurse. His father's parents were German. He studied at the University of Basel.

== NATO's Secret Armies ==
In 2004, Ganser published NATO's Secret Armies: Operation Gladio and Terrorism in Western Europe, in which he argued that Gladio units cooperated closely with NATO and the CIA, and that the Italian Gladio network was responsible for terrorist attacks against civilians. Security analyst John Prados observed that Ganser presented evidence that Gladio networks amounted to anti-democratic elements across many nations. Lawrence Kaplan commended Ganser for "heroic efforts to tease out the many strands that connect this interlocking right-wing conspiracy", but argued that connecting the dots required a stretch of facts and that some theories damaged the book's credibility.

The book received substantial criticism from scholars of intelligence history. Beatrice Heuser praised the work but noted it would have benefited from a less polemical tone. Peer Henrik Hansen criticised Ganser for basing claims on the US Army Field Manual 30-31B, which intelligence community members have described as a "Cold War era hoax document". Philip H.J. Davies concluded that the book was marred by exaggerated notions and misunderstandings of covert operations, and that Ganser had not performed the basic research necessary to discuss them effectively. Olav Riste of the Norwegian Institute for Defence Studies stated that his own research on the stay-behind network in Norway had been misrepresented by Ganser. Riste and Leopoldo Nuti concluded that the book's "ambitious conclusions do not seem to be entirely corroborated by a sound evaluation of the sources available." John R. Schindler wrote that specialists largely considered the book "shoddy" scholarship, noting that Ganser had acknowledged being unable to find official sources supporting his central charges. Political scientist Markus Linden said that Ganser fostered anti-Americanism under the label of Peace Research while presenting Russia in a unilaterally positive light.

Ganser appeared as an expert in the German television documentary Stay Behind: Die Schattenkrieger der NATO by Ulrich Stoll, broadcast on ZDFinfo in 2014.

== Later career and public commentary ==
Ganser has questioned the conclusions of the 9/11 Commission. He has also promoted skepticism of the COVID-19 pandemic. In 2020, Ganser published Imperium USA: Die Skrupellose Weltmacht, republished in English in 2023 as USA: The Ruthless Empire. Jakob Kullik, writing in the German strategic studies journal Zeitschrift für Strategische Analysen, criticised the book for its "one-sided" and "superficial" portrayal of the United States as the sole perpetrator of global conflicts, arguing that it lacked analytical depth, ignored counter-evidence, and fell short of popular science standards.

Regarding the Russian invasion of Ukraine, Ganser has stated that while the invasion is illegal, the United States bears responsibility for it, and that Ukrainian President Volodymyr Zelenskyy is a pawn of the United States. He has also claimed that the United States instigated the Euromaidan revolution in 2014 and installed Arseniy Yatsenyuk and Petro Poroshenko in power after the removal of Viktor Yanukovych.

=== Public presentations ===
As of 2023, Ganser gives large-scale public presentations in German-speaking countries, attracting audiences of over 1,000 people. German public broadcaster ZDF reported that these events can generate around 80,000 euros per night in ticket revenue, while Swiss public broadcasting reported that a presentation in Basel in May 2023 generated over 100,000 Swiss francs.

German media outlets have characterised the content of these presentations as containing anti-Americanism, historical negationism, and Kremlin propaganda. NDR Fernsehen reported that his content is popular among "conspiracy theorists and democracy skeptics". Joachim Krause, director of the Institute for Defence Policy at Kiel University, described Ganser as "not a scientist" but rather "a dumbing down entrepreneur who makes his living by contaminating the brains of people with conspiracy fantasies". Eva Binder and Magdalena Kaltseis of the University of Innsbruck described one of his presentations as "pseudoscientific seduction".

== Publications ==
=== English ===
Articles

- "Terrorism in Western Europe: An Approach to NATO's Secret Stay-behind Armies." Whitehead Journal of Diplomacy and International Relations, vol. 6, no. 1. pp. 69–97.
- "Fear As A Weapon: The Effects Psychological Warfare on Domestic and International Politics." World Affairs: The Journal of International Issues, vol. 9, no. 4 (2005), pp. 24–40. JSTOR 48531828.
- "The British Secret Service in Neutral Switzerland: An Unfinished Debate on NATO's Cold War Stay-behind Armies." Intelligence and National Security, vol. 20, no. 5 (2005). pp. 553–580.doi:10.1080/02684520500425083.
- "The Ghost of Machiavelli: An Approach to Operation Gladio and Terrorism in Cold War Italy." Crime, Law and Social Change, vol. 45, no. 2 (Mar. 2006), pp. 111–154. doi:10.3929/ethz-b-000036044.
- "The CIA in Western Europe and the Abuse of Human Rights." Intelligence and National Security, vol. 21, no. 5 (Oct. 2006), pp. 760–781. doi:10.1080/02684520600957712.

Books

- Reckless Gamble—The Sabotage of the United Nations in the Cuban Conflict and the Missile Crisis of 1962. New Orleans: University Press of the South (Dec. 2000). ISBN 978-1889431727.
- NATO's Secret Armies: Operation Gladio and Terrorism in Western Europe. London: Routledge (2005). ISBN 978-1135767853.

Book contributions

- "The 'Strategy of Tension' in the Cold War Period" (Chapter 6). In: 9/11 and the American Empire: Intellectuals Speak Out. Edited by David Ray Griffin and Peter Dale Scott. Northampton, Mass.: Olive Branch Press (2007), pp. 79–99. ISBN 978-1566566599.
- "America is Addicted to Oil: U.S. Secret Warfare and Dwindling Oil Reserves in the Context of Peak Oil and 9/11." In: The Dual State: Parapolitics, Carl Schmitt and the National Security Complex, by Eric Wilson. UK: Ashgate (2012). ISBN 978-1409431077.

=== Other languages ===
Articles

- "L'OTAN Menace Notre Sécurité," with Hans von Sponeck and Gabriel Galice. Le Temps [Genèva] (3 April 2017), pp. 6+.

Books

- Der Alleingang—Die Schweiz 10 Jahre nach dem EWR-Nein, with Uwe Wagschal and Hans Rentsch. Zürich: Orell Füssli Verlag (Dec. 2002). ISBN 978-3280050415.
- Europa im Erdölrausch: Die Folgen einer gefährlichen Abhängigkeit. Zürich: Orell Füssli Verlag (2012). ISBN 978-3280054741.
- Illegale Kriege: Wie die NATO-Länder die UNO sabotieren. Eine Chronik von Kuba bis Syrien. Zürich: Orell Füssli Verlag (2016). ISBN 978-3280039434.
- Imperium USA: Die Skrupellose Weltmacht. Zürich: Orell Füssli Verlag (2020). ISBN 978-3280090886.

Book contributions

- "Peak Oil: Erdöl im Spannungsfeld von Krieg und Frieden." In: Energie, by Phillip Rudolf von Rohr, Peter Walde, Bertram Battlog. vdf Hochschulverlag an der ETH Zürich (2009), pp. 45–60. ISBN 978-3728132192.
