= Projekt-26 =

Former stay-behind army in Switzerland

Projekt-26, best known as P-26, was a stay-behind army in Switzerland charged with countering a possible invasion of the country. The existence of P-26 (along with P-27) as secret intelligence agencies dissimulated in the military intelligence agency (UNA) was revealed in November 1990 by the PUK EMD Parliamentary Commission headed by senator Carlo Schmid. The commission, whose initial aim was to investigate the alleged presence of secret files on citizens constituted in the Swiss Ministry of Defence, was created in March 1990 in the wake of the Fichenaffäre or Secret Files Scandal, during which it had been discovered that the federal police, BUPO, had maintained files on 900,000 persons (out of a population of 7 million).

Since the existence of P-26 was revealed a month after similar revelations made in Italy by the premier Giulio Andreotti, who disclosed to the Italian Parliament the existence, throughout the Cold War, of a Gladio stay-behind anti-communist paramilitary network headed by NATO and present in most European countries, Switzerland formed a parliamentary commission charged with investigating alleged links between P-26 and similar stay-behind organizations. It was one of the three countries, along with Belgium and Italy, to create a parliamentary commission on these stay-behind armies.

On November 21, 1990, Swiss authorities declared the dissolution of P-26, since the clandestine organization operated outside of parliamentary and even governmental control, being an autonomous structure hidden inside the secret military services.

== Stay-behind plans during World War II ==
As the United Kingdom prepared itself for a Nazi invasion during World War II, they created the stay-behind Auxiliary Units, separate from the Home Guard. Switzerland also prepared for such an eventuality, as its neutrality did not constitute a sufficient guarantee against an invasion by Nazi Germany or Fascist Italy. Thus, General Henri Guisan put in place the National Redoubt, a plan in which the military was to retreat to the highest parts of the Alps, abandoning the plains to the enemy. From there, a guerrilla war would be launched against the invader.

== Stay-behind in the Territorial Service ==
With the end of World War II and the official beginning of the Cold War, plans were made to prepare for an invasion by the Soviet Union. The PUK EMD Commission headed by Carlo Schmid discovered that a first stay-behind branch was created within the Swiss army in the Territorialdienst (Territorial Service). This military branch was considered best suited for this mission, as it was not trained to fight in the front but to carry out domestic police operations among the civilian population. However, the PUK EMD Commission was confronted by the destruction of many documents pertaining to these early stay-behind organisations:

The historical record is fragmentary, because almost all documents of the resistance organization of the 1950s, 1960s, and 1970s were destroyed around 1980.

The first commander of this secret unit was Divisionär Franz Wey (1896–1963), who was succeeded by Burger, Amstutz and de Pury. The latter was promoted to Brigadier-General and Chief of the Territorial Service.

In December 1956, following the Suez Crisis and the crushing of the Budapest insurrection, Erwin Jaeckle asked in Parliament what "preparations can be taken in the fields of organisation and training in order to take up and secure total popular resistance, if necessary also outside the framework of the army." A year later, in September 1957, Defence Minister Paul Chaudet, successor to Karl Kobelt (both members of the liberal FDP), replied that "The events in Hungary — seen from a military perspective only — have shown that the battle of a resistance movement alone can not be successful." He added that "This battle poses problems of a political and military nature, as well as juridical concerns in the context of international law and the conventions that we have signed." Finally, Claudet declared that "Although certain measures have been envisaged by the Territorial Service in this area, the possibilities in this field are limited."

Swiss Major Hans von Dach published in 1958 Der totale Widerstand, Kleinkriegsanleitung für jedermann ("Total Resistance," Bienne, 1958) concerning guerrilla warfare, a book of 180 pages about passive and active resistance to a foreign invasion, including detailed instructions on sabotage, clandestinity, methods to dissimulate weapons, struggle against police moles, etc.

A former, unnamed, Chief of Staff, declared in 1990 to the Swiss deputies that senior officers of the Swiss military, then led by Chief of Staff Louis de Montmollion, had taken Jaeckle's declined request as the legal basis for the organization of the stay-behind.

== Stay-behind in the UNA ==
The stay-behind army was moved in 1967 from the Territorial Service to the UNA, the military intelligence agency, directed by Divisionär Richard Ochsner.
It changed its codename to "Special Service," which was made up of three hierarchical levels:

1. The top level consisted of members of the regular military.
2. The second level was made up of "trusted persons" who recruited activists.
3. These activists formed the third level.

According to the PUK EMD Commission:

The persons recruited by the trusted men could themselves recruit a number of new members to join the resistance organisation; therefore, the exact number of members of the organisation is not known ... They are said to have been 1.000 at maximum, divided among 30 to 50 centres.

In 1973, the Swiss Federal Council formulated the national security strategy of the country, which included the need for resistance in occupied territory. It reported that

The occupation of the country must not mean that all resistance has ended. Even in this case, an enemy shall meet not only with aversion, but also active resistance.

It also highlighted that:

Guerrilla war and non-violent resistance in occupied areas are being prepared within the limits of international law, and will, if necessary, be carried out.

In a similar manner, the introduction of Der Totale Widerstand (Total Resistance) by Hans von Dach (1958) stated that "of course," the guerrilla methods (which involved various covert actions) were to respect the Hague Conventions on Laws and Customs of War on Land (1899) as well as the four Geneva Conventions of 1949.

At the time, Colonel Heinrich Amstutz commanded the stay-behind. He was replaced in 1976 by Colonel Albert Bachmann. The next year, Hans Senn became Chief of Staff of the Swiss armed forces, and reported on 5 September 1979 to the united seven Swiss Federal councilors on the activities of UNA and of the stay-behind units. He informed them that the stay-behind cost one million Swiss Francs a year, which were secretly invested. The councilors listened in silence, and their absence of objection was interpreted by Hans Senn as an implicit approval of the operation, in which they conserved the possibility of plausible denial.

The UNA was discovered in the midst of the Bachmann-Schilling affair in November 1979, when Special Service commander Albert Bachmann sent UNA agent Kurt Schilling to Austria to observe military manoeuvres. There, he was arrested and sentenced for espionage by Austrian authorities, before being sent back to Switzerland, and sentenced again for having revealed classified information. A parliamentary commission was formed to investigate UNA, and reported in 1981:

According to the security policy of the federation, the Special Service has the task of creating favourable conditions for active resistance in Switzerland against an occupying force.

The report concluded that the task was legitimate, although "the internal control of these two services was insufficient."

== Stay-behind as P-26 ==
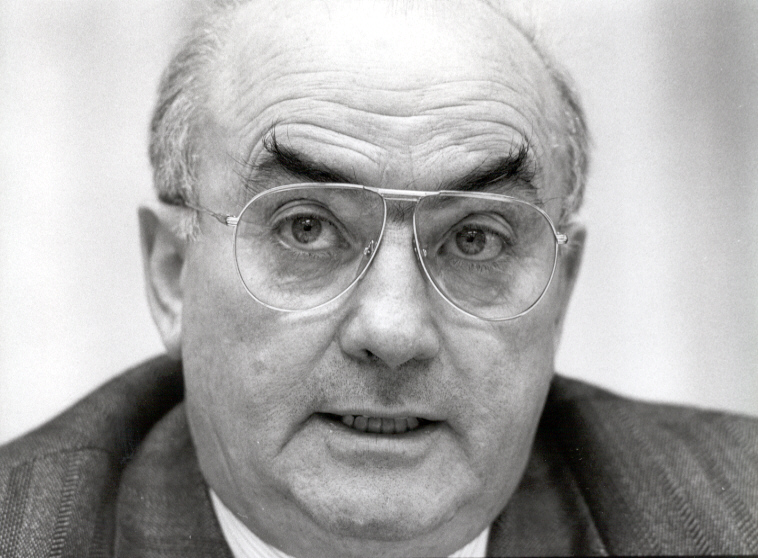
Efrem Cattelan (1990)

Following this event, which led to the resignation of Colonel Bachmann, the stay-behind was recreated, under the code-name P-26. Defence Minister Georges-André Chevallaz gave his approval to Chief of Staff Hans Senn and UNA director Richard Ochsner. Bachmann was replaced by Colonel Efrem Cattelan, who headed the paramilitary organization starting in October 1979. The code-name alluded to paragraph 426 of the Security and Defence concept of the Federal Council of 27 June 1973, which stated the needs of "active resistance." (See above).

== Murder of Herbert Alboth ==
During the investigations concerning the secret files scandal and P-26, Herbert Alboth, a former member of staff of the Spezialdienst (special service) until 1976, was assassinated on April 18, 1990, in his flat in Liebefeld near Bern. A short time before, he had written to the MP Kaspar Villiger, on March 1, proposing to reveal all that he knew on the stay-behind. The press reported that Alboth had been "killed with his own military bayonet" with "several stabs to the stomach," while "on the chest of the victim the medical examiners have found a set of characters which were written in felt pen and puzzle the investigators." His death was never resolved, while the Swiss deputies discovered in his flat pictures of senior P-26 members, old documents on training and courses, exercise plans of a conspiratorial character and address list of former members of the "Special Service."

== The Cornu Report ==
Following the November 1990 report by the Parliamentary Commission, the Swiss Socialist Party and the Greens requested further investigations concerning alleged ties between P-26 and other Gladio stay-behind organizations. Judge Pierre Cornu was charged with the investigation, and delivered a 100-page report known as the "Cornu Report." He met Italian and Belgian MPs, as well as P-26 members, but London declined to comment (the existence of MI6 was still un-confirmed by Britain).

The Cornu Report stated that P-26 was without "political or legal legitimacy", and described the group's collaboration with British secret services as "intense":

Unknown to the Swiss government, British officials signed agreements with the organisation, called P26, to provide training in combat, communications, and sabotage. The latest agreement was signed in 1987… P26 cadres participated regularly in training exercises in Britain… British advisers — possibly from the SAS — visited secret training establishments in Switzerland.

According to the account of the report from Richard Norton-Taylor, from The Guardian, "The activities of P-26, its codes, and the name of the leader of the group, Efrem Cattelan, were known to British intelligence, but the Swiss government was kept in the dark."

Despite parliamentary motions deposed by MP Josef Lang (in 2005) and by Lisa Mazzone (in 2008), both of which requested the full, non-censored, publication of the Cornu Report, large sections of the latter remained classified and the report will remain unpublished until 2041. Since Gladio stay-behind organizations were coordinated by secret organizations of SHAPE and ultimately responded to SACEUR, head of NATO in Europe, any relationship between P-26 and SACEUR would be an obvious breach of Swiss neutrality. Thus, the matter remains controversial and confidential. A 17-page summary, titled "P-26 not part of an international network," was published on 19 September 1991.

Confronted by a question from Socialist deputy Paul Rechsteiner on 30 September 1991, concerning the non-publication of the Cornu Report, Defence Minister Kaspar Villiger declared that:

The Cornu Report contains numerous pieces of information on foreign secret services and resistance organisations, as well as their structures, hierarchies, and connections ... The Cornu Report will not be released and published because it is not the business of the Federal Council to reveal the secret affairs of foreign states.

To that, Socialist MP Susanne Leutenegger-Oberholzer replied: "is the Council not of the opinion that it is deplorable if foreign secret services receive more information than, for instance, Swiss parliamentarians?"

== Actions of the P-26 and alleged international contacts ==
However, according to an ETH university study by Daniele Ganser, "P26 was not directly involved in the network of NATO's secret armies but it had close contact to MI6," the British secret service which worked closely with the Central Intelligence Agency during the Cold War and trained Gladio paramilitaries in Italy.

While responding to a question in Parliament concerning the assassination of Herbert Alboth (related to the discovery of P-26), National counsellor Remo Gysin has described the relations between the Swiss stay-behind, MI6 and NATO as "notorious".

Like other stay-behind organizations in Europe, P-26 had weapons caches in Switzerland, while some of its members took paramilitary and guerrilla warfare training courses with the MI6 in Great Britain. Foreign instructors also followed courses in Switzerland with P-26.

Swiss military instructor Alois Hürlimann revealed that he had taken part in secret military training in England, which he said included a real assault on an Irish Republican Army (IRA) arms depot, in which at least one IRA member was killed.

In 1976, Colonel Bachmann, head of the Special Service, allegedly reached a mutual cooperation agreement with the British SAS.

British Field Marshal Bernard Montgomery, Deputy Supreme Commander of NATO forces in Europe from 1951 to 1958, was in the Bernese Oberland each February from 1946 to 1962, for military affairs. He met in 1946 Swiss Defence Minister Karl Kobelt, Foreign Minister Max Petitpierre and Chief of Staff Louis de Montmollin to discuss Swiss neutrality and strategy in the post-war period. According to research by Swiss historian Mauro Mantovani, Montgomery met Montmollin again in February 1952 to discuss plans in case of a Soviet invasion. They agreed that in case of an emergency, Switzerland would need help from NATO, leading Mantovani to conclude that:

Switzerland during the Cold War was so obviously part of the western camp that western leaders could only wish that all neutrals would take Switzerland as an example.

Italian magistrate Felice Casson, who first discovered Gladio in Italy, declared: "I am sure that I also saw documents on Gladio contacts with Switzerland" in the Palazzo Braschi in Rome, headquarters of the SISMI military intelligence agency.

Furthermore, P-26 used Harpoon radios, a powerful encrypted communication system, which was used by the Belgian stay-behind network as discovered by the Belgian Parliamentary Commission. The Harpoon system, bought by NATO from the German firm AEG Telefunken in the beginning of the 1980s, permitted stay-behind members to send encrypted radio messages across 6.000 km, thus enabling them to maintain relations between themselves. This system is not compatible with the standard communication system used by the Swiss army. However, magistrate Pierre Cornu found that in 1987, P-26 had connected foreign stations of the Harpoon system for around 15 million Swiss francs. Historian Daniele Ganser observed that:

The purchase of the Harpoon equipment linked to NATO command centres in Brussels, the CIA in the US, and MI6 in Great Britain realised the integration of the Swiss stay-behind in the European stay-behind network at a very basic, hardware level.

On 13 March 1991, Socialist MP Esther Bührer asked in a parliamentary request to the Federal Council if members of P-26 had been involved in the "Kaiseraugst" sabotage operations, which had occurred in 1975 during anti-nuclear protests against the establishment of a nuclear plant in Kaiseraugst, near Basel. Between 1974 and 1984, more than 30 sabotage operations had been carried out there, and investigations were abandoned without results, although they pointed that they had been "professional" operations. Defence Minister Kaspar Villiger denied any involvement. The left-wing weekly WOZ Die Wochenzeitung also declared the request unlikely, as some violent anti-nuclear protesters had allegedly taken credit for the sabotage operations.

Former MP Helmut Hubacher, president of the Social Democratic Party of Switzerland from 1975 to 1990, declared that the existence of P-26 was more disturbing than what professional soldiers alleged it was, since it was not only to counter a possible Soviet invasion, but also had a mandate to become active should the left win the elections and gain parliamentary majority.

== P-27 Files ==
Beside P-26, the military intelligence agency also dissimulated P-27, charged with domestic surveillance. According to Richard Norton-Taylor from The Guardian:

P26 was backed by P27, a private foreign intelligence agency funded partly by the government, and by a special unit of Swiss army intelligence which had built up files on nearly 8,000 "suspect persons" including "leftists", "bill stickers", "Jehovah's witnesses", people with "abnormal tendencies" and anti-nuclear demonstrators. On November 14, the Swiss government hurriedly dissolved P26 — the head of which, it emerged, had been paid £100,000 a year.

== See also ==
- STC/Mob (Section Training Communication and Mobilisation), Belgian equivalent
- Operatiën & Inlichtingen (O&I), Dutch equivalent
- Operation Condor
- Operation Gladio
- Secret files scandal

== Bibliography ==
- The British Secret Service in neutral Switzerland, Daniele Ganser, in Intelligence and National Security, Vol.20, n°4, December 2005, pp. 553–580
- Daniele Ganser (2005). NATO's Secret Armies: Operation GLADIO and Terrorism in Western Europe, London, Franck Cass. ISBN 0-7146-8500-3 (a quick resume available here)
- Bericht der Parlamentarischen Untersuchungskommission zur besonderen Klärung von Vorkommnissen von grosser Tragweite im Eidgenössischen Militärdepartement, Bern, 17 November 1990 (PUK EMD report)
- Short Cornu Report. The complete version remains classified.
- Bachmann 1981 Report from the Commission headed by MP Jean Pascal Delamuraz. Parts remained classified.
