= Stasi Arbeitsgruppe des Ministers S =

East German special forces unit

The Minister's Working Group/"S" (AGM/S) (German: Arbeitsgruppe des Ministers Aufgabenbereich "S") was a special forces unit under Stasi control. Its known mission was to combat terrorism in East Germany. However, its real mission was to serve as a paramilitary stay-behind organization trained to operate behind enemy lines.

Not much information is available, as most documents related to the unit were destroyed by 1989.

== History ==
The AGM/S was created in 1962, under the instruction of the East German Ministry of National Defence. From 1964 to 1984, around 3,500 personnel were reported to be recruited to the AGM/S.

In 1972, the AGM/S was trained to conduct black ops missions in West Germany for sabotage and assassinations by using criminal and terrorist tactics.

In 1975, an AGM/S delegation went to Vietnam in order to evaluate the experience of the Viet Cong during the Vietnam War. The delegation made requests to acquire American-made military uniforms and small arms. In 1981, Markus Wolf made a request to AGM/S to train around three or four employees from the HVA for special duty in special forces tactics.

On 1 April 1988, the AGM/S was renamed "Department XXIII" (anti terrorism) and on 1 March 1989 it was integrated into Department XXII (counter-terrorism).

In 2007, investigations were conducted to determine whether the Red Army Faction (RAF) had connections to the AGM/S at the time of the 1989 murder of Alfred Herrhausen. Research in Germany indicates that AGM/S was responsible for providing paramilitary training to the RAF. This training included the use of small arms, anti-tank weapons and explosives.

== Organization ==
Members of this unit were part of the anti-terrorist component of the Felix Dzerzhinsky Guards Regiment and were trained in Erkner on Rügen and in Teupitz. Parachute qualified units of the AGM/S are thought to include 2nd Reconnaissance Company (German: 2. Aufklärungskompanie) and two Stasi airborne agent units at Erkner, associated with the Dynamo Parachute Team at Rote Helene, Leipzig.

Most of its members were recruited from various elite East German special forces units. 623 full-time AGM/S personnel were assigned to task force units.

The AGM/S reported directly to Erich Mielke.

=== Duties ===
While the AGM/S was meant to train its forces in special forces tactics to create guerrilla units in case of an emergency, they also dispatched units to protect East German diplomatic buildings in the 1980s.

=== Commanders ===
The long-time head of the AGM/S was Stasi Major General Heinz Stocker, which is the accepted reason for the letter S in the name of the organization. Others indicate that the letter S means Special Tasks or Special Issues (Sonderfragen).

Colonel Günter Rosenow became head of the department XXIII in October 1988, after Stocker's illness-related resignation.

== See also ==
- Study and Training Group for Military Reconnaissance (Germany) - West German counterpart

== Bibliography ==
- Thomas Auerbach: Einsatzkommandos an der unsichtbaren Front – Terror- und Sabotagevorbereitungen des MfS gegen die Bundesrepublik Deutschland, Ch. Links Verlag, Berlin 1999.
- Dennis, Mike; Laporte, Norman (2003). The Stasi: Myth and Reality.
- Gieseke, Jens (2015). The History of the Stasi: East Germany's Secret Police, 1945-1990. New York: Berghahn Books. ISBN 978-1785330247.
- Koehler, John (2004). "East Germany: The Stasi and De-Stasification" (PDF). Demokratizatsiya. 12 (3): 369–395. Archived from the original (PDF) on 2019-08-01.
- Schmeidel, John Christian (2008). Stasi: Shield and Sword of the Party.
- Tobias Wunschik: Die Hauptabteilung XXII: "Terrorabwehr" . In: Anatomie der Staatssicherheit. MfS-Handbuch III/16, BStU, Berlin 1995. (PDF, 237 KB)
