= Riste =

Riste is a given name and surname. Notable people with the name include:

== Given name ==
- Riste Naumov (born 1981), Macedonian former football player
- Riste Pandev (born 1994), Macedonian sprinter
- Riste Stefanov (born 1983), Macedonian former basketball player

== Surname ==
- Olav Riste (1933–2015), Norwegian historian
