= Secret files scandal =

1989 scandal in Switzerland

First page of the file about the Swiss writer Max Frisch (in German)

The Fichenaffäre or Secret files scandal shook public opinion in Switzerland in 1989. That year, it was revealed that the Swiss federal authorities, as well as the cantonal police forces, had put in place a system of mass surveillance of the population.

== The scandal ==
Following allegations that within the Federal Department of Justice and Police (EJPD), the Bundespolizei (BUPO, now Swiss Federal Police) charged with domestic intelligence was illegally keeping secret files on both Swiss citizens and foreigners, a special parliamentary commission (PUK EJPD) was established. It gave its report in November 1989, demonstrating that the BUPO had kept more than 900,000 files in secret archives. Files targeted Eastern European nationals, but also Swiss citizens, organizations, firms, and various political groups, mostly on the left.

The scandal led to the reorganization of the BUPO, which since 1992 has been observed by a delegation of a Parliamentary Commission.

== Second commission and discovery of P-26 ==
Furthermore, similar allegations concerning the Defence Ministry and its UNA department (Untertruppe Nachrichtendienst und Abwehr) emerged, to the effect that they too were storing files. The Defence Department denied these charges, but a new parliamentary commission (PUK EMD) was formed in March 1990, under the direction of Senator Carlo Schmid, with the task of investigating the Defence Department. In November 1990, this second commission confirmed the existence of secret, illegal files, as well as revealing the existence of P-26, a secret stay-behind army, and a secret intelligence gathering unit called P-27, both hidden in the Swiss military secret service UNA. Only a month before, the Italian prime minister Giulio Andreotti had revealed the existence of Gladio, a NATO stay-behind network in all European countries.

== Transfer of files ==
The police files themselves were transferred to the Swiss Federal Archives. A jurist, René Bacher, was designated "special officer" to take care of the political scandal. 300,000 people requested to see their files following the revelation of their existence. The records are open to public access for historical research when the last entry is older than fifty years. More recent records may be open on request. Records on living people are closed to public access for reasons of confidentiality.

== 2005 trial ==
Left-wing activists had been the object of surveillance by Swiss authorities since the 20th century. In 2005, a Swiss trade-unionist indicted for having blocked public transport in Geneva was surprised to see that the police files contained all of his activities since 1965, although he had never been indicted before. The court had asked the police for his file. Rémy Pagani, also a member of the Syndicat des services publics (SSP, Public Services Trade-Union) and MP for the Alliance de gauche (Left-wing coalition, a party based in Geneva), confirmed during the same trial that the file listed his presence in demonstrations where he had not been arrested, as well as his participation in the occupation of a building in support of Nelson Mandela, although he had not been arrested for this act either.

According to Rémy Pagani, Bernard Ziegler, state counsellor in Geneva, had ensured after the files scandal that only those files containing information on crimes for which the citizen had been convicted would be kept. However, the 2005 trial showed that it had not been the case.

== See also ==
- Card index affair (national card index database kept by the Public Prosecutor's Office of Switzerland - see Case of Amman v. Switzerland at the European Court of Human Rights, 16 February 2000
- P-26
- Gladio
- Mass surveillance
- Parliamentary Inquiry Committee in Switzerland
