= Parliamentary Inquiry Committee in Switzerland =

Swiss parliamentary body

Example of a PUK report, here regarding incidents in the FDJP in 1989

The Parliamentary Investigation Committee (In German, Parlamentarische Untersuchungskommission, or PUK) is a temporary committee formed by parliamentarians within Switzerland's political system. It exercises political oversight over the government, administration, or judiciary in exceptional cases of significant importance to investigate controversial incidents. After issuing its final report, the committee is dissolved. PUKs exist at the federal, cantonal, and, in some cases, municipal levels. Their findings are presented in a report. The establishment of a PUK is regulated by law at all levels.

== Federal level ==
=== Legal basis and establishment ===
Under Article 169, Paragraph 1 of the Federal Constitution, the Federal Assembly oversees the activities of the Federal Council, the federal administration, federal courts, and other entities tasked with federal duties. To fulfill this role, it may establish a Parliamentary Investigation Committee (PUK) to investigate incidents of major significance. The establishment, organization, procedures, and powers of a PUK are governed by the Parliament Act. A PUK can be requested by a parliamentary group, a committee, the office of the National Council or the Council of States, or individual council members through a parliamentary initiative or a motion. Following consultation with the Federal Council, a PUK is established by a simple federal decree, which defines the committee’s mandate and financial resources and requires approval from both chambers. The committee comprises an equal number of members from each chamber, elected by the respective offices based on proposals from parliamentary groups. The offices also elect a president from one chamber and a vice-president from the other. The PUK has its own secretariat, staffed by the Parliamentary Services, and may hire additional personnel.

=== Powers and procedures ===
A PUK has the same information access rights as the supervisory committees’ delegations (Management Delegation, Finance Delegation). These rights are extensive; no confidentiality obligations can be invoked against a PUK. All requested documents, including minutes and records of Federal Council meetings, must be provided. A PUK may question individuals—both within and outside the federal administration—as informants or witnesses, summon those obligated to provide information, and, in cases of unjustified absence, have them brought in by the police. The committee may appoint an investigator to assist with evidence collection. The PUK’s powers regarding document access, questioning, and fact-finding exceed those of the standing supervisory committees (Management Committees and Finance Committees) of both chambers.

Federal and cantonal authorities are required to provide administrative and legal assistance to a PUK.

The PUK submits its findings and recommendations for addressing identified shortcomings in a report to the Federal Assembly. Both chambers discuss the report separately and decide on the PUK’s recommendations (in the form of parliamentary initiatives, motions, or postulates). Before finalizing its report, the PUK must grant individuals facing allegations access to relevant parts of the draft report and an opportunity to respond (Audi alteram partem). Evidence not disclosed to the affected person cannot be used against them. The Federal Council may comment on the investigation’s findings both within the PUK and in a separate report to the Federal Assembly.

=== PUKs established to date ===
==== National and Council of States committees on the “Mirage affair” (1964) ====
In 1961, the Federal Assembly approved the Federal Council’s request to procure 100 Mirage fighter jets for CHF 871 million. In 1964, when the Federal Council requested an additional CHF 576 million, the significant cost overrun sparked widespread outrage.

On June 10, 1964, the National Council decided to establish a special committee to “determine the reasons for the failure and the responsibility of all involved administrative bodies” and to “reassess the relationship between the Federal Council and Parliament regarding the oversight duties of the people’s representatives over the government.” On June 17, 1964, the Council of States followed suit, assigning the same mandate to its expanded Military Committee. Both chambers granted these committees the right to “consult all involved administrative bodies, access all necessary documents, and engage experts to clarify the facts and determine responsibilities,” effectively prefiguring the later legal framework for PUKs. The two committees merged and issued a joint report on September 1, 1964.

Based on the analysis of deficiencies revealed in the Mirage procurement, Parliament tasked the Federal Council with reorganizing the Federal Military Department. Additionally, it decided to strengthen parliamentary oversight of the Federal Council and administration by expanding the Management Committees and establishing a legal framework for future PUKs.

==== Parliamentary Investigation Committee on “Incidents in the FDJP” (PUK FDJP; 1989/1990) ====
In late 1988, the Shakarchi company, where Hans W. Kopp, husband of Federal Councillor Elisabeth Kopp, served on the board, became implicated in money laundering investigations related to illegal drug trafficking proceeds. When the Federal Councillor learned of this through confidential official sources, she warned her husband. When this alleged breach of official secrecy became public, she faced intense media and political pressure, leading to her resignation announcement on December 12, 1988, effective at the end of February 1989.

On January 31, 1989, the Federal Assembly established a PUK to investigate the “administration of the Federal Department of Justice and Police (FDJP), particularly the Office of the Attorney General, to clarify allegations related to the department head’s administration and resignation” and to examine “the actions of federal authorities and agencies in combating money laundering and international drug trafficking.” The PUK uncovered the “Secret files scandal” by investigating extensive data collections maintained by the Political Police of the Attorney General’s Office for state security purposes. It revealed that individuals, particularly those perceived as left-leaning, were monitored using legally questionable methods, resulting in significant professional disadvantages due to interventions by the Attorney General’s Office with employers.

As a result of the PUK’s findings (report dated November 22, 1989), Parliament issued several mandates to the Federal Council, including reorganizing the Attorney General’s Office. On the PUK’s initiative, the Management Delegation of the Federal Assembly was established in 1992 to oversee state security and intelligence services with the same unrestricted access rights as a PUK.

The PUK was chaired by National Councillor Moritz Leuenberger (elected to the Federal Council in 1995), with Josi Meier as vice-president from the Council of States.

==== Parliamentary Investigation Committee on “Incidents in the FDM” (PUK FDM; 1990) ====
The PUK FDJP received indications regarding irregularities in the Federal Military Department (FDM) but could not investigate due to its limited mandate. On March 12, 1990, the Federal Assembly established the PUK FDM to examine “the activities of groups, subgroups, and offices within the Federal Military Department involved in intelligence services, counterintelligence, emergency preparedness, and personnel file management.” The investigation centered on the secret cadre organization P-26, which prepared Switzerland’s resistance in case of foreign occupation without legal basis or sufficient political oversight, and the extraordinary intelligence service P-27. The PUK found that these services lacked legal foundations, were inadequately supervised by the politically responsible Federal Council, and prevented Parliament from exercising its constitutional oversight role.

Based on the PUK’s findings (report dated November 20, 1990), Parliament issued mandates to the Federal Council, including terminating the P-Association’s activities and addressing illegal conditions in military intelligence services.

==== Parliamentary Investigation Committee on organizational and management issues at the Federal Pension Fund (PUK FPF; 1995/1996) ====
Since the early 1980s, the Federal Pension Fund (FPF) had faced significant issues in leadership, organization, IT, and finances. Approximately 40,000 policyholder dossiers were defective. The Swiss Federal Audit Office had not certified the fund’s accounts as proper since 1998. On October 17, 1995, the Federal Assembly established a PUK to investigate “the organization and administration of the Federal Pension Fund (FPF) and the administration of the Federal Department of Finance (EAD) in relation to the FPF.” In its report, dated October 3, 1996, the PUK found that the Federal Council had “had practically done nothing for years to address the serious deficiencies” and assigned primary responsibility to Federal Councillor Otto Stich as head of the EFD.

The PUK developed numerous recommendations for improving IT systems. Based on the report, Parliament issued several mandates to the Federal Council, including reviewing a better organizational structure for the pension fund and drafting legislative amendments to enhance the independence of the Swiss Federal Audit Office. Parliament also improved its own oversight procedures, such as better coordination among control committees, enhanced document access rights for the Management Committees, and making mandates to the Federal Council more binding.

The PUK was chaired by Fritz Schiesser from the Council of States, with National Councillor Simon Epiney as vice-president.

==== Parliamentary Investigation Committee on the CS emergency merger (2023) ====
On March 19, 2023, the Federal Council, based on an emergency ordinance and with the approval of the Finance Delegation, authorized urgent loans of CHF9 billion for UBS and CHF100 billion for the Swiss National Bank (SNB) to facilitate UBS's takeover of the struggling Credit Suisse. In an extraordinary session on April 11–12, 2023, the Federal Assembly rejected these loans, but the decision had no legal effect as the Federal Council had already entered binding commitments. On June 8, 2023, the Federal Assembly established a PUK to investigate the circumstances surrounding the emergency merger. Isabelle Chassot and Franziska Ryser were elected as president and vice-president, respectively, with the committee comprising members from all parliamentary groups.

On December 20, 2024, the PUK published its report, holding Credit Suisse’s management responsible for the loss of confidence and economic instability. The board and executive management had repeatedly ignored directives from the Swiss Financial Market Supervisory Authority and acted "defiantly". While political authorities were not found to have committed causal misconduct, the information policy of then-Finance Minister Ueli Maurer was criticized for hindering the Federal Council’s work. The investigation led to twenty recommendations and several initiatives to improve governance and crisis management in Switzerland.

=== Unsuccessful requests for PUK establishment (since 1995) ===
Since the establishment of the PUK on the Federal Pension Fund (FPF) on October 17, 1995, 31 parliamentary initiatives and one motion requesting a PUK have been submitted (as of March 17, 2023), all unsuccessfully. Twenty-nine initiatives failed in the National Council. One initiative and one motion, both calling for a PUK to investigate the administration of the Federal Council, federal administration, Swiss Financial Market Supervisory Authority, and Swiss National Bank during the 2008 financial crisis (particularly the rescue of UBS rescue through emergency law in October 2008 and the release of UBS client data to the USA in February 2009), were approved by the National Council in 2010 but rejected by the Council of States.

The reasons for these failures include the existence of an alternative since 1992, when the Management Delegation was granted the same information access rights as a PUK. Additionally, most PUK requests came from either right- or left-wing parliamentary groups (twelve from the SVP group, ten from the SP group, eight from the Green group): “In Switzerland, a PUK is an instrument of a broad parliamentary majority against a government that has lost parliamentary support on a specific issue. Accordingly, PUK requests primarily serving one political camp (e.g., the right or left) have little chance of success, as they are unlikely to secure a majority of council members.”

== Cantonal and municipal levels ==
Most cantonal parliaments (except those in Appenzell Innerrhoden, St. Gallen, and Thurgau) can establish a Parliamentary Investigation Committee (PUK) to investigate incidents of major significance. The procedures for establishment and the committee’s powers largely align with federal regulations.

Several parliaments of larger municipalities, such as Bern, Zurich, Zug, Frauenfeld, Kriens, Opfikon, and Riehen, can also establish PUKs.

Examples:

- Grand Council of the Canton of Bern: PUK Bernese Teachers’ Insurance Fund, 2004/2005
- Grand Council of the Canton of Graubünden: PUK Construction Cartel, 2021
- Municipal Council of the City of Zürich: PUK on incidents involving the Zürich Waste and Recycling Department, 2021

== See also ==
In Germany and Austria, the Parliamentary Investigation Committee corresponds to the investigative committee.
