= Committee of inquiry =

Committee of inquiry could refer to:

- Committee for Skeptical Inquiry
- Parliamentary inquiry committee
- Anglo-American Committee of Inquiry
