= Study and Training Group for Military Reconnaissance (Germany) =

The Study and Training Group for Military Reconnaissance (German: Lehr- und Ausbildungsgruppe für das Fernspähwesen der Bundeswehr; LAFBw) was a highly classified clandestine unit of the foreign intelligence agency of Germany, Bundesnachrichtendienst (BND) from 1964 to 1979.

== History ==
Stay-behind units were formed in occupied West Germany right after World War II by the British, US and French intelligence services in their respective sectors as well as the Dutch and Danish in northern West Germany. The running of these Stay-behind organizations (SBOs) was coordinated with the Organization Gehlen, which later became the Bundesnachrichtendienst (BND), the West German foreign intelligence service.

In 1956, the BND took over these networks and merged them into one SBO, the Lehr- und Ausbildungsgruppe für das Fernspähwesen der Bundeswehr (LAFBw) or Teaching and Training Group for Long Range Reconnaissance of the German Armed Forces.

The STGMR was founded as the Special tasks unit 404/III within the BND and used the military name as a cover. It was officially disbanded in 1979.

== Duties ==
In the state of defence, the unit's task would have been tasked with secret operations as a Stay-behind unit. The planned role of BND-led Stay-behind units during the early phase of a Warsaw Pact invasion would have been marginal. Stay-behind agents were instructed to survive an invasion, and to lie low and quiet during the early occupation phases. Plans called for at least 500 LAFBw personnel in case of a conflict.

Only in what the BND described as the third phase, ‘every-day/routine occupation’, would they start sending messages, recruit fighters, and then conduct ‘massive sabotage operations’. These operations included partisan warfare against occupying forces, smuggling of equipment and personnel, reconnaissance and training BND and Bundeswehr personnel in commando warfare.

In the 1980s, the BND tried to regain one of its stay-behind missions to assist friendly aircrew to escape from Warsaw Pact-led forces by conducting SAR ops.

== Organization ==
=== Training ===
The unit's training was conducted by the Bundeswehr, the Bundesgrenzschutz, and the US Army's 10th Special Forces Group in Bad Tölz.

== See also ==
- Stasi Arbeitsgruppe des Ministers S - intelligence unit in East Germany with similar tasks
- Operation Gladio - NATO-sponsored stay-behind network in Europe
