= CIA activities in Italy =

The Central Intelligence Agency (CIA) has been involved in Italian politics since the end of World War II. The CIA helped swing the 1948 general election in favor of the centrist Christian Democrats and would continue to intervene in Italian politics until at least the early 1960s.

== History ==
=== 1948 ===
The 1948 general election was greatly influenced by the Cold War that was starting between the United States and the Soviet Union.

CIA memorandum to the Forty Committee (National Security Council), presented to the Select Committee on Intelligence, United States House of Representatives (the Pike Committee) during closed hearings held in 1975. The bulk of the committee's report that contained the memorandum was leaked to the press in February 1976 and first appeared in book form as CIA – The Pike Report. The CIA has also been accused of publishing forged letters in order to discredit the leaders of the Italian Communist Party (PCI). The National Security Act of 1947, which made foreign covert operations possible, had been signed into law about six months earlier by the American President Harry S. Truman.

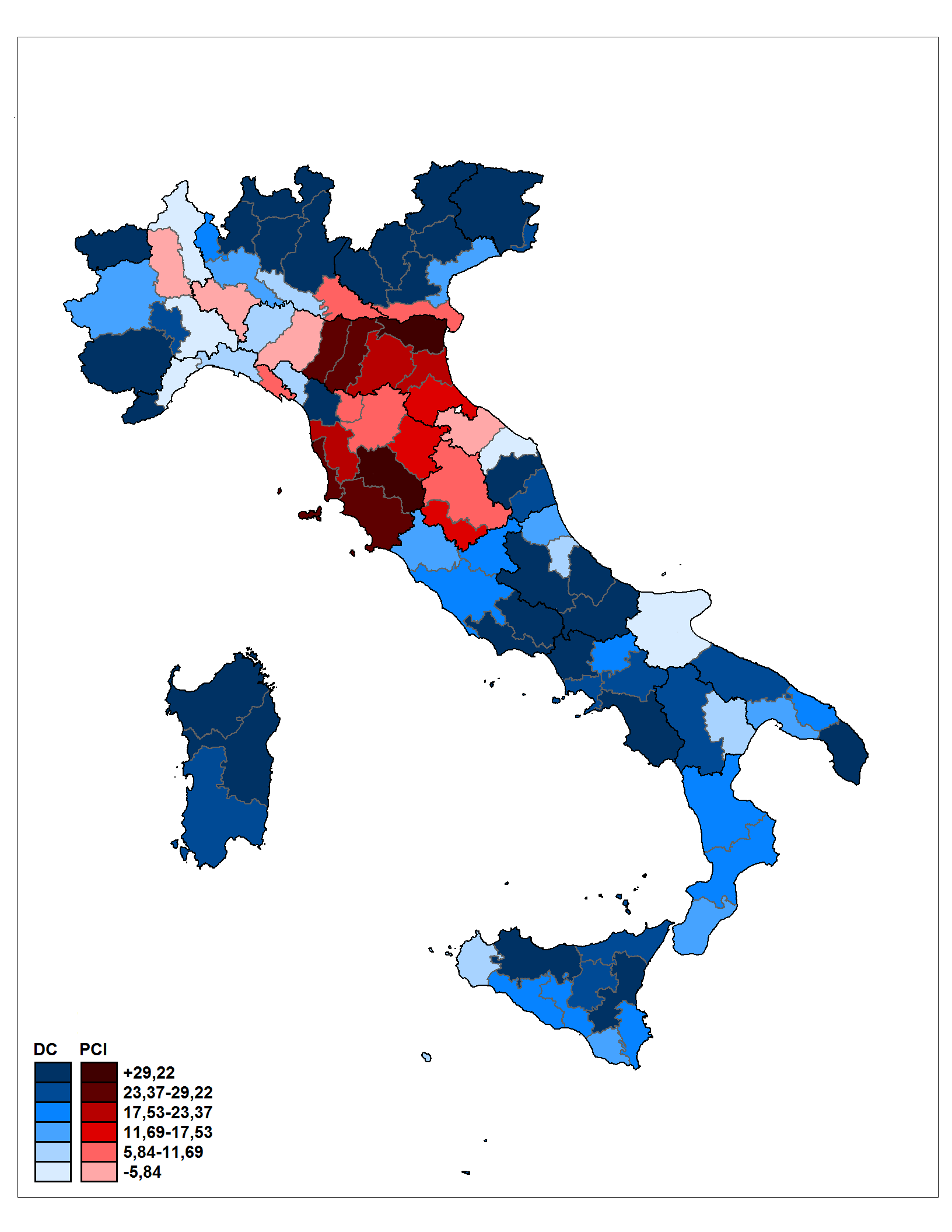
Differences

"We had bags of money that we delivered to selected politicians, to defray their political expenses, their campaign expenses, for posters, for pamphlets," according to CIA operative F. Mark Wyatt. In order to influence the election, the U.S. agencies undertook a campaign of writing ten thousand letters, made numerous short-wave radio broadcasts and funded the publishing of books and articles, all of which warned the Italians of what was believed to be the consequences of a communist victory. Time magazine backed the campaign, featuring the Christian Democracy leader and Prime Minister Alcide De Gasperi on its cover and in its lead story on 19 April 1948.

Overall, the US funneled $10 million to $20 million into the country for specifically anti-PCI purposes. Additionally, millions of dollars from the Economic Cooperation Administration affiliated with the Marshall Plan were spent on anti-communist "information activities."

The CIA claims that the PCI was being funded by the Soviet Union. According to Wyatt: "The Communist Party of Italy was funded ... by black bags of money directly out of the Soviet compound in Rome; and the Italian services were aware of this. As the elections approached, the amounts grew, and the estimates [are] that $8 million to $10 million a month actually went into the coffers of communism. Not necessarily completely to the party: Mr. Di Vittorio and labor was powerful, and certainly a lot went to him," according to the former CIA operative. Although the numbers are disputed, there is evidence of some financial aid, described as occasional and modest, from the Kremlin. PCI official Pietro Secchia and Stalin discussed financial support.

The Christian Democrats eventually won the 1948 election with 48% of the vote, and the Popular Democratic Front (FDP) received 31%. The CIA's practice of influencing the political situation was repeated in every Italian election for at least the next 24 years. A leftist coalition would not win a general election for the next 48 years until 1996. That was partly because of Italians' traditional bent for conservatism and even more importantly the Cold War, with the U.S. closely watching Italy in their determination to maintain a vital NATO presence in the Mediterranean and retain the Yalta-agreed status quo of western Europe.

=== Cold War ===
The CIA provided an average of $5 million annually in covert aid to Italy from the late 1940s to the early 1960s. This aid went towards financially supporting centrist Italian governments and using the awarding of contracts to weaken the Italian Communist Party's hold on labor unions.

=== 1990 ===
==== Covert paramilitary action ====
Italian government officials agree that a stay-behind network called Operation Gladio had been formed against the contingency of a Warsaw Pact invasion of Italy, but not terminated until 1990. It is disputed, however, if this network was involved in a series of "false flag" fascist terrorist actions in Italy that were blamed on the "Red Brigades" and other Left-wing political groups in an attempt to politically discredit the Italian Left wing.

Venetian magistrate Felice Casson, while investigating a 1970s car bombing in Peteano, uncovered references to Gladio while searching through files at SISMI, the Italian intelligence service. Time magazine quoted Prime Minister Giulio Andreotti admitting Gladio existed due to the climate of the times and chided the opposition for "insinuating suspicions." He insisted that although Gladio had a military structure, "it had never been involved in terrorist activities." According to Charles Richard, reporting for The Independent, General Paolo Inzerilli, SISMI chief of staff, said the network was shut down in the previous week of November 1990. A parliamentary committee on intelligence, looking into the Gladio affair heard testimony from three former prime ministers: Amintore Fanfani, Ciriaco De Mita and Bettino Craxi. Richards said General Gerardo Serravalle, head of Gladio from 1971 to 1974, told a television reporter that he now thought the explosion aboard the plane Argo 16 on 23 November 1973 was probably the work of Gladio members who were refusing to hand over the weapons they had obtained from Gladio. Until then it was widely believed the sabotage was carried out by Mossad, the Israeli foreign secret service, in retaliation for the pro-Libyan Italian government's decision to expel, rather than try, five Arabs who had tried to blow up an Israeli air-liner. The Arabs had been spirited out of the country on board the Argo 16.

The US state department has denied involvement in terrorism and stated that some of the claims have been influenced by an alleged Soviet forgery, US Army Field Manual 30-31B.

=== 2003 ===
==== Covert action and international law aspects ====
The Abu Omar Case (or Imam Rapito affair - "Kidnapped Imam affair") refers to the abduction and transfer to Egypt of the Imam of Milan Hassan Mustafa Osama Nasr, also known as Abu Omar. The legal issues of the case deal with extraordinary rendition carried out by the CIA in the context of the global war on terrorism.

On 23 December 2005, a judge issued a European arrest warrant against 22 CIA agents for allegedly abducting an Egyptian terrorist suspect. On 22 January 2006, the Italian Foreign Minister forwarded to the US authorities a request for legal assistance.
