= Arconte =

Arconte is a surname. Notable people with the surname include:

- Antonino Arconte (born 1954), Italian writer and former secret agent
- Taïryk Arconte (born 2003), Guadeloupean footballer
