= Hubacher =

Hubacher is a surname. Notable people with the surname include:

- Edy Hubacher (born 1940), Swiss sportsman
- Helmut Hubacher (1926–2020), Swiss politician
- Max Hubacher (born 1993), Swiss actor
