= Free war =

Form of guerrilla warfare

Free war (Swedish: fria kriget) is a form of guerrilla warfare that is conducted with cut-off smaller military units in enemy occupied territory. The largest difference between free war and guerrilla warfare is that free war is conducted by regular military forces, instead of paramilitary organizations or irregular military forces.

The term is most often associated with the Swedish military, primarily during the Cold War era. Though Sweden no longer has free war in their official doctrine, there are still military manuals that mention and deal with this subject.

During the Cold War, conducting free war was to some degree a part of the military training curriculum in Sweden, where the purpose was to enable every conscript soldier to conduct free war in the case of enemy occupation of Sweden.

== Tactics ==
In free war, battles should primarily be conducted through ambushes and raids on enemy logistics and commands in order to disrupt enemy operations, which ties down more enemy combatants behind the front line, thus making frontline operations easier.

In Swedish doctrine this is also where jägarförband units (Swedish commando-like infantry) will be conducting warfare, though through planned operations, as opposed to free war where the operations are unplanned.

== In modern Swedish military doctrine ==
Though there is no mention of free war in the modern Swedish strategic or operational doctrine documents, there are books that deal with this subject, namely Arméreglemente Taktik (Army Regulation Tactics) and certain Handbok Markstrid (Handbook Ground Combat) books.

This is what Arméreglemente Taktik has to say on the subject of the Free War:

Cut-off units, that are not in contact with higher levels of command and who can not conduct their ordinary task, go over to conducting the Free War. The previously initiated battle on the enemy's depth continues. All units that are left behind in an area dominated by the enemy, shall disrupt his operations. The battle is conducted in smaller units, most often in squads and platoons.

The society's resources is used, taking into account the livelihood of the civilian population. Resources are, if possible, taken from the enemy. The battle is conducted in such a manner that minimizes friendly casualties. When choosing targets, the risk of reprisals against the civilian population must be taken into account. The risk of being discovered and the need for areas to hide in may become instrumental in the conduct of battle. Larger cities, urban areas, and hilly terrain are especially suitable for the Free War. In open terrain, our ambitions must be limited. Long-term endurance and survival are prioritized.

The battle is conducted in such a manner that the opponent is surprised and is constantly made to feel threatened. The combat technique is varied. Unconventional methods are used. The intensity of the battle is varied through coordination to space, time and target choices.

Important targets are, for example

- the opponents leaders and staffs,
- indirect weapon systems,
- communications, and
- logistics.

The aim should be to regain contact with their original unit. Units who can not get it should seek to establish contact with other friendly units in order to be included in their operations or coordinate a continued Free War. During the Free War, it is especially important that entities at all levels ensure that international law is complied with.

Here is what Handbok Markstrid - Grupp and Handbok Markstrid - Pluton have to say on the subject of the Free War.

Units that are separated during combat and who can not be reunited with their original unit or continue the battle in accordance with higher commands battleplan shall to the utmost continue to fight actively. If possible, the combat at these units is coordinated by the head of the units that are divided for combat in depth by the opponent's formations. If such coordination can not be made, the units go over to conducting the Free War. This means that the commander of such a unit personally choose targets and goals of combat. International law with the Soldier Rules apply even under the Free War.

== See also ==
- Asymmetric warfare
- Deep battle
- Mission command
- Mosaic defence strategy
- Stay-behind
- Total Resistance (book)
- List of established military terms
