= For Independence =

Finnish political organization

For Independence (Itsenäisyyden Puolesta) was a right-wing political organization operating in Finland in the 1970s and 1980s, which opposed the influence of the Soviet Union in Finland, the policy of President Urho Kekkonen and socialism.

== History and activities ==
For Independence began its activities in Helsinki in the autumn of 1971 and was registered in April 1972. Local branches were also established in Lahti, Tampere, Turku and Vaasa. The first president of the association and the original central figure was the publisher Kauko Kare. In 1968 around him had formed a group called the Thursday Club, which also published the magazine Nootti. For Independence gathered together right-wing critics of President Kekkonen. It was co-founded by several individuals who later joined the Constitutional Right Party (POP). Well-known hard-right politicians such as Tuure Junnila and Georg C. Ehrnrooth spoke at the organization's events. However, For Independence was non-partisan. Members of the Board included politicians from multiple parties that opposed "Soviet hegemony".

In the autumn of 1974, a national umbrella organization, Popular Association For Independence, was established and journalist Heikki S. Eskelinen was elected chairman. A couple of years later, Eskelinen also replaced Kare as head of the Helsinki chapter. During Eskelinen's leadership, contacts were also established with the anti-communist Finnish Society Support (SYT) and the Business Commission (EVA). For Independence published in 1977 the pamphlet "Beware of the revolution" of which more than 30,000 copies were distributed through SYT.

For Independence supported parliamentarism but included several far-right activists, such as historian Mikko Uola. It was also linked to the Independent Finnish Youth (SIN), a youth organization that had been established in the early 1970s led by Jouni Lanamäki. SIN had been originally named Patriotic National Movement (IKL) after the fascist Patriotic People's Movement (IKL) and was connected to the neo-Nazi Nordic Realm Party (NRP).

In the 1980s, For Independence also supported Estonian separatism by disseminating information on the subject and organizing emigrant Estonians to speak at its events. In the 1980s, it became a member of the World Anti-Communist League, an international umbrella organization for anti-communism. For Independence ceased to be active after the end of the Cold War.

== North Star organization ==
The organisation's chairman, Heikki Eskelinen, and its secretary, First Lieutenant Pertti Olavi Riutta, became embroiled in a conspiracy involving espionage in the early 1980s. In 1978, Riutta founded a secret military organization called the North Star, which was intended to be a resistance movement should the Soviet Union occupy Finland. He recruited a two-digit number of members from For Independence, including officers and police. Riutta stole firearms, hand grenades and explosives from the Finnish Defense Forces for the use of the North Star. Riutta and Eskelinen provided the French intelligence service with information concerning the Soviet Union, in return for printing the Swiss Total Resistance manual that Riutta had translated into Finnish.

When the activities came to the attention of the Finnish Security Intelligence Service, Eskelinen and Riutta were arrested in April 1982. In addition to them, a dozen people were interrogated. These explained that they thought it was a sensitive but officially approved act, so the charges - titled “Deliberate gathering of information for a foreign state in a manner detrimental to Finland's relations with foreign states" - were limited to Eskelinen and Riutta. In March 1984, the Supreme Court sentenced Riutta and Eskelinen to imprisonment for espionage in favor of France, as well as for firearm and explosive offences.
