= Antonino Arconte =

Italian writer and former secret agent

Antonino Arconte (born February 1954) is an Italian writer and former secret agent.

== Life ==
Arconte was born in Oristano Sardinia, Italy, in February 1954. Raised from a family of military careers, at the age of sixteen years, he enlisted as sottufficiale (non-commissioned officer) in the Italian Army. In 1970, he attended the 14th course of the Scuola Allievi sottufficiali of Viterbo. In September of the same year, during the course, he was selected together with the other pupils to be part of the new Intelligence Service, SID Service Information Defense, the Italian secret service with military structure, which had begun in 1965 and commanded that year by general Vito Miceli, codename Ulisse. These had been instructed by Aldo Moro to organize the Italian secret paramilitary structure type "stay-behind" with the codename "Operation Gladio" and integrated with other similar organizations in other countries of NATO. Arconte was inserted in the Nucleus G of "Gladio of Centurians", the military part of the Gladio Organization and one of twelve branches in which had been divided for the SID and transit in the Navy.

== Revelations about Gladio and activities as a writer ==
In 1997, a website titled "The Real History of Gladio" was published and began a campaign of disclosure of the documents about the Gladio Organization which had remained in his possession in response to an attack on his life that declared to the press to have suffered in February 1993. On July 26, 1998, shall issue an interview in New York with journalist Stefano Vaccara in America Oggi, an Italian-language newspaper distributed in the U.S. The interview, published in two parts about nine pages, contains revelations on the structure of the Gladio Organization and shows in the light of operational experience of gladiator Arconte, known by the code name G-71, an overview of many obscure, Italian and international episodes during the cold war. The revelations note the involvement of the military prosecutor and civil of Rome that opens the judicial proceedings against Arconte, from which he will be acquitted and part offended by "unknown". At the same time, is interested in the case the national and international press and revelations become the object of parliamentary question. In December 2001, he published his autobiography "L'Ultima Missione - The Last Mission. G-71 and the truth denied", which summarizes the revelations and the judicial cases connected and illustrates the operations from secret agent to which the Arconte claims and documents to have participated.

== See also ==
- Gladio in Italy
