= Albert Bachmann =

Swiss military officer (1929–2011)

Albert "Bert" Bachmann (26 November 1929 in Zurich - 12 April 2011 in Ireland) was a Swiss military intelligence officer.

== Early life ==
Bachmann was born in Albisrieden and worked as a printer after leaving school at age 14. As a young man he flirted with communism, joining the youth wing of the PdA. Following the 1948 Communist seizure of power in Czechoslovakia, he changed course and became strongly patriotic. While doing his military service he applied for officer training, and went into military intelligence.

== Civil Defence booklet controversy ==
In 1968, he was the lead author of an official civil defence booklet that was distributed throughout the country which provided instructions on how to respond to invasion, through the character of "Wilhelm Eiferli". Its warning of the danger from collaborationist elements in the Swiss Left made it the subject of national debate. 'Défense civile' has since been translated for distribution in Japan and Egypt; an attempt by Franco's Spain to buy the right to publish the book was rebuffed by the Swiss military. Bachmann was not involved in the subsequent political controversy- he was on an undercover mission in the Republic of Biafra, a small nation struggling for independence from Nigeria.

== Return to Switzerland ==
In 1976, he was promoted to the rank of Colonel, heading up the intelligence and defense subsection of the Federal Military Department. He had control of three clandestine units, Bureau Ha, a foreign intelligence unit, an Extraordinary Intelligence agency, which monitored internal threats, and Special Service D (Spec D), an organization formed to provide the basis of resistance to an occupation. Expanding Spec D, Bachmann formed Projekt-26, a more widely capable unit. He bought the Liss Ard country estate, near Skibbereen in County Cork in Ireland, as a retreat for a Swiss government-in-exile in the event of an invasion.

== Schilling incident ==
In November 1979 Austrian police arrested Kurt Schilling, one of Bachmann's operatives, who was charged with spying on Austrian troops on exercise near Sankt Pölten. As the Austrian government had invited observers from Eastern Europe, it was not clear why he was there. He insisted that he was Swiss and during his trial, he revealed that his mission was to judge how long Austrian forces could last in the case of a Soviet invasion. Due to Schilling's ineptness the judge showed leniency, sentencing him to a five-month suspended sentence and deportation. Die Presse nicknamed him "the spy who came in from the Emmentaler".

In 1979 Bachmann was forced to take early retirement, and an inquiry by politicians exposed many of his contingency plans to the public. The Swiss government sold Liss Ard in the early 1980s, but Bachmann continued to live in the West Cork region following his departure from Switzerland. He reputedly owned a number of properties near Tragumna outside Skibbereen, and ran a riding school in the area for a number of years.
