= Jouni Lanamäki =

Finnish restaurateur (born 1950)

Jouni Lanamäki (born 1950) is a Finnish restaurant entrepreneur who owns popular karaoke bars Oulu and In Helsinki. He has been involved in the municipal politics of Oulu in the 1990s, when he received publicity for his anti-foreigner rhetoric.

== Political activity ==
Lanamäki is from Sotkamo. His father was school counsellor Toivo Lanamäki. In his youth, Lanamäki led the right-wing radical youth organization Patriotic Youth of Finland (SIN), originally called the Patriotic National Movement, which declared its activities to be based on the 1930s Patriotic People's Movement program. The seat of the organization was Kajaani, but with its publicity-seeking campaigns it received national attention and its local departments were established in other cities as well. SIN sought cooperation Kauko Kare's For Independence (IP) - with SIN being planned to become the youth wing of IP. SIN and Lanamäki also maintained friendly relations with the neo-Nazi Nordic Realm Party. Nordic Realm Party's Finland representative Nils Mandel took part in SIN's events such as book burnings, where SIN members burned Tiedonantaja among others publications. Eventually SIN merged with the Nordic Realm Party.

== As a restaurateur and municipal politician ==
Later, Lanamäki became a hotel and restaurant entrepreneur. He founded a hotel called Gasthaus Lanamäki in the premises of the former Oulas Hotel in Oulu in 1984. He received public attention by establishing topless bars in Oulu. Lanamäki has also been said to have brought karaoke bars to Finland.

In the early 1990s, Lanamäki gained public attention for his racial and anti-foreigner statements. Lanamäki and two bouncers were sentenced in 1992 in Oulu district court to fines for ethnic discrimination because they had denied a black man access to the restaurant in Oulu. After the publicity the case brought, Lanamäki stood as a candidate for 1992 municipal elections as an independent and was elected to Oulu city council in a landslide. In press interviews, he said, among other things, that he wanted to keep Oulu "as the white city of the Nordic countries" and that the survival of Finns required "combatting the colored peoples".

Since then, Lanamäki has expanded his business to Helsinki, where he owns several karaoke bars, such as Pataässä, Anna K, Erottaja bar and Marian Helmi. According to tax statistics, Lanamaki was in 2013 Kainuu's second highest taxpayer. In 2017, he had the largest earned income in the province.
