= Kjell Inge Bjerga =

Norwegian historian and professor

- Born: 1970 (age 55–56)

Academic background
- Education: University of Oslo, University of Bergen

Academic work
- Discipline: History
- Institutions: Norwegian Institute for Defence Studies
- Main interests: Defence policy, military organization, strategic governance

Kjell Inge Bjerga (born 1970) is a Norwegian historian and professor of defence history. He is a prominent scholar in the field of Norwegian military and security policy, and was the director of the Norwegian Institute for Defence Studies (IFS) until 2025.

Bjerga is originally from Aukra, near Molde. He holds a cand.philol. degree in history from the University of Oslo and earned his doctorate from the University of Bergen with a dissertation titled Forsvarspolitikk og forvaltningspolitikk? Organisering, reformer og militæreksepsjonalisme i Forsvarets sentrale ledelse mellom 1940 og 2003 ("Defence Policy and Administrative Policy? Organization, Reforms and Military Exceptionalism in the Central Defence Leadership between 1940 and 2003").

His doctoral research was conducted at the Department of Archaeology, History, Cultural and Religious Studies under the supervision of Professor Tore Grønlie. Bjerga joined the Institute for Defence Studies as a researcher in 1999, became section head in 2005, and led research on organizational reform between 2012 and 2016. He served as dean of the Norwegian Defence University College from 2014 to 2017 and headed the secretariat for the Norwegian government's working group on military support to the police in 2016.
