= Operation Washtub (United States) =

Operation to foster potential agents in Alaska

- Stay-Behind Agent Program in Alaska; Part of Cold War
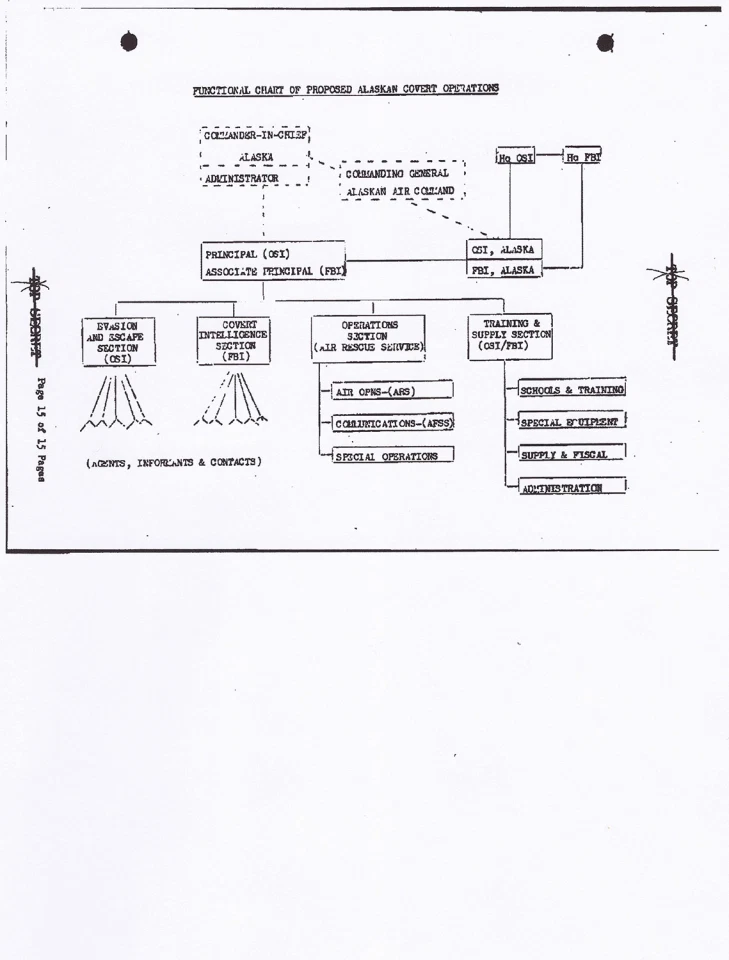
- Chain of command for Operation Washtub, produced by the Air Force Office of Special Investigation
- Operational scope: Covert intelligence and non-combat evasion planning
- Location: Territory of Alaska, United States
- Planned: 1950
- Planned by: Federal Bureau of Investigation, United States Air Force Office of Special Investigations
- Commanded by: J. Edgar Hoover, Joseph Carroll
- Objective: Establish stay-behind agents and escape infrastructure in case of Soviet invasion
- Date: 1 July 1951 – 3 January 1959
- Executed by: United States Air Force Office of Special Investigations
- Outcome: Operation terminated; caches converted for survival use
- Casualties: None

Operation Washtub, also known as STAGE (Stay Behind Agent Program), was a top secret joint operation between the United States Air Force's Office of Special Investigations and the Federal Bureau of Investigation. Officially, its purpose was to build an intelligence network in the event that the Soviet Union invaded and occupied Alaska. Primarily formulated by J. Edgar Hoover and his then protegé Joseph Carroll, the Operation was enacted from 1951 to 1959, when Alaska was granted statehood. The primary objectives of Operation Washtub were fostering potential stay-behind agents in the then Territory of Alaska for covert intelligence gathering, and maintaining evasion and escape facilities for captured friendly American Forces.

The FBI "abruptly" ended its involvement in September 1951, for reasons which do not appear in declassified FBI materials. Correspondence dated to that time period would indicate that Director Hoover directly ordered the FBI to "get out at once", fearing humiliation for the agency should an invasion occur. This meant that almost the entirety of the operation's realization was carried out by the Air Force Office of Special Investigations.

== Selection and training of agents ==
The agents chosen for this operation needed to live locally, be able to move around, not be obvious targets for Russian invaders, and not be military personnel. The proposal specifically states that fishermen and bush pilots would make good candidates. The selection of agents from Eskimo and Aleut peoples was avoided due to intelligence figures' suspicions of their loyalties, with official documents stating "their prime concern is with survival and their allegiance would easily shift to any power in control.” Locations for the agents were chosen for their strategic significance, with particular interest in centers of transport and communication. Cities with known agents included Anchorage, Fairbanks, Palmer, Big Delta, and Cordova.

The agents were trained separately from one another, being left unaware of the other's identities, so that in event of capture or corruption no other agents would be compromised. In addition to this the agents' training included simple methods of coding, observation and communication, scouting and patrolling, airdrop and pick-up techniques, close combat, and Russian uniforms and equipment. In order to fulfill the primary objective of this operation - the covert collection of intelligence information in the Alaskan Territory - the agents were also interested in military information, and any intelligence that they deemed to be important. For coordination between the leaders of the operation and its agents there were Administrator Liaisons for the agents to contact. For this operation the agents were equipped with 30-06 rifles with a times 4 scope, a small calibre pistol with a maxim silencer, camera, climbing rope and various other things to keep the agents alive, all supplied by the government for the agents. The second part of the operation being an escape and evasion plan for downed American planes, this includes the supply caches that were available for all sections of the US military. During the operation the agents were paid an inactive fund of $3,000 (approximately $35,000 in 2024) per year, which was said to be doubled once the invasion was to begin.

At the end of the operation there were a total of 89 agents presumably being placed in the various regions provided in the official document. Agents named in declassified documents included Dyton Abb Gillard, Guy Raymond, Ira Weisner, and most notably Bob Reeve an Alaskan bush pilot who was the founder of the now defunct Reeve Airways. Ultimately the Operation ended due to the costs of maintaining the agents' funds and the cost of supplying the caches in the unbearable weather. Deborah Kidwell, an official military historian of the OSI, comments that the caches were turned into survival caches.
