= Parliamentary inquiry committee =

Investigation committee of a government legislative branch

A parliamentary inquiry committee, or parliamentary committee of inquiry (PCI), is an investigation committee of the legislative branch of a country's parliament, which hears testimonies and gathers information directly on matters of public concern, in what is often termed a public inquiry. Usually the committee delivers a report with conclusions and recommendations, in order to spur government action to improve policy or prevent similar events from happening again. The term "parliamentary inquiry" is not used consistently in all countries, and may be investigated by a committee set up for a limited duration (European model) or by a standing committee (particularly those following the Westminster system of government), which is set up as an ongoing committee to assist the parliament in a variety of ways.

== Americas ==
=== South America ===
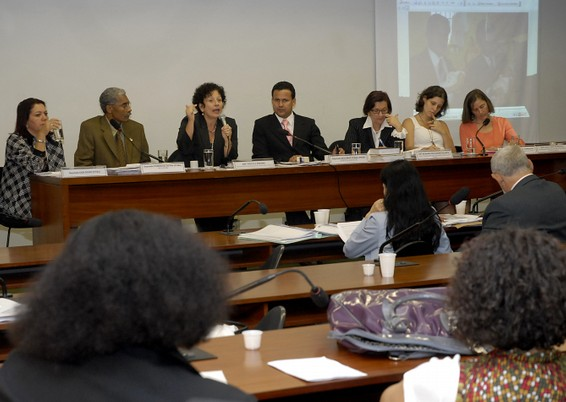
Meeting of the Committee of Inquiry on the Prison System (Brazil)

The Parliamentary Inquiry Committee model has been adopted by several countries such as Paraguay, Peru, and Venezuela. In the case of Argentina, although it uses the institute, it is not provided for in its constitution. In Uruguay, it has been referred to in its constitutional text since 1918, expressly allowing for the establishment of a Parliamentary Inquiry Committee.

== Europe ==
In the European model of parliamentary committees of inquiry (PCIs), they are set up by parliaments to investigate a particular matter of public interest, and often have their legal basis enshrined in the constitution. PCIs are able to be initiated by parliament in several European countries, and in doing so may conduct original research and interviews, as well as create recommendations. They are able to request information and evidence from government as well as public and private bodies.

In some European bicameral parliaments, for example Italy and Spain, PCIs may be drawn from both chambers. In others, including Austria, Germany, Poland, and Slovenia, PCIs can only be established by the lower house.

=== Parliament of the European Union ===
The European Parliament may set up committees of inquiry.

=== Belgium ===
The Chamber of Representatives, the lower house of the Belgian Federal Parliament, has the right to conduct parliamentary inquiries pursuant to article 56 of the Belgian Constitution. The Senate also had a right to enquiry until 2014. Committees of inquiry were rarely set up until 20 years ago, and have been used increasingly in the recent past, dealing with matters deemed of major public concern or apparent governmental failure.

The regional parliaments of Belgium also have the right to conduct parliamentary inquiries.

=== Netherlands ===
Two recent parliamentary inquiry commissions in the Dutch House of Representatives were:

- the parliamentary inquiry into natural gas extraction Groningen
- the parliamentary inquiry into the COVID-19 pandemic

=== Portugal ===
In Portugal, article 181, paragraph 5 expressly provides that Parliamentary Inquiry Committees have investigative powers similar to judicial authorities. For example, the Camarate case resulted in inquiry committees.

== Oceania ==
=== Australia ===
In Australia, both state and federal governments conduct inquiries to look at specific issues with the aim of making recommendations to reform existing laws or policies. They differ from royal commissions, which are the highest form of inquiry, conducted by completely independent commissioners. The latter cannot make laws, but can recommend changes. Parliamentary committees are composed of elected members of parliament, who represent their constituents and have the power to pass laws.

Federal government parliamentary inquiries are handled by permanent select or standing committees, in either the Senate House of Representatives, or jointly. An example of the latter is the 2026 Inquiry into racism, hate and violence directed at Aboriginal and Torres Strait Islander people, being carried out by the Joint Standing Committee on Aboriginal and Torres Strait Islander Affairs, following a referral by Malarndirri McCarthy, Minister for Indigenous Australians. State government committees may also be drawn from either or both houses of parliament in each state.

== United Kingdom ==
In the UK, the Westminster system of government system is used. Various parliamentary committees are set up as (semi-)permanent committees as House of Lords committees, House of Commons committees, or joint committees. Commons and Lords committee inquiries are mainly tasked with investigating issues relating to government performance, and have a different focus and less power than an independent public inquiry, such as the Grenfell Tower Inquiry, which was called by the prime minister and led by a judge. Inquiries allow committees to consider oral and written evidence on a particular topic, and usually result in the publication of a report.

== See also ==
- Parliamentary committees of the United Kingdom
- Parliamentary inquiry in Belgium
- Parliamentary Inquiry Committee in Switzerland
- United States congressional hearing#Investigative
