= U.S. Army Field Manual 30-31B =

Document claiming to be a classified appendix to a U.S. Army Field Manual

The supposed document

The US Army Field Manual 30-31B, dubbed the "Westmoreland Field Manual", purportedly outlined a strategy called the "strategy of tension", wherein violent attacks are orchestrated and blamed on left-wing groups to justify government action. The US State Department, CIA officials, and some scholars believe it to be a Cold War-era hoax conducted by Soviet intelligence services.

The document first surfaced in the 1970s in Turkey and later circulated in various countries. During a 1980 hearing, CIA officials denied its authenticity, declaring it a forgery. Arguments to its authenticity were strengthened by evidence uncovered about Operation Gladio in the 1990s.

== History ==
U.S. Army Field Manual 30-31 was first published in 1967, with updates published in 1970 and 1972. It contained a classified supplement FM 30-31A Stability Operations - Intelligence Collection. FM 30-31B was dated 1970, marked top secret, and included the signature of General William Westmoreland, earning it the name the "Westmoreland Field Manual". The U.S. government has acknowledged FM 30-31 and Supplement A but maintains that Supplement B is a hoax.

In 1973, the Turkish newspaper Barış (sometimes anglicized to Barish) announced one of their journalists had come into possession of FM 30-31B, but the journalist disappeared shortly thereafter. A journalist with the paper, Tal Tahan, published a translated copy in 1975. In 1976, an anonymous source claiming to be a member of the US military left a copy with a cover letter addressed to the president Ferdinand Marcos in the Philippines Embassy in Bangkok.

Over the next two years, various European magazines ran stories on it, including the Spanish Triunfo and El País, Italian L'Europeo and French Le Monde. The U.S. Embassy in Rome wrote a letter to the publisher of L'Europeo, Giovanni Valentini, saying it would be "inopportune" to publish the document. He published the manual and the diplomat's letter. The diplomat responded that it was a fake. In 1979, the Covert Action Information Bulletin concluded: "It is hard to imagine that the document is not genuine. The format, style and classification stampings appear consistent with other military supplements, and the document is filled with authentic military phraseology ... If it is a forgery, why did a high Embassy official describe its publication as 'inopportune'?"

In 1979, the House of Representatives Permanent Select Committee on Intelligence, Subcommittee of Oversight started an inquiry into forgeries designed to give U.S. intelligence agencies a bad name. At a 1980 hearing of subcommittee, CIA officials acknowledged the manual and supplement A but argued supplement B was a forgery by the KGB. In 1987, an Italian parliamentary investigation into the far-right and anti-Communist Masonic lodge Propaganda Due (P2) published a report that included FM 30-31. In a documentary 5 years later, Licio Gelli, the leader of P2, stated the CIA gave him the manual. A 1991 Belgian parliamentary report into the Belgian stay-behind network said that "the commission has not any certainty about the authenticity of the document."

In 1994, Allan Francovich's BBC documentary about Operation Gladio, NATO and CIA stay-behind operations in Italy, was aired. He interviewed head of P2 Licio Gelli, who said the CIA gave him the manual. In another interview, he asked CIA Deputy director (1962-1966) Ray S. Cline whether FM 30-31B was a forgery, who said "I suspect it is an authentic document. I don't doubt it." Italian general Gerardo Serravalle, who headed Gladio, said CIA funding was contingent less on training than on the ability to counter street disturbances, general strikes, and the rise of the Communist Party. In the same documentary, former CIA Director (1973-1976) William Colby said that he had "never heard of" the document and Michael Ledeen claimed it to be a Soviet forgery.

The Swiss author Daniele Ganser made use of the Field Manual for his 2004 book on Operation Gladio. The State Department issued a statement rejecting the claim that stay-behind networks were linked to terrorism in Europe and maintained that it was a Soviet forgery. In a 2010 book review, Peer Henrik Hansen criticized it for not describing FM 30-31B as a hoax. In a 2020 book, Thomas Rid argued the document was a forgery by the Soviet intelligence services.

== See also ==
- CIA activities in Nicaragua
- Nicaragua v. United States
- Operation Condor
- Operation Northwoods
- Psychological warfare
- U.S. Army and CIA interrogation manuals
- United States involvement in regime change
