= Journal of Diplomacy and International Relations =

- Discipline: Politics, international relations
- Language: English
- Edited by: Peter Roberto

Publication details
- Former names: Whitehead Journal of Diplomacy and International Relations, Seton Hall Journal of Diplomacy and International Relations
- History: 2000-present
- Publisher: Seton Hall University Press (United States)
- Frequency: Annual

Standard abbreviations
- ISO 4: J. Dipl. Int. Relat.

Indexing
- ISSN: 1538-6589
- LCCN: 2005234724
- OCLC no.: 70341272

Links
- Online access; Online archive

The Journal of Diplomacy and International Relations is an annual academic journal published by the School of Diplomacy and International Relations at Seton Hall University covering international affairs. It was established in 2000 as the Seton Hall Journal of Diplomacy and International Relations and is managed and edited by graduate students at the School of Diplomacy and International Relations. The current editor-in-chief is Peter Roberto.

== Abstracting and indexing ==
The journal is abstracted and indexed in:

- Columbia International Affairs Online
- Public Affairs Information Service
- International Political Science Abstracts
- America: History and Life
- Historical Abstracts
- International Relations and Security Network
