= Total Resistance (book) =

Guerrilla warfare manual by Hans von Dach, 1957

- Cover of the 3rd German language edition (1966)
- Author: Hans von Dach
- Original title: Der totale Widerstand: Eine Kleinkriegsanleitung für Jedermann
- Language: German
- Subject: Military
- Genre: Instruction manual
- Publication place: Switzerland
- ISBN: 3-9521096-1-4; ISBN 978-0-87364-021-3; ISBN 978-1607963042 (English edition)
- OCLC: 75856605

Total Resistance, originally published in German as Der totale Widerstand: Eine Kleinkriegsanleitung für Jedermann ("Total Resistance: A Guerrilla Warfare Manual for Everyone"), is a seven-volume guerilla warfare manual.

Swiss army officer Hans von Dach wrote it in 1957 to prepare the Swiss population for an occupation of Switzerland by Warsaw Pact forces, an eventuality then considered possible in the context of the Cold War. The book has been republished as pirated translations in dozens of languages in numerous countries abroad, and notably found use by left-wing terror groups in the 1960s and 70s.

== Publication ==
Der totale Widerstand was first published in 1957 in seven volumes by the Swiss Non-Commissioned Officers' Association (Schweizer Unteroffiziersverband, SUOV), intended for broad dissemination to the Swiss population. The book was a commercial success, being reprinted five times and selling in the tens of thousands, notably in West Germany and Austria. It became by far the most well-known of von Dach's more than a hundred works on military tactics.

== Contents ==
The book is a manual for civilians to conduct irregular warfare against an occupying force with no arms heavier than rifles, hand grenades, and mines.

The topics covered in the first volume include:

- the operative, tactical, technical and psychological basics of guerrilla warfare, such as sabotage, assassination and conduct under torture,
- the establishment, organization and command of guerrilla warfare units and civilian resistance movements,
- enemy methods of suppressing and combating guerrilla warfare.

The other volumes describe the manufacture and use of basic weapons: chemical weapons (vol. 2), the Partisan 9mm submachine gun (vol. 3), the TARN pistol (vol. 4), improvised explosive devices (vol. 5), the TELL noise suppressor (vol. 6) and hand grenades (vol. 7). It concludes with the words: "Better die standing than live kneeling!".

Because the book is based on the conduct of World War II occupying forces (Nazi Germany and the Soviet Union), most of its contents are politically and technically no longer applicable to the early 21st century. Some of von Dach's instructions remain relevant, however, to current conflicts, such as how to sabotage infrastructure, construct roadblocks, make and use incendiary devices or hide weapons and ammunition.

== Reception ==
=== In Switzerland ===
The book was not well received by senior Army leaders, despite being popular in the militia officer corps, who favored a defence policy based on conventional combined-arms and mechanized warfare rather than irregular warfare. In 1974, the Chief of the General Staff vetoed publishing Total Resistance as an army manual, partly concerned it advocated conduct that violated the laws of war. When the Swiss Army did establish a secret stay-behind organization, P-26, in the 1970s, it was conceived as a top-down, cadre-led structure rather than the broad, decentralized civilian resistance movement envisioned by von Dach.

Nonetheless, the book remains part of the curriculum of the Swiss Army Military Academy at the ETH Zurich as one of the "classics of the history of strategy and the theory of war."

=== Abroad ===
The book soon found unexpected success abroad. In 1965, U.S. special forces published an unauthorized translation entitled Total Resistance – Swiss Army Guide to Guerilla Warfare and Underground Operations. Other pirated translations continued to be published in dozens of languages in countries ranging from Angola to Vietnam. In the Soviet Union, the book was derided as "nonsense" in a 1984 newspaper article.

Total Resistance became notably popular as an instruction manual for several left-wing terror groups active in the 1960s and 70s. According to Swiss and European police reports of the time, it was widely disseminated in left-wing militant circles, and its tactics were used in bomb attacks in Southern Tyrol, New York and Frankfurt, as well as in unrests in Paris. For instance, in Italy, the publisher Savelli included part of the book in a left-wing political guerrilla handbook, In caso di golpe. Manuale teorico-pratico per il cittadino di resistenza totale e di guerra di popolo di guerriglia e di controguerriglia, in 1975.

In 1981, Pertti Riutta of the right-wing Itsenäisyyden Puolesta organization translated the book into Finnish as Vastarintaopas, intending to hand it out to trusted people to prepare for a possible Soviet invasion. The French intelligence agency DGSE also secretly printed the book. Only ten were handed out before Finnish officials confiscated the books, and Riutta and one of his associates were charged with espionage against the Soviet Union for France.

In Germany, the book was often found in police searches, including those of Red Army Faction members. Since 1988, Der totale Widerstand has been the only Swiss book whose distribution is restricted in Germany because it is indexed by the Federal Department for Media Harmful to Young Persons as "conducive to confusing the social ethics of children and young people, and to promote their inclination to violence".
