= Lawrence F. Kaplan =

American journalist

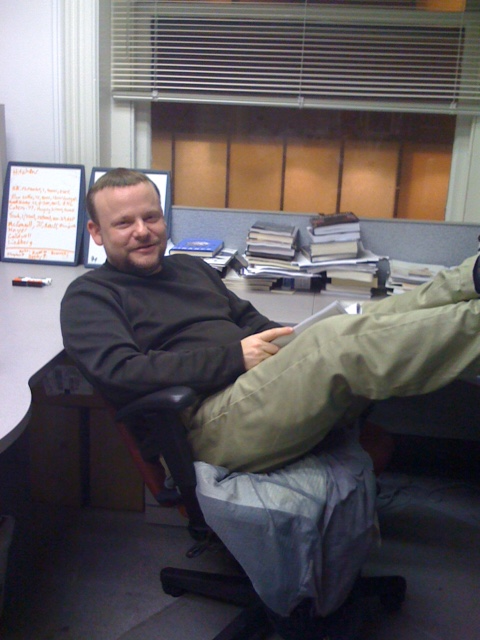
Lawrence F. Kaplan

Lawrence F. Kaplan (born 1969) was editor of World Affairs and executive editor of The National Interest, both foreign policy magazines. He is also distinguished visiting professor at the U.S. Army War College. He was formerly a senior editor at The New Republic, where he wrote about U.S. foreign policy and international affairs. From 2005 to 2007, Kaplan reported for the magazine from Iraq. He has also written about foreign policy for The Wall Street Journal, The Financial Times, Slate, The New York Times, The Washington Post, and numerous other publications.

Kaplan was born to a Jewish family and is a graduate of Columbia University, Oxford, and the Johns Hopkins School of Advanced International Studies.
