= Hans von Dach =

Swiss military theorist (1927-2003)

Hans von Dach (1927–2003) was a Swiss military theorist. He was the author of the influential seven-volume 1957 guerrilla warfare manual Total Resistance (Der totale Widerstand: Kleinkriegsanleitung für Jedermann), which made him the internationally best-known Swiss tactical theorist.

Von Dach, a Bernese, was employed from 1970 to 1980 in the training division of the Swiss Defence Department. His emphasis on broadly based irregular warfare was not shared by senior Army leaders, who preferred to focus Switzerland's Cold War defence efforts on conventional combined-arms tactics and equipment. Consequently, his views had no influence on army strategy.

Despite the wide readership reached by Total Resistance, von Dach was not promoted beyond the relatively junior rank of Major which he attained in 1963, 25 years before his retirement in 1988. This may have been to make it easier for the army to disclaim responsibility for his writings, which were criticized as advocating conduct that would violate the laws of war. In 1974, the Chief of the General Staff vetoed the publication of Total Resistance, then very popular among officers, as an army manual, partly because of these concerns. Von Dach dismissed them; believing that the Soviet Union, which he considered the most likely occupying force during the Cold War, would have no regard for the legalities of war in any case. He did enjoy tacit support for his authorial work by his military superiors, because the implicit threat of a sustained defensive guerrilla warfare effort represented by his writings was considered to contribute to the overall Swiss defence strategy of deterrence (dissuasion).

In addition to Total Resistance, von Dach authored more than a hundred publications about tactics, including army manuals, defence journal articles and books, such as Gefechtstechnik ("Combat technique", various editions from 1958 to 1957), Kampfbeispiele ("Combat examples", 1977) and Kampfverfahren der Verteidigung ("Defensive combat techniques", 1959). A gifted draftsman, he illustrated many of his own works.

In his private life, von Dach was engaged in social work for the homeless as a member of the Salvation Army.
