= Norwegian Institute for Defence Studies =

Norwegian defence research institute

The Norwegian Institute for Defence Studies (Norwegian: Institutt for forsvarsstudier, IFS) is a state defence research institute based in Oslo, Norway. It was established in 1980 and is part of the Norwegian Defence University College, a state university college that is both part of the Norwegian Armed Forces and the academic sector. .

It is a politically independent institute within the Norwegian Armed Forces. Its main activities are concentrated in the areas of research, teaching and dissemination.

It is divided into four Centres: Centre for Norwegian and European Security, Centre for Civil-Military Relations, Centre for Asian Studies and Centre for Transatlantic Studies. The current director of the IFS is Kjell Inge Bjerga, who will leave the position in 2025.

== Employees ==
- Olav Riste

== See also ==
- Norwegian Defence Research Establishment
