= Projekt-27 =

Swiss secret military intelligence (1981–1990)

Projekt 27, usually referred to as P-27, was a secret intelligence-gathering unit of the Swiss Armed Forces between 1981 and 1990. It was part of the Swiss military intelligence service UNA, tasked with the "gathering of intelligence under unusual and dangerous conditions". It was formed as a planned wartime intelligence structure and distinguished from Projekt 26 or P-26, which was the counterpart of NATO's own stay-behind network. It was dissolved in 1990 after its existence was made public in the wake of the secret files scandal, exposed during a parliamentary investigation headed by Senator Carlo Schmid. The commission discovered that the intelligence-gathering activities of these clandestine organizations, along with the cantonal and federal police forces, compiled dossiers of around 900,000 individuals and organizations who were placed under surveillance due to suspected "un-Swiss" behavior.
