= Helmut Hubacher =

Swiss politician (1926–2020)

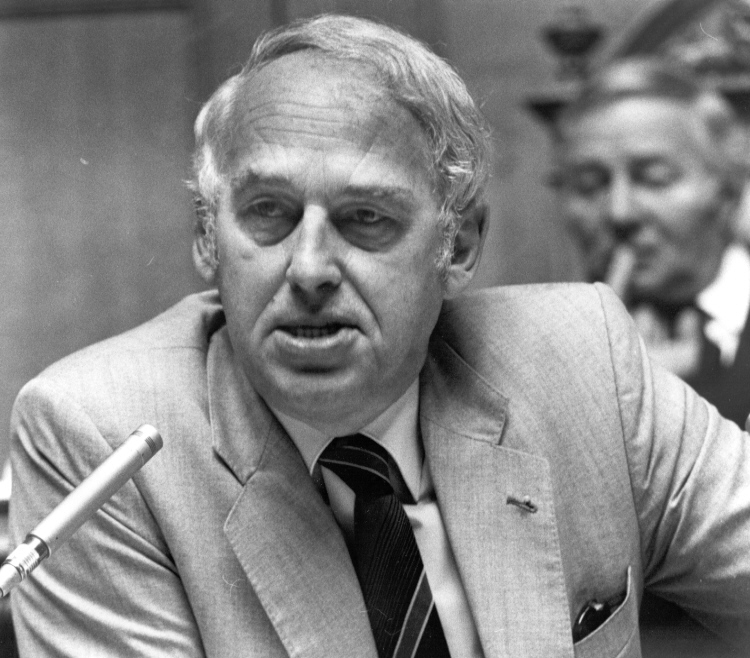
- Helmut Hubacher

Member of the Grand Council of the Canton of Basel-Stadt
- In office 1956–1968

Member of the Swiss National Council
- In office 16 September 1963 – 19 December 1997

President of the Social Democratic Party of Switzerland
- In office 1975–1990

Personal details
- Born: 15 April 1926 Krauchthal, Switzerland
- Died: 19 August 2020 (aged 94) Porrentruy
- Party: PS

Helmut Hubacher (15 April 1926 – 19 August 2020) was a Swiss politician, a member of the Social Democratic Party of Switzerland.

== Biography ==
After spending his early career with Swiss Federal Railways, he became a secretary with the Syndicate of Public Services. In 1963, he became Editor-in-Chief of Basler Abend Zeitung. From 1956 to 1968, he served as a Grand Councillor in the Canton of Basel-Stadt, from 1963 to 1997, he served on the National Council, and he served as President of the Social Democratic Party from 1990 to 1997.
