= Olav Riste =

Norwegian historian (1933–2015)

- Born: 11 April 1933; Volda Municipality
- Died: 21 July 2015 (aged 82)
- Occupation: Historian
- Awards: Order of St. Olav (2003)

Olav Riste (11 April 1933 – 21 July 2015) was a Norwegian historian.

He was born in Volda Municipality. He took his D.Phil. degree at the University of Oxford with a thesis on Norway's stance in the First World War entitled Norway's relations with belligerent powers in the First World War. A book based on the thesis called The Neutral Ally: Norway's relations with belligerent powers in the First World War was published in 1965. He served as director of the Norwegian Institute for Defence Studies from 1980 to 1996, then research director until his retirement. He was also an adjunct professor at the University of Bergen from 1980 and the University of Oslo from 1997. His research focus has been on international and national security, and military history. Riste edited the Scandinavian Journal of History from 1976 to 1981.

He was a member of the Norwegian Academy of Science and Letters. He was decorated Knight, First Class of the Royal Norwegian Order of St. Olav in 2003. He died in July 2015.

== Selected bibliography ==
Books

- Norway 1940-45: The Resistance Movement, with Berit Nökleby. Oslo: Aschehoug (1970). ISBN 978-8251801645. OCLC 1194923881.
- London-regjeringa. Norge i krigsalliansen 1940–1945 [2 vols] (1973/1979).
- Norway and the Second World War, with Johannes Andenæs and Magne Skodvin. Oslo: Tanum-Norli (1983). ISBN 978-8251817776. OCLC 1200564701.
- The Norwegian Intelligence Service 1945–1970. Norway ed. (1997); US ed. (1999).

Book contributions

- "The Historical Determinants of Norwegian Foreign Policy." In: Norwegian Foreign Policy in the 1980s. Oslo: Norwegian University Press (1985). ISBN 8200072967.

Articles

- "Stay Behind: A Clandestine Cold War Phenomenon." Journal of Cold War Studies, vol. 16, no. 4 (2014), pp. 35–59. doi:10.1162/JCWS_a_00515.

Published by Harvard College and the Massachusetts Institute of Technology.

Book reviews

- Review of Second to None: U.S. Intelligence Activities in Northern Europe 1943-1946, by Peer Henrik Hansen. Journal of Cold War Studies, vol. 17, no. 3 (2015), pp. 258–260.

Published by Harvard College and the Massachusetts Institute of Technology.
