= Stay-behind =

Clandestine preparations started by governments for anticipated invasions

A stay-behind operation is one where a country places secret operatives or organizations in its own territory, for use in case of a later enemy occupation. The stay-behind operatives would then form the basis of a resistance movement, and act as spies from behind enemy lines. Small-scale operations may cover discrete areas, but larger stay-behind operations envisage reacting to the conquest of whole countries.

Stay-behind also refers to a military tactic whereby specially trained soldiers let themselves be overrun by enemy forces in order to conduct intelligence, surveillance, target acquisition, and reconnaissance tasks often from pre-prepared hides.

== History ==
Stay-behind operations of significant size existed during World War II. The United Kingdom put in place the Auxiliary Units. Partisans in Axis-occupied Soviet territory in the early 1940s operated with a stay-behind element.

During the Cold War, the North Atlantic Treaty Organization (NATO) coordinated and the Central Intelligence Agency (CIA) and the British Secret Intelligence Service (SIS) helped to set up clandestine stay-behind networks in many European countries, intending to activate them in the event of Warsaw Pact forces taking over an area. According to Martin Packard they were "financed, armed, and trained in covert resistance activities, including assassination, political provocation and disinformation".

These clandestine stay-behind organisations (SBOs) were created and run under the auspices of intelligence services and recruited their agents from amongst the civilian population. Specially selected civilian stay-behind networks or SBOs were created in many Western countries, including Italy, the Netherlands, Belgium, Luxembourg, France, Germany, Switzerland, Norway, Austria and others, including Iran. They prepared to organize resistance, sabotage and intelligence-gathering in occupied (NATO) territory. The most famous of these clandestine stay-behind networks was the Italian Operation Gladio, acknowledged by Italian prime minister Giulio Andreotti on October 24, 1990.

Many hidden weapons-caches have been found in Italy, Austria, Germany, the Netherlands and other countries that had been at the disposition of these "secret armies". As late as 1996, the United Kingdom revealed to the German government the existence of stay-behind weapons and equipment caches in West Berlin. The content of these caches offer an insight into the equipment supplied to (German) stay-behind networks. In two of the secret caches, buried in the Grunewald forest, police found boxes with 9 mm pistols and ammunition, knives, navigation equipment, an RS-6 "spy radio", various manuals, tank- and aircraft-recognition books, a flask of brandy, and chocolate, as well as a copy of Total Resistance, the guerrilla warfare manual written in 1957 by Swiss Major Hans von Dach.

During the Cold War, military stay-behind units were usually long-range reconnaissance, surveillance and target acquisition units that were specifically earmarked for operations in the early phase of a potential war (D-Day to D+1-5). These units would quickly deploy forward, link up with the rear guard or 'aggressive delaying force' and 'stay-behind' as these forces withdrew, letting themselves be bypassed by advancing Warsaw Pact troops. Exploiting pre-reconnoitred hide sites and caches of arms, ammunition, and radios, they would then start to conduct intelligence gathering operations in what is called static covert surveillance as well as target acquisition for high value targets such as enemy headquarters, troop concentrations, and atomic weapons systems. They would also perform demolition tasks, in what was referred to as the 'demolition belt', at places where bottlenecks were likely to occur for enemy formations. Another task would have been escape and evasion (E&E) assistance to downed pilots and others needing repatriation.

The United Kingdom's Territorial Army regiments of SAS and Honourable Artillery Company provided such stay-behind parties in the UK's sector of West Germany.

== List of military stay-behind trained units ==
=== NATO ===
- Special Boat Service (United Kingdom)
- 21 Special Air Service Regiment (Artists) (Reserve) (United Kingdom)
- 23 Special Air Service Regiment (Reserve) (United Kingdom)
- Honourable Artillery Company (United Kingdom)
- Special Reconnaissance Squadron RAC (United Kingdom)
- 4/73 (Sphinx) Special Observation Post Battery RA (United Kingdom)
- 10th Special Forces Group (United States)
- Escadron Spécial de Recherche (SOE/ESR) (Belgium)
- Fernspäher Companies (Germany)
- Korps Commandotroepen (Netherlands)
- 7e Compagnie de Commandos (France)
- 1st Paratroopers Brigade, Lochoi Oreinon Katadromon or LOK (Greece)
- Özel Harp Dairesi (Turkey)

Training was conducted at the International Long Range Reconnaissance Patrol School in Weingarten Germany.

=== Warsaw Pact ===
- MfS-Abteilung IV Spezialkampfführung (East Germany)
- Patriotic Guards (Romania)

=== Other ===
- Fedayeen Saddam (Ba'athist Iraq)
- Projekt-27
- Regional Force Surveillance Units (Australia), units of the Australian Army Reserve that would operate in a stay-behind capacity in the event of an invasion of northern Australia
- Territorial Defense (Yugoslavia), non-secret branch of the Yugoslav People's Army with an official doctrine to wage guerrilla warfare against a potential occupier.

== List of known clandestine stay-behind plans ==
World War II

- Auxiliary Units (United Kingdom)
- Werwolf (Nazi Germany)
- Operation Tracer (Gibraltar)
- Coastwatchers, Australia
- Operation Goldeneye (Gibraltar), designed by Commander Ian Fleming of the British Royal Navy
- Palestine Post-Occupational Scheme (Mandatory Palestine): joint plan between the British SOE and the Palmach to resist a potential Axis occupation before and during the 200 days of dread. SOE Palestine, with assistance from the Jewish Agency, created a secret stay-behind network of cells to resist a potential occupation of Palestine by the Axis. Moshe Dayan set up this clandestine structure. Training for Palmach operatives was conducted at the Special Training Center (STC102) at Mount Carmel near Haifa.

Cold War

- Operations & Intelligence (Netherlands), O&I was unique among its counterparts in other NATO countries in that it operated autonomously from NATO control.
- GLADIO (Italy)
- Aginter Press (Portugal)
- Operation (Red) Sheepskin (Greece)
- Austrian Association of Hiking, Sports and Society (OeWSGV, also: ÖWSGV) (Austria)
- Plan Bleu, La Rose des Vents, and Arc-en-ciel (France)
- ROC (Norway)
- SDRA8 and STC/Mob (Belgium)
- Bund Deutscher Jugend – Technischer Dienst, or TD BJD (Germany-West)
- Kampfgruppe gegen Unmenschlichkeit (A secret stay-behind organisation of West Berlin against the GDR 1948–1959 with strong support of CIA)
- Counter-Guerrilla, Turkish branch of Operation Gladio (Turkey)
- Nihtilä-Haahti plan (Finland)
- Projekt-26 (P-26, Switzerland)
- Arla gryning and Informationsbyrån ('IB') in Sweden.
- Operation Washtub (United States - Alaska Territory)
- Study and Training Group for Military Reconnaissance (West Germany).
- Qashqai 1948–1953 (Iran)

Post-Cold War

- Challenge Project (Ba'athist Iraq)

== See also ==
- Japanese holdout
- Partisan militia
- Free War
