= Gendarmerie (Belgium) =

Former paramilitary police force of Belgium

Belgian Gendarmerie Rijkswacht (Dutch) Gendarmerie (French)
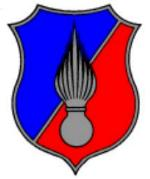
- A flaming grenade is the symbol of the gendarmerie forces

Agency overview
- Formed: 10 July 1796 – 1 January 1992 (as military unit); 1 January 1992 – 1 April 2001 (as civilian organization)
- Dissolved: 2001
- Superseding agency: Federal Police

Jurisdictional structure
- Operations jurisdiction: Belgium
- General nature: Gendarmerie; Civilian police

Operational structure
- Parent agency: Ministry of Defence (1978–1992); Ministry of the Interior (1992–2001)

Notables
- Significant Battles: WWI WWII Années de plomb (Years of lead)

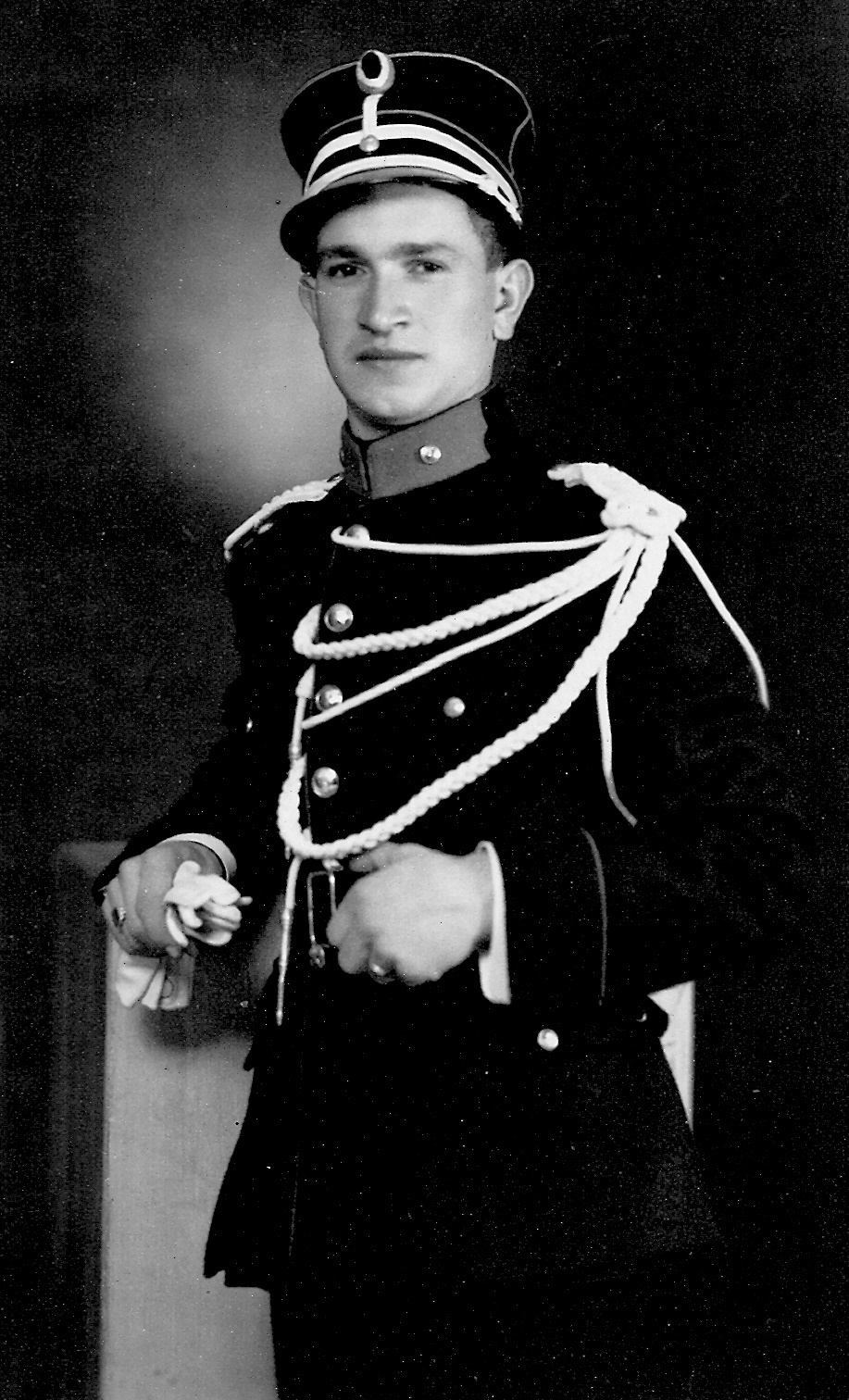
A portrait of a member of the Belgian Rijkswacht/Gendarmerie in 1947

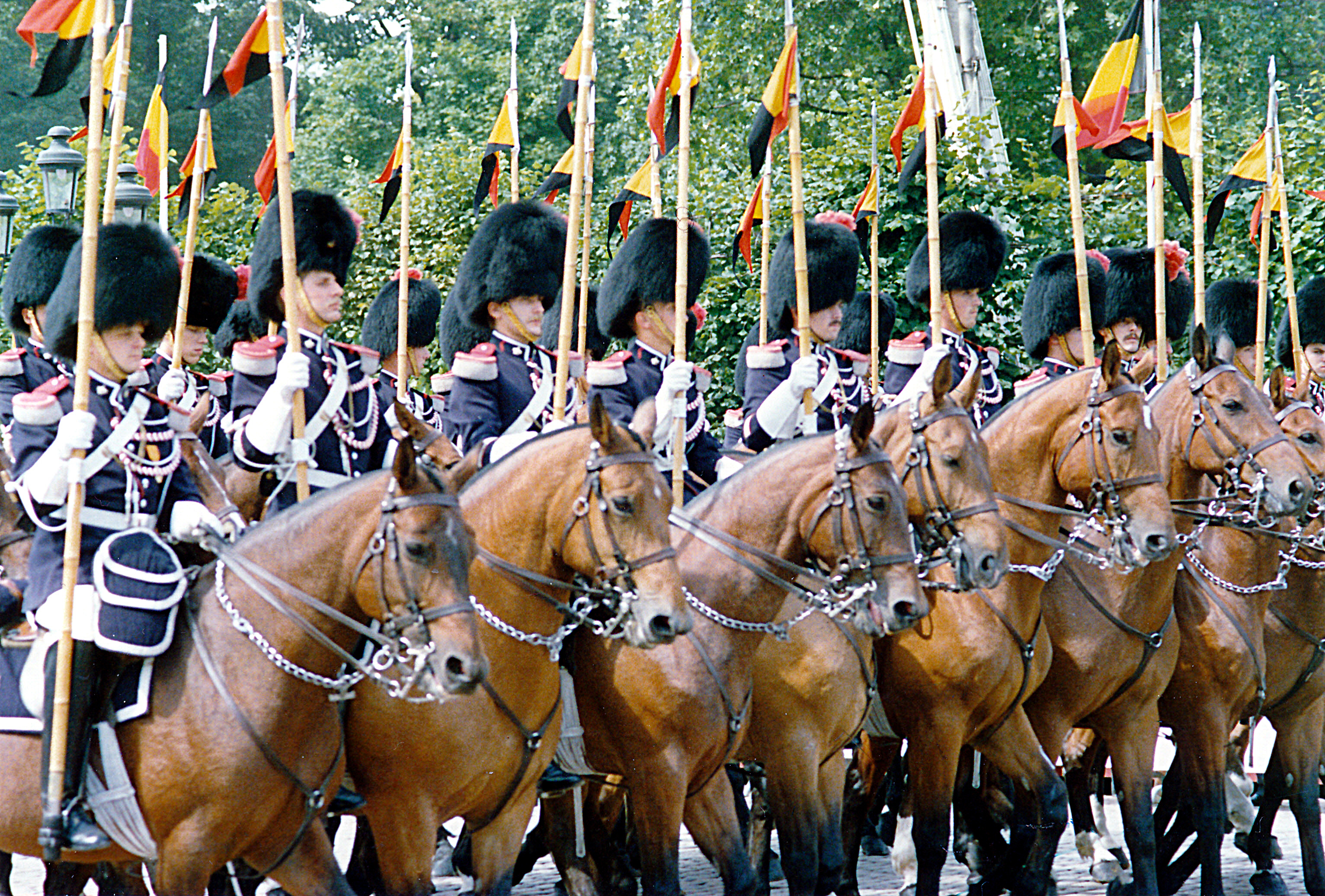
Royal Horse escort parading in front of the royal tribune during the parade, Place des Palais on 21 July 1989 in Brussels.

The Gendarmerie (French) or Rijkswacht (Dutch) was the former national Gendarmerie force of the Kingdom of Belgium. It became a civilian police organisation in 1992, a status it retained until 1 January 2001, when it was, together with the other existing police forces in Belgium, abolished and replaced by the Federal Police and the Local Police.

== History ==
=== Etymology ===
The word gendarme comes from Old French gens d'armes, meaning men-at-arms, whereas the Dutch name, rijkswacht, means guard of the realm (lit. 'realm protection').

=== Pre-independence ===
In 1795, the Belgian provinces came under French rule. It was at this time that the Rijkswacht/Gendarmerie was created. This military force had been created a short time before in France itself to replace the Marechaussee (mounted corps of marshals) of the former monarchy. The legislation which organised the new gendarmerie service in Belgium was a law dated 17 April 1798, which remained in force until 1957.

In 1815, the Belgian provinces became part of the United Kingdom of the Netherlands, ruled by King William I. The Dutch renamed the Gendarmerie the "Royal Marechaussee" and reorganised the force.

=== Belgium ===
In 1830 the Belgian Revolution occurred. After obtaining its independence, the new Belgian state created its own national Rijkswacht/Gendarmerie on the basis of the already existing constabulary. The Rijkswachters/Gendarmes operated throughout the country. From its creation, the Rijkswacht/Gendarmerie was formally part of the Belgian Army.

The major strikes and tense social conditions of the 1930s brought important changes in the organization of the Rijkswacht/Gendarmerie, in particular through the expansion of the mobile units created in 1913. In 1938 a ceremonial Royal Escort was created as part of the Gendarmerie, wearing the full dress uniform that had distinguished mounted gendarmes prior to 1914.

During the Second World War, the Rijkswacht/Gendarmerie was restricted to the role of administrative and legal police force, primarily concerned with road traffic. The majority of the Rijkswachters/Gendarmes refused to collaborate with the German occupiers. It is believed that individual gendarmes assisted the Belgian Resistance. These actions were not tolerated by the occupation authorities and from 1942 onwards the corps was deprived of many of its functions.

After the war, the service was reorganized. New units were created, and at the end of 1957, new legislation relating to the fundamental role of the Rijkswacht/Gendarmerie was passed, envisaged in the Constitution of 1830. This law confirmed the functions of the Rijkswacht/Gendarmerie and its independence from the administrative authorities. The Rijkswacht/Gendarmerie was separated from the Belgian Army Territorial Defense Force, and became a fourth department within the military. The Rijkswacht/Gendarmerie was also authorised to create its own training establishments.

During the 1960s conditions of service improved considerably. This period also saw a major increase in serious crimes (holdups, drug violations, terrorism, etc.). The Central Bureau of Investigations (CBO – Centraal Bureau voor Opsporingen (Dutch), BCR – Bureau Central des Recherches) was created, as well as a centralized radio network. Tracker dogs were employed for the first time.

In 1972, in response to the Munich massacre, the Rijkswacht/Gendarmerie established a specialist anti-terrorist unit Brigade Diane.

During the 1980s, the Rijkswacht/Gendarmerie suffered serious problems. Much of its equipment was outdated, it was significantly understrength, and there were serious financial issues. It was also the period of fighting communist cells (CCC), serious and deadly criminal activities by gangs (like the Brabant killers, a case that was never solved) and hooliganism (Heysel Stadium disaster). Several parliamentary commissions blamed the Rijkswacht/Gendarmerie for poor investigations and law enforcement work in these cases. The Rijkswacht/Gendarmerie was threatened with disbandment, and drastic measures were taken to reorganise several units and to improve public relations.

=== Demilitarisation ===
Logo as civilian police organisation

In 1991 the Rijkswacht/Gendarmerie was transferred from the Ministry of Defence to the Ministry of the Interior, and on 1 January 1992, it lost its formal military status, resulting in major changes in policies, procedures, and staff regulation. Demilitarisation allowed the force to concentrate all its resources on civilian police work. Its military functions, as well as the supervision of the Ministry of Defence, were removed.

This restructuring occurred after the 'black' 1980s of the Brabant killers, Heysel Stadium disaster, Cellules Communistes Combattantes (CCC), and other criminal and terrorist activity, against which the Gendarmerie was deemed ineffective.

=== Disbandment ===
At the end of the 1990s, following adverse reports arising from the Dutroux Affair, the Belgian government decided to dissolve the existing police forces. The parliamentary commission, which investigated the errors that were made during the search for the missing children, stated that the three police organisations did not work effectively and efficiently together. There were problems with cooperation and vital information was not exchanged.

Parliament, both the majority and the opposition, decided to abolish the existing structures, and created a new police organisation, structured in two departments: the Federal Police and the Local Police. In 2001, the Rijkswacht/Gendarmerie was dissolved.

== Ranks ==
The ranks of the Rijkswacht/Gendarmerie were:

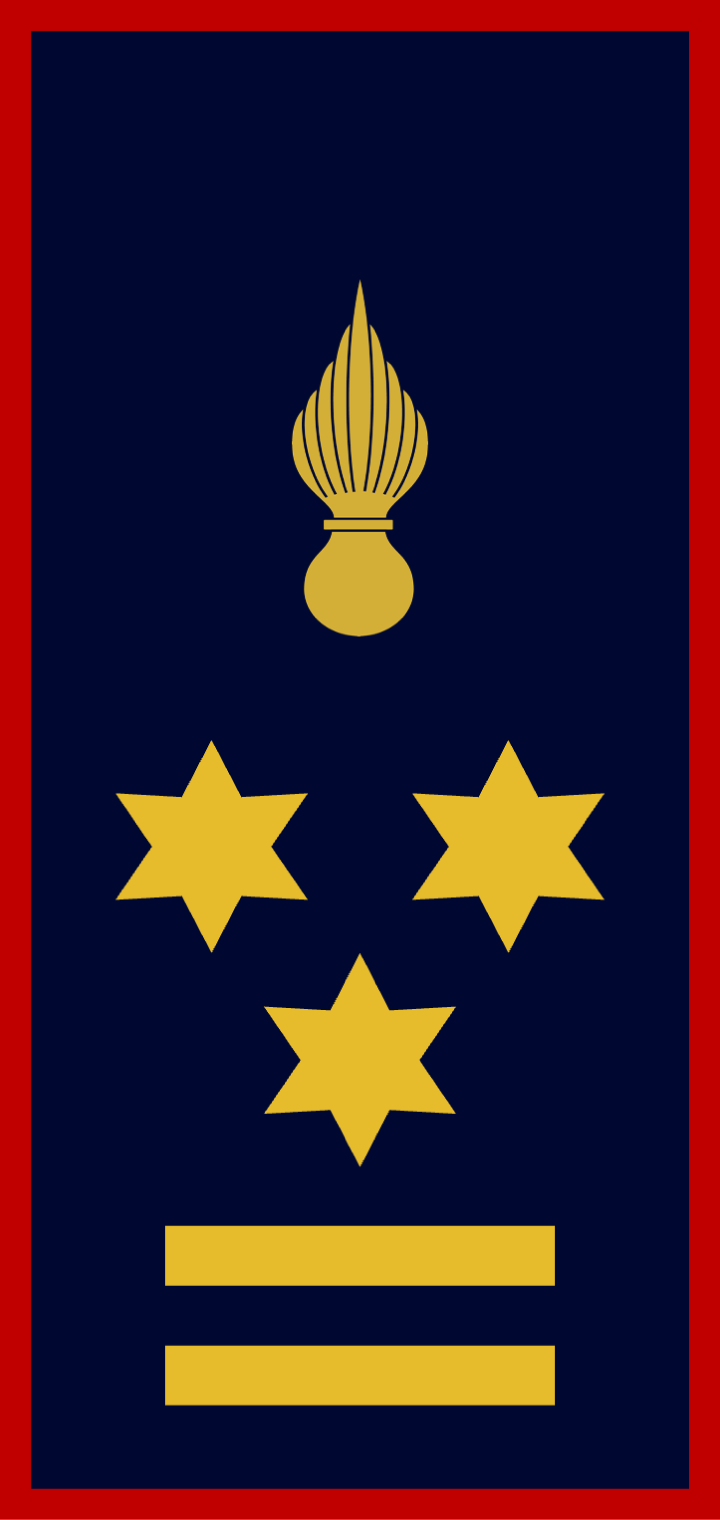
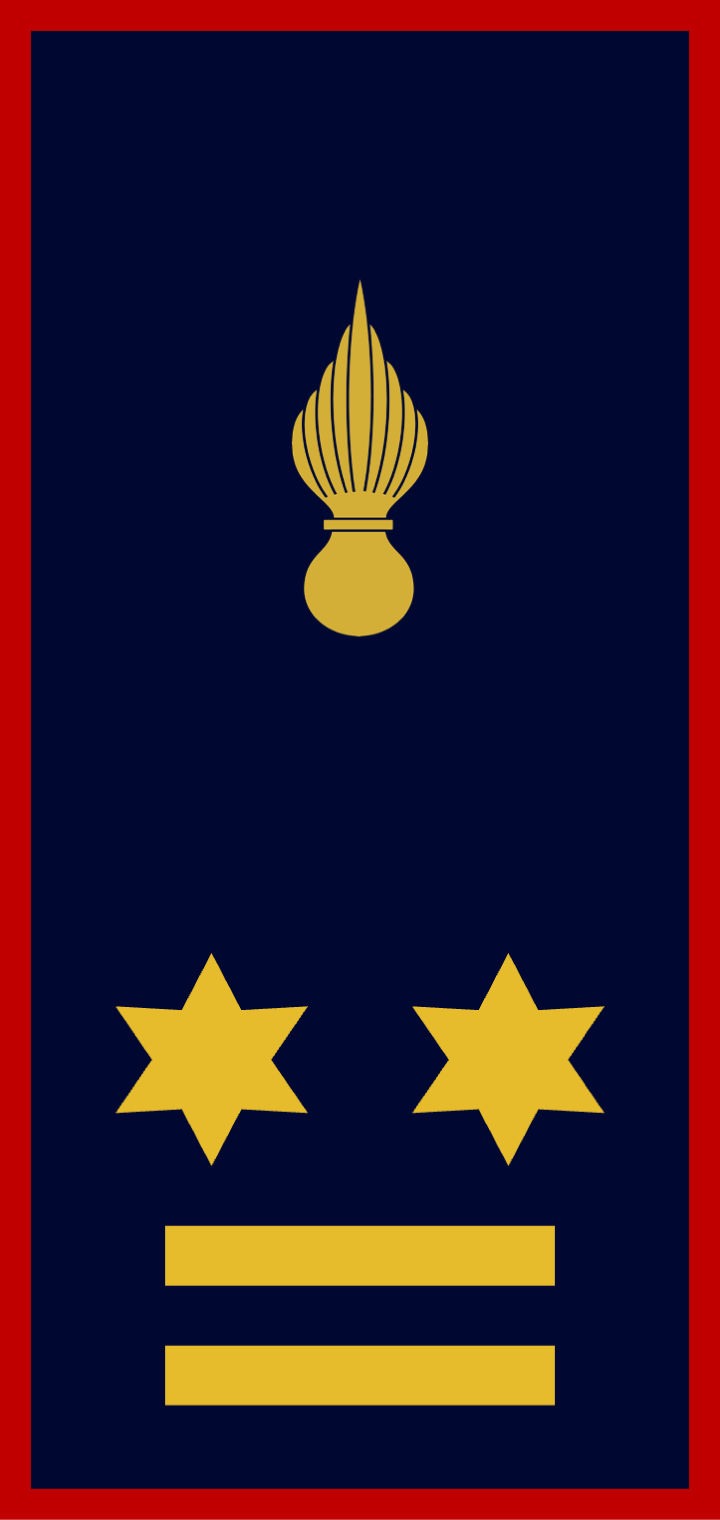
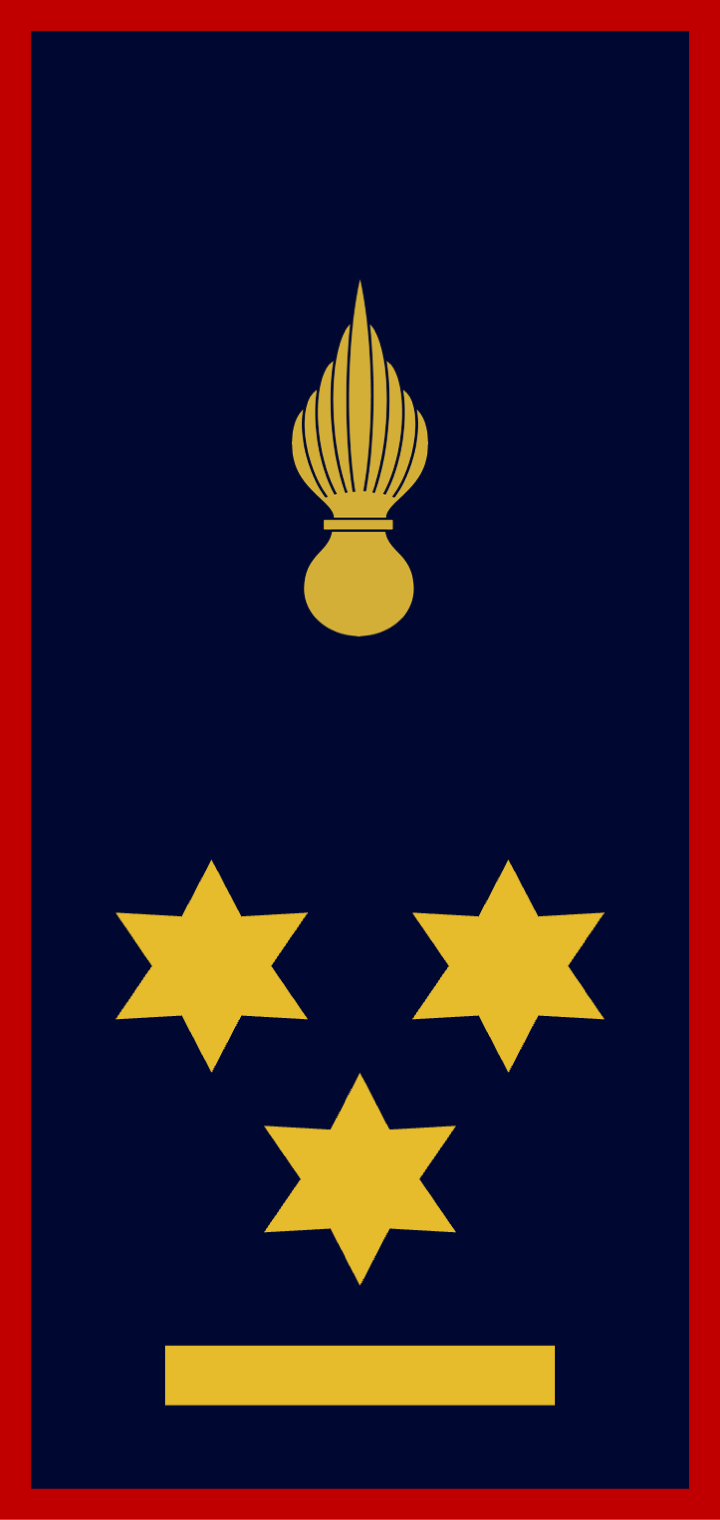
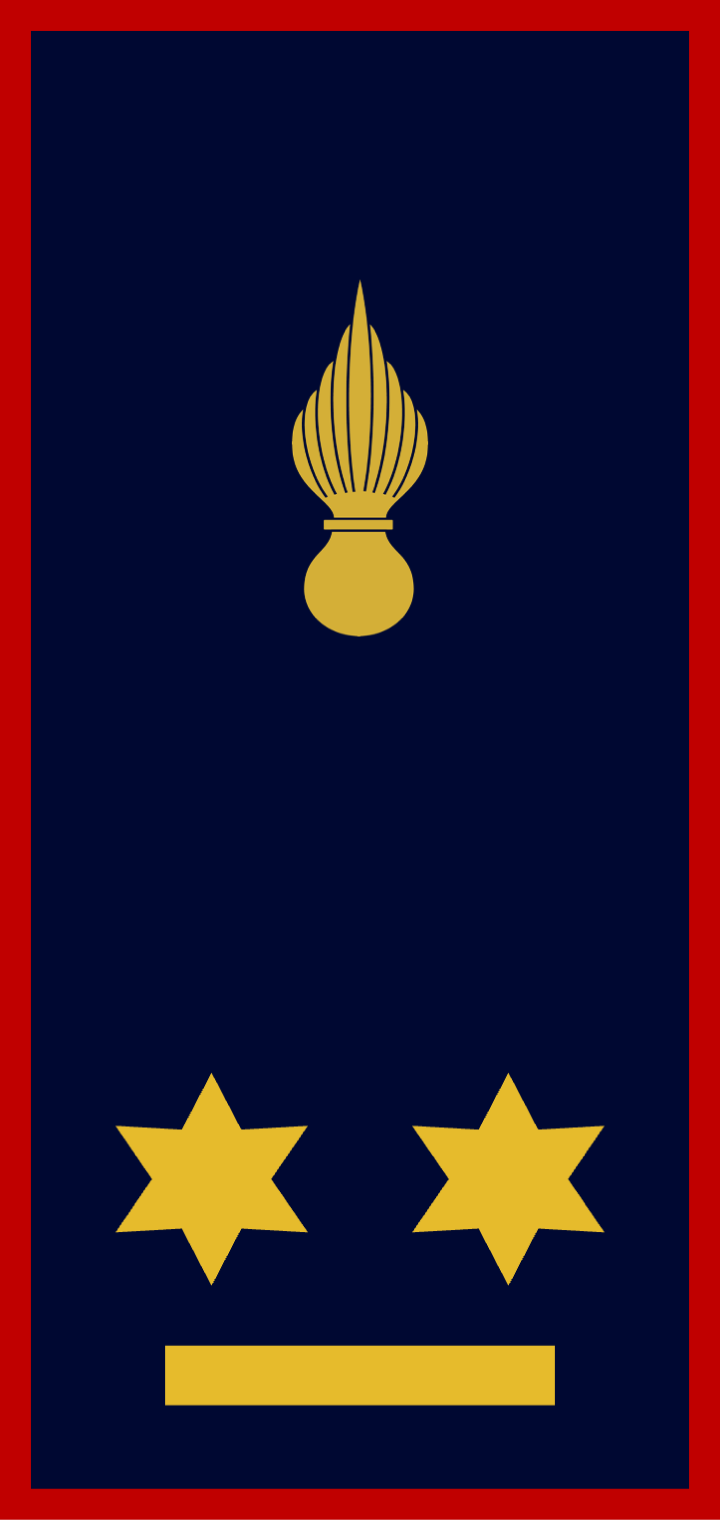
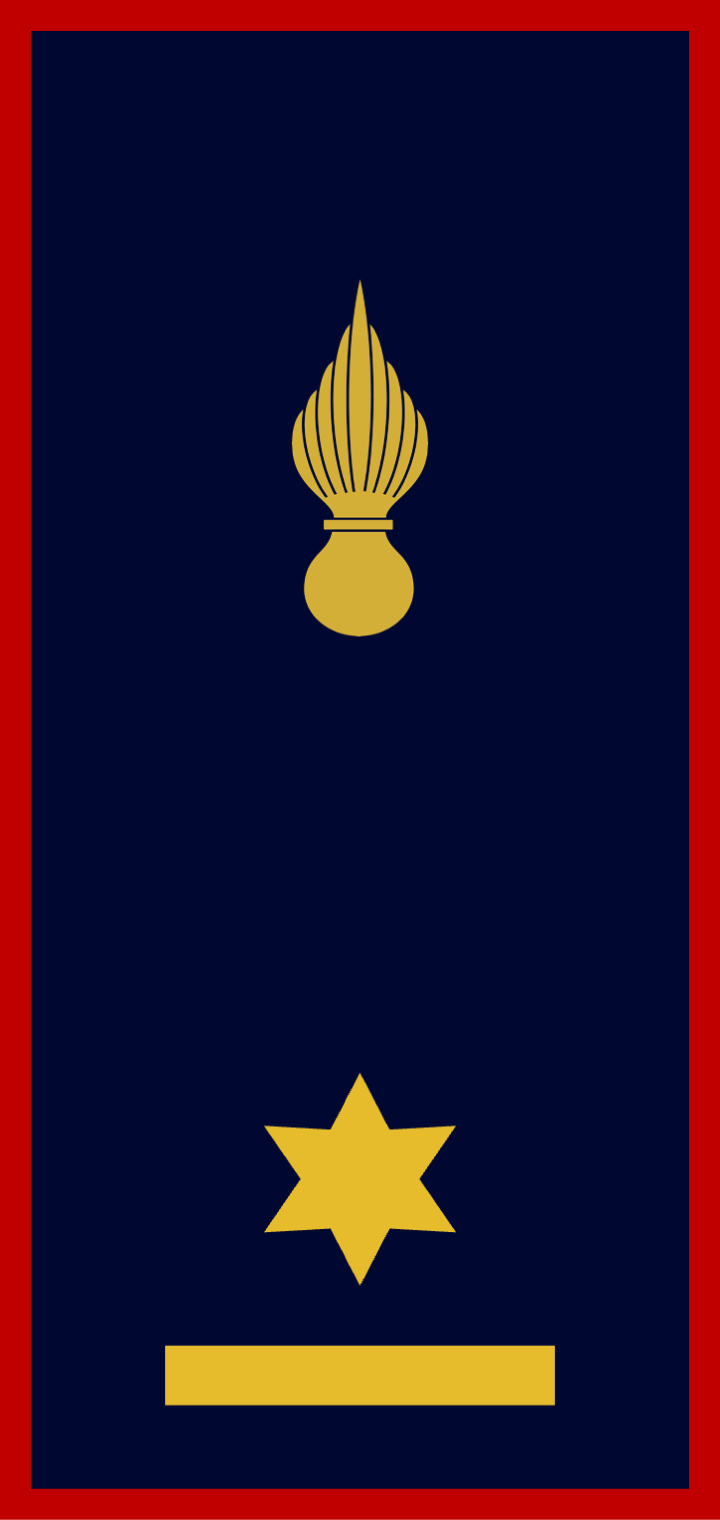
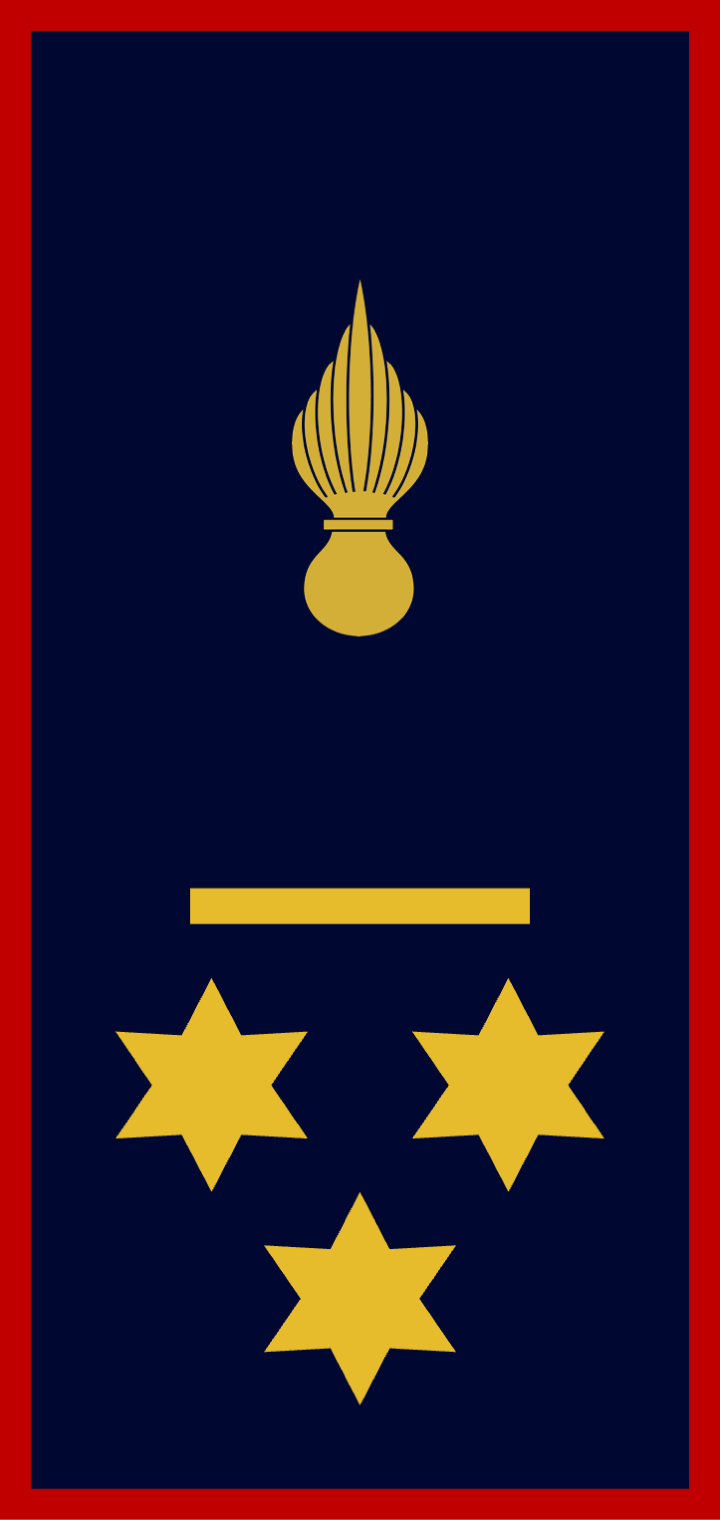
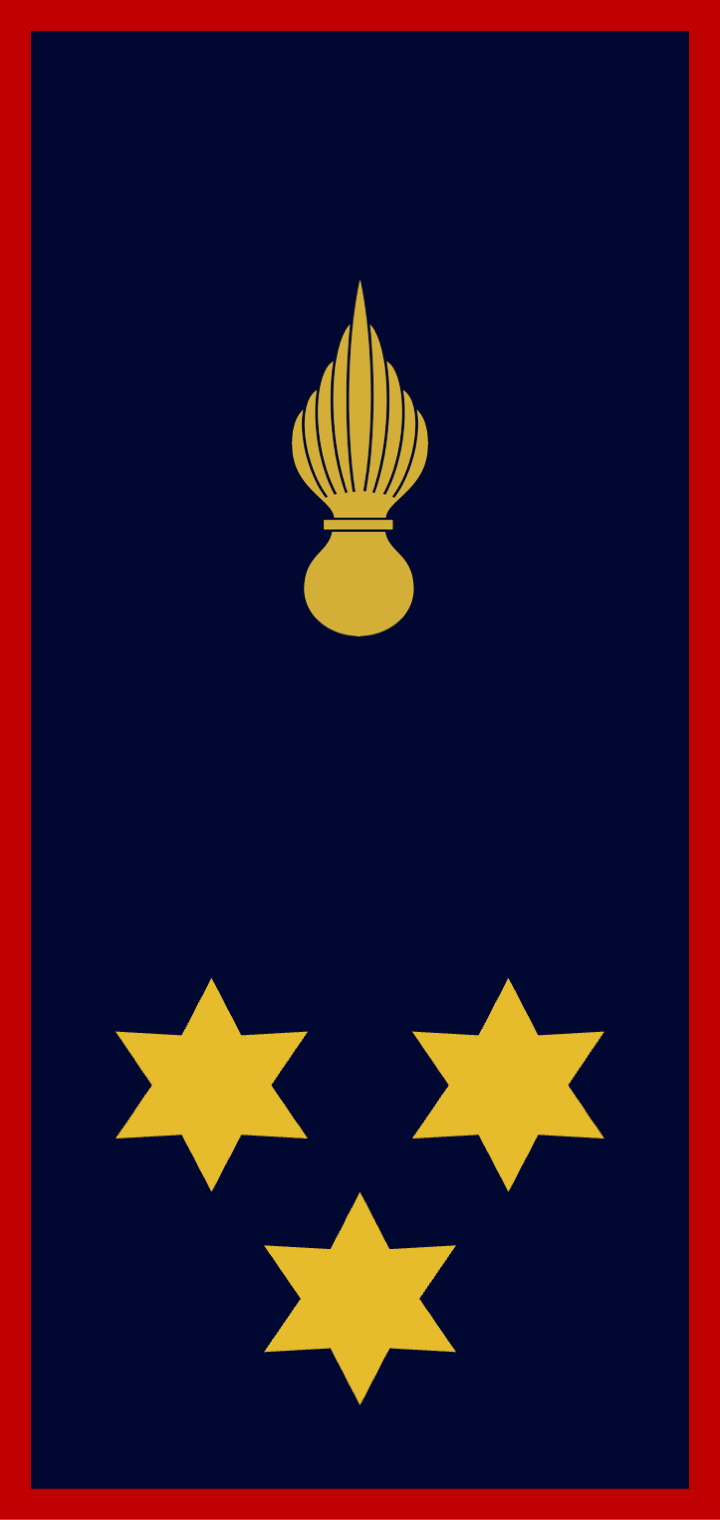
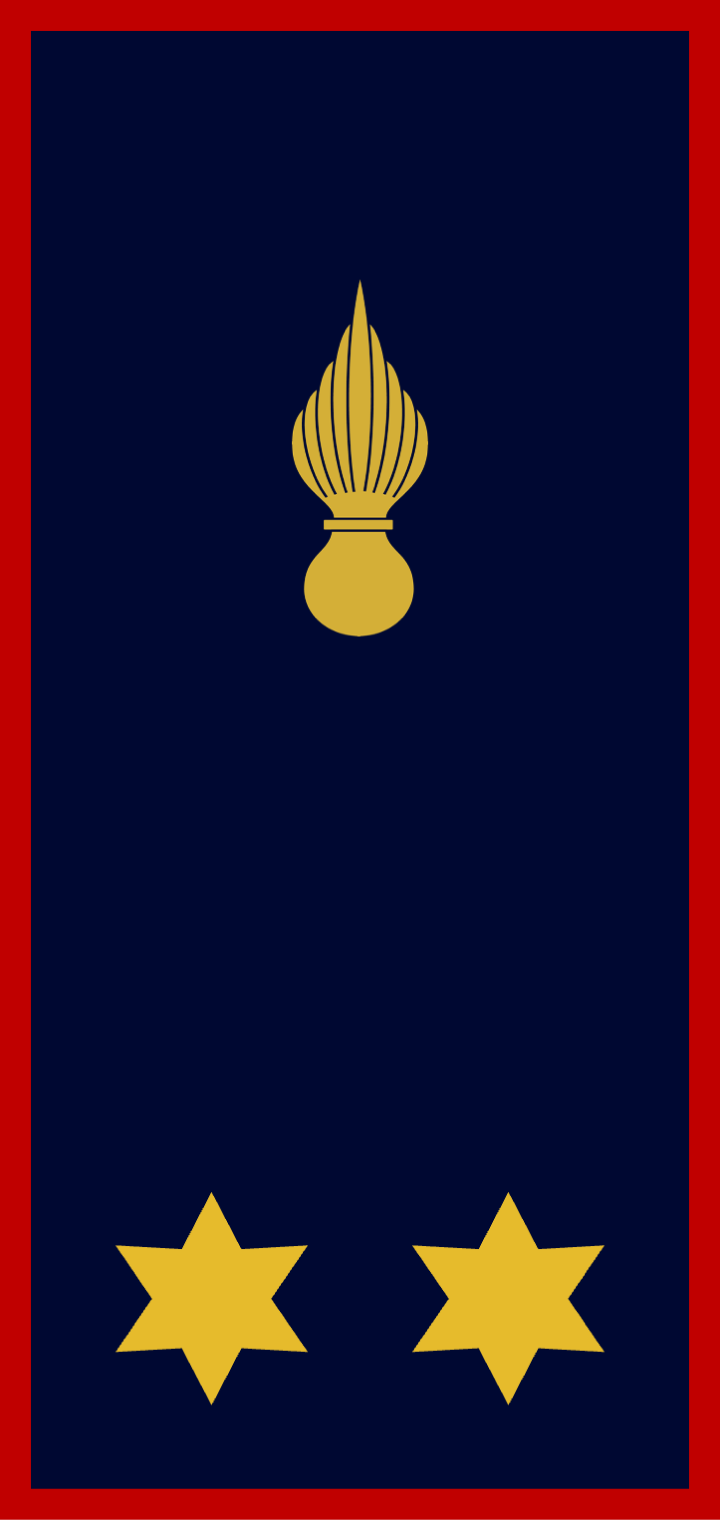
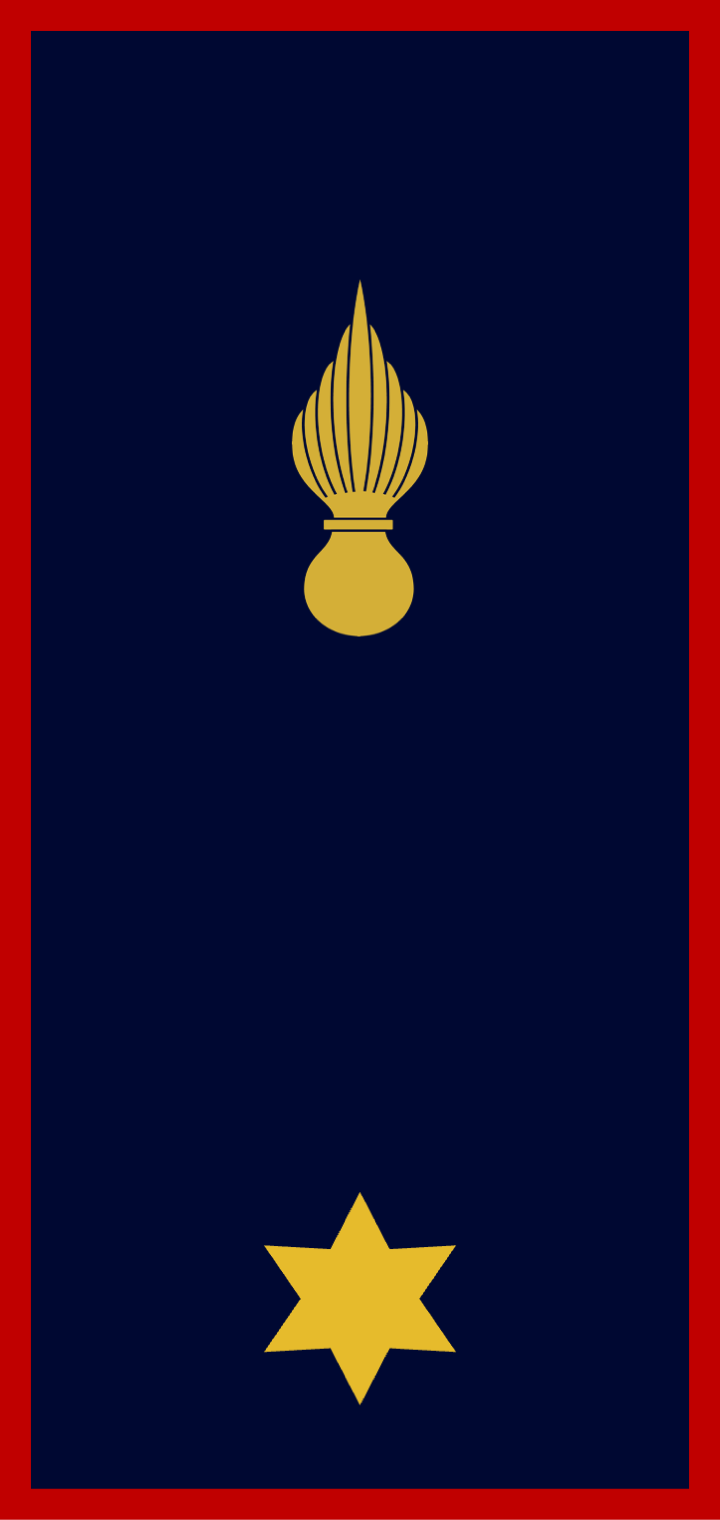
Rank group	General / flag officers		Senior officers				Junior officers
Belgian Gendarmerie (c. 1988)
Belgian Gendarmerie (c. 1988)	Luitenant-generaal	Generaal-majoor	Kolonel	Luitenant-kolonel	Majoor	Kapitein-commandant	Kapitein	Luitenant	Onderluitenant
Belgian Gendarmerie (c. 1988)	Lieutenant général	Général-major	Colonel	Lieutenant-colonel	Major	Capitaine-commandant	Capitaine	Lieutenant	Sous-lieutenant
Belgian Gendarmerie (c. 1988)	Generalleutnant	Generalmajor	Oberst	Oberstleutnant	Major	Stabshauptmann	Hauptmann	Leutnant	Unterleutnant

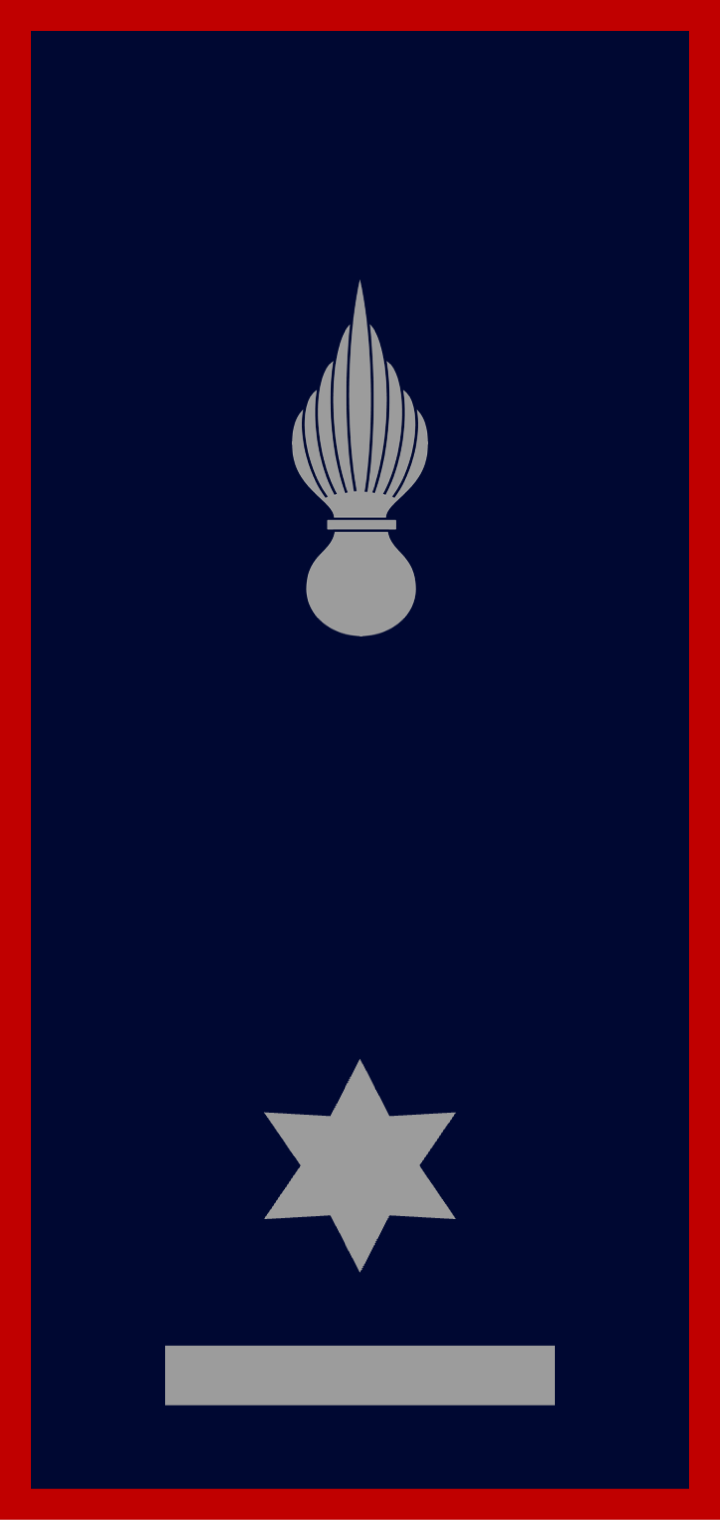
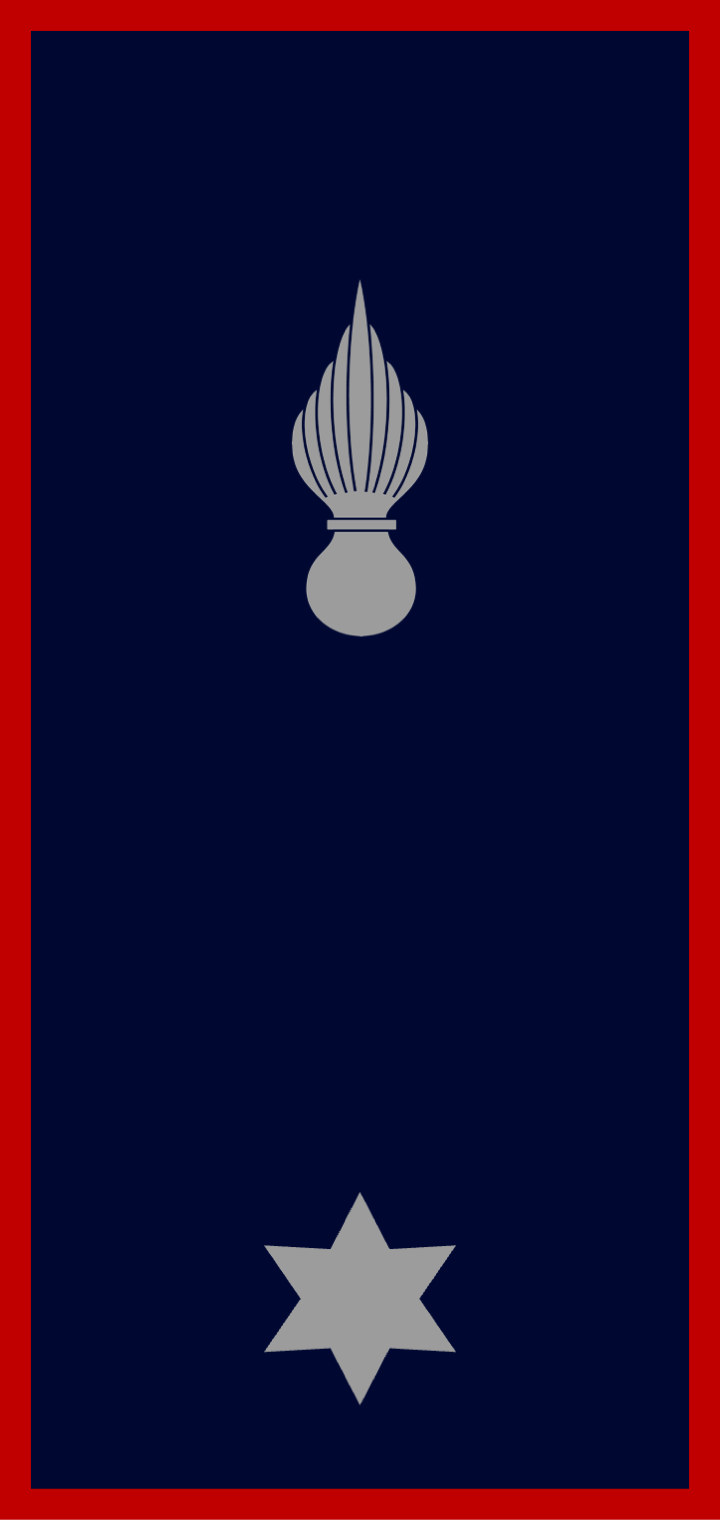
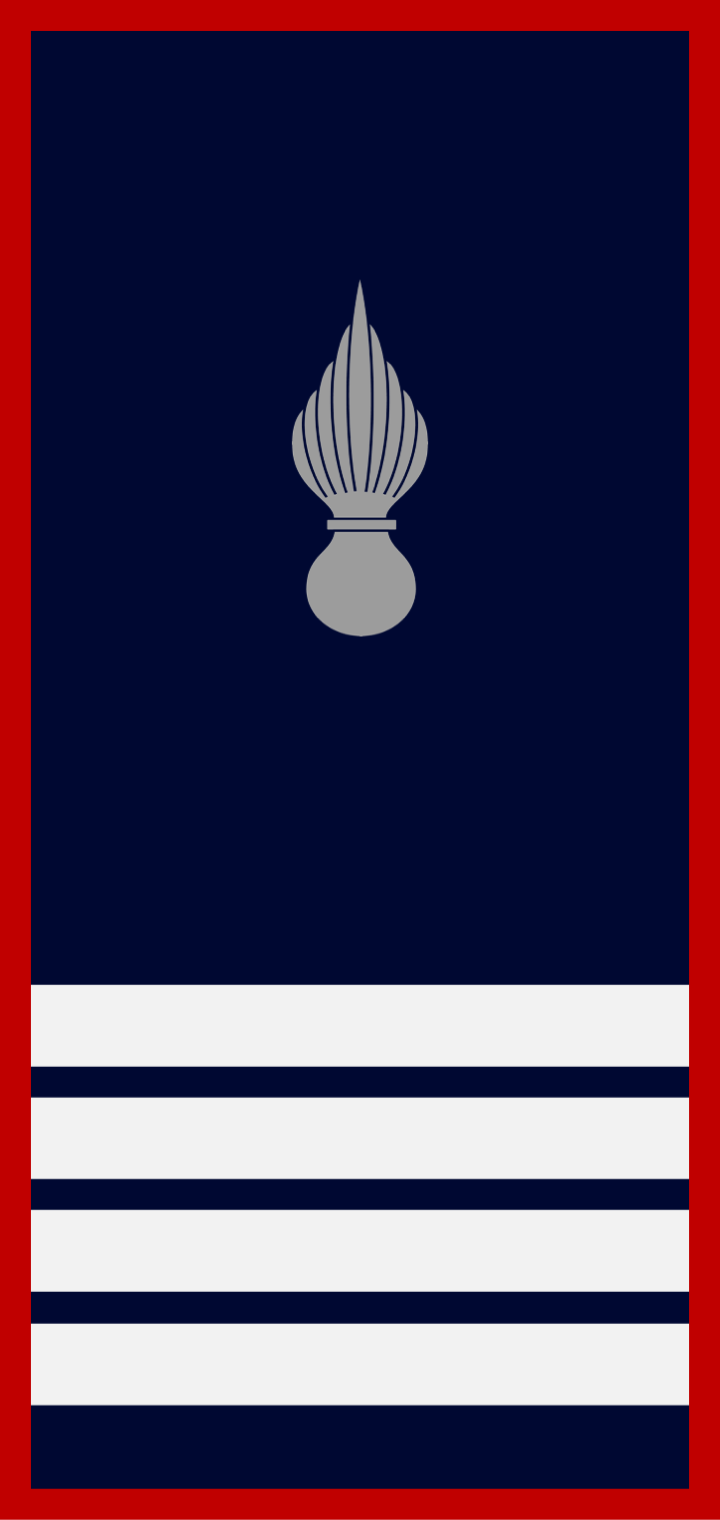
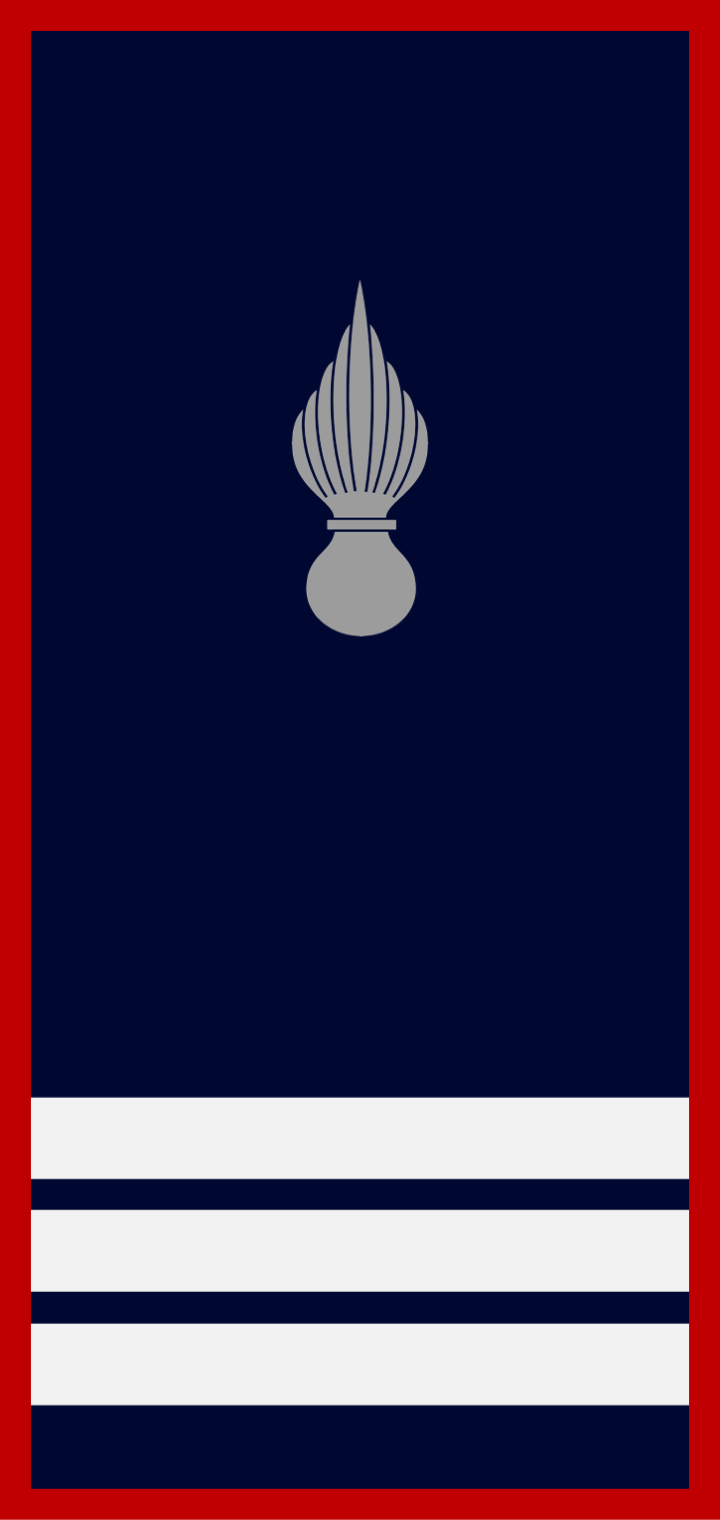
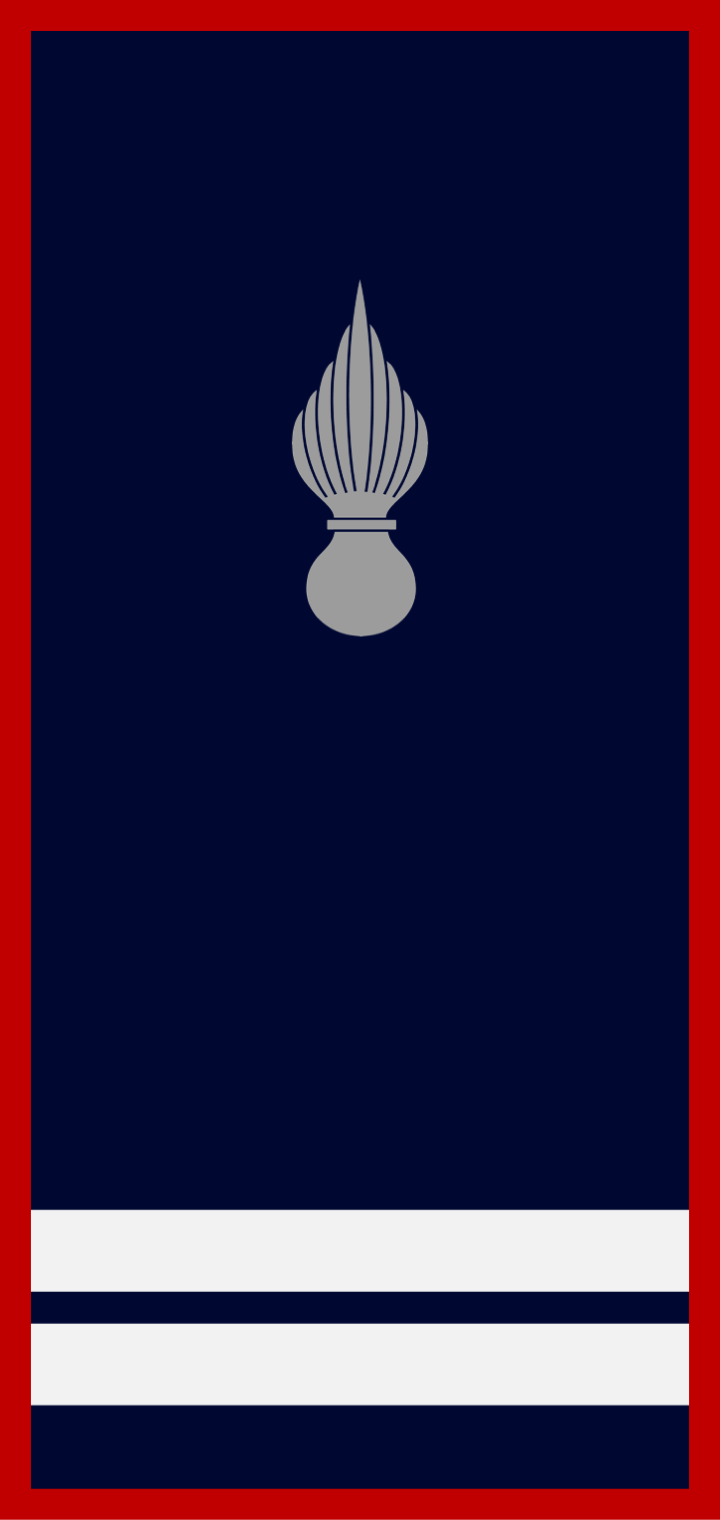
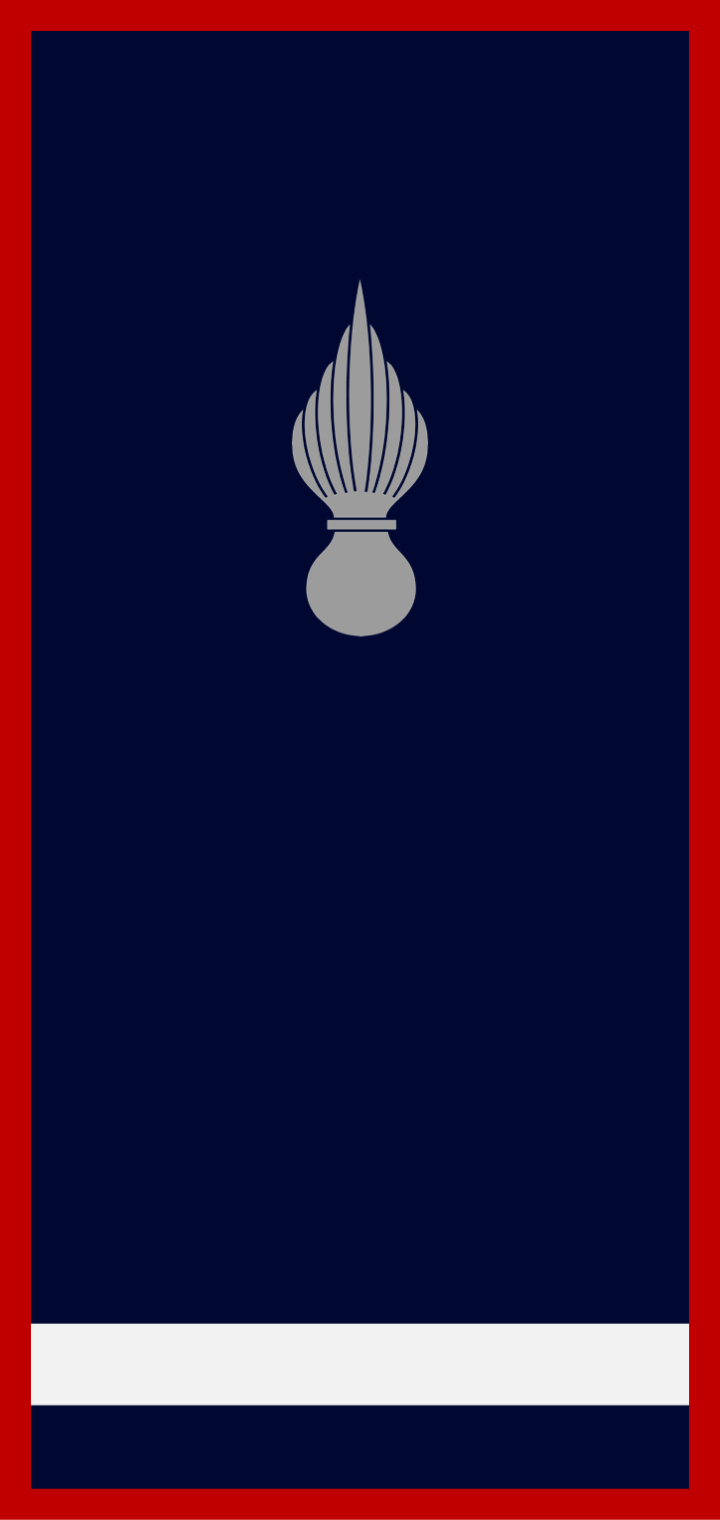
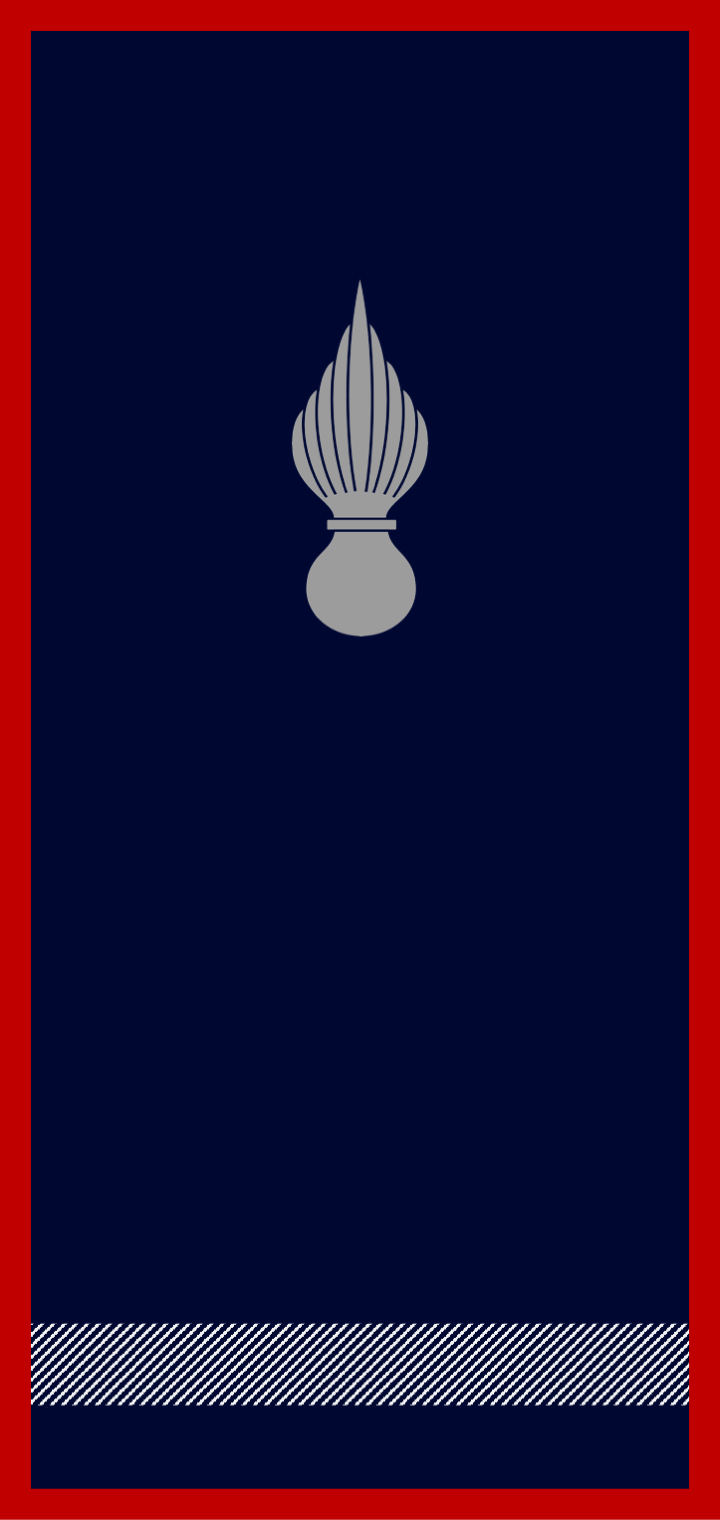
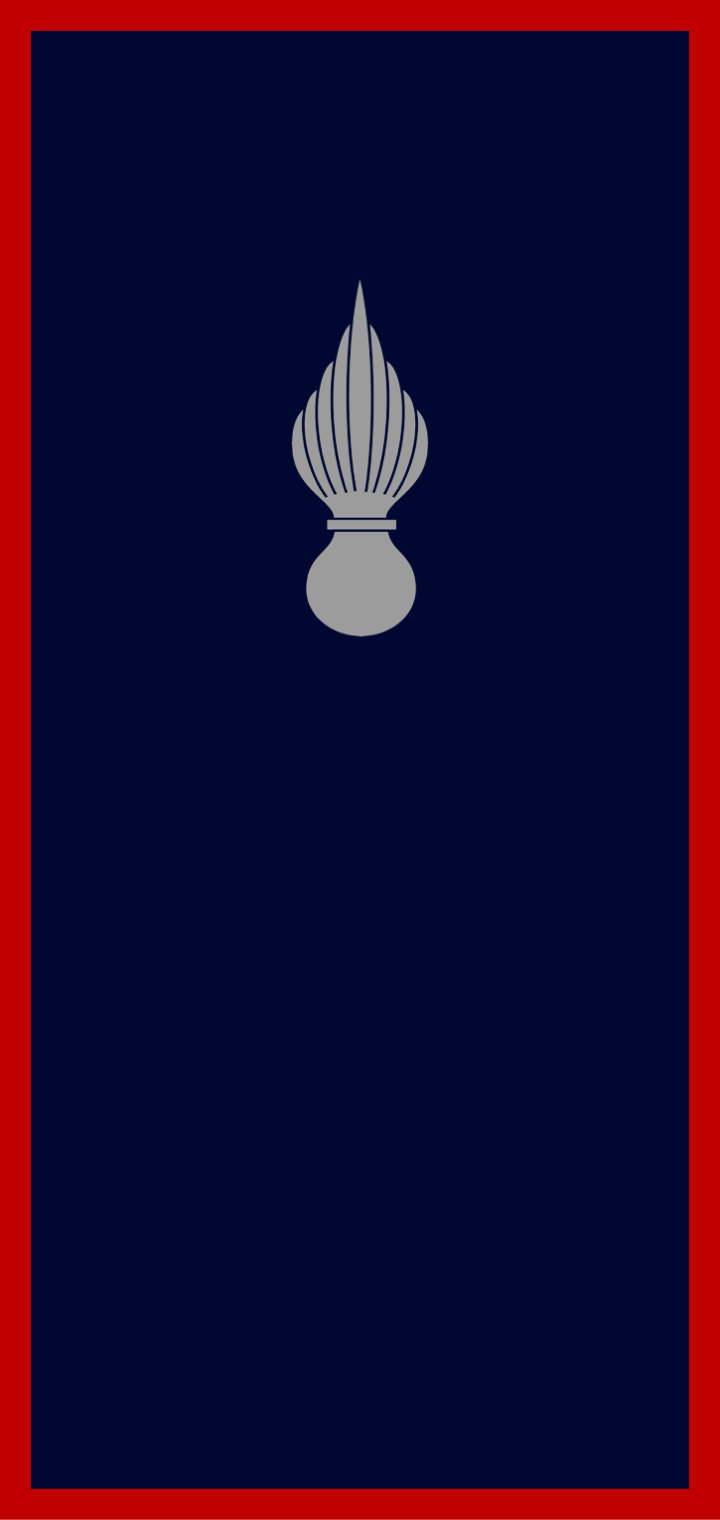
Rank group	Senior NCOs						Junior NCOs	Enlisted
Belgian Gendarmerie (c. 1988)
Belgian Gendarmerie (c. 1988)	Adjudant-chef	Adjudant	1ste opperwachtmeester	Opperwachtmeester	1ste wachtmeester	Wachtmeester		Brigadeer (after six months of training)	Rijkswachter (first six months of training)
Belgian Gendarmerie (c. 1988)	Adjudant-chef	Adjudant	1é maréchal des logis-chef	Maréchal des logis-chef	1é maréchal des logis	Maréchal des logis		Brigadier	Gendarme
Belgian Gendarmerie (c. 1988)	Chefadjudant	Adjudant	1er Hauptwachtmeister	Hauptwachtmeister	1er Wachtmeister	Wachtmeister		-	-

== Uniforms ==
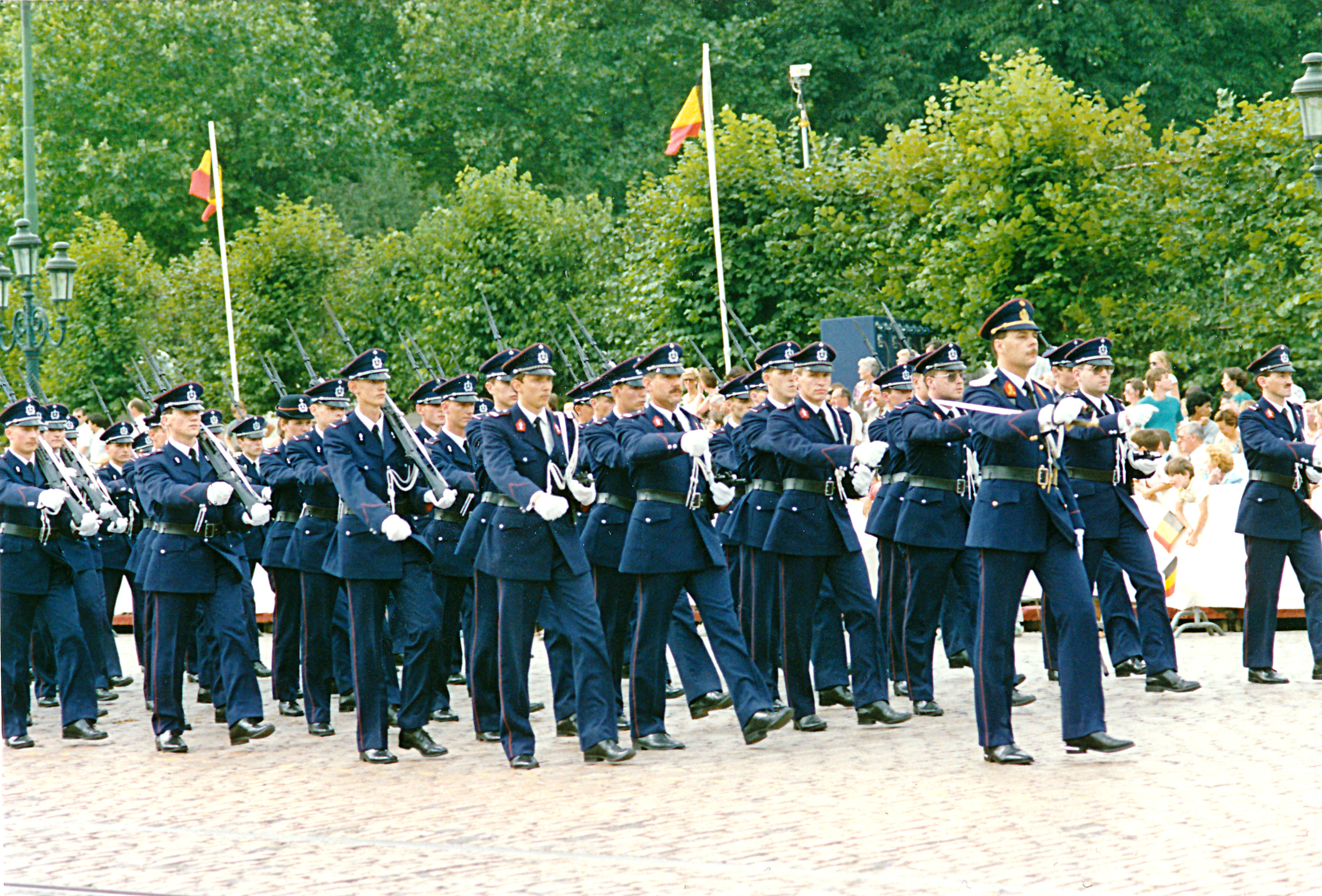
Parade of students from the Royal School of the Gendarmerie in front of the king Albert II on 21 July 1989

During much of its history the Rijkswacht/Gendarmerie wore a distinctive black and red uniform with high-collared tunics, white aiguillettes and wide topped kepis, dating from the nineteenth century (see first photograph above). In simplified form, this was retained as full dress wear until the late 1960s. It was thereafter replaced by a more modern uniform comprising a dark blue peaked cap with red piping, dark blue coat with open collar and red Gendarmerie insignia, a light blue shirt with tie, dark blue trousers with red piping (a single stripe on the side of the leg) and the distinctive shoulder rank insignia.

All modern Belgian police officers wear a "soft" civilian style uniform in keeping with the image required by the Community Oriented Policing-strategy.

== Complement ==
1796: 1,080 Gendarmeries, including 76 officers and 1,002 lower ranks.

1830: 1,201 hommes répartis en 45 officiers + 1 156 gradés et gendarmes;

1866: 2,232 hommes répartis en 51 officiers + 2 181 gradés et gendarmes;

1914: 4,325 hommes répartis en 85 officiers + 4 240 gradés et gendarmes;

1921: 6,830 hommes répartis en 156 officiers + 6 674 gradés et gendarmes;

1960: 12,850 Gendarmes; including 350 officers and 12,500 lower ranks.

1969: 14,050 Gendarmes; including 550 officers + 13,500 lower ranks.

1975: 16,970 Gendarmes, including 870 officers and 16,100 lower ranks.

1980s: 18,000 Gendarmes

1986: 17,000 Gendarmes

1989: 15,900 Gendarmes

== Equipment ==
=== Aircraft ===
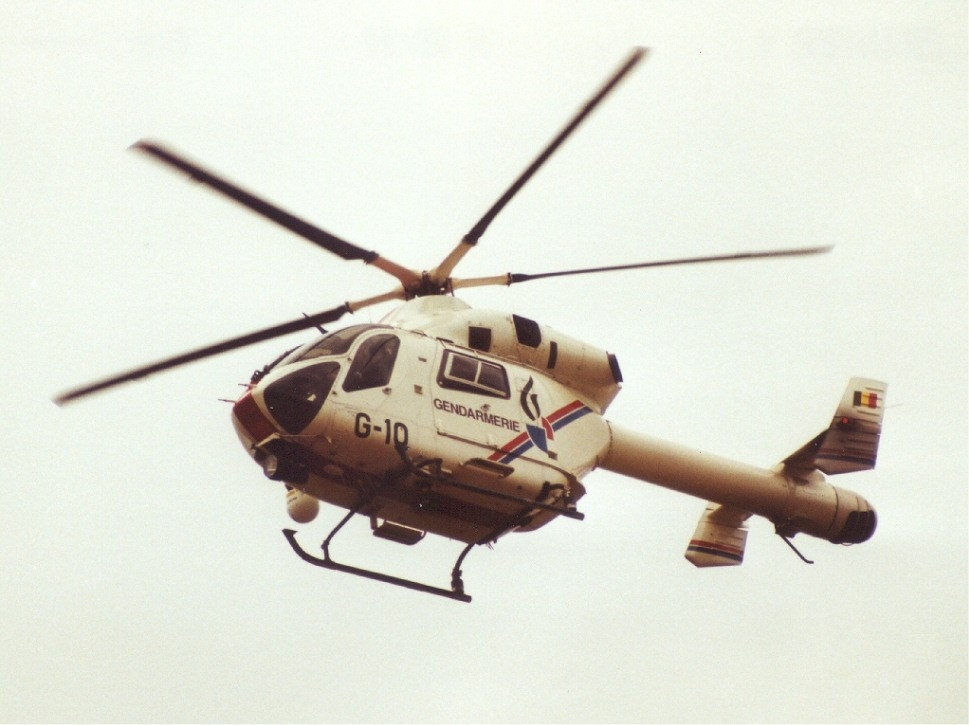
Helicopter McDonnell Douglas MD-900 of the Rijkswacht/Gendarmerie

Aircraft	Origin	Variants	Service period	Role	Notes
Fairey Britten-Norman Islander	Belgian / United Kingdom	BN-2T	1993–1995		1 aircraft
Cessna 182 Skylane	United States	182Q, 182R	1994–2001		Four aircraft
Aerospatiale Alouette II	France	SA.318C Astazou	1968–1999		Six helicopters
Sud Aviation SA.330L Puma	France	SA.330C, SA.330H, SA.330L	1973–1994		Three helicopters
MD Helicopters MD 500	United States	MD.520N	1999–2001		Two helicopters
MD Helicopters MD Explorer	United States	MD 900 Explorer	1997–2001		Five helicopters

=== Firearms ===
- 9mm semiautomatic FN Uzi Submachine Gun
- 9mm semiautomatic Browning Hi-Power Pistol
- 12 Gauge Winchester 1200 Pump-Action Shotgun
- 9mm H&K MP5 Submachine Gun (only by Group Diane, the SWAT team).
- 7.62mm FN FAL Battle rifle. Used with adjusted ammunition to fire rounds of teargas during riots.

=== Vehicles ===
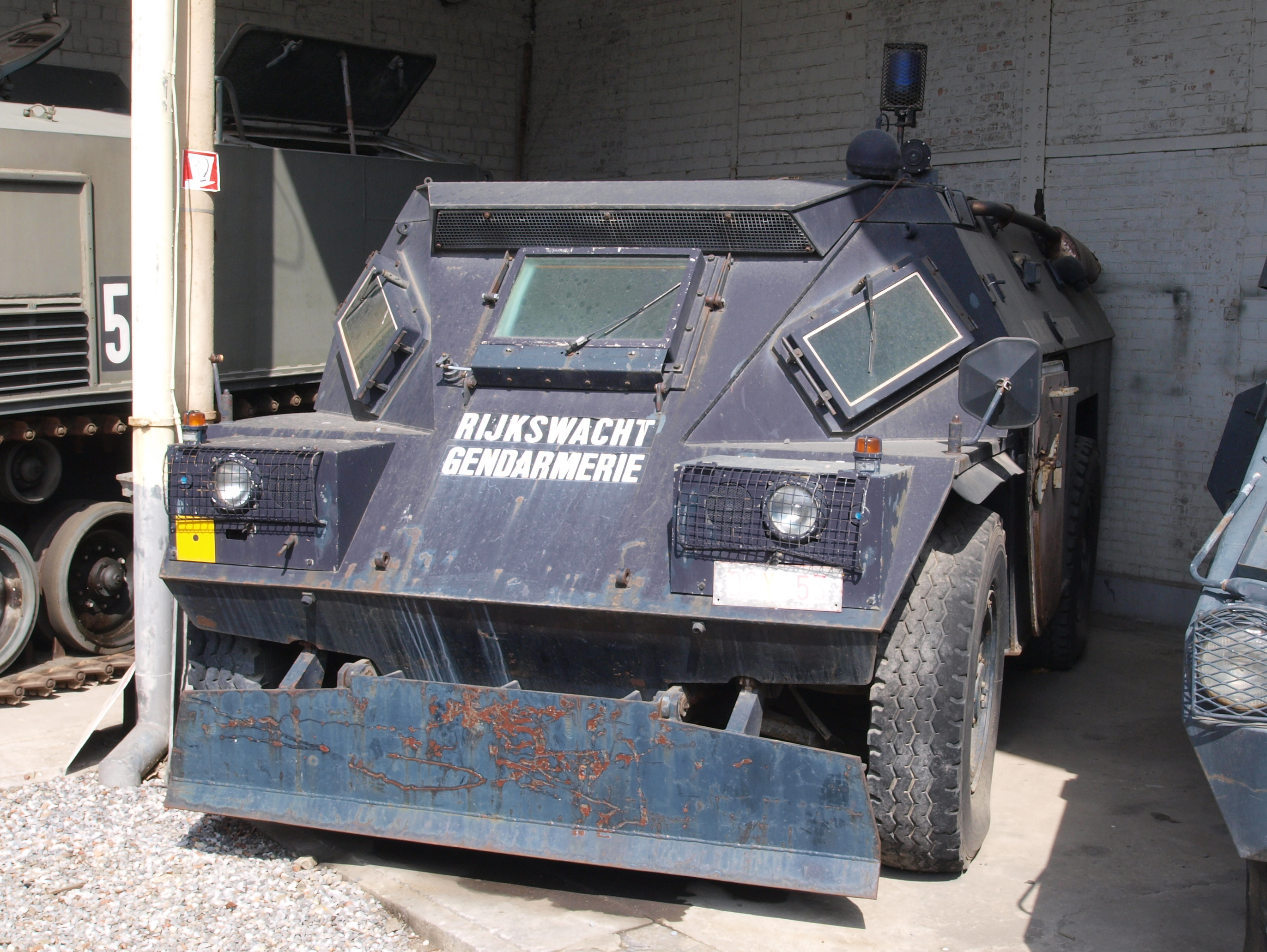
BDX wheeled APC

- VW Transporter (used for intervention)
- Toyota Corolla (used for administrative work)
- Citroën AX (also used for administrative work)
- VW Golf GTI (used for intervention)
- Opel Astra (intervention)
- Opel Astra Break (K9)
- Peugeot 306 break (K9)
- Pontiac Trans Sport
- Porsche 911 (intervention)
- 80 BDX wheeled APCs
- Iveco 40.10WM-14 4x4 (used during demonstrations where the rijkswacht/gendarmerie acted as anti-riot police).
- MOL MSB18 number 5 (used during demonstrations where the rijkswacht/gendarmerie acted as anti-riot police). Equipped with high pressure water canons.

== Media references ==
- A Rijkswacht roadblock was included in a TV skit by the comedy duo Gaston en Leo.
- Topic of a song, "Bij De Rijkswacht" ("At the Rijkswacht"), by the Antwerp novelty band "De Strangers. Using the melody of the Village People's "In The Navy".

== Gallery ==
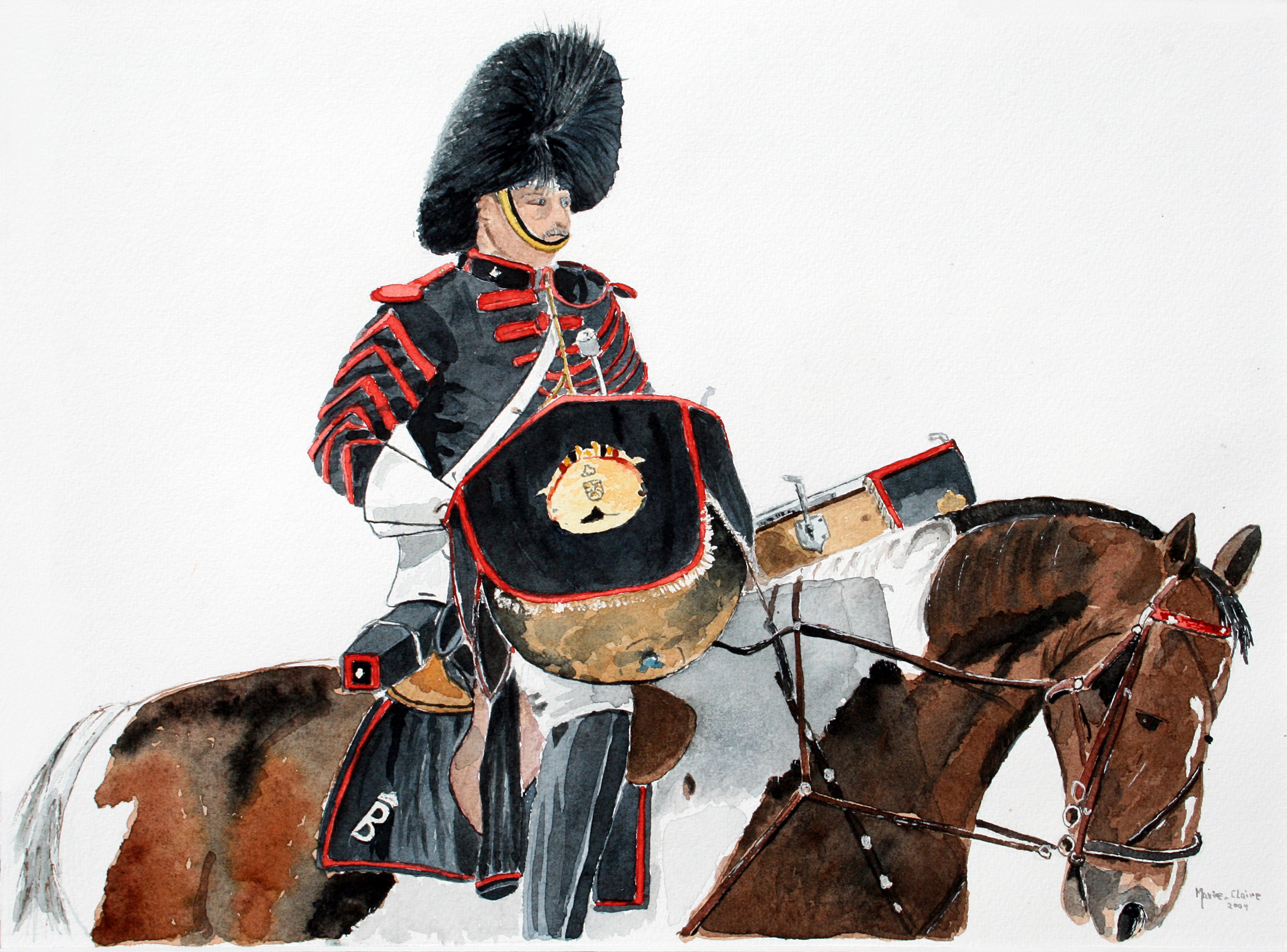
Timpanist of the Royal Horse Escort, 21 July 1989.

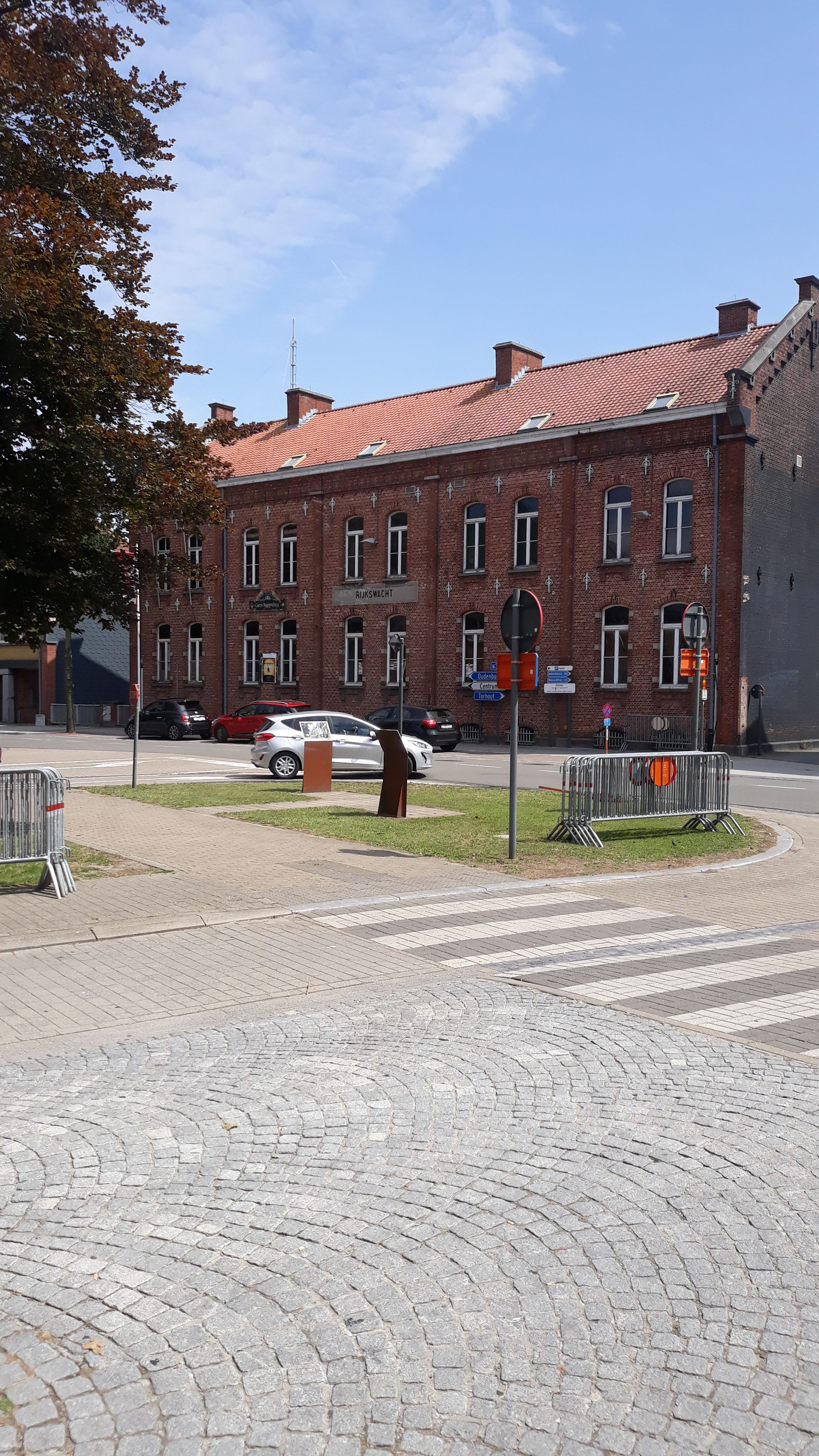
Old Gendarmerie station in Gistel.

== See also ==
- Law enforcement in Belgium
- Police vehicles in Belgium
- Garde Civique
