= Belgian Royal Escort =

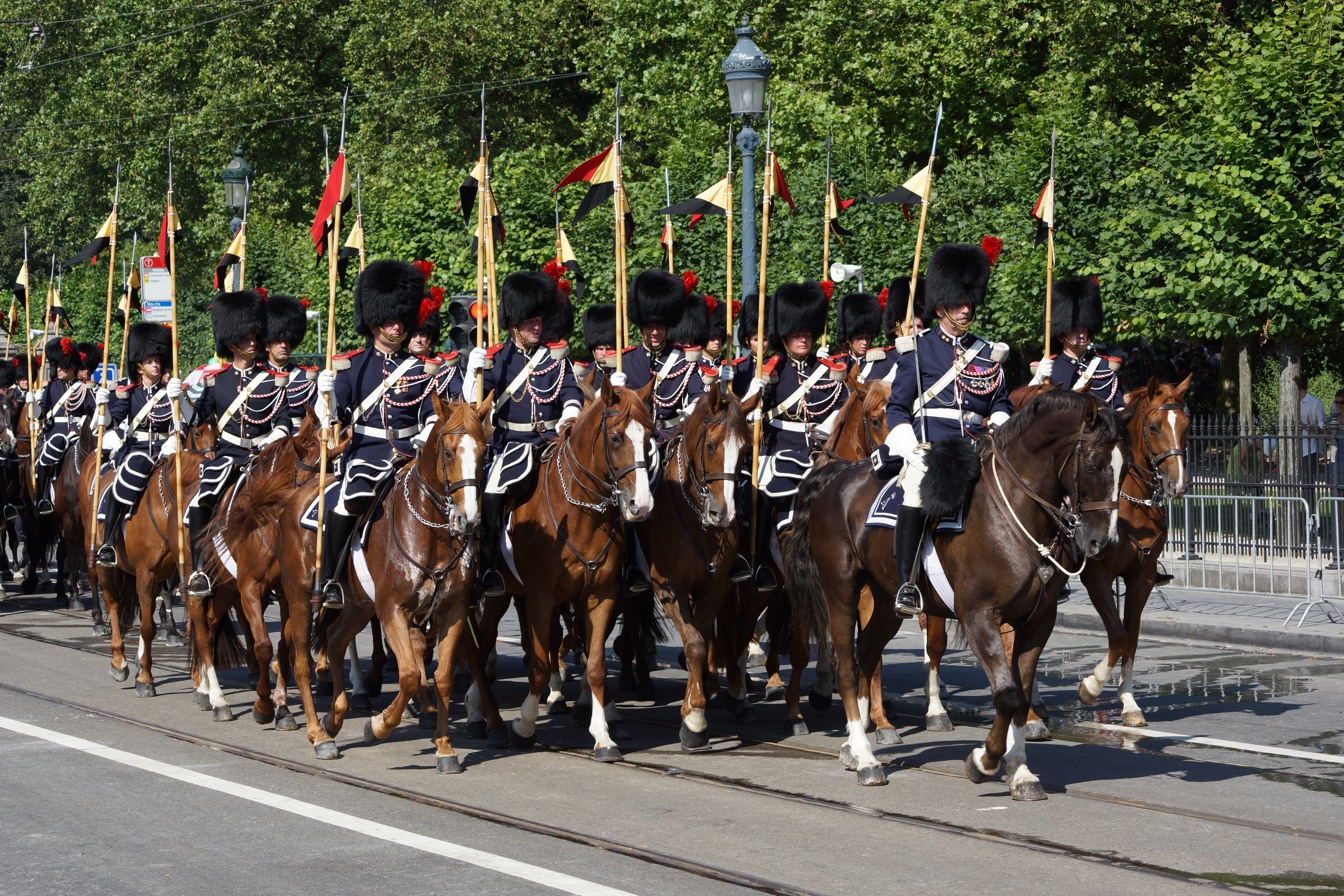
The Belgian Royal Escort during Belgian National Day 2013

The Belgian Royal Escort (Dutch: Koninklijk escorte te paard, French: Escorte royale à cheval) is a horse- and motorcycle-mounted unit that accompanies the Belgian monarch on ceremonial occasions. It also provides escorts for foreign visiting heads of state and ambassadors presenting their credentials at the Royal Palace in Brussels.

== Composition ==
The Royal Escort is not a full-time unit but is brought together on occasions of major ceremony as noted above. It is provided by units of the Federal Police. Prior to the merger of the Gendarmerie and Police, the unit was provided by the Gendarmerie. There are two Royal Escorts: the mounted escort and the motorcycle escort.

== History ==
The Belgian monarchs have been accompanied by a mounted escort on state occasions since Belgium's independence in 1830. Until 1914 these were provided by detachments drawn from either the Marie-Henriette squadron of the Civic Guard of Brussels or from the Guides Regiments of the regular cavalry of the Belgian Army, based in Brussels. After World War I the disbandment of the Civic Guard led to a suggestion that a separate mounted ceremonial unit be established but the proposal was left in abeyance until the Belgian cavalry was mechanized in 1938. Accordingly, in that year a permanent Royal Escort was created as part of the Gendarmerie. The full dress uniform of bearskin, black tunic and white breeches then adopted, and still worn, had been that of the mounted gendarmerie prior to 1914.

== See also ==
- Federal Police (Belgium)
- Policing in Belgium
