= Crime in Belgium =

- Homicide: 1.1 (2021)
- Assault: 567.9 (2023)
- Burglary: 409.8 (2024)
- Theft: 1669.0 (2024)
- Fraud: 1048.9 (2024)
- Corruption: 38.9 (2024)
- Bribery: 0.5 (2024)
- Money laundering: 41.7 (2024)
- Rape: 37.6 (2023)
- Sexual violence: 99.2 (2023)
- reported per 100,000 inhabitants

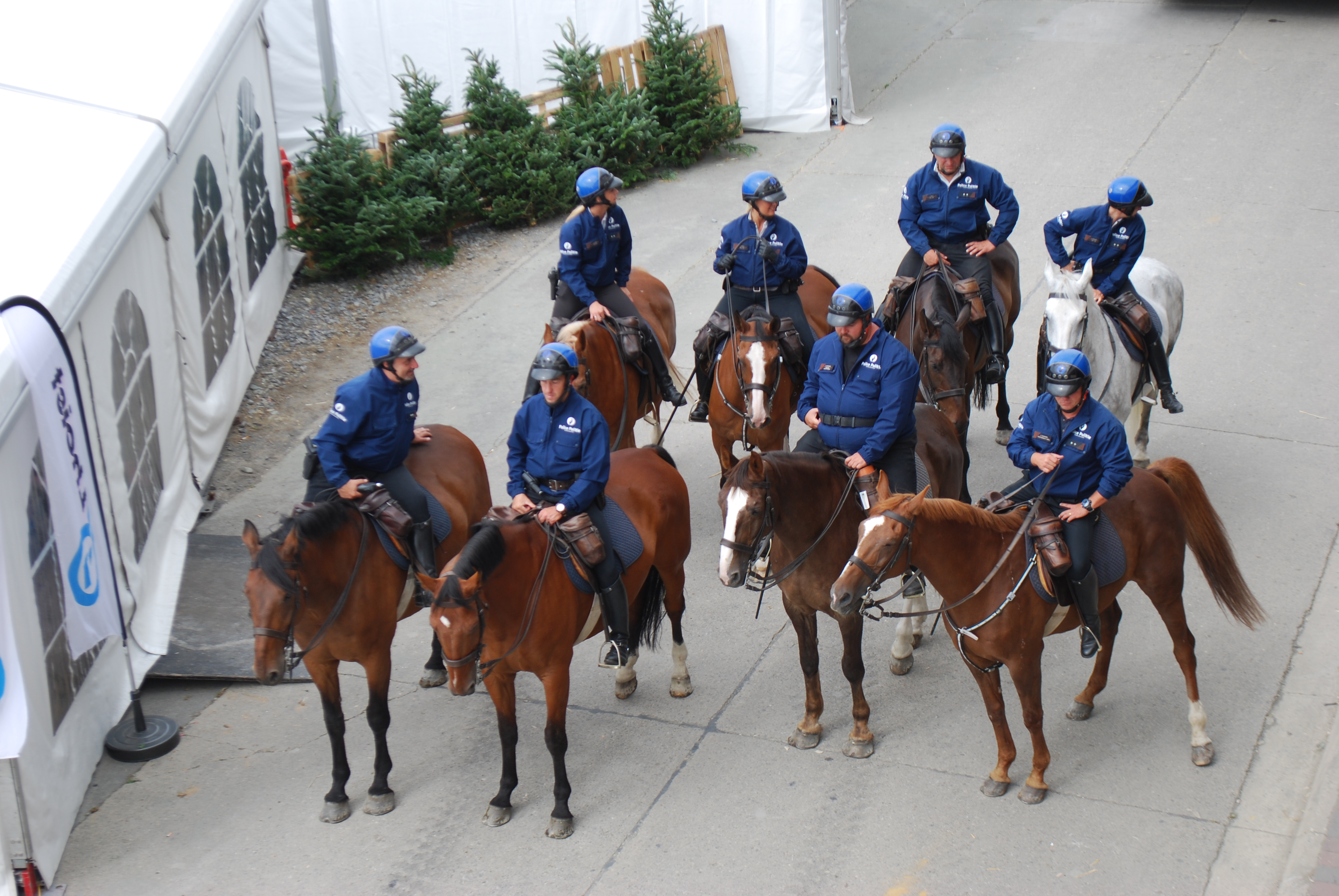
Belgian mounted police

Crime in Belgium is countered by the Belgian Police and other agencies.

== Crime by type ==
=== Murder ===
In 2012, Belgium had a murder rate of 1.8 per 100,000 population. There were a total of 182 murders in Belgium in 2012.

Belgium's drug crisis has fueled murder rates in recent years, and Brussels now has the second highest murder rate in the European Union, and 2025 saw the highest number of shootings in the history of the city, with 96 shootings.

=== Drug trafficking ===
Drug trafficking is a serious problem, with the Port of Antwerp being a significant hub for drug trafficking due to its large cargo volume and antiquated security measures. More drugs flow through Antwerp than any other city in Europe. In 2025, an Antwerp judge anonymously requested support from the government, stating that Belgium had become a "narco-state." Belgian law enforcement has considered deploying the military to secure Brussels. In 2026, the president of the Antwerp court of appeal, Bart Willocx, said: "The amount of money that is involved – to influence people, to corrupt people and to bribe – it is so big that it is really a danger for the stability of our society."

=== Theft ===
Muggings, purse snatchings, and pocket picking occur frequently, particularly in major cities. Thieves often loiter in transportation hubs like the Metro (subway) and train stations to take advantage of disoriented or distracted travelers.

=== Corruption ===
Public trust in the civil service and the judiciary is low, and perception of corruption is high in Belgium.

== Crime dynamics ==
=== Crime and racial tension ===
A study based on data from 1999 concluded that minors of non-European nationality were overrepresented in crime statistics. While 4.4% of the Belgian population has a non-European nationality, 19% of all prosecuted cases, and 24% of cases presented in youth court involved non-European nationals.

=== Terrorism and crime ===
Besides general safety issues in some boroughs, Brussels reportedly serves as a hub for terrorists, as reported by various sources such as Interpol, and local newspapers such as Het Nieuwsblad. In the same boroughs that pose safety problems (e.g. Molenbeek-Saint-Jean, Schaerbeek, ...) there is radicalisation. This remains however very limited in scale, the occurrence of Belgian nationals directly linked to international terrorism hovering around 0.1-1 per million inhabitants for the last decade.

The two Tunisian nationals who assassinated Commander Massoud in Afghanistan had fake Belgian passports, and the Moroccan Islamic Combatant Group (GICM) has links in Belgium too - there were arrests in Brussels and Antwerp of individuals involved in the Madrid bombing. As a result, stringent measures were taken against passport and other official documents forging.

Belgium has also seen hate crimes against visible minorities recently, including the Hans Van Themsche case, the Patrick Mombaerts case or other acts of racist violence.

=== Crime and politics ===
Much reported in newspapers were mayor Philippe Moureaux of Molenbeek's failed attempts at revitalizing the Brussels municipality. In June 2011, the multinational company BBDO, citing over 150 attacks on their staff by locals, posted an open letter to Moureaux, announcing its withdrawal from the municipality. As a result, serious questions were raised about governance, security and the administration of Moureaux. Following a general decrease in crime, the company finally decided to remain in Molenbeek.

This played in a wider context of left-right wing political discord lining up with Belgium's Flemish-Walloons language conflict. The case became emblematic of perceived Walloon socialist plotting to let neighbourhoods degrade (by inviting immigrants and offering them social security) to create socialist-voting poor constituents. The Walloon side thought it showed how Flemish media, mostly controlled by openly nationalist families, push a right-wing and xenophobic agenda.

The labyrinthine political structure of Brussels has been blamed for the high crime rates, with commentators noting that Brussels' decentralized governance structure is a liability to good governance. Brussels politicians are frequently unable to form governments, and Brussels is divided into 19 independent municipalities and six different police regions, complicating law enforcement coordination across the city and allowing criminals to slip through the cracks.

== By location ==
=== Brussels ===
According to Urban Audit, in 2001, Brussels had the fourth highest number of recorded crimes of European capitals (behind Stockholm, Amsterdam, and Berlin, and virtually on a par with Helsinki). According to the same source, Brussels had a rate of 10 murders or violent deaths per 100,000 citizens.

Usually, serious safety issues in Brussels are mostly limited to residential boroughs with a low income population.

=== Other cities ===
Belgium's second largest city, Antwerp, saw crime rates about 20% below those of Brussels. Liège and Charleroi, industrial cities with high unemployment rates, saw more elevated crime rates than the less industrialized cities of Ghent and Bruges. The rural areas are generally safe.

== See also ==
- Albanian mafia in Belgium
- Joe Van Holsbeeck
- Murder of Karel van Noppen
