= Committee P =

External control body for all civil servants of the police services in Belgium

The Committee P (Dutch: Comité P French: Comité P, German: Komitee P), or the Permanent Oversight Committee on the Police Services (Dutch: Vast Comité van Toezicht op de politiediensten, French: Comité permanent de contrôle des services de police), exercises external oversight over the Belgian police and all civil servants with police authority. It is responsible to the Belgian Chamber of Representatives, the lower house of the Belgian Federal Parliament, which appoints and dismisses its members.

== Presidents ==
The president of the Committee P must be a magistrate.

- January 2012 (ad interim since November 2011) Yves Keppens
- 2008-2012 Bart Van Lijsebeth (2008 ad interim), 2009 definitely)
- ? -2008 André Vandoren, who left to become the first director of the new antiterrorist centralized office OCAM (Organe de coordination pour l'analyse de la menace).
