= Law enforcement in Belgium =

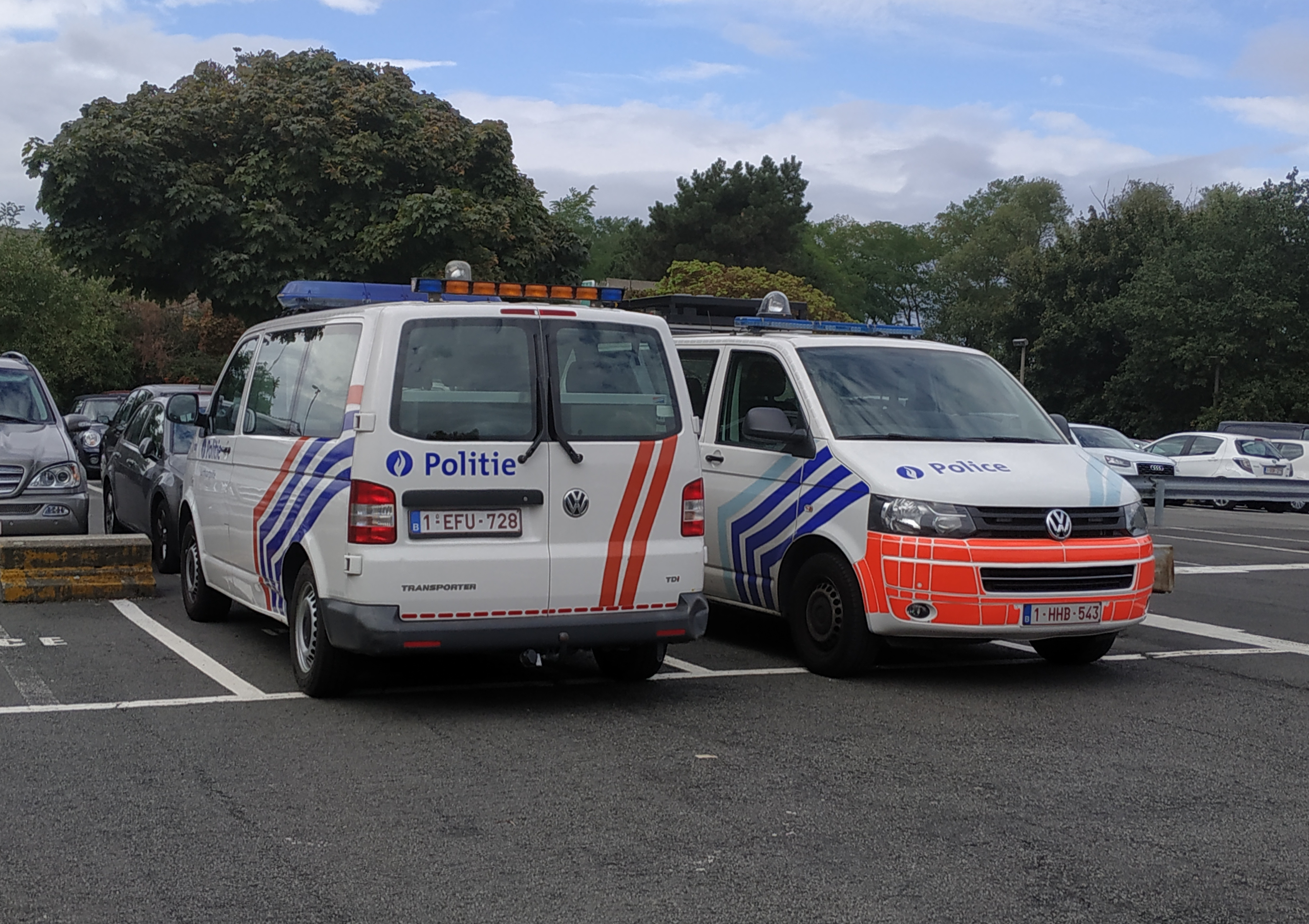
Two vehicles of the Belgian police: Federal on the left (two orange stripes on the rear door and a single one on the side) and local on the right (light blue stripes)

Law enforcement in Belgium is conducted by an integrated police service structured on the federal and local levels, made up of the Federal Police and the Local Police. Both forces are autonomous and subordinate to different authorities, but linked in regard to reciprocal support, recruitment, manpower mobility and common training.

In 2001, the Belgian police underwent a fundamental structural reform that created this completely new police system. A Belgian parliamentary report into a series of pedophile murders accused the police of negligence, amateurism and incompetence in investigating the cases. The loss of public confidence in the police was so great that the whole population deemed the reform indispensable.

The three former police forces, the municipal police, the national law enforcement service (Rijkswacht/Gendarmerie) and the judicial police (assigned to the offices of the public prosecutors) gave way to an integrated police service structured on two levels.

== Federal Police ==
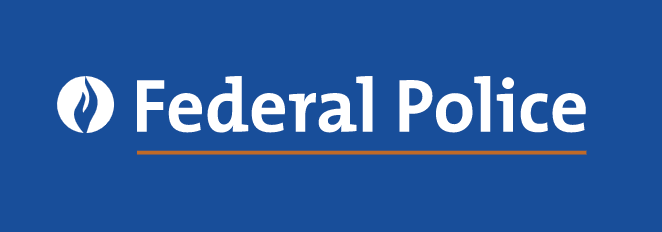
Logo of the Belgian Federal Police (note the orange line)

The federal police (Dutch: Federale Politie; French: Police Fédérale; German: Föderale Polizei) is in charge of both specialized and supralocal law enforcement operations, patrolling and ensuring the safety of the country's highways and is specialized in criminal investigation operations. The force is also tasked with delivering support to the local police forces. The federal police consists of approximately 12,300 personnel members (civilian and operational staff).

The federal police is led by a general commissioner, a senior officer who holds the rank of chief superintendent. The commissioner heads the general commissioner's office. This office is responsible for management, strategy and policy of the federal police; ensuring the functioning of the integrated police (by coordinating with local police forces); coordinating and supporting the federal police units; internal and external communication and international cooperation. It is composed of the:

- directorate of police strategy
- directorate of international police cooperation
- directorate of communication
- directorate of well-being
- 13 decentralized coordination and support directorates (CSD) (spread over the 12 judicial districts)
  - intervention corps (CIK) (spread over the 13 CSD's)

The directorate of international police cooperation (CGI) within this office is Belgium's national central bureau for the European Police Office (Europol), Schengen Information System and International Criminal Police Organization (Interpol).

Falling under the authority of the General Commissioner's Office, are two operational and one non-operational general directorates:

- the general directorate of administrative police (DGA) (Dutch: algemene directie van de bestuurlijke politie; French: direction générale de la police administrative) has two functions: (1) it performs specialized, often supralocal, law enforcement operations and (2) it delivers all kinds of support to the other federal units and the local police forces. The general directorate consists of the following units:
  - directorate of operations of administrative police (DAO)
  - directorate of traffic police (DAH)
  - directorate of railway police (SPC)
  - directorate of maritime and river Police (SPN)
  - directorate of airport police (LPA)
  - directorate of dog support (DACH)
  - directorate of air support (DAFA)
  - directorate of public security (DAS) with the Mounted Police, the water cannon vehicles etc.
  - directorate of protection (DAP) with a.o. detachments in charge of specialised protection of persons and property, protection of the royal family members and the royal palaces or police missions at SHAPE
  - a secretariat.
- the general directorate of judicial police (DGJ) (Dutch: algemene directie van de gerechtelijke politie; French: direction générale de la police judiciaire) investigates heavy, organised and interregional crimes (local crimes are investigated by the local police), as well as conducts proactive and reactive investigation. These investigations involve human and drug trafficking, criminal organisations and groups, murder, armed robbery, fraud, corruption, forgery and missing persons. The general directorate is composed of these directorates:
  - central directorate of operations of judicial police (DJO)
  - central directorate of technical and scientific police (DJT)
  - directorate of special units (DSU)
  - central directorate for combating serious and organised crime (DJSOC)
  - 14 decentralized judicial directorates (FGP) (spread over the 12 judicial districts, acting as the judicial counterpart of the CDSs)
- the general directorate of resource management and information (DGR) (Dutch: algemene directie van het middelenbeheer en de informatie; French: direction générale de la gestion des ressources et de l'information) delivers human resources, financial and general management to the police organization: recruitment, training, staff management, medical, legal affairs, internal affairs, equipment (standards for both Federal and Local Police are the same), logistics, infrastructure, finance etc. It consists of these directorates:
  - directorate of personnel (DRP)
  - directorate of logistics (DRL)
  - directorate of ICT and information (DRI)
  - directorate of finances (DRF)

== Local police ==
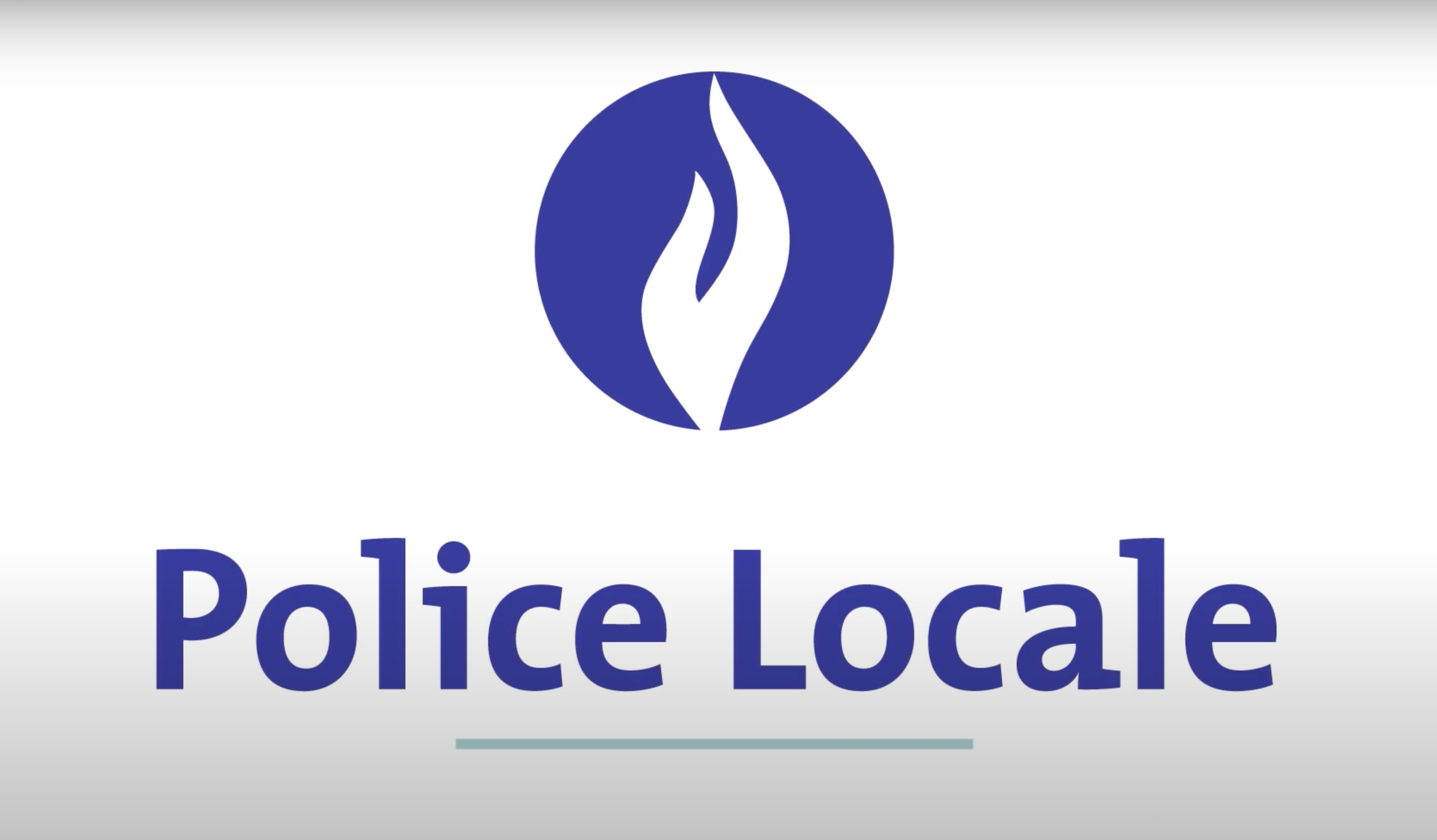
French logo of the Belgian local police forces (note the light-blue line)

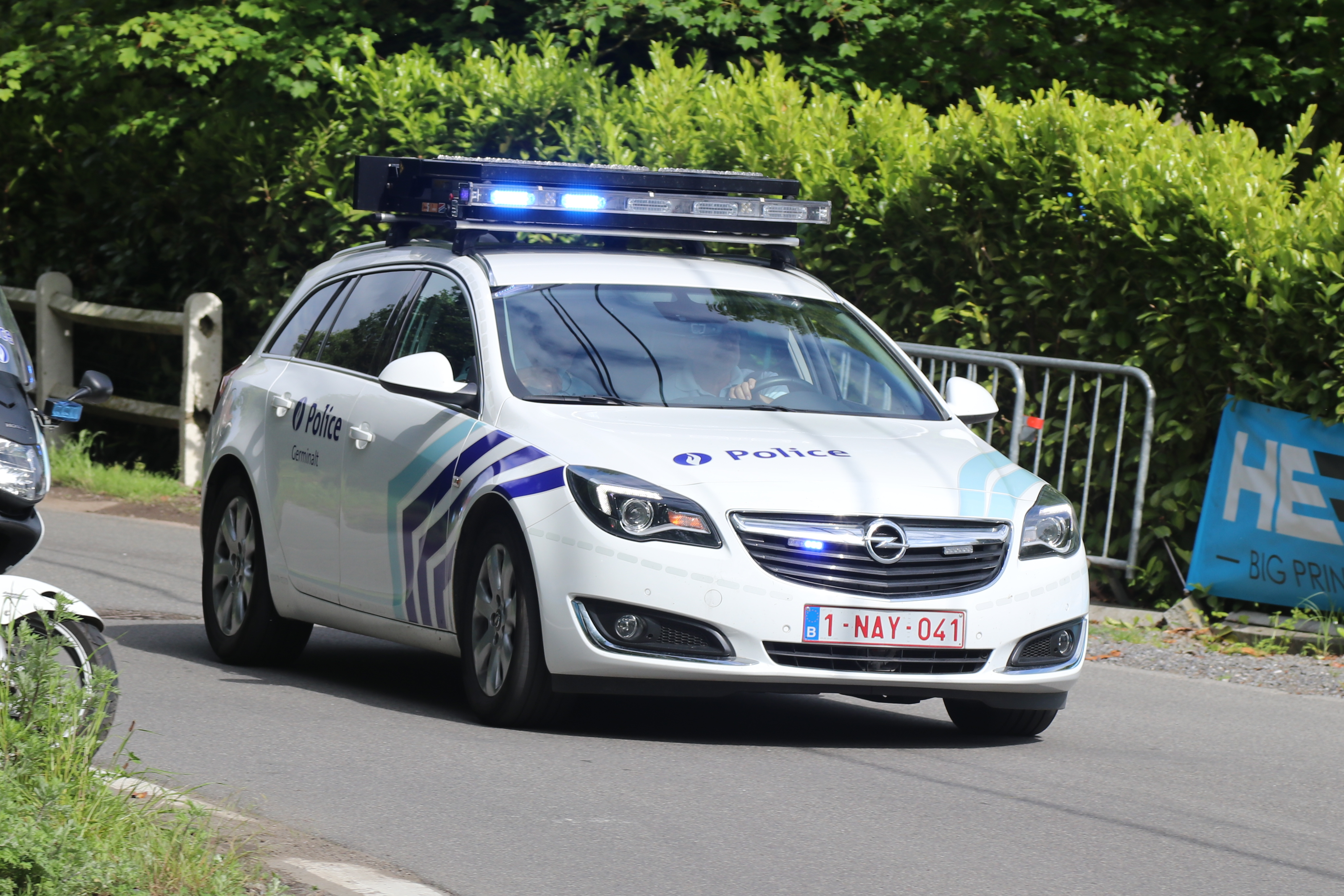
A local police car in Nalinnes

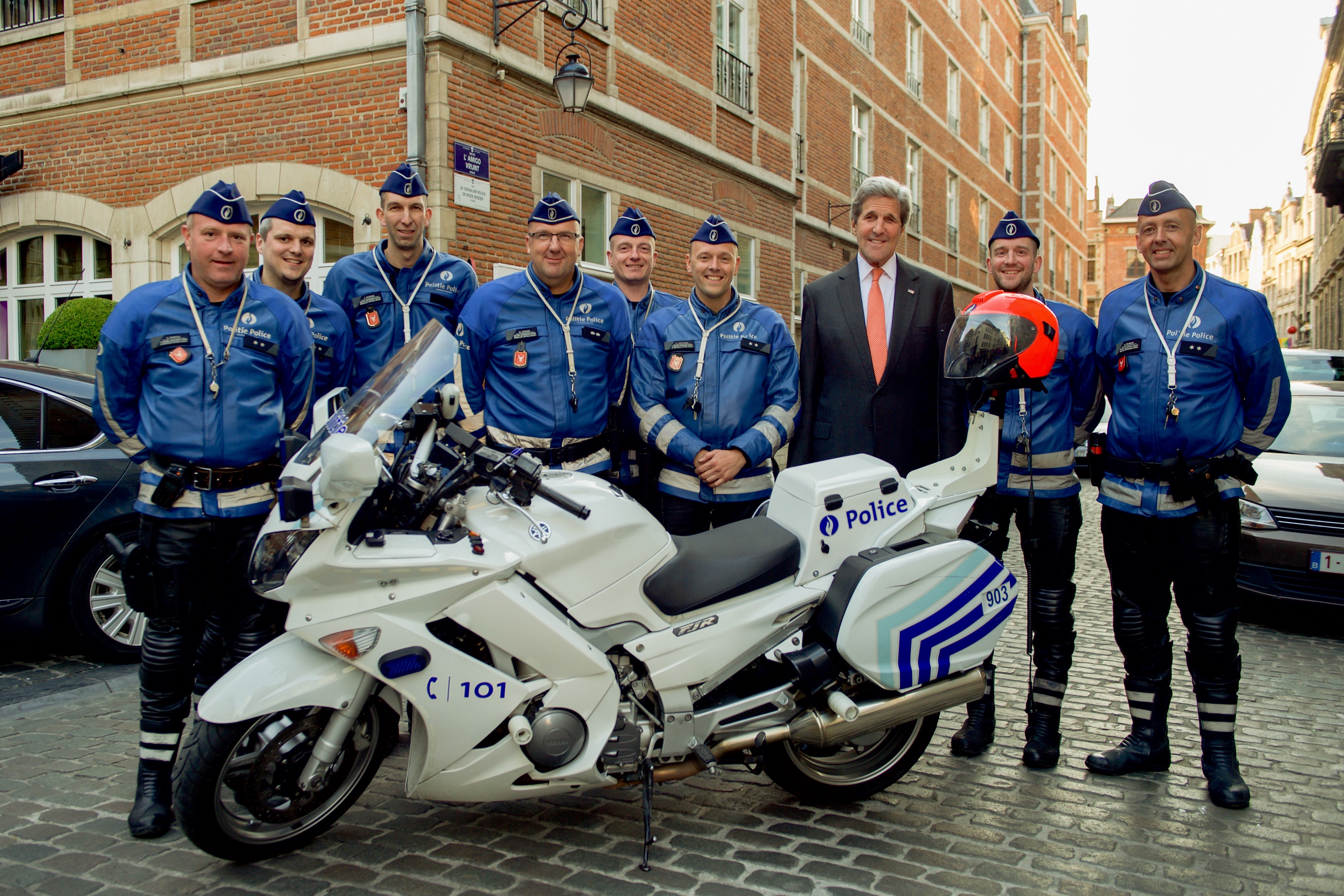
Local police officers (recognisable by the light blue lines on the left side of the uniform, as on the motorcycle) with the former US Secretary of State John Kerry.

The local police (Dutch: Lokale Politie; French: Police Locale; German: Lokale Polizei) is made up of 185 police forces constituted from the former communal and gendarmerie brigades. 50 police forces cover the territory of one municipality (one-city zone) and 146 cover more than one municipality (multi-city zone). The local police can be compared to municipal police forces.

Each local police chief is responsible for the execution of local law enforcement policy and ensures the management, organization and distribution of missions in the local police force. She or he works under the authority of the mayor in one-city zones, or under a police board composed of all the mayors from the different municipalities in a multi-city police zone.

Its philosophy envisions a global and integrated approach to security based on maximum visibility focusing police activities on a limited area, which should optimize contact between the police and the population. It aims to restore public confidence in the police force and of improve the objective and subjective feeling of security in communities.

== Structure ==
Each police force consists of an operational cadre of police and auxiliary police plus civilian personnel for administrative and logistic work. At the moment, approximately 33,000 local police and 900 civilians work in the 188 regional police forces.

The numerical strength of the police is determined by the police board for multi-city zones or by the town council for one-city zones, which must match the minimal standards set by law. Also a Permanent Commission for the Local Police represents all local police services at national level and provides advice on all problems relating to the local police.

== Missions ==
To guarantee a minimum service to the population, Belgian law provides six basic functions for the local police: Community policing, responsiveness, intervention, victim support, local criminal investigation and maintaining public order.

- Community policing consists of developing neighborhood relations and maintaining police visibility. This mission is not merely one of maintaining a physical presence but also of local dialogue, exchange of ideas and personal relationships. The norms call for at least 1 community officer per 4,000 inhabitants.
- Responsiveness means giving answers to citizens who appear in person, call by phone or write to the police. Sometimes they are directed to an internal service or a more suitable external service. Each police zone maintains a permanent point of contact. In the multi-city-zones, each city or municipality has its own police-post which, if not accessible 24 hours a day, gives citizens the opportunity to get in touch with the police.
- The intervention function consists of responding to all calls, where police intervention is needed, within an appropriate time. This response can be, depending on the case and the context (seriousness, necessity, circumstances), immediate or delayed; in this last case, the inquirer must be informed about the cause of the delay and the duration.
- The victims unit gives assistance to victims of crime. Each police officer is expected to give victim support. In serious cases, the police force may use a police officer specially trained to handle victims.
- The local criminal investigation unit supports local police in the investigation of local crime. In each local police force, about 7 to 10 percent of the force's personnel work for the investigations division.
- Maintaining public order means protecting or, when necessary, restoring public order, security and public health. This not only means maintaining public order at large events such as demonstrations, football matches or local festivities but also environmental problems and traffic.

== Police ranks ==
The Federal Police does not have a hierarchical relationship with the local police. Instead, there is a functional connection between the two entities. Both the Federal Police and local police are built up hierarchically, with the same ranks.

The rank insignia are rectangular plates that are worn on the left pocket flap of the uniform shirt, fleece, sweater, jacket, coat and/or bulletproof vest. On the right side pocket flap, a similar plate is worn, displaying the officer's name and a separating line with underneath the name of the force and/or unit the officer belongs to. In some cases (mostly commissioned officers) the function is displayed (e.g. "Commissioner-General"). Both plates have stylized lines on the outer corners depicting the force to which the police operative belongs. The lines are orange/red for the Federal Police; light blue for local police; and silver or gold for personnel of the General Inspection (depending on the rank of the personnel member).

The colour of the rank insignia and the officer's name, function/unit/force depends on the cadre the officer belongs to. Silver insignia and letters are used for all auxiliary, base and middle ranks (up to Chief Inspector), gold is used for all officer ranks.

== Belgium ==
Group	Officer level					Middle-level			Basic-level		
Federal Police	EHCP polfed	CDP polfed	ECP polfed	CP polfed	ACP polfed	EHINP polfed	INPP polfed	AINPP polfed	EINP polfed	INP polfed	AINP polfed
Local police	ECDP polloc	CDP polloc	ECP polloc	CP polloc	ACP polloc	EINPP polloc	INPP polloc	AINPP polloc	EINP polloc	INP polloc	AINP polloc
Title	First chief commissioner Eerste Hoofdcommissaris; Premier commissaire divisionnaire Erste chefkomissar	Chief commissioner Hoofdcommissaris; Commissaire divisionnaire Chefkomissar	First commissioner Eerste commissaris Premier commissaire Erste komissar	Commissioner; Commissaris; Commissaire; Komissar	Candidate commissioner Aspirant-commissaris; Aspirant-commissaire; Aufstrebender komissar	First chief inspector Eerste hoofdinspecteur Premier inspecteur principal Erste chefinspektor	Chief inspector Hoofdinspecteur; Inspecteur principal Chefinspektor	Candidate chief inspector Aspirant-hoofdinspecteur; Aspirant-inspecteur principal Aufstrebender chefinspektor	First inspector Eerste inspecteur Premier inspecteur Erste inspektor	Inspector; Inspecteur; Inspecteur; Inspektor	Candidate inspector Aspirant-inspecteur; Aspirant-inspecteur; Aufstrebender inspektor
Group	Security-level								Auxiliary-level		
Federal Police	1BCSP polfed	BCSP polfed	1BASP polfed	BASP polfed	ABASP polfed	1BAGP polfed	BAGP polfed	ABAGP polfed	EAP polfed	AP polfed	AAP polfed
Local police	N/A								EAP polloc	AP polloc	AAP polloc
Title	First security coordinator Eerste beveiligingscoördinator Premier coordinateur de sécurisation de police Erster Sicherungskoordinator der Polizei	Security coordinator Beveiligingscoördinator; Coordinateur de sécurisation de police Sicherungskoordinator der Polizei	First security assistant Eerste beveiligingsassistent Premier assistant de sécurisation de police Erster Sicherungsassistent der Polizei	Security assistant Beveiligingsassistent; Assistant de sécurisation de police Sicherungsassistent der Polizei	Candidate security assistant Aspirant-beveiligingsassistent; Aspirant assistant de sécurisation de police Sicherungsassistent-Anwärter der Polizei	First security officer Eerste beveiligingsagent Premier agent de sécurisation de police Erster Sicherungsbediensteter der Polizei	Security officer Beveiligingsagent; Agent de sécurisation de police Sicherungsbediensteter der Polizei	Candidate security officer Aspirant-beveiligingsagent; Aspirant agent de sécurisation de police Sicherungsbediensteter-Anwärter der Polizei	First (auxiliary) officer Eerste agent Premier agent Erste agent	(Auxiliary) officer Agent; Agent; Agent	Candidate (auxiliary) officer Aspirant-agent; Aspirant-agent; Aufstrebender agent

=== Rank markings on helmets ===
When performing public order maintenance operations (e.g. demonstrations and riots), police personnel wear a helmet in situations with increased risk of violence. The helmets are white because that colour is easier to spot by cameras and police helicopters. The helmet is plain white for inspectors (rank equivalent to police officer/constable) who function as section members during public order operations. Chief-inspectors (who function as section chiefs) wear white helmets with one blue stripe running from back to front. Commissioners and chief-commissioners (who function as platoon commanders or even squadron commanders and group commanders) have two blue stripes.

=== Trivia ===
Some officers, often belonging to intervention units (patrol units), only wear the rank plate and not the name plate on their uniform whilst on duty. This is to prevent malevolent persons from identifying and subsequently threatening or harassing them as a revenge for being the subject of police operations. This is more common in urban areas than in rural (calmer) areas.

== See also ==
- Committee P
- Police vehicles in Belgium

Historical:

- Rijkswacht

Crime:

- Crime in Belgium
