= Police vehicles in Belgium =

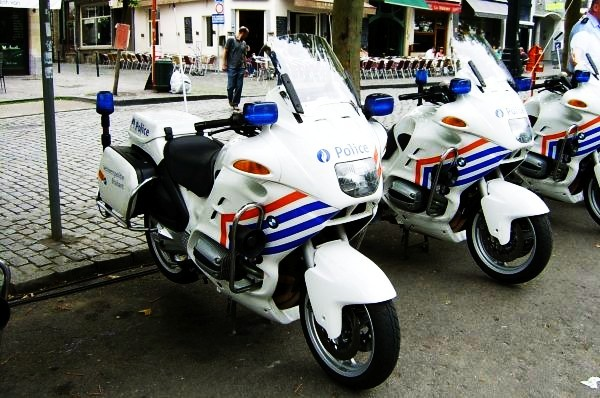
BMW R1100RT motorcycle of the Belgian Federal Police (Motorway Police)

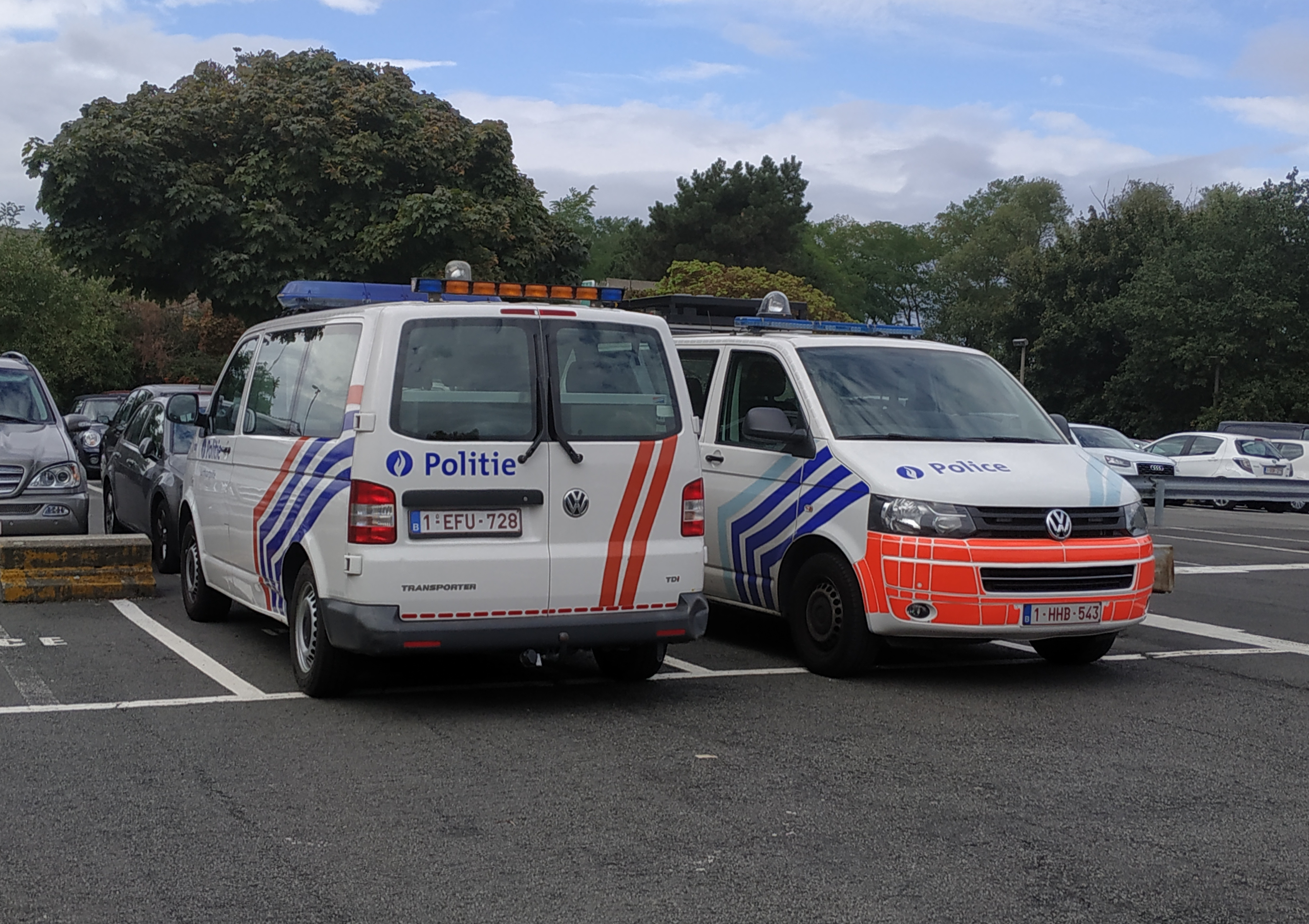
Two vehicles of the Belgian police: Federal on the left (two orange stripes on the rear door and a single one on the side) and local on the right (light blue stripes)

Before 2001, there were several police forces in Belgium:

- The State Police (Dutch: Rijkswacht; French: Gendarmerie)
- The Municipal Police (Dutch: Gemeentepolitie; French: Police communale)
- The Judicial Police (Dutch: Gerechtelijke Politie; French: Police Judiciaire).

After the reform of 2001, there are only two police forces:

- The Federal Police (Dutch: Federale Politie; French: Police fédérale)
- The Local Police (Dutch: Lokale Politie; French: Police Locale)

== Gendarmerie/Rijkswacht ==
The Rijkswacht or Gendarmerie used dark blue vehicles in the past. The force changed to another vehicle look in the 1970s, to make their cars more visible:

- white paint-job
- striping: lengthwise (fluorescent) red stripe.
- side striping (since the early 1990s): one blue and one red line, logo & "Rijkswacht" or "Gendarmerie", SOS *number

Some of the most commonly used vehicles:

- VW Transporter (used for intervention)
- Toyota Corolla (used for administrative work)
- Citroën AX (also used for administrative work)
- VW Golf GTI (used for intervention)
- Opel Astra (intervention)
- Opel Astra Break (K9)
- Peugeot 306 break (K9)

The patrol minivans were always equipped with Federal Smart Vector lightbars, while the smaller vehicles had basic rotating beacons on their roof. The Gendarmerie/Rijkswacht did use the same type of cars all over the country.

== Police Communale/Gemeentelijke Politie ==
The Municipal Police initially used dark blue vehicles and changed, probably at the same time as the Rijkswacht/Gendarmerie, their vehicle exterior:

- white paint-job,
- blue lengthwise stripe
- logo on the side (with the words "police" or "politie" and the city or village name).

The Municipal Police have never had a standard police car, in fact many different vehicles have been used:

- Ford Transit
- VW Transporter
- Opel Vectra and Opel Astra,
- Ford Mondeo

The Belgian government reformed all the Belgian police forces into one police force, structured on two levels (Local Police and Federal Police, both equal to each other), in 2001.

== Local Police/Lokale Politie/Police Locale ==
The consequence of the reformation was the usage of all new striping. The exterior of Local Police vehicles:

- white paint-job
- front- and rear-striping: two light blue lines on the right side of the bonnet and the boot
- side-striping: three dark blue lines and one light blue line, covering the rear end on the left and the front end on the right
- contour markings on every side of the vehicle
- "Police or Politie or Polizei" and the integrated police logo on each side of the vehicle
- mentioning the name of the police zone (police district in which the local force operates)

Belgian Local Police forces use different sorts of police cars. Each zone can choose whether they buy vehicles via the Federal Police or lease/buy vehicles on their own, this leads to a big variety of cars in the fleet (small vehicles, 4x4s, mini-vans, pick-ups, saloons).

== Federal Police/Federale Politie/Police Fédérale ==
The exterior of Federal Police vehicles:

- white paint-job
- front- and rear-striping: two orange lines on the right side of the bonnet and the boot
- side-striping: three dark blue lines and one orange line, covering the rear-end on the left and the front-end on the right
- contour markings on every side of the vehicle
- "Police and/or Politie", "Polizei" for German speaking area the integrated police logo on each side of the vehicle
- mentioning the name of the division (General Reserve, Water-way Police, Air Police, Road Police, Judicial Police).

The Federal Police is somewhat more structured in terms of police vehicles, compared to the Local Police.

Typical vehicles of the Motor-way Police:

- Volvo S60 and V70 (recently, these cars have been equipped with fluorescent red bumpers to improve the visibility on roads)
- Audi A4 quattro (replaces the Volvo S60)
- Opel Astra
- Peugeot 807
- BMW X5 (only Liege and Luxembourg)
- Yamaha motorcycles
- BMW motorcycles

The General Reserve (support, riots) has more specialised vehicles such as:

- Ziegler wave 9000 water-cannons
- Mercedes Sprinters (staff or prisoner transport vehicles, which replace the Iveco 4x4),
- Audi A8 (used for high-risk security assignments)
- Toyota Land Cruiser 100 (used for escorting currency).
- Carriers Shorland 600 (Armoured Personnel Carrier for high-risk order maintenance)

The Water-way Police:

- Rigid-Hulled Inflatable Boat or RHIB (for interception, investigations concerning drugs, smuggling and safety)
- Patrol boat (for in-land water-ways)

The Air Support uses:

- McDonnell Douglas Explorer 900 (NOTAR, no tail rotor) (Special Units transport, air support and interception)
- McDonnell Douglas 520 (NOTAR)
- Cessna 182 (for traffic control, securing high risk transports, environmental control)

Other vehicles used:

- Citroën C3 (general reserve, water-way police, air police, rail-way police)
- Fiat Ducato (almost all federal departments)
- Volkswagen Transporter (almost all federal departments)
- Nissan Patrol (water-way, air and rail-way police)
- Peugeot 807 (motor-way police and dog-support service)
- Peugeot 307 (small number of federal departments)
- Seat Cordoba (small number of federal departments)
- Vauxhall Zafira (recruitment service)

== Car types ==
There are different types of cars used by the Police in Belgium:

- Passenger vehicles: used for patrol, interception and basic police tasks (Ford Mondeo, Vauxhall Astra, VW Passat)
- Combinations: this name is given by Belgians to Police mini-vans, like the Volkswagen Transporter. Belgium has a rich tradition of using "combinations" in great number throughout the police forces (it gained most of its fame and reputation by the Belgian Rijkswacht). They are used for patrol, rapid interventions, basic police tasks, transport of personnel and material and control actions (alcohol control) (Ford Transit, VW T5)
- Mono-volumes and 4x4: used for patrol, basic police tasks, traffic and sometimes for field-command (Ford Galaxy, VW Sharan)
- Smaller passenger vehicles: used by community police, also for administrative work (Ford Fiesta, VW Polo, Opel Corsa)
- Lorries, mini-buses and (4x4) vans: used for field-command, staff transport, prisoner transport, animal transport (Mercedes Sprinter, Iveco 4x4)

== Sirens and lights ==
Belgium has no specific regulations concerning sirens and lights on police vehicles, although the law does not allow the use of red lights pointing forwards, therefore all emergency vehicles may only be equipped with blue lights (red lights are allowed on the rear side).

Each police zone or division chooses by itself which type and brand of lights and sirens will be used, although most forces stick to the popular Federal Signal equipment.

Commonly used light-bars:

- Federal Signal - Valour
- Federal Signal - Arjent SL
- Federal Signal - Smart Vector & LED Vector
- Federal Signal - Vista & Vista SL (deprecated)
- Code 3 - Code 360 (deprecated)

== Communication ==
In the 1980s, the lack of a good working and efficient communication systems came very clear when a couple of incidents happened in Belgium (Heizeldrama, for example). Not long after these disasters, a committee was established. Their task was to find a better communication system. Now, since the reformation of the police, more and more police departments switch over to the new communication system called ASTRID (comparable to TETRA). This new technology allows officers to communicate and work in a much better way than in the past, because of the improved voice quality (digital), multiple functions of the system, ability to use MDTs. All police vehicles are now equipped with ASTRID.
