= André Moyen =

Belgian teacher, journalist and intelligence agent

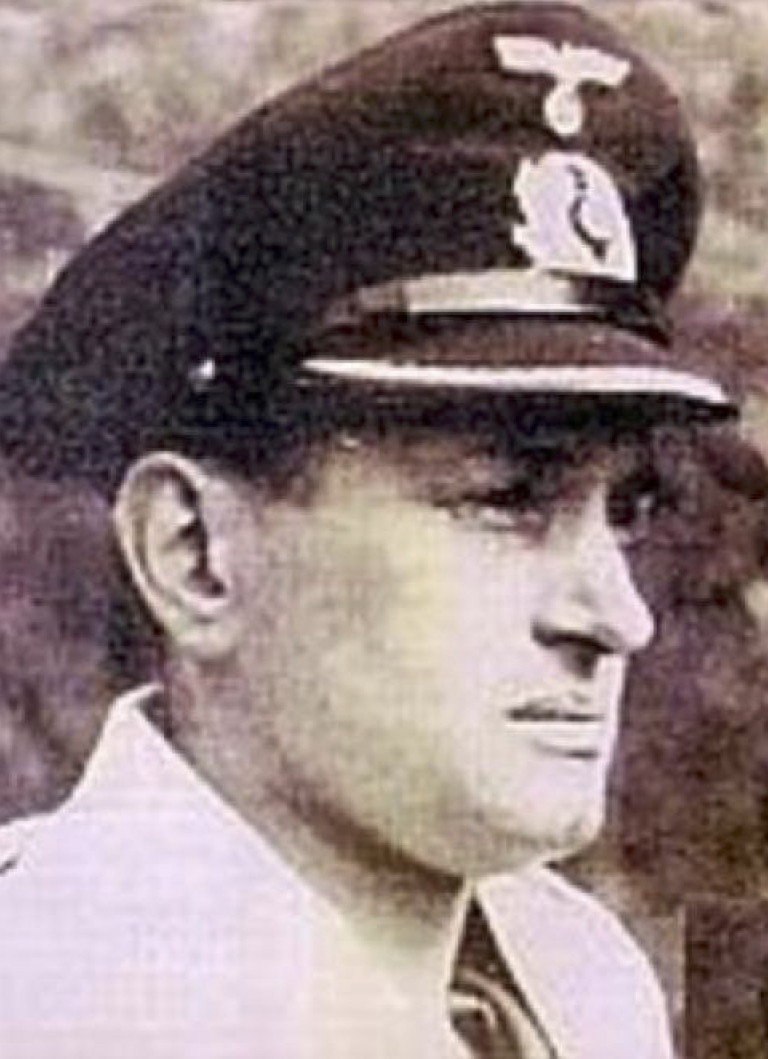
- Moyen in 1940
- Nicknames: Capitaine Freddy; Le Crocodile; Cincinnatus; André de Saint-Michel; Freddy Bastogne
- Born: 29 September 1914; Resteigne, Tellin, Belgium
- Died: February 7, 2008 (aged 93) Ciney, Namur, Belgium
- Allegiance: Belgium
- Branch: Belgian Resistance; Belgian General Information and Security Service; Office of the Coordinator of Information; Office of Strategic Services
- Conflicts: World War II; Cold War

André Michel Moyen was a Belgian teacher, journalist, and intelligence agent. In World War II, Moyen was a member of the Belgian Resistance, and during the Cold War, he founded the Belgian Anticommunist Bloc (BACB). He was a member of the Belgian General Information and Security Service (GISS). During the war, Andre also coordinated activities in Belgium for the Office of Strategic Services, and his OSS contact Robert Solberg. Throughout his life, he groomed hundreds of intelligence agents in Belgium, Africa and Asia where he served as intelligence advisor to several governments. Historians have linked Moyen's "stay-behind network" to high-profile anti-communist actions and attacks during the Cold War, most notably the 1950 murder of Julien Lahaut.

== Early career as scholar and spy ==
Moyen studied to be a regent at the Saint-Joseph normal school in Carlsbourg. In 1934, he completed his military service with the "Ardennes hunters" in Arlon and Bastogne. From 1935 to 1942 he was a teacher at the Collège Cardinal Mercier in Braine-l'Alleud.

Concurrently, in 1935 he came into contact with the GISS and became a freelance employee. He remained connected to the secret service until 1965. Also in 1935, under the guise of being a medical student at a German university, he went to spy on the Siegfried Line.

In Nazi Germany, his mentor as a secret agent was Colonel Rene Mampuys, who was the head of the Belgian army's intelligence service.

== World War II ==
In 1940 Moyen was a soldier and took part in the fight against the German invasion of Belgium.

Moyen created the group known in english as Service Eight, which liquidated Gestapo agents.

When the Germans officially occupied Belgium, he, together with his comrade Fernand Canoot, founded a resistance group in the Ardennes under the name 'Athos'. Under the aliases Capitaine Freddy, Le Crocodile, Cincinnatus and André de Saint-Michel, he carried out risky infiltration missions. This group raided the German telecommunications centre in Bouillon, Belgium.

The Athos group organized a false "special police" which, without the Germans knowing, carried out operations to gather intelligence or to punish collaborators. Athos was part, but with a large degree of autonomy, of the much larger group that became known as "Zéro". In 1944 he joined the Allied army.

== Cold War ==
After World War II, he was recruited by the Belgian military intelligence service. He became one of the most important Belgian counterspies and carried out missions in Congo, Morocco, Egypt, Taiwan, Vietnam and Korea. In Morocco, he helped King Hassan II set up his germandarie. In China, he was an advisor to the Chief of Pang Chiih, the Chinese Nationalist spy service.

=== Bureau Milpol ===
He set up his own intelligence service, under the name Bureau Milpol, or just Milpol, and published an information leaflet, which reached ministers and civil servants, among others. Bureau Milpol carried out financial intelligence missions in Belgium and had a network in the Belgian Congo.

=== Belgian Anticommunist Bloc ===
He also organized a network, under the name of Belgisch Anticommunistisch Blok (Belgian Anticommunist Bloc). Among its members were inspectors of the judicial police of Liège, Antwerp and Brussels. In his activities he did not shy away from burglaries, thefts and acts of violence. In Belgium he was involved in the establishment of Operation Gladio, and the Gladio groups - secret agents who formed the stay-behind network.

The Belgian stay-behind network was officially managed by the Service General de Renseignement/Service de Documentation, de Recherce et d'Action (SGR/SDRA). Moyen was appointed Deputy Director of SGR/SDRA. Moyen worked here from 1938 to 1952. The clandestine intelligence group around Moyen had direct ties to the official police services. It was furthermore supported by prominent corporations and financial institutions including the Société Générale, the Union Minière and Brufina. Moyen's network was allowed to set up its headquarters free of charge in a building owned by the Union Minière in the Komediantenstraat in the center of Brussels, and intelligence reports by Moyen were shared both with the official military intelligence services and with the companies that supported him.

=== Journalism career ===
After 1945 he was a regular contributor or correspondent in Brussels for Europe-Amérique, Le Phare, L'Occident, Septembre, Vrai, La Météo Économique, Industrie (Fédération des Industries Belges), and also for Der Spiegel (Hamburg), Gazet van Antwerpen (Antwerp), Dzinnik Polski (London) and Europeo de Roma (Rome).

=== The CIA finds Moyen's information suspicious ===
The CIA wrote in a 1952 intelligence report on Paper Mills that Moyen's intense hatred of communism led to a kind of intelligence that was not discriminatory (meaning that Moyen did not filter information collected before passing it on to analysts), and was suspicious in its veracity.

The CIA wrote:

"MOYEN's very sensational "information' on Soviet activities consists largely of exhumed espionage stories of the war period... Any topic which presents possibilities of sensationalism or scandal inspires MOYEN, and he is known to write inaccurate and derogatory reports even on his supposed friends, including the American and Belgian intelligence services, as well as on his enemies, the Communists... Supposedly secret reports by MOYEN - for instance, reports on the parachuting of arms by the Soviets into Belgium in the summer of 1948 and on Soviet espionage and sabotage in the Congo - have been proven by OSO to be wholly false... The French, Belgian, Swiss and Dutch intelligence services continue to receive MOYEN's product but, except for the Swiss Air Intelligence Service, apparently give it the low evaluation that MOYEN's reputation for unreliability merits... He claims, in addition, to have a private network of agents established in the Belgian Congo, operating independently of the Belgian Surete de l'Etat, and has implied that his activities are supported by the Union Miniere du Haut Katanga. Whatever actual sources MOYEN may have, however, they appear incapable of providing items of intelligence value."

== The murder of Julien Lahaut ==
Moyen belonged to the strongly anti-communist and Leopoldist trend within the secret services. There are strong indications that he was one of the clients for the murder of the communist MP Julien Lahaut. The Antwerp police commissioner Alfred Van der Linden in particular got his teeth into the case in 1961. The commissioner pointed Liège to the suspected linchpin, André Moyen. The archives of the State Security Service (VSSE) provided evidence that Moyen founded the BACB and that the insurance agent François Goossens from Halle was a member. In 2007, an episode of the television programme Keerpunt on the chain Canvas featured Eugeen Devillé, an elderly man from Halle, who stated that he had personally partaken in the murder of Lahaut alongside his brother Alex, their brother-in-law Jan Hamelrijck, and Goossens.

Due to sloppy filing, the evidence of Goossens' BACB membership did not end up in his personal file and the information was not sent to Liège in September 1950. Incidentally, the VSSE filed a complaint against Moyen in the spring of 1950. However, Attorney General Camille Pholien – brother of Prime Minister Joseph Pholien – considered this "not opportune". After a statute of limitations, which was 20 years at the time, the council chamber decided in 1972 to end the case with a decision not to prosecute.

Goossens was tracked and anonymously implied in a 1985 research work by Etienne Verhoeyen and Rudi Van Doorslaer of the CegeSoma. In 2002, senator Vincent Van Quickenborne publicly revealed the true identity of Goossens. Subsequently, in 2015, another team of historians at the CegeSoma (led by Emmanuel Gerard) linked the murder to anti-communist and royalist elements inside the General Information and Security Service. They pointed to Moyen as a key figure, while agreeing that Goossens was one of the direct perpetrators. The historians discovered a secret report that Moyen wrote to a former interior minister and other associates about the murder. In it, Moyen defends the "execution" of Lahaut as a "necessary measure" because the Belgian government was supposedly not taking sufficient action against the perceived fifth column which the communists constituted. The researchers state that Moyen was implementing a strategy of tension as he hoped that violence and instability would lead to the creation of an authoritarian right-wing regime. However, Moyen had already died in 2008 and no one was ever put on trial for the murder.

== Belgian Congo ==
André Moyen's network was sponsored by the top of Belgian big business. The Société Générale de Belgique was directly involved. The holding company was also almost a state within a state and controlled a large part of the Belgian economy at the time. Even in Belgian Congo, where the uranium mines in the hands of the Union Minière had a major strategic importance for the American production of nuclear weapons. They were therefore not allowed to fall into the hands of nationalist movements in Congo (Patrice Lumumba) or a left-wing democratic regime in Belgium. Researchers revealed that the Belgian Anticommunist Bloc (BACB) received financial support from the holding company Brufina, the financial arm of the Bank of Brussels (now ING). At that time, the Société Génerale and its Congolese branch Union Minière also supported the BACB, which remained housed in the aforementioned Union Minière building in the Komediantenstraat. The house later became the headquarters of Umicore, the new name for Union Minière.

André Moyen founded the Crocodile network in Congo. In return for financial support, their companies received lists of names of communists in their company and of Congolese of 'dubious character'. In this perspective, his name was already mentioned in connection with the murder of Patrice Lumumba.

== Other activities and later life ==
From 1965 to 1980 he was director for Belgium of the G4S. He was also owner of the Daverdisse-based Agence d'informations économiques.

He kept in touch with the secret services and came out with his own opinions on all sorts of files, including the Brabant killers. He remained an enemy of the communists, whom he suspected were at work everywhere. He did not hesitate to do his own investigations and to suspect or accuse certain gendarmes or journalists of all sorts of misdeeds.

From 1983 until his death in 2008, he officially worked as "training and security consultant" in Schaerbeek. In his nineties, he still had to write several research and expertise reports to gain a sufficient income. He moved around in far-right circles and became acquainted with Baron Benoît de Bonvoisin, whose family archive he was asked to help organize.

== Publications ==
Moyen published multiple books:

- Service 8, l'espionnage et la résistance belge sous l'occupation allemande (as Freddy X), Éd. du Monde de Demain, Brussels, 1945.
- Ils ont craché sur nos tombes : l'espionnage et la résistance belges sous l'occupation et dans la guerre jusqu'à la capitulation allemande (as Capitaine Freddy), Éd. Fasbender, Arlon, 1947.
- La Réforme agraire dans les pays en voie de développement, Éd. Infor, Brussels, 1954.
- L'assassinat d'Alexandre Galopin, Gouverneur de la Société Générale de Belgique, le 28 Février 1944, remains unpublished.

== Books about subject ==
- Rudi VAN DOORSLAER & Etienne VERHOEYEN, The murder of Lahaut. Communism as a domestic enemy, Leuven, Kritak, 1985.
- Emmanuel GERARD (ed.), Widukind DE RIDDER & Françoise MULLER, Who Killed Lahaut? The Cold War in Belgium, Leuven, Davidsfonds, 2015.
- Investigation into the murder of Julien Lahaut was doomed, in: Knack, 12 May 2015.
- Roger COEKELBERGS et al., Memorial Book of Intelligence and Action Agents, Antwerp/Apeldoorn, Maklu, 2015.
- Françoise MULLER, "Cette vie si pure du combattant de la guerre secrète" : the anti-communist network of André Moyen, UCL, 2016.
- Etienne VERHOEYEN, André Moyen, in: Nouvelle biographie nationale, T. 14, Brussels, 2018.
