= Julien Lahaut =

Belgian politician (1884–1950)

Chairman of the Communist Party of Belgium
- In office 11 August 1945 – 18 August 1950

Personal details
- Born: 6 September 1884 Seraing, Belgium
- Died: 18 August 1950 (aged 65) Seraing, Belgium
- Cause of death: Assassination
- Party: Communist Party of Belgium
- Occupation: Politician, trade unionist

Military service
- Allegiance: Belgium
- Branch/service: Belgian Army
- Years of service: 1915–1918
- Unit: Belgian Expeditionary Corps
- Battles/wars: World War One; Eastern Front; Brusilov Offensive; Kerensky Offensive

Julien-Victor Lahaut (6 September 1884 – 18 August 1950) was a Belgian politician and trade unionist who served as chairman of the Communist Party of Belgium from 1945 to 1950. An important figure during the German occupation of 1940–44, he became a vocal advocate for the abolition of the Belgian monarchy during the post-war Royal Question. His assassination in August 1950, at the height of the crisis, was linked to anti-communist and royalist elements inside the Belgian intelligence services by a team of historians in 2015; however, the murder remains officially unsolved.

== Biography ==
Lahaut was born into a working-class family in Seraing, and took up work as a boilermaker at age fourteen. At eighteen years old, he participated in a strike in support of universal suffrage, for which he was dismissed; after finding employment again in 1908, Lahaut became secretary of a metalworkers' union, and also joined the Belgian Labour Party.

During the First World War, Lahaut volunteered to serve in the Belgian army and was part of the Belgian Expeditionary Corps in Russia, fighting on the Eastern Front along with Imperial Russian forces. He returned to Belgium in 1919. In March 1921, Lahaut led a strike at Ougrée-Marihaye which lasted throughout the year; he was arrested after seven months, after which the strike was ended by the Union of Belgian Metalworkers.

After his release, Lahaut sought to resume the strike, which brought him into conflict with the union leadership and caused the formation of a new metalworkers' union, the Chevaliers du Travail ("Knights of Labour"), led by Lahaut. This ultimately lead to his exclusion from the Belgian Labour Party, after which he joined the Communist Party of Belgium in 1923. Although elected to the political bureau of the party, Lahaut remained focused on unionist activities. He was one of the leaders of the Belgian general strike of 1932, which led to his arrest. Released after the charges against him were dropped, the strike contributed to a surge in popularity for the Communist Party, and Lahaut was elected a deputy for Liège in the 1932 general election.

Lahaut was part of the three-member secretariat which lead the Communist Party following the death of general secretary Joseph Jacquemotte in 1936. In his roles as deputy and co-leader of the party, he became one of the principal leaders of the struggle against fascism and rexism in his home country. He also headed the aid campaign for the Republican faction during the Spanish Civil War, which included political support and material as well as military aid, with the recruitment of Belgians for the International Brigades.

=== German occupation of Belgium ===
By the start of the German occupation of Belgium in May 1940 the Communist Party was already operating semi-clandestinely, after the adoption of a law "on the defense of national institutions" earlier that spring. An arrest warrant for Lahaut was issued shortly after the start of the occupation; he managed to escape arrest as he relocated to the south of France for some time, organizing support for anti-fascist refugees there.

After returning to Belgium, Lahaut organized the Strike of the 100,000. The strike began at the Cockerill steelworks in Lahaut's home town of Seraing on 10 May 1941, the one-year anniversary of the German occupation, and quickly spread to nearby provinces. Lahaut was arrested by the Germans following the strike and imprisoned in the Citadel of Huy. After a number of escape attempts, he was deported to Neuengamme concentration camp in September 1941. Despite his ill health Lahaut organized resistance activities among the prisoners, including acts of sabotage after they were forced to work in war production in 1942. In July 1944 Lahaut was sentenced to death and sent to Mauthausen concentration camp; though suffering from edema, he survived until the liberation of the camp in May 1945.

At his return to Belgium, Lahaut was celebrated as a resistance hero. Sixty years old and weakened following the years of imprisonment in the camps, he was however unable to resume the central role he had held within the Communist Party prior to the war. On 11 August 1945, the largely ceremonial position of chairman (président) of the party was created and taken by Lahaut.

== Royal Question and assassination ==
The aftermath of the Liberation of Belgium saw a prolonged period of political crisis, known as the Royal Question, over whether King Leopold III, who was living in exile due to his decision to surrender to Nazi Germany in 1940, could return to his position as monarch. The crisis came to a head in 1950, when Leopold returned to Belgium, but quickly had to let his son Baudouin assume royal duties. (He would abdicate in Baudouin’s favour a year later.)

On 11 August 1950, Baudouin took the constitutional oath as regent before a joint session of both chambers of Parliament. During the proceedings, one of the communist deputies present shouted “Vive la république !” (“Long Live the republic!”). Lahaut was reported to have been the deputy responsible, though in the confusion of the moment this remains unconfirmed. A week later, on 18 August 1950, Lahaut was assassinated by two unknown gunmen outside his home in Seraing.

Coming at the end of the constitutional crisis, Lahaut's death caused widespread outrage, especially in left-wing circles. Strikes were organized all over the country, while 300,000 people attended his funeral. The Communist Party newspaper Le Drapeau rouge carried the headline: “A monstrous crime! Our dear comrade Julien Lahaut, leader of the Communist Party, was assassinated last night by the Leo-Rexists". (Note: "Leo-Rexists" is a hybrid of "Leopoldist" (supporter of Leopold III) and "rexist" (member of the pro-Nazi Rexist Party during World War II))

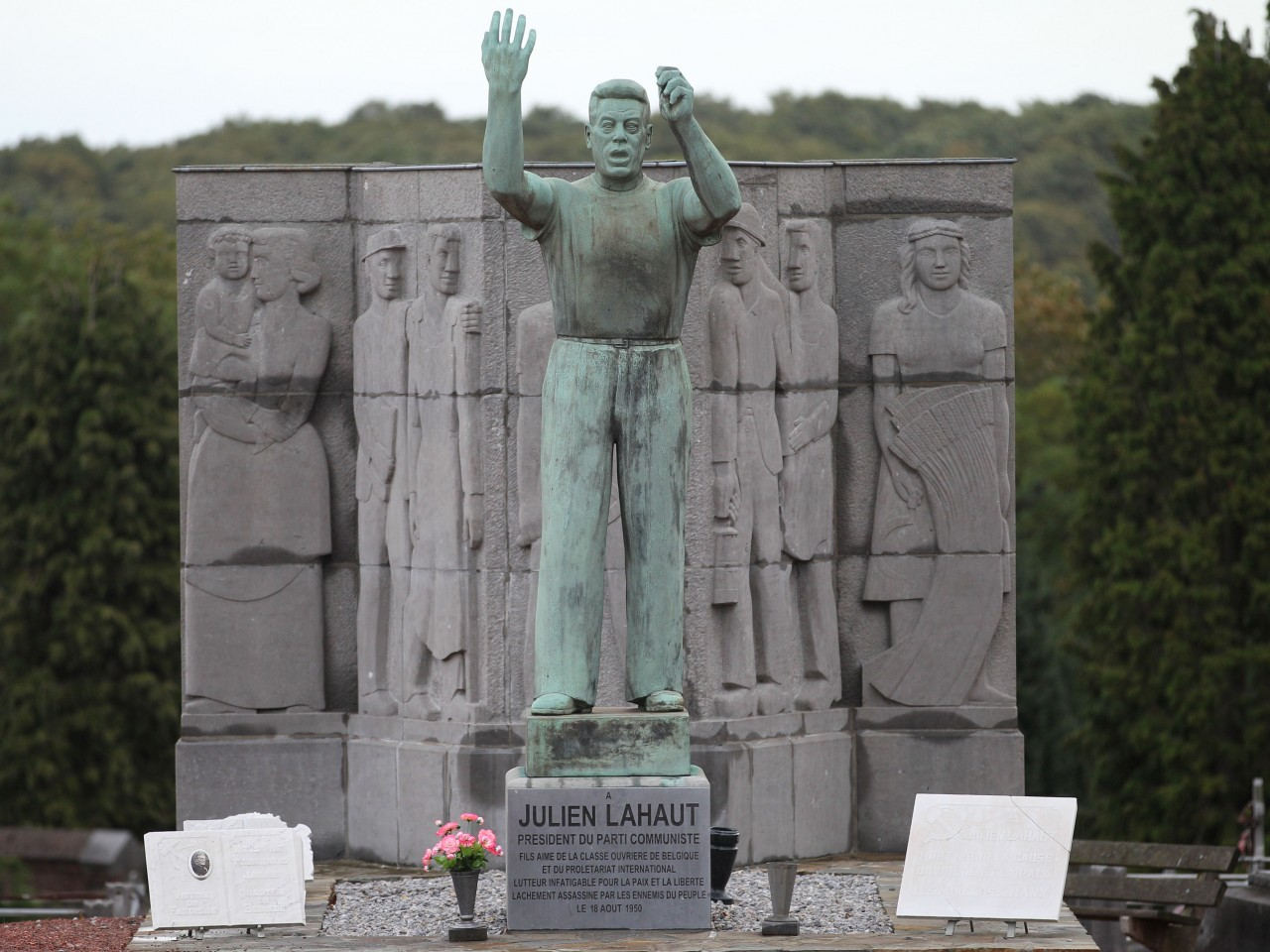
Monument to Julien Lahaut

=== Identification of the perpetrators ===
François Goossens, an insurance agent with Leopoldist leanings from Halle, was later identified as one of the murderers, although it remained uncertain whether he fired the actual shots. Goossens was tracked and anonymously implied in a 1985 research work by Etienne Verhoeyen and Rudi Van Doorslaer of the CegeSoma. In 2002, senator Vincent Van Quickenborne publicly revealed the true identity of Goossens.

In 2007, an episode of the television programme Keerpunt on the chain Canvas featured Eugeen Devillé, an elderly man from Halle, who stated that he had personally partaken in the murder of Lahaut. According to Devillé, there had been four perpetrators: himself (25 at the time), his brother Alex (30), their brother-in-law Jan Hamelrijck (24) and the aforementioned François Goossens (40). He also claimed to have been the person firing the fatal shots.

On 19 July 2012, the Senate agreed to consider a legal proposal to extend funding for a historical study on the assassination. On 17 August 2012, the minister Paul Magnette announced a federal contribution of €320,000 to the study.

=== Involvement of André Moyen ===
In 2015, another team of historians at the CegeSoma (this time under the supervision of Emmanuel Gerard) linked the murder to anti-communist and royalist elements inside the General Information and Security Service. While agreeing that Goossens, the Devillé brothers and Hamelrijck were the direct perpetrators, they pointed to André Moyen as a key figure in the stay-behind network that Goossens and his accomplices worked for. This clandestine intelligence group had direct ties to the official police services. Moyen was furthermore supported by prominent Belgian corporations and financial institutions including the Société Générale, the Union Minière and Brufina. His network was allowed to set up its headquarters free of charge in a building owned by the Union Minière in the center of Brussels, and intelligence reports by Moyen were shared both with the official military intelligence services and with the companies that supported him.

The researchers uncovered a secret August 1950 note from Moyen (shared with minister Albert de Vleeschauwer among others). In it, he defends the "execution" of Lahaut as a "necessary measure" because the Belgian government was supposedly not taking sufficient action against the perceived fifth column which the communists constituted. The researchers state that Moyen was implementing a strategy of tension as he hoped that violence and instability would lead to the creation of an authoritarian right-wing regime. However, Moyen had already died in 2008 and no one was ever put on trial for the murder.

== Legacy and popular culture ==
In 1951 editorial cartoonist André Jacquemotte drew a biographical comic strip about Julien Lahaut's life, which ran in the magazine Jeunesse Belgique.

The left-wing playwright Jean Louvet authored a play about Lahaut's assassination entitled L'homme qui avait le soleil dans sa poche (lit. 'The Man who had the Sun in his Pocket') which was published in 1982.

A similar incident to Lahaut's 1950 intervention happened in 1993 when Baudouin’s brother and successor Albert II took the oath: libertarian politician Jean-Pierre Van Rossem shouted “Vive la république d'Europe, vive Julien Lahaut!” (“Long live the republic of Europe, long live Julien Lahaut!”).

== See also ==
- Royal Question

== Sources ==
- Rudy Van Doorslaer & Etienne Verhoeyen, L'assassinat de Julien Lahaut, EPO, Bruxelles, 1987.
- Gerard, Emmanuel (2016). "The Murder of Julien Lahaut (1950)and the Anti-Communist Campaign in Belgium". Dutch Crossing. 40 (1): 54–67. doi:10.1080/03096564.2016.1129193. S2CID 155868594.
- Steinberg, Maxime (1976). "Julien-Victor Lahaut". Biographie nationale. Vol. 39. Brussels: Académie royale des sciences des lettres et des beaux arts de Belgique. pp. 569–84.
