= Oversight Committee =

Oversight Committee can refer to:

- IETF Administrative Oversight Committee
- United States House Committee on Oversight and Government Reform
- Norwegian Parliamentary Intelligence Oversight Committee
- Committee I or the Permanent Oversight Committee on the Intelligence and Security Services
- Parliamentary Oversight Panel, in German Parlamentarisches Kontrollgremium (PKGr)
