= VSSE =

VSSE may refer to:

- Veiligheid van de Staat - Sureté de l'État, the State Security Service (Belgium)
- The Vital Situation, Swift-Elimination International Intelligence Agency; a fictional organization in the Time Crisis series of video games
