= RR-49 =

The RR-49 is a transistorised miniature clandestine shortwave radio receiver developed in 1964 by Rockwell Collins and Delco Electronics for the US Central Intelligence Agency (CIA). It was built for secret agent communication at the height of the Cold War and could be operated either as a standalone device or as part of the modular RS-49 HF Radio Set but also as a stand-alone receiver by the CIA, the West German BND and the Belgian SDRA-8.
