= Robert Jan Verbelen =

Belgian Nazi collaborator

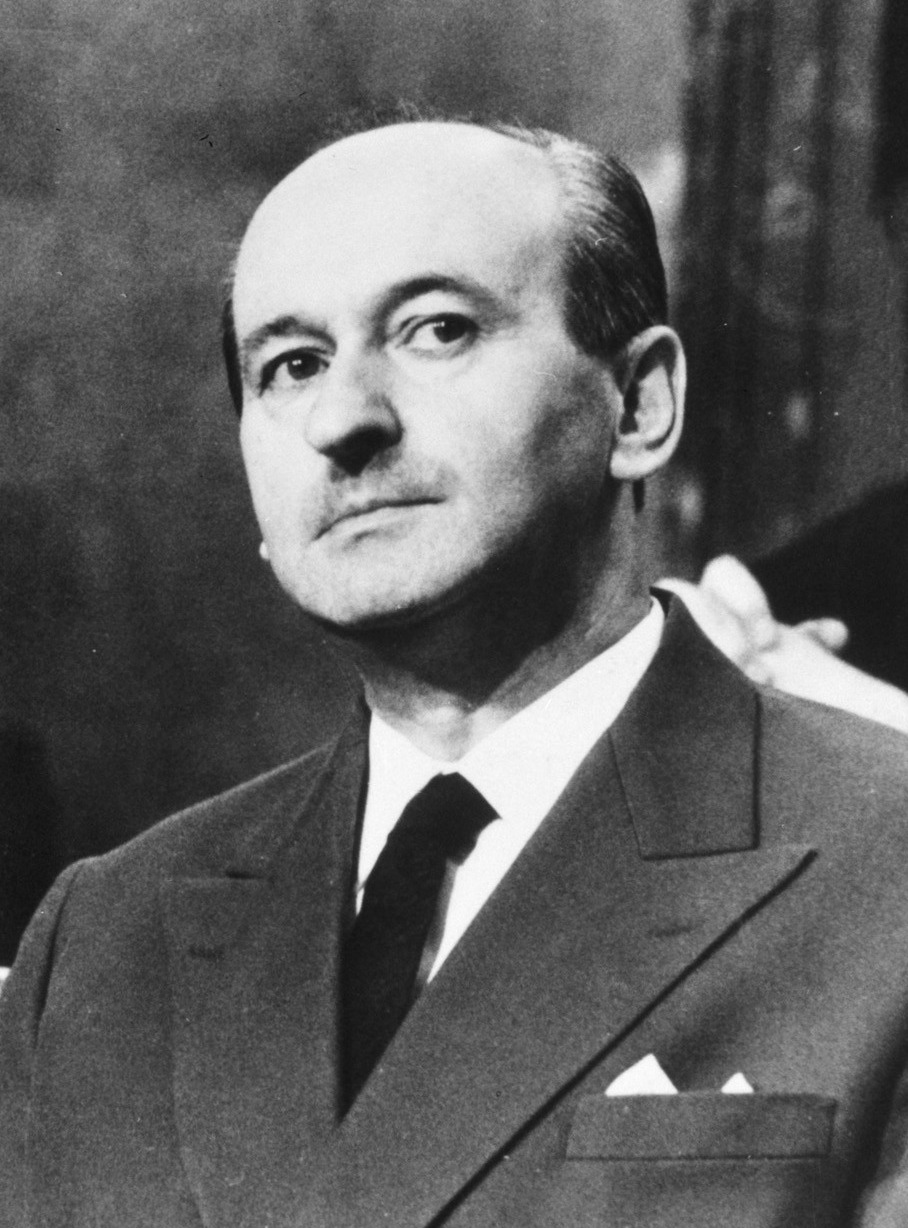
Robert Jan Verbelen in 1965

Robert Jan Verbelen (5 April 1911, Herent, Belgium – 28 October 1990, Vienna, Austria) was a Belgian Nazi collaborator. In the final years of World War II, Verbelen led the De Vlag Veiligheidscorps, a Nazi SS security force in Belgium. In this role, he ordered the assassination of Alexandre Galopin, director of the Société Générale de Belgique, and attempted to kill Albert Devèze (Minister of State), Charles Collard-de Sloovere (Attorney General), and Robert de Foy (former State Security director). In 1947, a Belgian court sentenced to him to death after finding him responsible for the deaths of 101 Belgian resistance fighters.

After the liberation of Belgium during the Second World War, Verbelen fled through Germany to Austria, where he worked for eight years for the Counter Intelligence Corps of the United States Army although he had been convicted as a war criminal in Belgium. He obtained Austrian citizenship in 1959. In 1965, Verbelen was charged with five murders by a court in Austria. However, he was acquitted on all counts.

== Sources ==
- Gerald Steinacher, Nazis auf der Flucht. Wie Kriegsverbrecher über Italien nach Übersee entkamen. Studienverlag Wien-Innsbruck-München 2008 ISBN 978-3-7065-4026-1
