= Benoît de Bonvoisin =

Belgian businessman (born 1939)

- Born: 14 March 1939 (age 87)
- Occupation: Businessman

Benoît, Baron de Bonvoisin (born 14 March 1939), also known as The Black Baron, is a Belgian far-right activist.

== Biography ==
He is the grandson of Alexandre Galopin (1879–1944), former director and governor of the Société Générale de Belgique (the main financial group of the country), and son of baron Pierre de Bonvoisin (b. 1903), also a director of the Société Générale and of the insurance group AG, among others.

Bonvoisin was the owner of the Cidep company, which published the magazine Nouvelle Europe Magazine.

== Legal controversies ==
Although convicted to one-year imprisonment in 1986 for his connection to the bankruptcy of the Boomse Metaalwerken, de Bonvoisin was cleared of this crime in May 2000. In 1996, de Bonvoisin would be tried for fraud, involving his Cidep and PDG companies. In the case of Cidep he was cleared, the case PDG was annulled.

In the so-called Dutroux files, Bonvoisin was named as a possible mastermind behind an alleged child trafficking network said to have spanned several Western European countries. Several survivors testified against him at the time. However, the allegations made against him were never conclusively resolved in court proceedings, as no charges were brought against Bonvoisin in this connection.

Bonvoisin was also a member of the think tank ‘Le Cercle’.

== Connections to the far right ==
De Bonvoisin is connected to various far-right Belgian movements. According to Serge Dumont, he was from 1974 on the national treasurer of the "CEPIC", at the time a far right organization within the Parti Social Chrétien. He used his connections with the business world to finance this organization. In 1975 he was involved in plans for the foundation of the far right political movement "Forces Nouvelles" (New Powers) through the reading circles of Nouvelle Europe Magazine.

Investigative journalist Walter De Bock mentions him as an important factor in a case of illegal campaign funding for Paul Vanden Boeynants, former Belgian Prime Minister and then Minister of Defence by contractors working for the ministry of defence. According to a note from the Belgian State Security, published by De Bock, de Bonvoisin financially supported the Front de la Jeunesse, a private militia disbanded in 1983.

Hugo Gijsels alleges that de Bonvoisin, through his company PDG, was the main financer of Inforep, the publication of the "Public Information Office" (PIO) of the Belgian Ministry of Defence. In 1978, PIO was disbanded by the General Staff of the army for its connections with the far right. The organization was later connected, by the Belgian Parliamentary Special Inquiry Committee, to the Belgian part of the Operation Gladio. Gijsels likewise linked de Bonvoisin to preparations for a far-right coup in 1973–1974, allegedly inspired by the Greek junta. According to Gijsels, de Bonvoisin organized the coup attempt alongside former minister José Desmarets and a number of prominent functionaries and military officers including Jean Militis.

De Bonvoisin is pejoratively nicknamed the "Black Baron," for alleged connections to the Nijvel Gang, CCC and Gladio, and the financing of "fascist and militant groups." The term was first coined by Albert Raes, former head of the Belgian State Security Service.
