= Cecile Harnie =

Belgian politician (born 1945)

Senator in the Senate of Belgium
- In office 14 January 1988 – 1 January 1993

Personal details
- Born: 17 April 1945 (age 81) Halle, Belgium
- Party: Agalev

Cecile Harnie (born 17 April 1945) is a former Belgian politician and trade unionist.

== Early life ==
Harnie was born on 17 April 1945 in Halle, Belgium. She attended the Heilig Hart Instituut in Halle, where she received a higher secondary technical education and she studied to become an educator. She was a school secretary from 1963 to 1967 before becoming a propagandist with the Vrouwelijke Kristelijke Arbeiders Jeugel (VKAJ), which represented young female Christian workers, until 1971. She was a food industry worker until 1974 before returning to VKAJ to work as a propagandist for the national organisation. She was an education worker for the Confederation of Christian Trade Unions from 1978 to 1988. She was also an active member of the Werkgroep Kristelijke Arebeiders partij (WKAP) from 1980 to 1985.

== Political career ==
She was first appointed to the Senate of Belgium as a representative of the Agalev political party. She was a co-opted senator from 14 January 1988 until 23 November 1991. In the 1991 general election, she was elected as the directly elected senator for the Brussels district. She was a member of the commission investigating the Belgian stay-behind network, which she later criticised for being unable to determine whether there was a connection to the Brabant massacres. She called for further investigations to focus on NATO's role.

On 7 February 1992, as a result of the then-existing dual mandate, Harnie also began serving as a representative in the Flemish Council. She was the chair of the women's working group as well as a permanent member of the Advisory and Consultation Committee for Brussels and Flemish Brabant and the working group for Brussels and Flemish Brabant. She announced in 1992 that she would not be running for re-election after her term ended and that she was resigning from Agalev. She left office on 1 January 1993.
