= José Desmarets =

Belgian politician (1925–2019)

José Desmarets (French pronunciation: [ʒoze demaʁɛ]; 16 September 1925 – 9 August 2019) was a Belgian politician in the Christian Social Party who served as a minister in the government of Wilfried Martens (1979–1981). In 1982 Yad Vashem recognised Desmarets and his father as Righteous Among the Nations for having risked their lives to help a Jewish fugitive during the Second World War, when he was still a student.

Desmarets was born in Schaerbeek, Belgium, on 16 September 1925, the son of a pastry baker. He studied political science and law, and began his political career as an alderman in Uccle. He served in turn as Minister of Defence (1979–1980), Minister of Planning (1980) and Minister of the Middle Classes (1980–1981). He died on 9 August 2019 at the age of 93. He was remembered as a man who had always fought against both right-wing and left-wing extremism.

Investigative journalist Hugo Gijsels alleged in 1990 that Desmarets had been among those involved in a far-right coup attempt in 1973-1974, inspired by the Greek junta. According to Gijsels, a number of prominent functionaries and military officers including Benoît de Bonvoisin and Jean Militis were complicit in this coup attempt alongside Desmarets.
