= Albert De Vleeschauwer =

Belgian politician (1897–1971)

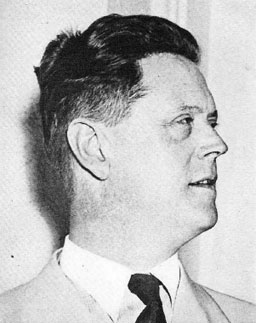
De Vleeschauwer in 1942

Albert De Vleeschauwer, later Baron Albert De Vleeschauwer van Braekel, (1 January 1897 in Nederbrakel – 24 February 1971 in Kortenberg) was a Belgian politician of the Catholic Party.

De Vleeschauwer served as Catholic deputy for the Leuven area from 1932 until 1960. He was Minister of the Colonies from March 1938 to February 1945 (briefly interrupted in 1939). During World War II, he also served as Minister of Justice (October 1940 – October 1942) and Minister of Public Education (October 1942 – September 1944) in addition, as part of the Belgian government in exile. After the war he served as Minister of the Interior from 1949 to 1950 and Minister of Agriculture from 1958 to 1960.

== Early career ==
Albert de Vleeschauwer joined the Belgian Army straight from school in 1916. After the war he took both a law degree and a degree in philosophy at the University of Louvain. He became a lawyer in 1924 and also joined the research department of the Boerenbond, the Catholic Farmers' Union. In 1926 he became its head and in 1928 was appointed lecturer at the University's Agricultural Department. He served as chef de cabinet to Hendrik Baels, the Minister of Agriculture, in 1929–1930 and began his political career in 1932 when he was elected member of parliament for Leuven. He had an outspoken Christian democrat profile as one of the founders of the Katholieke Vlaamsche Volkspartij in 1936 . In May 1938 he joins Paul-Henri Spaak's tripartite coalition government, replacing his colleague Edmond Rubens after the latter's unexpected death.

== Second World War ==
After the German invasion of Belgium in May 1940, most of the Belgian government fled to Paris and Limoges while the Colonial Ministry went straight to Bordeaux. On 15 June the Belgian cabinet decided to continue the war from Britain but did not carry out its decision. Instead it followed the French government to Bordeaux. In a cabinet meeting on 18 June, the three ministers expressed the desire to flee to London to continue the war: Camille Gutt, Albert de Vleeschauwer and Marcel-Henri Jaspar. Jaspar left for London that very day, without the consent of his colleagues and was officially thrown out of the cabinet.

On 18 June 1940, the Belgian government issued a decree that gave de Vleeschauwer full legislative and executive power to manage the Congo as administrator-general. The decree also stated that if the minister was unable to fulfill his office, that power would be passed on to the governor-general, Pierre Ryckmans. De Vleeschauwer was given the title of Administrateur Général des Colonies with the mission, and full powers, to protect the Congo's interests abroad.

The Minister, his family and a few friends were granted visas by the Portuguese consul Aristides de Sousa Mendes and left for Portugal that same month. There they stayed with the Sousa Mendes family at Casa do Passal in Cabanas de Viriato. Knowing his family was safe, de Vleeschauwer moved to Estoril with other members of the Belgian government in exile, staying at the Hotel de Inglaterra, between 26 June and 8 August 1940. Towards the end of the war, his wife Yvonne and four of his five children also stayed in Portugal, in Monte Estoril, at the Hotel Miramar, between 25 November 1944 and 4 April 1945.

While in Portugal, he frequently went to Lisbon and met up, unexpectedly, with Fernand Vanlangenhove, Secretary General of Foreign Affairs. Vanlangenhove had refused to return to Brussels and had been given an unspecified mission by Spaak, with the rank of ambassador. On their arrival in Lisbon they sent a telegram to all the heads of Belgian Diplomatic Missions and to the Governor-General of the Congo, announcing that a legally mandated member of the government was out of reach of the enemy and that their loyalty remained to the official government. On receipt of this message the Belgian ambassador in London, Emile de Cartier de Marchienne, warned de Vleeschauwer that Jaspar, together with Camille Huysmans, chairman of the Socialist International, was attempting to establish his own "free" government in London. De Vleeschauwer flew to London on July 4, where he was received by Lord Halifax (5 July) and by Winston Churchill (8 July) and offered them the full support of the Belgian Congo, provided they refuse to back Jaspar's initiative. He met with Churchill and declared that he was 'delivering' the Congo to him.

In his capacity as Minister for the Colonies and as Administrator-general of the Belgian Congo, he placed the entire production of all raw materials at the disposition of Great Britain in the war against Nazi Germany.

While accepting, Churchill expressed the wish to see the official Belgian government established in London. De Vleeschauwer promised to do the utmost and left London on 16 July and returned to Estoril, Portugal. Poor communications and French interference caused considerable delay, and only on August 2 did de Vleeschauwer manage to meet Hubert Pierlot, Paul-Henri Spaak and Camille Gutt on the French–Spanish border at the Col du Perthus. He succeeded in persuading Pierlot and Spaak. Gutt, already intending to leave and already with the required visa, accompanied de Vleeschauwer back to London, where they arrived on 8 August. Pierlot and Spaak returned to Vichy to convince their colleagues to resign. After succeeding at a last cabinet meeting (25 August), the two ministers left France on 27 August. They reached London on 22 October after escaping from their confinement in Barcelona. On 31 October, the four ministers held their first cabinet meeting in London.

De Vleeschauwer traveled to the Congo in December 1940, returning in March 1941. At this time the decision was made to commit Congolese troops to the British campaign against the Italians in Abyssinia. These troops left Congo for Sudan in March, from where they entered Abyssinia and took the towns of Asosa and Saïo in May. A medical unit also participated in the Madagascan landings and fighting in Burma. In May 1942 De Vleeschauwer made a second trip to Congo. The American government also started its Manhattan Project in 1942 and conducted negotiations concerning the supply of uranium from the main Congolese mining company Union Minière du Haut Katanga. These were only finalized on the day the Belgian government returned to Brussels on 8 September 1944.

== Post-war years ==
As a staunch monarchist, after leaving the government in February 1945 De Vleeschauwer committed himself to the defence of King Leopold and campaigned vigorously for his return to the throne. When his party gained a majority in the elections of 1949, he entered the first Gaston Eyskens cabinet as Minister of the Interior. The succeeding government led by Jean Duvieusart failed in its attempt to restore the King to his throne and resigned after settling for an abdication in favour of his son Baudouin (August 1950). De Vleeschauwer joins the government one last time (Eyskens II) in June 1958. This cabinet granted independence to Congo in July 1960. The political turmoil that followed became fatal to De Vleeschauwer. A Belgian court case unexpectedly connected him to a Léopoldville bankruptcy dating back to 1956. De Vleeschauwer resigned in November 1960 and had to wait till May 1964 before he was cleared of all the charges brought against him.

De Vleeschauwer maintained long-standing contacts with the anti-communist intelligence officer André Moyen, who has been linked to a larger Belgian stay-behind network. For instance, a May 1950 report by Moyen informed De Vleeschauwer that in case of an insurrection, the far-right royalist group Eldrie would join the ranks of the Gendarmerie to suppress it. Moyen kept informing De Vleeschauwer for years after the latter already quit his position, sending him almost a thousand reports between 1949 and 1961.

== Honours ==
- 1947 : Medal for Merit Awarded by President of the United States Medal for Merit.
- 1949 : Knight grand Cross in the Royal Order of the Lion.
- 1954 : Knight grand Cross in the Order of the Crown.
