= Robert de Foy =

Belgian Magistrate

Robert Herman Alfred de Foy CBE (23 March 1893 in Geraardsbergen – 15 August 1960 in Brussels) was a Belgian magistrate who served as head of the State Security Service during the Nazi occupation of Belgium. His conduct in that role is the subject of considerable historical debate, though after the Second World War, he returned to his pre-war positions, was decorated as a Grand Officer of the Order of Leopold II, and was honoured by the State of Israel as a Righteous Among the Nations.

== Personal life ==
Robert de Foy was the son of the civil servant Léon de Foy (1852–1942) and his wife Mathilde (née de Vos; 1860–1943). His brother Marcel de Foy (1890–1964) ended his career as President of the Court of Appeal in Brussels, and his brother Joseph de Foy (1897–1967) was an officer in the Belgian Army. In 1919, Léon obtained the change of his name from "Defoy" to "de Foy", and in 1934, he was elevated to the Belgian nobility.

In 1941, Robert de Foy married Françoise du Monceau de Bergendal (b. 1910), the sister of Count Ivan du Monceau de Bergendal (1909–2005), who had been deputy prosecutor in Brussels during the war, and founder of the satirical weekly called Pan. They divorced in 1943. In 1946, he married the widow Marguerite Tallon (1893–1960). Both marriages remained childless.

== Early career ==
After serving in the Belgian Army during World War I, Robert studied law, obtaining a PhD. He decided to become a magistrate. From 1922 to 1925 he was a judge within the military court in the Belgian army of occupation of the Ruhr, Germany. From 1925 to 1929 he was first substitute of the Public Prosecutor in Antwerp.

He then became deputy administrator in the Department of Belgian Public Security. From 8 August 1933, after the sudden death of his predecessor, Baron René Beltjens (1879–1933), he became acting administrator.

== Administrator-general of the Belgian State Security Service: 1933–1940 ==
Appointed as head of the Belgian civil intelligence service, the State Security, on 30 December 1934, de Foy had to deal with the problems of rising international tensions.

Many countries considered communism as the most important threat. Security services of neutral countries like the Netherlands, Switzerland and Belgium attended conferences with other nations, including Nazi Germany, to consider their position towards communism. Such a conference took place in Berlin from 30 August until 3 September 1937; de Foy attended only at the end. He was rather reserved about such meetings, and reduced his own participation to a minimum. After the war he declared to an investigating magistrate and to a journalist of the Associated Press that there had never been deals made between the Gestapo and the Belgian police services for a joint battle against communism.

During De Foy's tenure German espionage in Belgium was on the rise. De Foy became the first head of the Belgian secret service to give the media an interview about the work of the State Security, in which he paid particular attention to its counterespionage mission.

In June 1938, de Foy and J. Schneider, the Director of the Ministry of Foreign Affairs and Foreign Trade, represented Belgium at the Evian Conference in France. By March 1938, after Germany had annexed Austria in the Anschluss, the number of non-Belgian resident Jews had risen to 30,000. The Evian Conference was seen by all as a failure, failing to reach agreement on the number of Jews that were to move onwards to the United Kingdom and the United States.

With war approaching, the Belgian government, represented by the then minister of Justice Charles du Bus de Warnaffe, ordered De Foy to draw up lists of "suspect Belgians and foreigners." On the list were the leaders of extreme right and fascist movements, such as REX (Leon Degrelle), the Flemish nationalist movement, Verdinaso (Joris van Severen), and others, but also communist leaders. If the Germans attacked they would have to be arrested and confined into safe places. The list also mentioned Germans or other foreigners of whom it was not certain if they sympathised with the Nazis, despite the fact that many of them were Jewish refugees. On 10 May 1940, the Germans having invaded Belgium, telegrams were sent to local police authorities, signed "de Foy" (it is still disputed if he actually sent them) to set in motion the arrests and the deportations to France.

== During the war ==
After Belgium was attacked and its army surrendered on 28 May 1940, Adolf Hitler chose not to install a civilian government (as he had done in the Netherlands), but a military occupation, headed by Wehrmacht General Alexander von Falkenhausen. The Belgian administration remained in place and, under German supervision, governed Belgium, according to the developed theory of "the lesser evil". The State Security was abolished by the Germans, but it remained in existence in exile in London, under the directorship of Fernand Lepage.

Upon the return in July 1940 of the deported Flemish nationalists, de Foy and other civil servants branded as responsible were arrested. He was transported to Germany, initially held in a hotel in Münster and then transferred to Berlin. Questioned and held for a few weeks, he was released and returned to Belgium. Police Chief Reinhard Heydrich communicated directly to General Eggert Reeder that de Foy was to remain untouched and resume his activities. Allowed to stay in position, de Foy was ordered by the Nazi-run government to share his lists of suspect persons with all state organisations and then to round them up. This included Flemish nationalists, communists and non-Belgian citizens, most of them Jewish refugees from Germany and Poland. These people were exported to France on so-called "phantom trains", the records for which were destroyed, but it is known that at least 3,000 were arrested in Antwerp alone. A phantom train on which Joris van Severen, leader of the pro-Belgian Fascist party, was among 79 people deported is well recorded, as 21 people were killed by French soldiers at Abbeville. Of the people deported on "phantom trains," most including the Belgian Jews were released by the Wehrmacht, the only Jews released by the Nazi German Army. 3,537 Jews holding German and Austrian passports were kept prisoner and transported to Auschwitz-Birkenau for processing.

On 1 October 1943, de Foy succeeded Gaston Schuind as Secretary General of the Department of Justice. At the same time, the Wehrmacht took over the policing of foreigners in Belgium, and arrests and deportation greatly escalated.

Upon the Allied Forces' invasion of Normandy in June, the Nazis relieved de Foy of his position. In part, this was driven by the rumours that he was "London's man", having made contact, according to post-war records, with the Belgian Resistance via both Walter Ganshof van der Meersch and William Ugeux.

After Robert Jan Verbelen was made head of the De Vlag Veiligheidscorps, a Nazi SS security force in Belgium, an attempt on the life of de Foy failed. During the last weeks of the occupation, he went into hiding.

== Post World War II ==
On 1 September 1944, like most other Belgian officials in the administration, de Foy was suspended by the Belgian government returning from exile in London, although it was stated that he had acted correctly. A judicial investigation was initiated against him, but unlike many others, he was not jailed. The result was that his conduct was judged as having been blameless. From April 1946 to March 1947, he was appointed a judge in the international court seated in Tangier.

Upon his return to Belgium, de Foy resumed his duties as head of the State Security Service. The major part of his work consisted of tracking Soviet agents and spies as part of Cold War NATO activities. State Security was also tasked with organising "stay behind" groups, who would have resisted any Soviet Army invading force. De Foy retired in 1958, handing over operations to Ludovic Caeymaex.

== Honours ==
De Foy was vice-president of the Carnegie Hero Fund.

On 1 December 1975 he was posthumously recognised as "Righteous Among the Nations" by Yad Vashem, for the help he had provided to Jews in Belgium.

He was the beneficiary of many honours, mainly after World War II, including:

- Belgium:
  - Grand Officer of the Order of Leopold II
  - Commander of the Order of Leopold
  - Commander of the Order of the Crown
  - Civic Cross First Class
- Other Countries
  - Grand Officer of the Order of Ouissam Alaouite (Morocco)
  - Grand Officer of the Order of Merit (Italy)
  - Grand Officer of the Order of Orange-Nassau (Netherlands)
  - Grand Officer of the Order of Vasa (Sweden) (1937)
  - Grand Officer of the Crown (Romania)
  - Grand Officer of the Order of the Phoenix (Greece)
  - Commander of the Order of the Redeemer (Greece)
  - Commander of the Legion d'Honneur (France)
  - Commander of The Most Excellent Order of the British Empire (CBE)
  - Commander of the Order of the White Eagle (Estonia)
  - Commander of the Order of Merit (Austria)
  - Commander of the Order of Polonia Restituta (Poland)

== Literature ==
- J. GERARD-LIBOIS & José GOTOVICH, L'an 40. La Belgique occupée, Brussels, 1971
- Albert DE JONGHE, De strijd Himmler-Reeder om de benoeming van een HSSPF te Brussel. Deel 3, Bijdragen tot de geschiedenis van de Tweede Wereldoorlog, 5, 1978, p. 133–147.
- Jean VANWELKENHUYZEN, Les avertissements qui venaient de Berlin, 9 octobre 1939 – 10 mai 1940, Brussels, 1982
- Maurice DE WILDE, België in de Tweede wereldoorlog, Deel 3, Kapellen, 1982
- Rudi VAN DOORSLAER & Etienne VERHOEYEN, L'Allemagne nazie, la police belge et l'anticommunisme en Belgique (1936–1944) – Aspects des relations belgo-allemandes, in: Belgisch tijdschrift voor nieuwste geschiedenis, 1986, blz. 61–121
- M. VAN DEN WIJNGAERT, Tussen vijand en volk. Het bestuur van de secretarissen-generaal tijdens de Duitse bezetting 1940–1944, in: België in de Tweede Wereldoorlog. Deel 9, Het minste kwaad, uitg. DNB, Pelckmans, Kapellen, 1990
- Rudi VAN DOORSLAER, De Belgische politie en magistratuur en het probleem van de ordehandhaving, in: België in de Tweede Wereldoorlog. Deel 9, Het minste kwaad, uitg. DNB, Pelckmans, Kapellen, 1990
- Fred ERDMAN & Hervé HASQUIN (rapporteurs), Parlementair onderzoek naar het bestaan in België van een geheim internationaal inlichtingennetwerk, Belgische Senaat, 1990–1991 (referentie: 1117-4)
- Guy BEAUJOUAN, Anne-Marie BOURGOIN, Pierre CEZARD, Marie-Thérèse CHABORD, Élisabeth DUNAN, Jean-Daniel PARISET, Christian WILSDORF, La France et la Belgique sous l’occupation allemande 1940–1944. Les fonds allemands conservés au Centre Historique des Archives nationales. Inventaire de la sous-série AJ 40, (revu par Christine Douyère-Demeulenaere avec la collaboration de Michèle Conchon. Index établi par Sandrine Bula. Introduction par Stefan Martens et Andreas Nielen), Paris 2002.
- Maxime STEINBERG, La persécution des Juifs en Belgique (1940–1945), Brussels, 2004
- Nico WOUTERS, Oorlogsburgemeesters 40–44. Lokaal bestuur en collaboratie in België, Tielt, 2004
- Dan MIKHAM, Israel GUTMAN, Sara BENDER, The encyclopaedia of the righteous among the nations: rescuers of Jews during the Holocaust. Belgium, Volume 2, Yad Vashem, 2005
- Emmanuel DEBRUYNE, Un service secret en exil. L’Administration de la Sûreté de l’État à Londres, novembre 1940 – septembre 1944, in: Cahiers d'Histoire du Temps présent, n° 15, 2005, p. 335–355.
- P. PONSAERTS, M. COOLS, K. DASSEN, R. LIBERT, La Sûreté. Essais sur les 175 ans de la Sûreté de l'État, Politeia, 2005
- Nico WOUTERS, De Führerstaat. Overheid en Collaboratie in België, 1940–1944, Tielt, 2006
- Humbert DE MARNIX DE SAINTE ALDEGONDE, État présent de la noblesse belge. Annuaire de 2006, Brussels, 2006
- Rudi VAN DOORSLAER e. a., La Belgique docile, les autorités belges et la persécution des Juifs en Belgique, Volume 1, Antwerp, 2007
- Emmanuel DEBRUYNE, La guerre secrète des espions belges, 1940–1944, Brussel, 2008
- *Lasoen, Kenneth (2016). "185 Years of Belgian Security Service". Journal of Intelligence History. 15 (2): 98–116. doi:10.1080/16161262.2016.1145854. S2CID 147394882.
- Kenneth LASOEN, Geheim België. Geschiedenis van de inlichtingendiensten, 1830-2020, Tielt: Lannoo 2020.
