= Federal Public Service Justice =

Logo of FPS Justice in the 3 official languages of Belgium (from top: Dutch, French and German)

The FPS Justice (Dutch: FOD Justitie, French: SPF Justice, German: FÖD Justiz), formerly the Ministry of Justice, is a federal public service of Belgium. It was created by royal order on 23 May 2001, as part of the plans of the Verhofstadt I Government (1999–2003) to modernise the federal administration. The transformation from a ministry into a federal public service was completed on 15 July 2002.

The FPS Justice is responsible to the Minister of Justice.

== Organisation ==
The FPS Justice is currently organised into three directorates-general:

- Directorate-General for Judicial Organisation
- Directorate-General for Legislation and Fundamental Rights and Freedoms
- Directorate-General for Correctional Facilities

Several independent organisations resort under the FPS Justice, such as the Gambling Commission. In addition, the FPS Justice is also responsible for the Belgian Official Journal. The Belgian State Security Service is responsible to the minister of justice as well.

== See also ==
- Justice ministry
- Politics of Belgium
