= Belgian Official Gazette =

Government gazette of Belgium

Moniteur Belge Belgisch Staatsblad
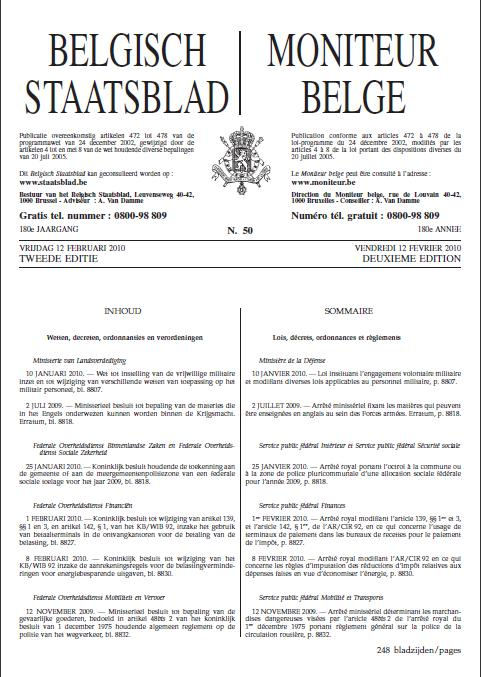
- The front page of the official journal for 12 February 2010.
- Type: Government gazette
- Format: Online only
- Publisher: Federal Public Service Justice
- Founded: 16 June 1831 (195 years ago)
- Language: French, Dutch, German
- Website: www.ejustice.just.fgov.be/cgi/welcome.pl

The Belgisch Staatsblad (Dutch) or Moniteur belge (French) is the official journal or gazette of the Kingdom of Belgium. It is where the official publication of laws, royal decrees, decrees, ordinances, and official notices are published. The publication is handled by the Federal Public Service Justice.

== Content and history ==
Any new law, or amendments thereto enacted by the government, enter into force only upon their publication in the Staatsblad/Moniteur. Other legal notices requiring public disclosure, such as the establishment of a business, are likewise published in this journal. In addition, it carries notices of Court mourning following the deaths of prominent figures, as well as announcements of official Court banquets, including transcripts of the speeches delivered on such occasions.

The journal was established on 16 June 1831 shortly after the Belgian Revolution.

During World War II, the journal continued to be published in German-occupied Belgium. At the same time, a separate publication bearing the same title was issued by the Belgian government in exile. After the Liberation of Belgium, both were considered valid historical continuations of the prewar journal. To distinguish between the two, the version issued by the government in exile is retrospectively referred to as Belgian Official Journal (Exile Government).

In 2003, the printed edition of the Staatsblad/Moniteur was discontinued for cost-saving reasons and replaced by an electronic version made publicly accessible on the Internet. Nevertheless, three copies of each issue continue to be printed: one for the Royal Library, one for the Senate, and one for the Chamber of Representatives.

== See also ==
- Official Journal of the European Union
