= Albert Raes =

Albert Raes (Bruges 21 February 1932) was a Belgian magistrate and was head of the Belgian Security Services from 1977 until 1990.

== Biography ==
Raes is the son of Firmin Raes, who was an executive at the train and railway manufacturer La Brugeoise and the chief of the Chamber of Rhetoric De Drie Santinnen. Albert Raes is married and has two daughters.

He finished his secondary school at the Sint-Lodewijks College in Bruges (rhetorics 1951) and continued at the University of Louvain. He graduated in 1955 as a doctor of law.

In 1955 he organized a congress in Bruges on behalf of the Nouvelles Equipes Internationales, the group of Christian democratic parties in Europe, predecessor of the European Christian-democratic party (EVP). He also organized a gathering of the European Young Christian Democrats. He completed his military service at the First Regiment of Horse Guards and ended as a reserve officer. Back in Bruges, he started working at the offices of the Officer of public prosecution.

Soon he was made a private secretary of minister Albert De Gryse (PTT). He continued as member of the staff of the ministers Arthur Gilson (Home Office), André Dequae (Finances), Pierre Wigny (Justice) and Paul-Willem Segers (Defense). In the meantime he was appointed as prosecutor at the courts in Courtrai and Bruges.

In 1969 he was appointed assistant administrator-general of the Belgian Security services, under Ludovic Caeymaex, to who he succeeded in 1977. He remained in this capacity until June 1990.

== Achievements ==
Under the directorship of Raes, the Belgian secret services continued the battle against all things considered as subversive, amongst others:

- The sustained actions against the secret services of the Warsaw Pact, more in particular the KGB, very active in Belgium because of the prominent presence of NATO, SHAPE and the European Commission. During the 1970s and 80s, more than 50 foreign intelligence officers, together with their networks and circuits, were neutralized through diplomatic or judicial channels.
- Terrorists of the IRA were apprehended. The affair of the ex-father Patrick Ryan received an important notoriety. The United Kingdom demanded his extradition, but a Belgian justice decision extradited him astonishingly to Ireland.
- Syrian terrorist cells, active in Belgium, were dismantled.
- For the first time in Europe, terrorists and arms dealers from the ETA Basque movement were identified by Belgium and extradited to Spain.
- The Libyan Navy offered the Palestinian terror group Abou Nidal the small boarded contraband ship Silco and its five crew members, belonging to the Belgian Houtekint-Cats family. This became an international affair. The Belgian secret services, helped by half a dozen friendly services, succeeded in repatriating the family.

From 1977 to 1990 Raes was the dean of the Club of Bern, of which he was a co-founder in 1970. The heads of the secret services of a dozen European countries, including Switzerland, met regularly to exchange information and evaluate sensible dossiers.

== Controversial times ==
During the years 1970 and 1980 the Belgian Security services encountered regularly controversy. Allegations of malfunctioning were made, although never substantiated.

For a number of years a minor problem was generated by small extreme right-wing groups, such as Westland New Post and Front de la Jeunesse. Some of the infiltrations by informants or members of the Security were put into question. A parliamentary inquiry followed.

Raes was pursued meanwhile by the baron Benoît de Bonvoisin, who accused him of being a KGB agent and of having wrongly accused the baron as an agitator of the extreme right. The different claims made by Bonvoisin remained unproven and lead to nothing.

With a sentence of November 10, 2009 Eric Van de Weghe and Christian Amory were condemned for having sold forged documents to de Bonvoisin, enabling him to claim that Raes was a KGB-agent. The judgment said: 'It is without doubt that the falsified documents were transmitted by de Bonvoisin to the Belgian police authorities with the purpose of harming Albert Raes'. De Bonvoisin was not condemned because serious health problems prevented him from appearing in court. Van den Weghe was condemned to 9 months imprisonment and Amory to two months.

As for the extreme left, the Security Services and Albert Raes had to fight the Cellules Communistes Combattantes (CCC) of Pierre Carette, which perpetrated bomb attacks resulting in 1984-1985 in two deaths and several severely injured victims. The secret services succeeded in arresting them and in making them condemned to long prison sentences.

At the end of his career, Raes was confronted with disputes about the Belgian stay-behind network, as a result of the dysfunction of parts of a similar organization in Italy. It appeared that in other countries, including Belgium, such dysfunctions had not taken place.

In June 1990, the then minister of Justice Melchior Wathelet removed Raes from the secret services and appointed him in the purely honorary function of deputy secretary general of the ministry of Justice.

The minister was however forced in 1993 by the Conseil d'Etat to appoint Raes in a function equivalent to his previous one, and he became director general for Legislation and Cults within the Ministry of Justice, remaining in this function until his retirement in 1997.

Of this removal, the former minister of Justice Jean Gol wrote: My successor sacrificed this high ranking civil servant ("ce grand commis") to a sort of "raison d'Etat", made out of a mixture of socialist rancour and the concern of protecting his own image. I had always refused to sanction the administrator-general, who was the victim of the gossip by journalists in pursuit of juicy scoops, by victims of a persecution complex, and by condemned criminals. Two parliamentary commissions and numerous judicial inquiries revealed nothing which could have tarnished the reputation of this public servant (Librement, p. 167).

== Honorary functions ==
Raes was a member of the board of the 'Carnegie Hero Fund'.

In 2000 he was made an honorary consul of Morocco for the Flemish region. From 2001 till 2011 he was vice-president of the consular corps in West-Flanders.

He is an honorary member of the Fraternelle des agents parachutists belges 1940-1945.

== Honours ==
Albert Raes was made:

- Commander of the Belgian Order of Leopold
- Commander of the Belgian Order of the Crown
- Grand Cross in the Royal Order of Alaouists (Morocco)
- Grand Cross in the Order of Merit (Spain)
- Grand Officer in the Order of the Finnish Lion (Finland)
- Grand Officer in the Order of Merit (Italy)
- Grand Officer in the Order of the Phoenix (Greece)
- Grand Officer in the Order of the Infant Dom Henrique, (Portugal)
- Grand Officer in the Order of Isabella the Catholic (Spain)
- Commander of the Légion d'Honneur (France)
- Commander of the Royal Order of the Pole Star (Sweden)
- Commander of the Order of Oranje-Nassau (the Netherlands)
- Commander of the Order of the Sacred Tresor (Japan)
- Commander of the Order of Merit (Germany)

== Literature and references ==
- Belgian senate, Parliamentary commission on private militia's, 1981
- Walter de Bock, e.a., Extreem-rechts en de Staat, EPO, Berchem, 1981
- René Haquin, Operatie Staatsveiligheid. De Staatsveiligheid en de WNP, EPO, Berchem, 1984
- Jean Mottard & René Haquin, Les Tueries du Brabant, Complexe, Brussels, 1990, ISBN 2-87027-351-7
- Chamber of Representatives, Parlementaire onderzoekscommissie Banditisme, 1990
- Belgian Senate, Parliamentary commission on Gladio, 1991
- Hugo Gijsels, Netwerk Gladio, Kritak, Leuven, 1991
- Jean Gol, Librement, Brussels, 1992
- Chamber of Representatives, Parlementaire onderzoekscommissie Bende van Nijvel, 1997
- Pierre Pean, Manipulations africaines - Qui sont les vrais coupables de l'attentat contre le vol UTA 772?, Paris, Plon, 2001
- Daniele Ganser, NATO's Secret Armies, Operation Gladio and Terrorism in Western Europe, London, Frank Cass, 2004.
- P. Ponsaers, M. Cools, K. Dassen, R. Libert, De Staatsveiligheid: essays over 175 jaar Veiligheid van de Staat, uitg. Politeia, 2005
