= Belgian stay-behind network =

Belgian covert military unit

The Belgian stay-behind network, colloquially called "Gladio" (meaning "sword"), was a secret mixed civilian and military unit, trained to form a resistance movement in the event of a Soviet invasion and part of a network of similar organizations in North Atlantic Treaty Organization states. It functioned from at least 1951 until 1990, when the Belgian branch was promptly and officially dissolved after its existence became publicly known following revelations concerning the Italian branch of the stay-behind network.

== History ==
The history of the Belgian branch of the Gladio network starts in 1948 when Prime Minister Paul-Henri Spaak and Minister of Justice Paul Struye gave the Staatsveiligheid (State Security Service) permission to discuss with allied intelligence services the organization of a clandestine stay-behind network. These negotiations mainly happened with Sir Stewart Menzies of the British SIS and representatives of the then freshly founded CIA. The explicit objectives of this collaboration were outlined in a top-secret letter from Menzies to Spaak:

The present object of [Anglo-Belgian co-operation between the special services] should be directed to two main aims:

1. The improvement of our information on the subject of Cominform and potential enemy activities in so far as they concern our two countries.
2. The preparation of appropriate intelligence and action organizations in the event of war.

— Sir Stewart Menzies, January 27, 1949

The amount of influence at this early stage, accredited to the CIA varies from source to source. CIA did not yet have full authority over the Office of Policy Coordination, which directed U.S. covert action until 1952. During the initial negotiations Menzies proposed to keep the US out of the organization, but Spaak objected to further developments not being in a tripartite (Belgium–Great-Britain–United States) or multilateral setting. In the final report of the parliamentary inquiry there is little mention of CIA involvement, but investigative journalist Walter de Bock points, based on Pentagon documents, at the CIA's significant early organizational role and de facto control until 1968. Similarly, Colonel Margot complains in an internal note, dated April 8, 1959, about the influence of the US intelligence services on the Belgian branch of the Gladio-network.

These initial negotiations led to closer collaboration between the three countries' secret services under the name Tripartite Meeting Belgium. Following this meeting, the Belgian stay-behind network became operational, but it was not until January 4, 1952, that the first formal instructions for stay-behind operations were issued to Ludovic Caeymaex (Staatsveiligheid) and General Etienne Baele.

Growing polarization between East and West and awareness of the need for continental collaboration led to the foundation in 1949 of the Comité Clandestin de l'Union Occidentale (C.C.U.O.), which contained Belgium, The Netherlands, Luxembourg, France and Great-Britain. The C.C.U.O. laid the base for the formation of the NATO and coordinated the various stay-behind networks in the five member countries. Its functions were transferred to the Clandestine Planning Committee (C.P.C.), another NATO-organization in 1951, which was renamed in to Coordination and Planning Committee in 1959. The C.P.C. elaborated a plan for installing two taskgroups, one for communications and one for secret networks, a structure reflected in the Allied Coordination Committee (A.C.C.) founded in 1958 to relieve the C.P.C. of some of its tasks.

The A.C.C. consisted of the members of the C.C.U.O. plus the US and coordinated the stay-behind activities, as was stipulated on its first meeting in April 1959 under French supervision:

The A.C.C. is a six-power regional committee for providing mutual consultation and developing policy guidance on matters of common interest regarding stay behind matters in the Western European countries concerned. [added emphasis]

— Declaration of principles, April 29–30, 1959

These interlocking coordination organizations, like the C.P.C. and A.C.C, were initially headquartered in Paris, but moved along with SHAPE, NATO's central headquarters, to Mons in Belgium after the French withdrawal from NATO's unified command structure in 1966. After the initial six counties, Germany, Italy, Denmark and Norway became members of the A.C.C.. Though all of the counties were members of NATO, an official link between the A.C.C and NATO was denied. The parliamentary committee noted "... one can not do away with the impression that in practice closer and closer relations did come to exist".

In the following decades the stay-behind activities were mainly coordinated through A.C.C.-meetings. These activities consisted officially of (multinational) training activities like infiltration, parachute jumping and long range communications, of which numerous were held at least between 1972 and 1989. Due to the secretive nature of the network, the milieu of various operatives involved and the Cold War setting, allegations were raised that the stay-behind network was during this time also at least indirectly involved with clandestine actions on Belgian soil. The last documented meeting of the A.C.C took place on 23 and 24 October 1990 under supervision of General Van Calster, where the participants discussed a.o. a scaling-back of the stay-behind network in light of changing international relations.

This was the meeting that Italian president Giulio Andreotti was referring to following the October 24, 1990 revelation of the existence of Gladio in Italy, a revelations several others governments' spokespersons reacted to by claiming that any stay-behind in their own country was history. This only exasperated Andreotti, who declared to the press that the last stay-behind meeting had taken place in Belgium a few days ago. After the exposure of the Italian branch and inquiries by Italian officials to their Belgian counterparts, Defense minister Guy Coëme and Prime Minister Wilfried Martens made the existence of the Belgian section of the Gladio-network public in a press meeting on November 7, 1990.

The government decided on November 23, 1990, a few days after the proposition for a parliamentary investigation to officially disband the network.

== Organization, activities and resources ==
The Belgian Gladio-branch consisted of two separate sections:

- S.D.R.A VIII (French: Service de Documentation, de Renseignments et d'Action VIII, "Documentation, Information and Action Service VIII"), residing under the military intelligence service, the Belgian General Information and Security Service (S.G.R) and thus the minister of Defense.
- S.T.C/Mob. (Dutch: Sectie training, communicatie en documentatie "Training, Communication and Documentation Service"), residing under the Staatsveiligheid and thus the minister of Justice.

S.D.R.A VIII was one of the sections of S.D.R.A (military security service), which in its turn is part of the S.G.R. (general military intelligence and security service). The S.G.R's functions are formally described in a decree from 1989 and are twofold: intelligence gathering and ensuring the security of military personnel and installations, issuing clearances, etc. The S.D.R.A is mandated with the second task, and is dived into functional sections: for instance, S.D.R.A III is contra-infiltration (for S.D.R.A XI, see further).

The members of S.D.R.A VIII were military personnel, trained in unorthodox warfare, combat and sabotage, parachute jumping and maritime operations. The operatives were trained to accompany the government abroad in case of a Soviet invasion, and then establish liaisons with the Belgian resistance movement and engage in warfare.

=== Oversight ===
During the parliamentary investigation, the committee stumbled by chance on the existence of the Coordination and Planning Committee secretariat, which formed S.D.R.A XI, but was funded through secret NATO payments. When Paul Detrembleur, former head of the S.D.R.A and last administrator of S.D.R.A XI/C.P.C.-secretariat, was called to testify before the parliamentary inquiry about the activities of this section about the Gladio-activities, he refused to divulge any information.

The final parliamentary report stressed the resulting incomplete insight into the functioning of the C.P.C. and its relation to S.D.R.A. VIII, which formally organized the military section of the Gladio network. The report noted that the C.P.C. was responsible for the relations between the Belgian secret services and the NATO high command (especially SHAPE), and that the witnesses denied being involved with stay-behind activities. The reason was, the latter claimed, that NATO was "forward defending"-oriented and thus not interested in stay-behind activities in countries like Belgium, which did not border Warsaw Pact-nations. The commission then further noted the discrepancy between these claims and given reason, and the fact that the C.P.C. co-coordinated the S.D.R.A. VIII and participated in the A.C.C.-meetings.

=== S.T.C/Mob. function and oversight ===
The civilian branch of the Belgian stay-behind had the mission to collect intelligence under conditions of enemy occupation which could be useful to the government and to organize secure communication routes to evacuate the members of the government and other people with official functions.

=== Military trainers/operatives and civilian operatives ===
- Recruitment (how, criteria)
- Training activities (joint international training/war games, sabotage, intelligence ....)
- Funding (equipment)
- Weapons, weapons-depots.

Both military intelligence and Staatsveiligheid maintained dossiers on Gladio training activities, of which incomplete versions were made available to the parliamentary committee. Events from the list of operations by the military branch was provided by Coëme and is denoted by A, while events from the list from the archives of the Staatsveiligheid (titled "Overzicht oefeningen in het kader ACC – periode 1980-1990") is denoted by B:

- (A) 1972: Training on clandestine techniques.
- (A) 1976: Training on radio-communications, intelligence, maritime operations, aerial operations and escape routes.
- (A) 1977: Training on optimizing techniques to locate downed pilots and the use of escape routes.
- (A) 1978: In-door training on clandestine missions.
- (A) 1980: Training on parachute-jumping, long-distance radio communication and clandestine techniques.
- (B) June 1980: OREGAN II
- (A) 1981: Lessons and training on clandestine activities.
- (A) 1983: Training on escape routes, intelligence, aerial operations and radio communications.
- (A) 1985: Six trainings (at least two outside Belgium, one in Belgium): infiltration a parachute-jumping, extracting material through escape routes.
- (A) 1986, 1987 & 1988: : Trainings outside Belgium on intelligence operations and radio communications.

Minister Melchior Wathelet testified before the parliamentary inquiry that secret weapon depots were created in the 1950s, of which a first one was discovered in 1957 due to a landslide, and a second one in 1959 by playing children. He further stated that after these discoveries it was decided to abandon the depots and transfer the weapons to a military depot. An inventory report, dated 1991, for the military section of Gladio mentions inflatable boats, video-equipment and around 300 weapons, including M1 carbines, MP40 submachine guns and "armes en cocon", weapons packaged for long-term storage.

== Parliamentary inquiry ==
=== Overview ===
After the existence of the Belgian branch of the Gladio-network became public, speculations and allegations about involvement of the Gladio-operatives in various high-profile and often unsolved crimes and terrorist acts during the 1980s began to appear in the media. To investigate these allegations and clarify the operation of the Belgian branch, a senatorial investigative commission was established on 20 December 1990. It was tasked with clarifying the structure, aims etc. of the network and the amount of oversight; which connections existed with domestic and foreign intelligence and police services; and whether there was a link with events previously examined in parliamentary inquiries or certain serious crimes and terrorist acts committed the previous decade.

Chairman senator Roger Lallemand

The commission convened from 16 January 1991 until 5 July 1991, during which fifty seven meetings were held and thirty seven witnesses were heard. Amongst those who testified before the commission were ministers Guy Coëme, Melchior Wathelet and Louis Tobback; former administrator-director-general of the Staatsveiligheid (77–90) and head of STC-MOB Albert Raes, Ludovic Caeymaex (administrator-general Staatsveiligheid 58–77); then current administrator-general of the Staatsveiligheid Stéphane Schewebach, Jacques Devlieghere (Staatsveiligheid 78–89, nr. 2); S.D.R.A.-operative André Moyen; Gladio-instructors Guibert Nieweling (code name "Addie"), Michel Huys ("Alain"), Etienne Annarts ("Stéphane").

=== Problems ===
The two major obstacles facing the commission of inquiry were firstly the secret nature of the case and the related unwillingness of witnesses in disclosing information and secondly time constraints.

Firstly, due to the nature of the case, and the various legal, professional and military requirements of confidentiality, the commission went to great lengths in limiting public access to discussed material. For instance, the parliament did forgo an earlier proposition for a parliamentary in favor for the proposition by Lallemand which included the requirement that the commission operated behind closed doors (in contravention to the regular parliamentary inquiry procedures). Lallemand placed also additional restriction on the ability to communicate with the press, handling of documents, etc. These restrictions were criticized both for being undemocratic, unnecessary or counter-productive and for not being strict enough.

The committee initially envisaged a solution whereby the names of the operatives were handed to three selected magistrates, familiar with the relevant unsolved criminal investigations. The relevant agencies and witnesses refused to do so, with the refusal varying from polite claims of forgetfulness or references to oaths of secrecy to outright hostility. This issue was compounded by the fact that records on former operatives were systematically purged and the magistrates were not up to date with more recent investigations. Gijsels noted that order... ?Names with the CIA/London? The final report then concluded that the cooperation from both the military and the Staatsveiligheid was generally satisfactory, but deplored the stubborn withholding of the names of civilian operatives. Parlementaire Commissie (1991), p. ?

Secondly, the commission faced time-related problems. The time allotted to the commission was initially five months, a period which the final report deplored as "very little" and short in comparison to other inquiries. The Senate granted on July 12, 1991, a request for extra time, which enabled the committee to work for another three months. Unfortunately most of the allotted time fell during the parliamentary recess, which further frustrated the effort to fully pursue the intended lines of inquiry. For instance, the commission had planned to interview several investigative journalists, people like Richard Brenneke and had requested several "dossiers chauds" (English: "hot cases").

=== Handled material and major findings ===
Handled material: Westmooreland, John Wood/Rudy Daems, ...

=== Conclusions and impact ===
Reactions & indirect effect inquiry: Comité-I. In 1995, the Belgian Chamber of Representatives organized a parliamentary inquiry into the effectiveness of the Belgian police and judiciary with regards to the Nijvel gang investigation. The conclusions of this inquiry, as well as the earlier Senate inquiry on SDRA8 and the Chamber inquiry on banditism, resulted in the preparation of new legislation governing the mission and methods of the Belgian State Security Service and Belgian General Information and Security Service, which was passed in 1998.

== Clandestine activities during the Cold War ==
=== Assassination of Julien Lahaut ===
In 1950, Julien Lahaut, chairman of the Communist Party of Belgium (PCB), was assassinated at his home in Seraing. This case had both national and international significance and Gladio's influence in it has long been suspected. Repeated requests have been made in the Belgian Chamber of Representatives for an investigation into Lahaut's death.

One of the murderers, Halle insurance agent François Goossens, was tracked and anonymously implied in a 1985 research work by Etienne Verhoeyen and Rudi Van Doorslaer of the CegeSoma. In 2002, senator Vincent Van Quickenborne publicly revealed the true identity of Goossens. In 2007, the identities of three additional perpetrators (all from Halle) were revealed through an episode of the television programme Keerpunt on the chain Canvas: Eugeen Devillé (25 at the time), his brother Alex (30) and their brother-in-law Jan Hamelrijck (24).

Subsequently, in 2015, another team of historians at the CegeSoma (led by Emmanuel Gerard) linked the murder to anti-communist and royalist elements inside the General Information and Security Service, with André Moyen as a key figure in the network that Goossens worked for. This clandestine intelligence group, which apparently thought of itself as a stay-behind network, had direct ties to the official police services. Moyen was furthermore supported by prominent Belgian corporations and financial institutions including the Société Générale, the Union Minière and Brufina. His network was allowed to set up its headquarters free of charge in a building owned by the Union Minière in the center of Brussels, and intelligence reports by Moyen were shared both with the official military intelligence services and with the companies that supported him.

The researchers uncovered a secret August 1950 note from Moyen (shared with minister Albert de Vleeschauwer among others). In it, he defends the "execution" of Lahaut as a "necessary measure" because the Belgian government was supposedly not taking sufficient action against the perceived fifth column which the communists constituted. The researchers state that Moyen was implementing a strategy of tension as he hoped that violence and instability would lead to the creation of an authoritarian right-wing regime. However, Moyen had already died in 2008 and no one was ever put on trial for the murder.

=== Attempted coup d'état ===
A September 10, 1973, note from the Belgian Brigade de Surveillance et de Renseignement intelligence agency described the organization of a coup d'état by certain "financial networks and far-right organizations", naming among others Emile Lecerf, boss of the Nouvelle Europe magazine (NEM) and political godfather of Francis Dossogne (future leader of far-right Front de la Jeunesse - FJ) and Paul Latinus, founder of the Westland New Post extremist group, in which Gladio's influence has been suspected, although ultimately never proved in justice. Paul Latinus would escape to Pinochet's Chile for a few months in 1981, before committing suicide in 1984. On the other hand, Emile Lecerf was also a member of the Jeune Europe far-right group.

=== Brabant killers, 1980s ===
In 1985, articles in the Belgian press suggested that the Belgian stay-behind network S.D.R.A VIII, the Belgian Gendarmerie, the Belgian paramilitary far-right group Westland New Post, and the American Defense Intelligence Agency (DIA) had conspired to engage in a series of violent attacks ascribed to the Brabant killers. Although a parliamentary inquiry did not find any proof of such a conspiracy, the case of the Brabant killers did lead to the creation of the Permanent Committee of Surveillance of Intelligence Agencies.

== Le Soir controversy ==
In 1996, Le Soir newspaper caused a public uproar by revealing the existence of a classified document, dated August 1995, and titled "Plan de base de la défense militaire du territoire" ("Basic plan for the military defense of the territory"). The newspaper quoted some passages of what it called a "racist plan": "Many immigrant communities now populate large urban areas. Should these population groups ever adopt a position that is in strong disagreement with Belgian policies, they could launch actions intended to counteract these policies or to make their concerns known ... In our estimation there is no open threat in Belgium ... But there is a permanent, clandestine threat" (French: "Nombre de communautés immigrées se sont fixées dans les grandes agglomérations. Si ces groupes de population devaient entrer clairement en désaccord avec la politique belge, ils pourraient déclencher des actions visant à contrarier cette politique ou visant à faire connaître leur mécontentements ... Nous considérons qu'il n'existe aucune menace ouverte en Belgique ... Mais il existe bien une menace clandestine avec un caractère permanent" - sic).

The dissolved SDRA-8 had been replaced by the "Commandement territorial interforces" (CTI), a military intelligence agency organized by provinces and essentially composed of about a thousand reserve officers. Its goal was to infiltrate civil society and find informants, with the mission to be especially concerned by the "immigrant communities which represented a permanent clandestine threat". According to Le Soir, if the CTI is not closely linked to the military agency Service Général du Renseignement et de la Sécurité (SGRS), then it is "nothing else than a new structure of military intelligence... particularly suspicious of anything that is foreign to it".

Defense minister Poncelet replied in the Belgian Senate that the plan was only an internal draft proposal, which was never approved by the military command or the defense minister himself.

Finally, the activities of the Belgian military intelligence agencies prompted the Parliamentary Committee of Surveillance (Comité R) to investigate various abusive wiretappings. "The central documentation of the SGR is composed of 450 000 files", stated Le Soir.

== BBET, 2006 ==
The arrest by police of members of far-right group Bloed, Bodem, Eer en Trouw in September 2006 led to the Belgian press recalling the "Bloody Eighties", which were marred by the violent attacks of the Brabant killers leaving twenty-eight dead and the bombings carried out by the communist organization Communist Combatant Cells which caused two deaths. According to Justice Minister Laurette Onkelinx and Interior Minister Patrick Dewael, the suspects (11 of whom were members of the military) were preparing terrorist attacks in order to "destabilize" Belgium.

== See also ==
- Operatiën & Inlichtingen, Dutch equivalent
- Bloed, Bodem, Eer en Trouw
- Brabant killers (also known as the Nijvel gang)
- Gladio
- Jeune Europe
- Operation Condor
- Westland New Post
- Marc Dutroux
