= Alexandre Galopin =

Belgian businessman (1879–1944)

- Portrait of Alexandre Galopin
- Born: Alexandre Marie Albert Galopin; 26 September 1879; Ghent, East Flanders, Belgium
- Died: 28 February 1944 (aged 64); Etterbeek, Brussels, Belgium
- Occupation: Businessman
- Known for: Galopin Doctrine
- Relatives: Benoît de Bonvoisin (grandson)

Alexandre Galopin, born on 26 September 1879 in Ghent and assassinated at his home in Etterbeek on 28 February 1944, had been governor of the Société Générale de Belgique, since March 1935, a major Belgian company, and chairman of the board of the motor and armaments company Fabrique Nationale d'Armes de Guerre (FN).

He is regarded as a prominent figure of Belgian business leadership in the first half of the 20th century.

A civil engineer by training, and head of the general management of the "Fabrique Nationale" (FN) in Herstal (Liège) before 1914, he plays a crucial role in Paris during the First World War, in the standardized production of armaments—chiefly rifles—for the French and Belgian armies.

As an economic adviser to the Belgian government at the end of the war, he takes part in preparing and implementing the policy for reviving Belgian industry after 1918.

In 1919, he is among the Belgian experts involved in the negotiations of the Treaty of Versailles, which brings an end to the First World War. He represents the Belgian central bank at the "Banque des Règlements Internationaux" (BRI), established in 1930 in Basel.

Galopin is renowned for his role during the Second World War as head of the "Comité Galopin", entrusted on 15 May 1940 with a "mission of confidence" by the Belgian government shortly before its departure for England. In this capacity, he plays a central part in shaping the economic and financial policy of occupied Belgium in the face of the Nazi regime.

In February 1944, Governor Galopin is assassinated at the request of Himmler, head of the SS.

After 1945, the decisions taken by Alexandre Galopin and his circle under Nazi occupation become the subject of judicial and historiographical debate.

== Early years ==
Alexandre Galopin was born in Ghent, East Flanders in Belgium on 28 September 1879. Galopin comes from an intellectual family; his father having served first as professor of civil law and later as rector of the State University of Liège. There, he pursues studies in civil engineering, which he completes with distinction in 1902, before adding further training in Berlin, London, and Paris. He speaks both English and German.

Returning to Liège in 1904, he joins the "Fabrique Nationale d'Armes de Guerre" (FN), where, at his own request, he spends two years working alongside the labour force as a machine-tool fitter and industrial draughtsman. From the outset of his career, Galopin shows sensitivity to the workers' conditions. He distinguishes himself through his organizational talents and equips FN with a state-of-the-art laboratory. In 1913, he becomes the company's general director.

On the eve of the outbreak of war, FN produces not only hunting rifles but also weapons of war, ammunition, bicycles, motorcycles, automobiles, and trucks. Galopin plays a central role in this industrial diversification.

== The First World War and exile in France ==
The German invasion of Belgium beginning on 2 August 1914 quickly places the Liège region at the mercy of the invader. Because of the strategic nature of the production, the FN board of directors decides to halt operations and close the factories. The German occupier places FN under sequestration and transfers its machine tools to German arsenals.

Galopin goes to Antwerp, where the Belgian army is regrouping and establishing a national stronghold. He then moves on to Le Havre, the city where the Belgian government has settled, and places himself at its disposal.

Meanwhile, the French government designates the socialist Albert Thomas as the organizer of military equipment production. Named Deputy Secretary of State for Artillery and Ammunition, he negotiates with the Belgian Prime Minister Charles de Broqueville the assignment of Galopin for the benefit of the French war effort. In exchange for the delivery of 15,000 rifles to the Belgian army stationed on the Yser, the Belgian government agrees to it.

Minister Thomas entrusts Galopin with the coordination of all light armament production by the French factories scattered across the country. Drawing inspiration from Taylorism, a North American method in vogue in the 1900s, Galopin implements a rigorous standardization of rifle part machining among the various factories, requiring only final assembly work. The “Galopin method” greatly increases productivity and makes it possible to deliver, within short deadlines, the essential armaments needed at the front. Galopin is then entrusted, with the support of Winston Churchill (British Minister of Munitions in 1917–1918), with applying the same method to the production of machine gun parts. And, from 1917, Galopin is entrusted with the mission of standardizing the production of aircraft engines.

At the end of the conflict, Alexandre Galopin is decorated with the Legion of Honour by the French government in recognition of his services.

== The interwar period 1919-1939 ==
International negotiations: the Treaty of Versailles and the "Banque des Règlements Internationaux" (BRI)

At the end of the war, Galopin actively participates in the 'Consultative Committee' created in October 1917 in Paris by the Minister of Economic Affairs, Paul Hymans, who is responsible for planning Belgium's post-war economic policy and preparing the peace negotiations.

Appointed to the post of Minister of Foreign Affairs, Paul Hymans calls on Galopin to join the Belgian delegation at the peace conference sitting in Versailles in 1919.

Galopin involves himself in economic and financial matters, notably concerning the Belgian reparations to be claimed from defeated Germany.

As Regent of the "Banque Nationale de Belgique" (BNB), Galopin takes part in the meetings of the "Banque des Règlements Internationaux" (BRI) in Basel, which in the 1930s becomes a forum for consultation among central banks.

Industrial restructuring and reconstruction

At the end of the conflict, Galopin returns to Herstal as managing director and administrator of FN. The German shareholders are removed in favour of a Belgian anchoring. Galopin drives the development of the "engines" division, seeking to diversify the company's outlets following the decline in arms sales. He recruits a new wave of engineers and technicians and creates, within FN, a vocational training school as early as 1921. Galopin equips FN with new machine tools, enabling the standardization of parts and an increase in productivity.

The "Société Générale de Belgique" (SGB), the country's principal holding company, has been the majority shareholder of FN since 1919. Galopin is called by Governor Jean Jadot to join the management of SGB. He entrusts him with the reorganization and modernization of the Belgian coal industry, a sector dominated by SGB. To remedy the weak competitiveness of the Borinage coal mines, Galopin restructures the operating sites and creates an industrial complex in Hainaut. The valorization of coal is promoted through the establishment of the companies "Carbonisation centrale" and "Carbochimique." Beyond the rationalization of production, Galopin promotes the cartelization of the coal industry in agreement with Evence III Coppée, who represents the interests of the "Banque de Bruxelles" in the sector. Galopin remains one of the principal decision makers in the Belgian coal industry, and this continues until his death in 1944.

Galopin represents SGB in numerous industrial enterprises, primarily in the metallurgical sector, including "S.A. John Cockerill" and "La Providence." He remains managing director of FN until 1932. In 1932, Galopin becomes vice-governor of SGB. In March 1935, he succeeds Emile Francqui as governor of SGB, a holding company that at the time controls nearly 30% of the Belgian economy. In this capacity, he chairs both the executive committee and the board of directors.

Following the lessons drawn from the 1929 crash on the New York Stock Exchange, the Belgian legislator separates holding-company activities from deposit banking. Galopin is also appointed to preside over the "Banque de la Société Générale" between 1935 and 1939. In this capacity, he becomes involved in negotiations with the Minister of Finance, Max-Léo Gérard, concerning monetary reform. He thwarts the Socialist Party's plan to establish control over holding companies.

As a member of the "permanent committee" of the "Société nationale des chemins de fer belges" (SNCB) between 1926 and 1935, he initiates an internal system of social insurance and organizes joint relations with the trade unions. He also becomes involved in the "Fonds national de la recherche scientifique" (FNRS), founded in 1928, where he promotes the interconnection between industry and universities.

== World War II ==
Under Galopin's impetus, SGB takes measures to safeguard its interests on the eve of the outbreak of the Second World War. Significant capital is transferred abroad, notably to the Congo and to the United States. The governor proposes to remain in occupied Belgium, while administrators with full powers are appointed outside the national territory, particularly to ensure the management of subsidiaries located in the Belgian Congo. Galopin, together with the management of SGB, is fully aware of the strategic importance of Congolese uranium owned by the "Union Minière du Haut Katanga" (UMHK). Edgar Sengier, director of both SGB and UMHK, is chosen by the SGB board of directors and, endowed with broad management mandates, leaves to settle in New York. In 1938, Sengier orders that half of the uranium stock in the Congo be transferred to a warehouse at the port of New York. These uranium reserves are later made available to the U.S. Army by him, enabling the production of the first atomic bombs.

Leader of the policy of "presence" in the face of the Nazi occupier

Belgium was invaded by Nazi Germany on 10 May 1940. On the eve of its departure from Brussels, the Belgian government, represented by Ministers Paul-Henri Spaak and Camille Gutt, summons business leaders on 15 May 1940. At this meeting, the bankers Galopin (SGB), Max-Léo Gérard (Banque de Bruxelles), and Fernand Collin (Kredietbank) are informed that the government, in view of the German advance, wishes to keep trusted officials in occupied Belgium who will closely follow events and provide advice. In response to a question from Galopin, Spaak and Gutt acknowledge that concessions may be granted to the occupier in the economic sphere, in order to ensure the survival of the country. The bankers receive from the government a "mission of trust" of a general nature, accompanied by a specific mission consisting in ensuring the payment of the salaries of state employees. To this end, Gutt entrusts Galopin with a blank Treasury bond, intended to cover the financial commitments of the banks in the name of the Belgian state. The protagonists are unaware of the subsequent, unpredictable events: the capitulation of France, Leopold III's decision to remain in occupied Belgium, the departure of part of the government to London, and so on.

Mandated by the government-in-exile, the bankers gather around Governor Galopin in an informal committee nicknamed the "Comité Galopin". During the first months of the Occupation, the "Comité Galopin" plays a crucial role in restoring transport, logistics (post, telegraph, and telephone), and distribution networks (electricity, coal, gas, water), in order to curb mass unemployment and revive economic activity. From mid-June 1940, a public company, the PTT announces the resumption of its activities in postal, telegraphic, and telephone communications. Galopin urges the restoration of railway traffic by the SNCB. The ministerial departments directed by the general secretaries continue to function normally. The objective is not only to restart the Belgian economy, but also to prevent German control over all strategic networks, which Governor Galopin and his entourage seek to keep in Belgian hands.

However, Article 115 of the Penal Code prohibits providing the enemy with "assistance in soldiers, money, provisions, weapons, and ammunition." This article, already present in the French Penal Code of 1810, proves inadequate in the face of the challenges of the Second World War, which is characterized by a total war involving civilian populations. Prominent jurists are consulted: Antoine Ernst de Bunswyck (Secretary-General of the Ministry of Justice), Paul Struye, Paul Veldekens, and Raoul Hayoit de Termicourt. They conclude that a "state of necessity" exists, linked to the essential supply of seven million Belgians. Moreover, a German ordinance makes economic recovery and the restarting of industry compulsory, while prohibiting strikes and unemployment.

After multiple consultations with university experts (among them eminent economists and jurists such as Léon-Hugo Dupriez, Henri Velge, and Charles De Visscher), with representative employer circles, and with the higher civil service (notably the secretaries general in charge of ministries in Brussels), Galopin sets out a series of principles regarding the "policy of presence" to be maintained in relations with the occupier, particularly in the field of industrial supplies. These principles are stated in a memorandum of July 1940, later supplemented and adapted by those of June 1941 and June 1942. The supply of arms and munitions is prohibited, investments aimed at increasing production are avoided, agreements with German companies are not authorized, exceptional profits are not permitted, dismissals must be avoided in order to prevent the deportation of workers to Germany, and so forth.

The campaign against the USSR, launched in June 1941, compels the Reich to declare total war, involving a massive economic mobilization of the occupied countries in favour of the war effort, under the direction of Albert Speer, appointed by Hitler in February 1942 as head of the Ministry of Armaments. German pressure on Belgium intensifies, deteriorating the occupier's relations with Belgian business circles. Belgian industry is placed under heavy demand until 1944, a year in which coal shortages and the disorganization of the railway network hinder productivity and export capacities. It is therefore external factors, linked to the radicalization of the Nazi regime and the intensification of its war effort, which accounts for the scale of the plundering and the deliveries made to the enemy, phenomena fueled in particular by the expansion of the black market

Belgian supplies to the enemy are deliberately of poor quality. Galopin, together with the entire "patriotic" employer class, often in agreement with trade union organizations, seeks to sabotage Belgian production destined for Nazi Germany. In the factories, engineers and workers deliberately slow down production to the greatest extent possible; the level of productivity declines sharply despite the abundance of labour. Supervisory staff and workers contrive to manufacture parts and products that break down within a reasonable period after their delivery to the enemy (in order to avoid reprisals and suspicion).

Within the framework of the "policy of presence," discreet instructions are given to Belgian companies to reduce productivity as much as possible. The general directive is to work slowly and poorly on products destined for Germany. Output in the coal industry, partly controlled by the SGB and the holdings represented in the "Comité Galopin", is intentionally mediocre. Production rates in the steel industry barely reach 40 percent of the prewar level. Minor acts of sabotage, calculation errors, missed orders, and faulty adjustments serve to reduce and spread out production.

In a letter dated 22 February 1941 addressed to Félicien Cattier, vice-governor of the SGB while passing through Lisbon, Minister C. Gutt reiterates the government's agreement on the necessity of working in order to eat. However, from the summer of 1942 onward, under British pressure—Winston Churchill foremost—the Pierlot government can no longer endorse the "policy of the lesser evil" embodied by the "Comité Galopin" and begins to distance itself. The Belgian authorities seek to restore their credibility with the Allies, which has been largely tarnished by the political events in Belgium during the summer of 1940. That said, the government, having been away from the country for four years, is scarcely aware of the concrete repercussions linked to the constraints of Nazi occupation, as Resistance organizations frequently point out in their reports sent to London.

His role in the supply of occupied Belgium

One of the principal concerns of the committee chaired by Galopin is to ensure the food supply of occupied Belgium. Indeed, before 1940, one third of the Belgian population's food was provided through imports. The memory of the First World War remains vivid in people's minds. Belgium had then been supplied by the "Commission for Relief in Belgium," a humanitarian organization founded under the aegis of the United States and directed by Herbert Hoover.

Between 1940 and 1944, large-scale supplies from abroad are no longer possible, as Winston Churchill, determined to maintain a strict continental blockade against the countries occupied by Nazi Germany, is firmly opposed to them, believing that part of the humanitarian aid would be diverted by the Germans.

In matters of provisioning the country, Galopin realizes, as early as the summer of 1940, that Belgium can no longer rely on a repetition of the conditions that prevailed during the First World War, given the British determination to uphold the continental blockade: Belgium can no longer count on international food aid.

Deficient in its agricultural production and unable to provide for its population, the "Comité Galopin" regards exports to Nazi Germany, in exchange for the importation of foodstuffs, as a necessity. The Belgian government in exile, first in France and then in London—particularly Minister C. Gutt—supports this policy. At the end of the war, however, the bilateral deficit in Belgian-German trade reflects the extent of the country's plunder organized by the Nazi regime, including through the black market.

The policy of presence nevertheless prevented the outbreak of famine in Belgium, as was the case in other regions occupied in Europe.

The covert financial support to the Resistance and to the victims of Nazism

Governor Galopin is one of the leaders of passive, intelligent, and effective resistance against the Nazi occupier.

From the second half of 1940, at the instigation of Galopin and his entourage, discreet and oral instructions are given to company directors to hire unemployed workers en masse, even those without qualifications, thereby preventing their deportation to Germany under the system of voluntary labour and, later, compulsory labour. This constitutes a deliberate act of passive resistance orchestrated by the business community, intended to thwart the occupier's recruitment efforts. Job openings are also created in large numbers within public institutions and parastatal organizations.

On 28 June 1940, the banks represented within the "Comité Galopin" decide to create a cooperative society, the "Caisse d'avances et de prêts" (CAP). This body, chaired by the jurist Henri Velge, grants financial assistance notably to civil servants, officers, members of parliament, university professors, and magistrates removed from their functions by the occupier, while avoiding the direct involvement of the banks in this support. Through this mechanism, professors of the "Université Libre de Bruxelles" (ULB), diplomats and senior civil servants deprived of their positions, parliamentarians deprived of their allowances, and members of the Court of Audit receive allocations. Likewise, journalists who have laid down their pens, dismissed gendarmes, families of soldiers, colonials, and boatmen (whose spouses are interned in Germany or exiled in an Allied country) benefit from aid. Members of the staff of the SNCB, the RTT, municipalities, and others are also included. However, the financial subsidy in favour of the magistracy, covered financially by the Belgian government in London, leads to an intervention by the occupier, who dissolves the CAP by ordinance on 12 August 1942.

During the second half of the war, the "Comité Galopin" devises more subtle means of assistance for civil servants and for personalities who have been sidelined. The aid also extends to Jews and to those refusing compulsory labour. Galopin entrusts Vice-Governor Gaston Blaise with the organization of the financing, which is supplied through the sale of coal on the black market by several subsidiaries of the SGB. After the Liberation, the financial commitments of the banks will be covered by means of the famous blank Treasury Bond handed by Gutt to Galopin on 15 May 1940.

In the summer of 1942, the Belgian government creates a clandestine political committee intended to represent it before the Resistance organizations and to gather sensitive political information on occupied Belgium. Parallel to the "Comité Galopin", the "Comité Gilles" is chaired by the jurist Charles De Visscher. Relations between the "Comité Galopin" and the "Comité Gilles" are maintained through personal contacts between their two presidents, Galopin and De Visscher. The memoranda drafted by Governor Galopin for London are, moreover, known to the Gilles Committee.

The Attempt to Maintain the Monetary and Financial Autonomy of Occupied Belgium

At the dawn of 1940, Alexandre Galopin is clearly marked by the monetary and financial catastrophe that Belgium experienced during the First World War and by its postwar consequences. His attitude during the Second World War is shaped by the determination to avoid at all costs a repetition of the dramatic situation that Belgium had endured in the decade of the 1910s.

By order of the Belgian government, the governor of the "Banque Nationale de Belgique" (BNB) leaves Brussels following the German invasion. The entirety of the bank's gold reserves had already been evacuated before the war to the Allied countries (France, Great Britain, and the United States). The German occupier insists that the BNB resume its activities, but without success. Galopin wishes to prevent a decision by the occupier to circulate on a large scale occupation currency of the German army, the Reichskreditkassenscheine. In this scenario, the Belgian authorities would no longer be in control of monetary creation, with all the abuses that such a situation could entail on the part of the occupier. The monetary and financial catastrophe suffered by Belgium during the Great War and in its aftermath leads Galopin to support the establishment of an issuing institute parallel to the BNB, placed under the control of Belgian financial actors. After arduous negotiations with the German authorities, an ordinance of 27 June 1940 authorizes the institution of an Issuing Bank in Brussels, independent of the BNB. By the end of 1940, Nazi Germany integrates Belgium's financial transactions into a multilateral clearing system on the scale of occupied Europe, overseen by the Deutsche Verrechnungskasse (DVK) in Berlin.

Despite the growth of industrial exports directed toward Germany, food imports remain below the needs of the population. During the winter of 1940–1941, supply difficulties are felt especially in urban areas and among disadvantaged groups. The credit balance of the Issuing Bank with the DVK in Berlin increases considerably, due to the imbalance of trade in favour of Germany. The Issuing Bank increasingly serves to finance exports destined for Germany, which is not the original objective of its founders. Fiduciary circulation expands in occupied Belgium because the Issuing Bank settles the claims of Belgian exporters by means of francs issued by the BNB, thereby stimulating inflation.

Relations with the Belgian Government in Exile and the Preparation for the Postwar Period

In mid-1941, with the Belgian government in exile now recognized by the Allies and established in London, and with the prospect of an Allied victory no longer to be dismissed, Governor Galopin increasingly turns his attention to preparing for the post-war period. During the meeting of the "Comité Galopin" on April 1, 1941, the examination of the consequences of maintaining industrial activity for post-war Belgium shows that the possibility of an Allied victory is now taken into account. A new doctrinal note, drafted by Galopin in June 1941 and transmitted to the Belgian government in London, places production policy within the perspective of preserving social peace and Belgium's competitive position in the post-war era.

In November 1941, the "Comité Galopin" approves the creation and funding of the "Groupement d'études économiques" (GEE), a clandestine body operating under the intelligence service "Zéro," responsible for coordinating post-war economic and financial planning for occupied Belgium. In February 1942, in a memorandum, Galopin considered it necessary to limit most of the studies to the period immediately following the liberation of the territory, with the aim of ensuring the stabilization and rapid recovery of the Belgian economy. The studies, in his view, are meant to serve as a basis for negotiations on the economic dimension of an armistice or of a future peace. Reports from the GEE are regularly transmitted to London by the Belgian intelligence services. The GEE thus provides opinions on negotiations for the creation of the Benelux Union, the re-establishment of the "Union Economique et Monétaire Belgo-Luxembourgeoise" (UEBL), the future of Germany, transport policy, agricultural policy, coal policy, and so on. Galopin himself drafts notes on these subjects, in response to questionnaires sent from London. His opinions are taken into account by the Belgian authorities in London.

Assassination of a major business leader

1944 is synonymous with settling scores. The final months of the occupation of Belgium are marked by numerous acts of violence. Prominent figures, often threatened and warned by the Resistance, leave their homes and take refuge in the countryside.

In Germany, the SS seizes power at the expense of the Wehrmacht. Himmler, dissatisfied with the passive resistance of the Belgian economy to the demands of the war effort and intent on sidelining the German military administration in Brussels in favour of a Nazi civil administration, looks for scapegoats. Governor Galopin, as a leading figure of the Belgian establishment, is among those targeted for elimination.

On Himmler's orders, the SS commander in Belgium and Northern France, Richard Jungclaus, issue instructions to the Flemish collaborationist movement Devlag, where the Flemish Belgian Robert Jan Verbelen, a member of the SS, is tasked with organizing a punitive expedition in Brussels. Four members of the militia are selected to go to Governor Galopin's residence on 28 February 1944, around 8:30 p.m. They fire at point-blank range at Galopin, who dies a few hours later in hospital from loss of blood.

A nuanced assessment

The Belgian government, led by Socialist Prime Minister Achille Van Acker and aware of the need to revive the economy, approves an interpretation of the Penal Code (based on Article 115) through a decree law of 25 May 1945, aligning itself with the position taken by Galopin and his colleagues. Only those companies that fail to comply with the rules of conduct adopted by the "Comité Galopin" as early as the summer of 1940, and revised and c.larified up until 1942, are to be prosecuted for economic collaboration.

In April 1948, the government led by Socialist Prime Minister Paul-Henri Spaak posthumously awards Galopin the distinction of Grand Officer of the Crown. A gesture intended to promote national reconciliation. For services rendered to the country, he is also granted the Civic Cross, First Class, 1940–1945. A recurring challenge to the orientations of the economic and financial policy pursued under the Occupation comes from the communist ideological movement. The Belgian Communist Party is in fact excluded from the Belgian government following the outbreak of the Cold War in 1948. The "royal question" fosters the polarization of Belgian public opinion on the eve of 1950, a year marked by the outbreak of the Korean War. In this tense ideological context, the figure of Governor Galopin, along with those of other leading industrialists, is instrumentalized by the communists to denounce the country's political and economic elites. This movement is at the origin of the term "doctrine Galopin."

These immediate post-war controversies explain why Belgian historiography has long focused on Belgium's contribution to the German economy within the framework of the "production policy," intended to feed the population, to the point of not sufficiently taking into account the evolution of external factors over which the "Comité Galopin" has no control (the evolution of the Nazi regime, the position of the Belgian government in London toward the Allies, etc.). The concomitant policy of industrial sabotage is little emphasized, as is Galopin's outstanding contribution to post-war preparation, both during the First and Second World Wars.

It is undeniable that the "Belgian economic miracle," already perceptible in 1946 thanks to the rapid revival of industrial activity and the expansion of Belgium's exports, owes much to the preservation of the entrepreneurial fabric promoted by Governor Galopin and his circle during the Occupation.

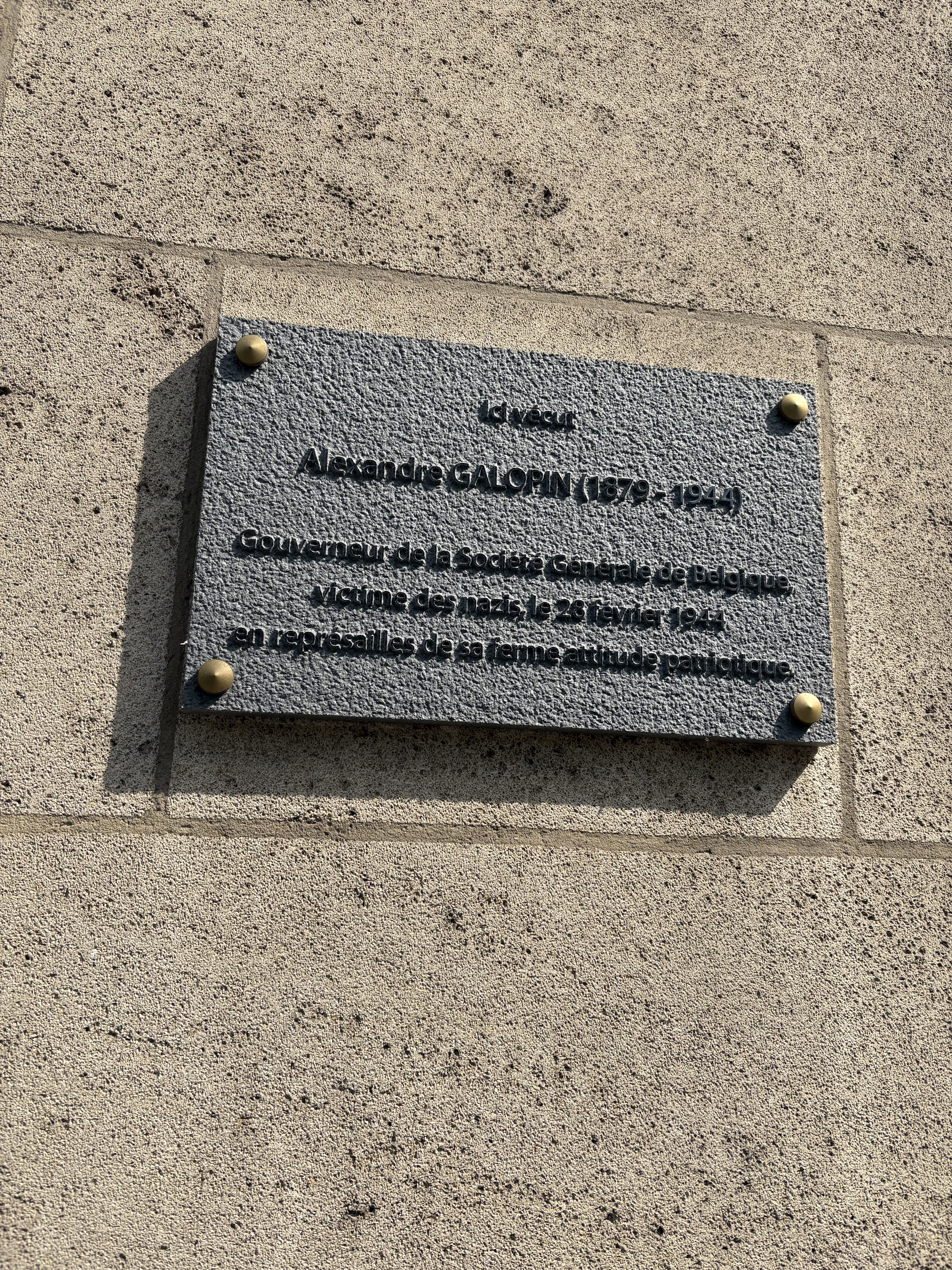
Commemorative plaque for Alexandre Galopin, on the house where he was killed.

== See also ==
- Committee of Secretaries-General
- Social Pact
- Strike of the 100,000
