= IETF Administrative Oversight Committee =

- Abbreviation: IAOC
- Formation: 2005
- Dissolved: 2018
- Type: oversight body
- Legal status: Defunct
- Purpose: Oversight of administrative and financial operations supporting the Internet Engineering Task Force
- Region served: Worldwide
- Main organ: IETF Administrative Support Activity (IASA)
- Parent organization: Internet Society
- Affiliations: Internet Engineering Task Force (IETF); Internet Architecture Board (IAB); Internet Engineering Steering Group (IESG)
- Website: iaoc.ietf.org

The IETF Administrative Oversight Committee (IAOC) was a governance body that oversaw the administrative and financial operations supporting the Internet Engineering Task Force (IETF). It existed from 2005 until 2018, when its functions were replaced by a new structure. Before this reform, administrative support for the IETF was handled more informally through the Internet Society (ISOC) and contractors. As the IETF grew, a more structured oversight mechanism was considered necessary.

The IAOC was created in 2005 as part of the reforms introduced by RFC 4071, which established the IETF Administrative Support Activity (IASA). The goal was to provide clearer governance and accountability for the administrative side of the IETF, things like contracts, meeting logistics, finances, and support staff.

In 2018, the structure was reformed by RFC 8711, which replaced the IASA/IAOC model with the IETF Administration LLC, a separate legal entity responsible for the IETF’s administrative and operational functions. As part of this transition, the IAOC was dissolved and its responsibilities were transferred to the board and staff of the IETF Administration LLC.

== Chairs ==
The IAOC Chairperson was selected by the IAOC members for a 1-year renewable term.

- Lucy Lynch (2006-2007)
- Kurtis Lindqvist (2007-2008)
- Jonne Soininen (2008-2009)
- Bob Hinden (2009-2014)
- Chris Griffiths (2013-2014)
- Tobias Gondrom (2015-)
