= Belgian General Information and Security Service =

Military intelligence agency

Algemene Dienst Inlichting en Veiligheid - Service Général du Renseignement et de la Sécurité
- ADIV/SGRS
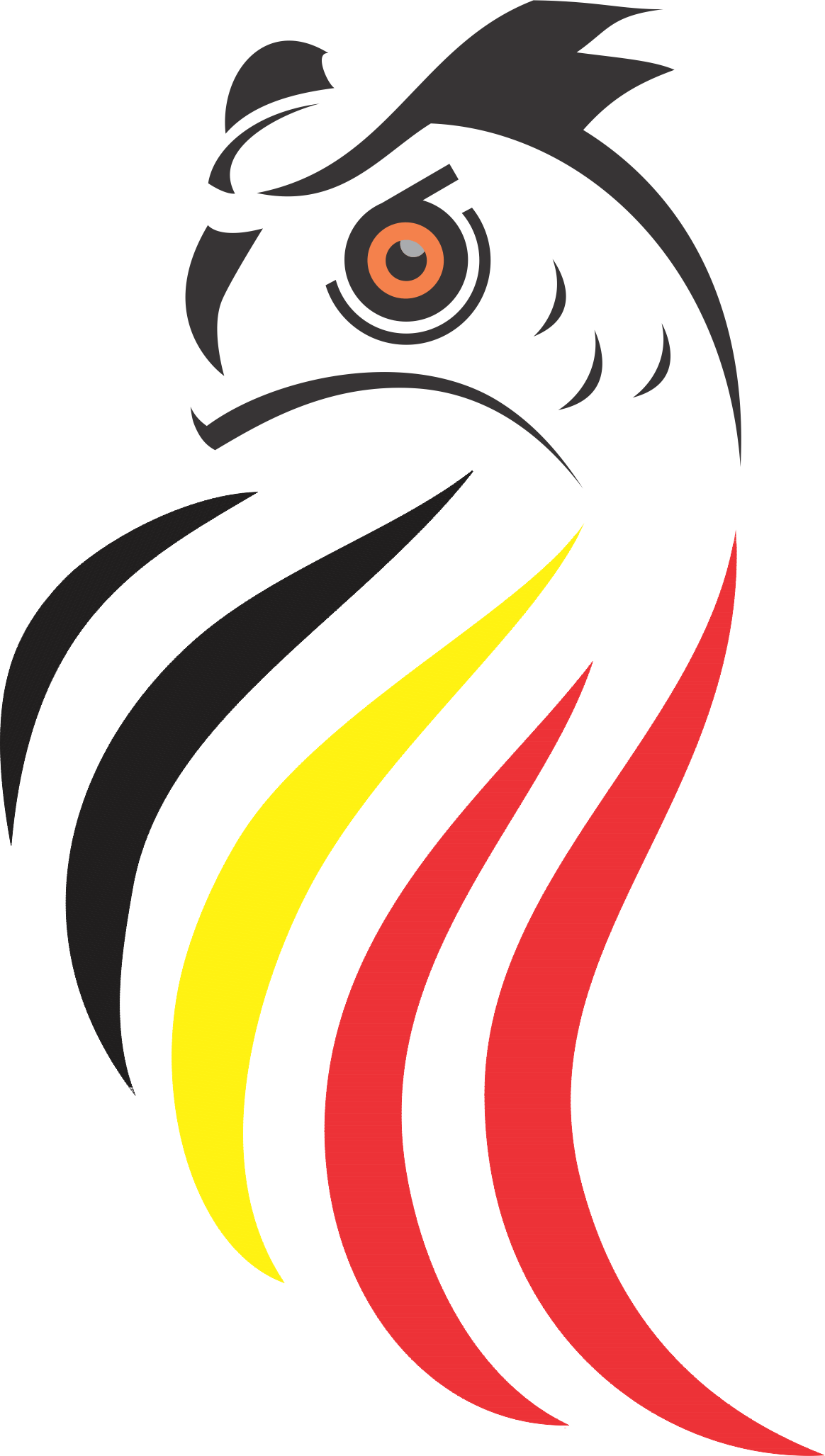

Agency overview
- Formed: 1915
- Headquarters: Evere, Belgium
- Employees: > 900
- Annual budget: € 50 million
- Agency executive: General-major Stéphane Dutron, Assistant Chief of Staff Intelligence and Security (ACOS-IS)
- Parent agency: Ministry of Defence

The General Intelligence and Security Service (GISS), known in Dutch as Algemene Dienst Inlichting en Veiligheid (ADIV), and in French as Service Général du Renseignement et de la Sécurité (SGRS) is the Belgian military intelligence service under responsibility of the Minister of Defence. It is one of two Belgian intelligence services, together with the civilian Belgian State Security Service (VSSE).

The military head of the GISS is also called the Assistant Chief of Staff Intelligence and Security (ACOS IS), which is part of the Defense Staff of the Belgian military. General-major Stéphane Dutron is the current chief, appointed in 2023.

== History ==
Belgian military intelligence has antecedents going back to the foundation of the Belgian Army in 1830, but the current service traces its establishment to 1915 at the front during World War I. It was then referred to, like its immediate predecessor of 1910, as the 2nd Bureau of the General Staff (2me Bureau de Renseignement) It was charged with counterespionage and the internal security of the Belgian Army. During World War I the service undertook the army's intelligence operations and coordinated resistance activities behind enemy lines. After the Armistice the service was responsible for the security of the Belgian troops participating in the occupation of the Rhineland. In 1923 it was involved in the attempted Rhineland independence coup. With its counterespionage tasks the 2nd Bureau entered into a rivalry with the civilian State Security Service. But a scandal caused by the bureau's forging of military plans against Holland and Germany, in what was intended as an active measure against the Flemish nationalists, exposed by the Dutch press, led to the suppression of the service and the transfer of its tasks to the civilian intelligence agency in 1929.

The threat of renewed conflict saw to the resurrection of military intelligence in 1937, partly to cope with a surge in German espionage. In January 1940, the service acquired plans for the German invasion of France, the Netherlands, and Belgium when the plane carrying the courier crash landed on Belgian soil in the Mechelen incident. The partially burnt plans allowed to deduce by what movements the three countries would be taken by the Nazi onslaught. Despite an attempt to hide their capture from the Germans, Hitler postponed the invasion to the spring. The Belgians shared the plans with the Dutch, French, and British. When the invasion did happen in May, it turned out it differed little from what could be gleaned from the documents captured the previous winter.

The intelligence officers who made it to England would once again coordinate resistance activities on occupied soil. The 2nd Bureau would cooperate closely with the Special Operations Executive. Its effectiveness was hampered however by the distrust of the Belgian government in exile who favoured working through the civilian State Security. The reason was the government's conflict with King Leopold III, who had chosen to stay in Belgium after surrendering and had become a prisoner of the Nazis. The government feared the military service would be too loyal to the king their commander-in-chief and deemed it a security risk. The State Security would relegate the 2nd Bureau to processing filtered intelligence, while both rivals would not communicate about what they were doing in Belgium with their resistance groups. The 2nd became so frustrated with the State Security's primacy that a High Commissioner had to be appointed to coordinate the two intelligence services and get them to fight the war against the Nazis rather than a war against each other.

After the war the service was renamed Direction Supérieure du Renseignement et de l'Historique (but its acronym was S.D.R.H., inversing the first two letters to confuse foreign spies). It occupied itself with the pursuit of collaborators, and a top-secret section, Services spéciaux, conducted espionage and covert action in Soviet-controlled Germany. The SDRH had also started taking an interest in the rise of the communist movement and entered into cooperation with private intelligence services, partly staffed with former agents, dedicated to monitoring communists. The SDRH undertook intelligence operations in support of the Belgian contingent participating in the Korean War. At home the service was made responsible for the military side of the NATO-led "stay behind" operation preparing for a possible Soviet invasion of the West: influenced by and closely co-operating with the British and American secret services, this was the job of the Service de Documentation, Renseignement et de l’Action (SDRA) VIII.

When the Belgian General Staff was reformed in 1964 the SDRH, renamed Service Général du Renseignement, was restructured and consisted of a division for intelligence (SDRI), security (SDRA), finance (SDRC) and the Army archive (CDH). The coming to Belgium of NATO in 1968, which coincided with the growing importance of the European Community, drastically changed the intelligence and security outlook of the country. The added international dimension would involve increased spying activity and turn Brussels into a target for terrorism. Anglo-American concerns about the services’ ability to cope with the expanded portfolio had to be alleviated with an increase in their resources, some of which would be paid for with American money. Belgian military personnel as well as officials from the other ministries now had easy access to the international organizations, which made them a primary target for Warsaw Pact spies. While the State Security was responsible for most of this activity, military counterespionage fell to SDRA III of the SGR.

In 1974 the SGR was involved in the establishment of the Public Information Office (PIO), a PR organisation by which the defence ministry sought to address the criticisms directed at the military by mainly pacifist and communist movements. Symptomatic of the SGR's obsession with the left, the service involved its associates in the right-wing private intelligence entities and other shady anti-communist organisations, which took over the PIO when the ministry abolished it in 1979.

During the 1980s, a number of incidents including the Walloon Brabant supermarket killings, the activities of terrorist groups such as the Combatant Communist Cells and the neo-Nazi Westland New Post brought attention and criticism to the activities and ineffectiveness of the nation's police and intelligence agencies. The State Security bore the brunt of these attacks, but the revelations about the Stay Behind activities reflected badly on the SGR as well. The first response of the government to put in place a new security framework was the creation of a joint anti-terrorism group (AGG, forerunner of the current Coordination Unit for Threat Analysis CUTA/OCAD/) in 1984 consisting of the police and intelligence services. In 1989, a year after the SGR had caught a Belgian colonel who had been spying for the Russians, the General Staff was reorganised again which included changes to the intelligence section, which was given the name of Algemene Dienst Inlichtingen en Veiligheid (ADIV). The provisions of this law reflected the historical tasks of the service in military security and counterintelligence, relations with national and foreign intelligence services, and information management.

In 1991, following two government enquiries, a permanent parliamentary committee known as the Committee I was established to bring the two Belgian intelligence agencies, not previously subject to any outside control, under the oversight of Belgium's parliament. Legislation governing the missions and methods of these agencies was put in place in 1998. During this time the Belgian Army suffered a trauma in 1994, when ten Belgian soldiers were executed in Rwanda during a UN peace keeping mission. Since the international task force had no intelligence capacity on the ground whatsoever, the Belgian commander had tried to establish a little network of his own. A direct result of this event was the decision that in future an intel unit was to join every Belgian Army mission abroad. The lessons learned were taken to Belgium's involvement with NATO's Kosovo intervention and most recently in Afghanistan as part of ISAF.

In the mid-nineties a number of claims appeared in the press that placed ADIV under scrutiny, about the service's SIGINT capabilities being used on citizens, about the provincial outposts of the service again raising suspicions about spying on its own citizens, while yet another article reported on a leaked text about a new Belgian defence concept that had questionable suggestions for intelligence reminiscent of the shadowy Stay Behind past. The Committee I investigated and managed to defuse these allegations.

With its emphasis on strategic geopolitical intelligence for military planning and the protection of Belgian interests, the ADIV conducts analysis on foreign intelligence targets. Central Africa, especially the Congo, is a priority herein. Thanks to Belgium's historical presence there, the intelligence machinery is firmly rooted and offers useful information on the African situation. This was demonstrated in 2006 with the EUFOR RDC mission to assist militarily in the security of democratic elections.

The ADIV has a modest imagery intelligence capability (IMINT): while sometimes receiving IMINT from its U.S. ally, Belgium in conjunction with France participates in the satellite program Helios II to procure its own images. The service was able to expand and improve its SIGINT operations after ‘special intelligence methods’ (BIM, stands for Bijzondere Inlichtingenmethoden) legislation was enacted in 2010 to enable advanced bugging and surveillance methods, under the close scrutiny of the Standing Committee I. As a response to expanding threats, BIM also enables the ADIV to address cyber security with greater effect. The service has responsibility for securing the classified communications of the federal government, which it assists on all matters involving cyber attacks. In 2014 the ADIV suffered an attack on its own network, for which it could however count on allied help in the form of U.S. Cyber Command. The ADIV enjoys a very close relationship with the N.S.A. and participates in a number of international SIGINT coalitions, including NATO's SYGDASIS and the 14 Eyes.

Traditionally focused on counterespionage, especially from 2014 onwards the ADIV got more involved in counterterrorism, supporting the civilian State Security (VSSE). In the aftermath of the Brussels bombings the ADIV gave the VSSE unfettered access to its communications and interceptions framework to help with the investigation. The attacks have led to an expansion of the budget and personnel of both intelligence services. In 2017 General Claude Van de Voorde was appointed head of the service to reform and modernize the ADIV; this appointment came after continuing internal strife between the civilians and the military personnel was at the root of serious dysfunctions.

== Organization ==
The General Information and Security Service consists of four main Divisions:

- Div I: External intelligence, security
- Div CI: Counter-intelligence, security intelligence
- Div A: Service functionment (personnel, finance, logistics, communications, military attachés, etc.)
- Div S: Military security and security qualifications

== See also ==
- Belgian stay-behind network
- Gladio in Belgium
