= Committee I =

The Committee I, or the Standing Intelligence Agencies Review Committee (Dutch: Vast Comité van Toezicht op de inlichtingen- en veiligheidsdiensten (Comité I), French: Comité permanent de contrôle des services de renseignements et de sécurité (Comité permanent R)), exercises external oversight over the Belgian State Security Service and the General Intelligence and Security Service and the Coordination Unit for Threat Analysis. It reports to the Belgian Federal Parliament, which appoints and dismisses its members.

The Committee I was founded in 1991 and began its work in 1993. It consists of three members, including a chairperson, who are appointed for a term of six years by the Belgian Chamber of Representatives. This term may be renewed. Its members are chosen from among magistrates, senior police officials or persons with significant administrative or scientific experience, however, the chairperson must be a magistrate. The chairperson of the Committee I is currently Vanessa Samain.

== Oversight duties ==
The Committee I has several oversight responsibilities. The law grants the members of the committee judicial powers to be able to conduct their investigations to the full:

- To launch accountability investigations into aspects of Belgian intelligence work, mostly prompted by but not limited to mishaps. The committee can choose to open investigations by itself, or be charged to do so by the ministers responsible, or parliament.
- To investigate complaints by citizens against the intelligence services and its members (excession of authority, misuse of legitimation, unwarranted consultation of databases).
- To act as appeal organ for citizens who feel they have been unjustly refused a security clearance. The committee is able to overturn the decision.
- To exercise control over the use of intrusive and technical surveillance methods: the committee controls the application of intrusive intelligence means during and after the operation, judging their use for legality, according to a set of criteria which balance the methods used for their proportionality with the threat against which they are used. The committee has the power to suspend the application of intelligence methods at all times. It also double-checks the permission to use the most intrusive methods (intercepts, hacking, eavesdrops) by a separate commission of magistrates, with the ability to suspend or override the BIM-Commission's refusals.
- To check intercepts, imagery recordings and IT-intrusions abroad executed by the Belgian military intelligence service ADIV/SGRS, for which the latter has to present a list of planned intercepts.
- To exercise control over the processing of information and personal data stored in the common databases used by the security services, together with the Control Organ for Police Information (COC).
- To act as data protection authority for the entire Belgian national security apparatus.
- To advise on draft laws, royal decrees, circulars, or any other government document that has legal implications regarding the functioning of the security services, when requested by Parliament or the responsible ministers.
- To conduct judicial investigations against members of the intelligence community suspected of having committed a crime, under the purview of the federal prosecution.
- To act as expert on intelligence accountability and liaise with foreign oversight bodies.

== Literature ==
- Kenneth Lasoen, 185 Years of Belgian Security Service, in: Journal of Intelligence History vol. 15 (2016), 96–118.
- Kenneth Lasoen, Indications and Warning in Belgium: Brussels is not Delphi in: Journal of Strategic Studies 40 (2017), 927–962.
- Kenneth Lasoen, For Belgian Eyes Only: Intelligence Cooperation in Belgium in: International Journal of Intelligence and CounterIntelligence 30 (2017), 464–490.
- Kenneth Lasoen, Plan B(ruxelles). Belgian Intelligence and the Terrorist Attacks of 2015-16 in: Terrorism and Political Violence 30 (2018). Online.
- Kenneth Lasoen, Belgian Intelligence SIGINT Operations in: International Journal of Intelligence and CounterIntelligence 32 (2019), 1-29.
