= Leopoldism =

Political ideology supporting Leopold III

Leopoldism is a collective name for political movements who were loyal to Leopold III of Belgium during the Royal question.

== Organisations ==
- Catholic Party

== See also ==
- Monarchy of Belgium
- Orangism (Kingdom of the Netherlands)
- Monarchism
- Belgian nationalism
