= State Security Service (Belgium) =

Belgian intelligence and security agency

Coordinates: 50°51′27.69″N 4°21′18.58″E

Veiligheid van de Staat - Sûreté de l'Etat
- VSSE

Agency overview
- Formed: 1830
- Headquarters: 6, Boulevard du Roi Albert, Brussels, Belgium
- Employees: 600
- Annual budget: € 50 million
- Agency executive: Francisca Bostyn, administrator-general
- Parent agency: Federal Public Service Justice

The State Security Service (Dutch: Veiligheid van de Staat; French: Sûreté de l'État, known by the combined acronym VSSE) is a Belgium intelligence and security agency. Established in 1830, it is the world's oldest intelligence service. The State Security is a civilian agency under the authority of the Ministry of Justice, while the military intelligence agency, the General Information and Security Service, operates under the authority of the Ministry of Defense. The current Administrator-General is Francisca Bostyn, after her predecessor Jaak Raes occupied the position between 2014 and 2022. The VSSE takes part in a number of international intelligence cooperative relationships, such as the Club de Berne and the CTG. It has contacts with over 90 sister services across four continents.

== Mission ==
The main objective of the State Security is the collection, analysis and processing of all intelligence that might prove relevant to the prevention of any activity that might be a threat against the internal or external security of the state, democratic and constitutional order, or international relations, the carrying out of security inquiries, and the performance of tasks in relation to the protection of certain important people. That last mission was transferred to the Belgian Federal Police in 2016. The State Security is also one of the main providers of threat intelligence to Belgium's threat analysis fusion centre, the Coordination Unit for Threat Analysis (CUTA/OCAD/OCAM). In recent years, the State Security's activities have focused on the terror threat emanating from Daesh.

== History ==
=== 19th century ===
Within days of Belgian independence, an "Administration for Public Safety" (Administration de la Sûreté Publique) was installed to protect the fledgling state against attempts by the Dutch king William I to suppress the Belgian rebels. The Public Safety would have two directorates, one being the alien police and the other the security service. As a security service, Public Safety had to protect the Belgian state against Dutch spies and republicans. Intelligence gathering happened only internally: spying abroad was considered a potential breach of the country's neutrality which was imposed by the other European states as a condition for Belgian independence. The service did initiate contacts with foreign intelligence services almost from the outset, building up tight relationships with other European secret services. After peace with the Netherlands, the service focused on subversive elements, successfully thwarting an attempted republican coup d'état instigated by Karl Marx in 1848. Other successes include the formation of an impromptu foreign intelligence service during the Franco-Prussian War of 1870 to support the Belgian Army, which was standing guard for a potential invasion of Belgium.

From the late 1870s and especially during the 1880s, the Public Safety's main concern was the rise of socialist movements. Its freedom from political control - due to the lack of a legal framework and politicians who preferred to keep their secret service at arms' length - led the service to actively engage in provocation operations. In 1886, this led to a scandal when a paid informer was caught planning a bombing attack: the Pourbaix Affair, as it was called, led to a slashing of the Public Safety's budget. Before long, funds had to be increased again however, as a wave of terrorist attacks by Russian anarchists struck Europe. During this time the Belgian intelligence service entered into a very close relationship with the Paris office of the Russian Okhrana.

=== 20th century ===
On the outbreak of the First World War, the Administration for Public Safety destroyed its archives to prevent them from falling into enemy hands. Nothing is known of its history during the war. At the front, a military intelligence service was founded in 1915 that conducted all intelligence work and coordinated the activity of the resistance. Soon after the end of the war, the rivalry between the Public Safety and its military counterpart, known today as the General Information and Security Service (ADIV/SGRS), would arise as both services' activities overlapped sometimes. The military intelligence service had been given the counterespionage mission, but after it was suspended in 1923 because of a scandal involving the Belgian occupation of the Rhineland, the Public Safety had to take over again. In 1929, an administrative reform made the alien police an independent department and the Public Safety was given the name it still has today: Security of the State (Veiligheid van de Staat/Sûrete de l'Etat).

In the 1930s, State Security was occupied dealing by left- and right-wing extremis, and a surge in German espionage activity. The German threat caused the Belgian government to reinstate the military intelligence service in 1937. As war became imminent, the two services were briefly brought together under the same ministry. After the German invasion, Belgian intelligence followed the government in exile to London to undertake the coordination of the resistance once again. This was impeded by the rift between the government and King Leopold III, who had decided to stay in Belgium and thus fall into the hands of the Nazis. The government, unwilling to trust the military intelligence service because of their loyalty to their commander-in-chief made prisoner of war, favoured the State Security. This greatly exacerbated the rivalry between the two services, whose mutual animosity forced the government to appoint a High Commissioner to coordinate their actions.

In 1944, State Security returned to Belgium with MI6 and the Dutch secret service, which was allowed to install itself in Brussels while waiting for the liberation of the Netherlands. The service would play a substantial part in the tracking and punishing of those who had collaborated with the Germans. Afterwards a severe political crisis ensued, as many Belgians opposed the return from captivity of the discredited Leopold III. The State Security had to monitor the opposing forces, especially the nascent communist movement. The onset of the Cold War shifted the focus almost entirely on communism. The threat of Soviet espionage would take priority when Belgium became the host nation of NATO headquarters. With British and American help, Belgian intelligence was significantly expanded to meet the surge of Warsaw Pact spies. As counterespionage required the expenditure of dedication manpower and resources, from the 1970s onward, the spectre of international terrorism would come to haunt Europe again. As a convenient transit country, Belgium would often feature in terrorist activity, giving the State Security a key role in many successful counterterrorism operations. Despite this, starting in 1982, Belgium would fall victim to a surge of violence. The attacks by the communist terror group Cellulles Combattantes Communistes (CCC) coincided with a number of incidents committed by a band of gangsters (eventually acquiring the name of "Les tueurs du Brabant" or "Bende van Nijvel") which gradually intensified in the level of violence used. Whereas the CCC was effectively neutralized within a year, the Brabant killers would continue their bloody activities before disappearing in November 1985 after their most violent raid on a supermarket that claimed 28 fatalities. The case, as well as the identities of the perpetrators, remain unsolved.

In attempts to investigate the traumatic events, the State Security's activities came under scrutiny. Revelations about the ties between certain intelligence officers and right-wing organisations coincided with hints that the Brabant killers were actually linked to the NATO-led Stay Behind operation, known in Italy as Gladio, and which were coordinated in the participating nations by their secret services. The ensuing parliamentary inquiries found that the Belgian security apparatus was flawed in that it was fragmented and unsupervised. The main recommendation therefore was to provide a legal framework for the intelligence and security services to operate in, and to place them under parliamentary oversight. The State Security entered the post-Cold War era clouded by uncertainty about its future. Despite a widespread demoralisation among the staff because of this, the service continued to successfully counteract the remaining KGB operations in Belgium. Throughout most of the 1990s, the service attempted to reorganise and revitalize itself.

=== 21st century ===
When in 1998 the Intelligence Services Act came in effect, the State Security finally had a legal framework that determined its remit and competences to fulfill its missions. The sensitivity of intelligence work, after the scandals of the 1980s, had led the lawmakers to postpone the authorisation to use intrusive technical means to collect intelligence. Instead, the Belgian intelligence services were only authorised to work with human sources (HUMINT). Technical collection of intelligence was not allowed, significantly putting the Belgian intelligence services behind their foreign counterparts in terms of collection and effectiveness. This was changed only in 2010 through the introduction of the Special Intelligence Methods Act (Bijzondere Inlichtingenmethoden, 'BIM' see below). Until then, the Belgian police had superior capabilities, having been allowed to use wiretapping and technical surveillance methods in 2003 (it had been the intention to provide the intelligence services with similar competences, but this work was left unfinished until 2009). Naturally, this caused a good deal of discontent with the State Security, which had to cede its place as the international preferred Belgian partner for counterterrorism.

Another cause for frustration was the installation of a threat intelligence fusion centre in 2006, a consequence of a European agreement to establish such centres as a reaction to the terrorist attacks on Madrid and London in 2004–2005. Fearing competition and even potential obsolescence, State Security chief Koenraad Dassen actively attempted to harm the establishment of the Coordination Unit for Threat Analysis (CUTA). Dassen did however try to lift the State Security's veil of secrecy, by publishing for the first time a public activity report in 2005, the same year the State Security celebrated its 175th anniversary with a conference ana book on its history and activities. However, the service was embarrassed by the escape of a Kurdish terrorist, as VSSE officers had been put to the task of guarding her while under house arrest. Dassen resigned, stating that guarding suspects was not a task fit for intelligence, but a job for the police.

In these years Belgian intelligence was adjusting to being subject to the oversight of the parliamentary review committee Committee I. Reorganisation and modernisation of the service was happening slowly and a first performance audit by the Committee I found a number of flaws. The root of the problem was however a chronic underfunding and political disinterest in the security services. Substantial reorganisation was needed when the service was finally allowed to conduct technical surveillance operations, requiring not only the equipment to do so, but also the right mindset to meet the demands for proper justification of the use of the methods granted by the 2010 BIM-law.

In the 2010s, the VSSE found espionage to be on the rise as never before, a result of the valuable and sensitive information present in Brussels, seat of various EU institutions. The CUTA and VSSE were the first security services to warn about the threat of foreign fighters returning to their country in the early days of the Syrian conflict. As the number of foreign fighters, grew the service quickly became overwhelmed, and requests for additional financial support were not met by the government even after the VSSE provided the information that foiled a terrorist cell in the border town of Verviers planning an attack shortly after the Charlie Hebdo massacre. The 13-14 November 2015 attack on Paris revealed Belgium to be the centre of terrorist activity, a connection given bloody confirmation on 22 March 2016, with the bombing of the Belgian national airport and a metro carriage in the European quarter. The circumstances that led to the failure to prevent the attacks were investigated by a parliamentary commission that recommended a substantial increase in the security services' manpower and budgets and a better integration of the different actors, as well as improvements of information management and sharing. Since 2016, the VSSE has increased its counterterrorism capabilities, helped by long-awaited financial injections. Cooperation with the other security services is also occurring at previously unseen levels of intensity. To further support public understanding of the work of the intelligence service, the VSSE celebrated the 20th anniversary of its legal framework by launching its website and publishing, for the first time in seven years, an activity report.

In 2022, the VSSE tipped the FBI about an Iraqi terrorist. A murder plot targeting former American president George W. Bush was thus foiled.

Between May 2025 and the spring of 2026 VSSE was targeted by a cyberattack, in which staff personal data may have been stolen. The breach reportedly occurred not inside State Security itself, but through a software vulnerability in the American cybersecurity firm Ivanti that helps secure communications. Investigators found the flaw during an IT infrastructure inspection, and attackers allegedly gained access to employees’ personal, phone, and email details—though they did not reach State Security’s internal network where highly sensitive, confidential information is exchanged. No clear information has been released yet about who is behind the attack or what happened to the possibly stolen data.

== Directors ==
The Belgian Security Service has had the following directors (called 'administrateur général'):

- Isidore Plaisant (1830-1831)
- Emmanuel François (politician) (1831-1839)
- Alexis Hody (1840-1852)
- Napoleon Joseph Verheyen (1852-1869)
- Victor Berden (1869-1882)
- Adolphe Gautier de Rasse (1882-1890)
- François Delatour (1890-1903)
- Jean Baptiste De Rode (1903-1906)
- Louis Gonne (1906-1927)
- Alfred Rémy (1927-1929)
- René Beltjens (1929-1933)
- Robert de Foy (1933-1943)
- Fernand Lepage (1940-1944)
- Pol Bihin (1944-1947)
- Robert de Foy (1947–1958)
- Ludovic Caeymaex (1958–1977)
- Albert Raes (1977–1990)
- Stephane Schewebach (1990–1993)
- Bart Van Lijsebeth (1994 – 1999)
- Godelieve Timmermans (2000 – 2002)
- Koenraad Dassen (2002 – 2006)
- Alain Winants (2006 – 2014)
- Jaak Raes (2014–2022)
- Francisca Bostyn (2022–present)

== Parliamentary supervision ==
During the 1980s, a number of incidents including the Brabant supermarket killings, the activities of terrorist groups such as the Combatant Communist Cells and the neo-Nazi Westland New Post brought attention and criticism to the activities and ineffectiveness of the nation's police and intelligence agencies.

In 1991, following two government enquiries, a permanent parliamentary committee, Committee I, was established to bring these agencies, not previously subject to any outside control, under the authority of Belgium's federal parliament. Legislation governing the missions and methods of these agencies was put in place in 1998.

== Entitlement ==
The entitlements of the Security Service were granted by the Intelligence Services Act of 30 November 1998. Belgian intelligence does not have policing power and is only able to gather and analyse information. In accordance with the 2010 Special Intelligence Methods Act ("Wet op de Bijzondere Inlichtingenmethoden", BIM) BIM methods make it possible to conduct surveillance with technical means and intercept communications. Their use falls under the strict supervision of the Committee I, during and after the operation, and can be suspended by the supervisory body if the use of the method is deemed unlawful. The most intrusive BIMs have to be approved beforehand by a separate committee of three specially appointed magistrates, called the BIM-Commission, and are again subjected to checks during and after by the Committee I.

The majority of the methods used (between 1500 and 2000 in recent years) concern localisations and identifications of cell phone numbers, in connection with counterterrorism.

== See also ==
- Belgian stay-behind network
- Gladio in Belgium

== Literature and sources ==
- L. Keunings, The Secret Police in nineteenth century Brussels, in: Intelligence and National Security, 1989.
- C. Carpentier & F. Moser, La Sûreté de l'État: histoire d'une déstabilisation, Ottignies, 1993.
- L. Van Outryve, Les services de renseignement et de sécurité, Bruxelles, Courier du CRISP, 1999.
- F. Caestecker, Alien Police in Belgium 1840-1940. The creation of guest workers, New York - Oxford, 2000.
- M. Cools, K. Dassen, R. Libert, P. Ponsaerts (eds.), La Sûreté. Essais sur les 175 ans de la Sûreté de l'État, Brussels, Politeia, 2005.
- Bové, Lars (2015). Les secrets de la sûreté de l'état. Enquête sur une administration de l'ombre (in French). Tielt: Editions Lannoo. ISBN 9789401425902.
- Lasoen, Kenneth (2016). "185 Years of Belgian Security Service". Journal of Intelligence History. 15 (2): 98–116. doi:10.1080/16161262.2016.1145854. S2CID 147394882.
- Lasoen, Kenneth (2017). "Indications and Warning in Belgium. Brussels is not Delphi". Journal of Strategic Studies. 40 (7): 927–962. doi:10.1080/01402390.2017.1288111. S2CID 157685300.
- Lasoen, Kenneth (2017). "For Belgian Eyes Only. Intelligence Cooperation in Belgium". International Journal of Intelligence and CounterIntelligence. 30 (3): 464–490. doi:10.1080/08850607.2017.1297110. hdl:1854/LU-8512001. S2CID 157376383.
- Lasoen, Kenneth (2018). "Plan B(ruxelles): Belgian Intelligence and the Terror Attacks of 2015-16". Terrorism and Political Violence: 1–19. doi:10.1080/09546553.2018.1464445. S2CID 149729772.
- Lasoen, Kenneth (2019). "Belgian Intelligence SIGINT Operations". International Journal of Intelligence and CounterIntelligence. 32: 5–19. doi:10.1080/08850607.2018.1488501. S2CID 158963928.
