= Joëlle Aubron =

French anarchist (1959–2006)

Joëlle Aubron (26 June 1959 – 1 March 2006) was a militant in the French group Action directe.

== Action directe involvement and arrests ==
Arrested on 9 April 1982, she was sentenced to 4 years in prison for concealment and possession of arms. In 1983, she married Régis Schleicher, another member of Action directe, whom she later divorced. Granted a remission of sentence following her marriage, she was released on 24 January 1984. She began running an anarchist bookshop, then went underground in 1985, when she joined the arm of Action directe that allied itself with the Red Army Faction. She participated in several attacks organized by Action directe, including the assassinations of General René Audran on 25 January 1985 and Georges Besse on 19 November 1986. Joëlle Aubron, along with Nathalie Ménigon, is considered to be directly responsible for these two assassinations, though their respective roles have not been determined.

Arrested with her comrades Jean-Marc Rouillan, Nathalie Ménigon and Georges Cipriani on 21 February 1987 on a farm in Vitry-aux-Loges (Loiret), she was sentenced in 1989 and 1994 to life in prison, with a minimum of 18 years. She was imprisoned at the Fleury-Mérogis Prison in Essonne until October 1999, when she was transferred with Nathalie Ménigon to the prison of Bapaume in Pas-de-Calais.

== Release ==
After undergoing operations for a brain tumour, she was released on 16 June 2004 and her sentence suspended by the law of 4 March 2002 concerning the rights of patients.

== Documentary ==
In 2005, she appeared in the documentary Ni vieux, ni traîtres, directed by Pierre Carles and Georges Minangoy.

== Death ==
Joëlle Aubron died on 1 March 2006, at the age of 46, from a cancer that had metastasized towards her brain.
