= Nathalie Ménigon =

Far left French terrorist

Nathalie Ménigon (born 28 February 1957 in Enghien-les-Bains, Val-d'Oise), was convicted for acts of terrorism committed while she was a member of the French revolutionary group Action Directe. She was sentenced to life in prison in 1989 and released in August 2008 after serving more than 20 years in prison.

== Arrest and imprisonment ==
She was arrested, with her companions Jean-Marc Rouillan, Joëlle Aubron and Georges Cipriani, on 18 February 1987 on a farm in Vitry-aux-Loges. She was convicted in 1989 for the 1986 assassination of Georges Besse, then-president of Renault, and of the 1985 assassination of René Audran, a senior official at the French Ministry of Defence. She was sentenced to life in prison.

She married Jean-Marc Rouillan on 29 June 1999 at the Fleury-Mérogis Prison.

== Release from prison ==
She was imprisoned in the Bapaume Prison, located in Pas-de-Calais, until August 2007. She was three times denied a suspended sentence for medical reasons, after suffering from hemiplegia, depression, problems balancing, and spasms. In May 2007 she was transferred to a house arrest program. The conditions allowed her to work during the days, but she had to spend her nights in prison. This parole was required in order for her to eventually be conditionally released from prison. Her conditional release was effective 2 August 2008.

While in prison she suffered from hemiplegia, caused by two strokes. She also engaged in self-harm in 2003, in protest of the jail conditions.

== New Anticapitalist Party ==
In July 2008, she expressed interest in the New Anticapitalist Party, started by Olivier Besancenot and the Revolutionary Communist League.
