= List of people diagnosed with Crohn's disease =

People with Crohn's disease

The following is a list of notable people diagnosed with Crohn's disease. Crohn's disease is a type of inflammatory bowel disease that may affect any part of the gastrointestinal tract from mouth to anus, causing a wide variety of symptoms. It primarily causes abdominal pain, diarrhea (which may be bloody if inflammation is severe), vomiting (which may be continuous), or weight loss. Crohn's disease may also cause complications outside the gastrointestinal tract, such as skin rashes, arthritis, inflammation of the eye, tiredness, and lack of concentration.

Name	Notability	Ref(s)
Alfred the Great	King of the Anglo-Saxons	
Juliet Anderson	American actress	
Anastacia	American pop singer	
Ömer Aşık	New Orleans Pelicans basketball player	
Kathleen Baker	American swimmer	
Ken Baumann	American actor, writer, publisher	
MrBeast	American YouTube personality	
Lili Boulanger	French composer	
Jeffrey Brown	American comic book artist and graphic novelist	
Pierre Carette	Former leader of the Belgian extreme-left militant group CCC	
Ali Carter	English snooker player	
P. Chidambaram	Indian politician	
Claire Chitham	New Zealand actress	
Chris Conley	Lead singer and guitarist of the band Saves the Day	
Charles Darwin	English naturalist, geologist and biologist	
Pete Davidson	American actor and comedian	
Lew DeWitt	American country music singer and composer	
Sacha Dhawan	British actor	
Kevin Dineen	Former professional ice hockey player	
Shannen Doherty	American actress	
Amy Dowden	Welsh dancer	
Dynamo	English magician	
Jonny Edgar	Racing driver	
Dwight D. Eisenhower	34th President of the United States	
Sam Faiers	English television personality	
Theoren Fleury	Professional ice hockey player	
Tommie Frazier	Former Nebraska quarterback	
D. R. Fulkerson	American mathematician	
David Garrard	American football player	
Carrie Grant	British celebrity vocal coach	
Krishnan Guru-Murthy	English broadcast journalist	
Mike Hadreas	Indie musician performing under the name Perfume Genius	
Chelsea Halfpenny	English actress	
Simon Harris	16th Taoiseach of Ireland	
Jim Hickey	New Zealand weather broadcaster for TVNZ	
Nicky Hopkins	English pianist and famed session musician	
Jeff Hordley	English actor best known for the soap opera Emmerdale	
Aerial Hull	American professional wrestler	
Ellen Idelson	TV comedy writer, actress, and producer	
Samantha Irby	American comedian, essayist, blogger, and television writer	
Ali Jawad	British Paralympic powerlifter	
Derrick Jensen	American author and environmental activist	
Carrie Johnson	American sprint canoer	
Dennis Kucinich	U.S. Representative	
Jon Landau	Rock critic	
Jack Leach	English cricketer	
Matt Light	American Football player, New England Patriots	
Louis XIII	King of France	
Stu Mackenzie	Frontman of the Australian band King Gizzard & the Lizard Wizard	
Jeremy Mansfield	South African radio host	
Audra McDonald	American actress	
Mike McCready	Lead guitarist of the American rock band Pearl Jam	
Thomas Menino	Former mayor of Boston, Massachusetts	
Felicia Michaels	American comedian	
Mark Millar	Scottish comic book writer, known for his work with Marvel Comics	
Mary Ann Mobley	Miss America in 1959; actress and television personality	
Rhys Morgan	Welsh sceptic	
James Morrison	English golfer	
Cedric Mullins	American baseball player	
Ged Nash	Irish politician	
Ogden Nash	American poet	
Larry Nance Jr.	American basketball player	
Lisa Neville	Australian politician	
Tyre Nichols	American photographer and FedEx worker	
Dan O'Bannon	American screenwriter (Alien, Total Recall)	
Melanie Onn	English politician	
Beth Orton	English singer-songwriter	
Daryl Palumbo	Lead singer for the bands Glassjaw and Head Automatica	
James Powderly	American artist and activist	
Mark Reale	American guitarist for the band Riot	
Jerry Sadowitz	Scottish comedian	
Jim Sheppard	Bassist of the American metal band Nevermore	
George Steele	American professional wrestler	
Ken Stott	Scottish actor	
Joe Thomas	Welsh 800m athlete	
Cody Vance	American professional wrestler	
Vikkstar123	English YouTube personality (Sidemen) and DJ	
Mieczysław Weinberg	Polish Jewish composer	
Tyler James Williams	American actor	
Lauren Winfield-Hill	English cricketer	
Yoni Wolf	Musician	
Yoon Jong-shin	Korean singer-songwriter	
