= Construction Photography =

Photo library based in London, England

- Type: Private
- Industry: Stock photography, video production, media management
- Founded: 2001
- Headquarters: London, United Kingdom
- Website: http://www.constructionphotography.com

Construction Photography is a photo library and agency based in London, England. It was established in 2001 to provide the construction and built environment industries an alternative to multinational agencies such as Getty images and Corbis.

Using digital asset management software, Construction Photography delivers content over the internet to government organisations such as Transport for London, Highways Agency, ConstructionSkills, Waste & Resources Action Programme as well as multinational corporations such as Vinci Plc, Lafarge, Compass Group, Corus Group, Gardiner & Theobald, Murphy Group, etc.).

Construction Photography has a stock collection of over 100,000 built environment related images, of which 30,000 are available online, and 170 assignment photographers operating from 15 countries.

In January 2014 Construction Photography was acquired by Photoshot License Limited, an independent photo library based in Farringdon, London.

== Line of business and skills ==
=== Image licensing and search ===
The library licence Rights Managed and Royalty Free images from content providers, photographers, agencies, museums and libraries around the world. In 2007 Construction Photography signed an agreement with the Russian state news agency Ria Novosti to represent its built environment content worldwide.

In the month of March 2005, Construction Photography launched a search engine including a feature called “Image Weight”. The search results are primarily ordered by image weight. Images increase in weight when users add them to a lightbox or a cart or open an image preview or large preview. Each action has a different weight. Images decrease in weight when they are removed from a lightbox or from the cart. An algorithm calculates in real time all these parameters to give each image a constant updated weight. Also included in the algorithm are the upload date and the keyword relevance to the search.

=== Media management ===
Construction Photography is the exclusive distributor of The Data Archive media management software (The Data Archive is the parent company of Construction Photography). The web-based digital assets management software helps companies within the built environment to manage their media content over the internet including photographs, videos, any type of media files or documents. The secure service also includes hosting, metadata management and data migration.

== Awards ==
Construction Photography was a finalist in the 2007 Construction Industry IT Awards organised by Contract Journal, a UK weekly construction magazine. The agency was a finalist for the Quality in Construction 2008 Awards organised by another weekly magazine, Construction News, for excellence in use of ICT.

== Industry membership ==
The company is an accredited member of BAPLA, the British Association of Picture Libraries and Agencies, the UK trade association representing UK commercial picture libraries and agencies.

In 2005 Construction Photography joined CEPIC, the Coordination of European Picture Agencies Press Stock Heritage (now Centre of the Picture Industry), which represents over 900 picture sources in 17 European countries.

The agency is a member of the Picture Licensing Universal System (PLUS), a worldwide coalition of companies, associations, and industry experts.
