= Revolutionary Front for Proletarian Action =

Belgian anarchist terrorist organisation

- Front Révolutionnaire d’Action Prolétarienne (in French)
- Dates active: fl. 1985
- Active regions: Belgium
- Ideology: Anarcho-communism; Anti-imperialism
- Political position: Far-left
- Status: Inactive

The Revolutionary Front for Proletarian Action (French: Front Révolutionnaire d’Action Prolétarienne) was a Belgian far-left terrorist organisation.

The organisation was active in 1985, and was known for the bombing of the Secretariat of the North Atlantic Assembly and the AEG Telefunken building.

== History ==
The Revolutionary Front for Proletarian Action was founded as a splinter of the Communist Combatant Cells at the initiative of Action Directe following disagreements with CCC leaders. The CCC would hasten to disassociate themselves from the organisation.

On 20 April 1985, a bomb was detonated in the building housing the secretariat of the North Atlantic Assembly, setting fire to the building. The organisation's acronym "FRAP" was spray painted on the outside of the building. FRAP later claimed responsibility for the attack through an anonymous call to Belgian radio. Twenty hours later on 21 April, another bomb was detonated at the AEG Telefunken building in Brussels. Nobody was injured in the attack, though the explosion blew out several windows in the structure and the neighbouring building. Though the organisation did not claim responsibility for the attack, the organisation's acronym was again found spray painted, on a wall in the building's garden. In both attacks, the bombs were detonated on windowsills. The bomb maker was suspected to be Luc Van Acker, a Mouscron-born conscientious objector who had earlier travelled to Sudan on a humanitarian mission during the Second Sudanese Civil War.

A CCC attack on the Federation of Belgian Enterprises which led to the death of two firemen on 1 May would lead to Acker allegedly losing his nerve, and in turn distancing himself from FRAP.

The FRAP would claim responsibility for the bombing of the Bayer AG headquarters on 22 June, though the attack was in reality conducted by an eco-terrorist organisation known as the Peace Conquerors.

In August, Chantal Paternostre was arrested after her fingerprints were found in a Brussels apartment used by the group during a police raid in 1984, on the suspicion of her involvement with FRAP. In January 1986, Luc Van Acker would similar be arrested following a police raid on a hideout.

Paternoste and Acker would appear before the Brussels court of assizes on 26 September 1988, alongside Pierre Carette and other associates of far-left extremist groups. The defendants accepted the legitimacy of the trial, unlike the CCC defendants which withdrew its lawyers and began a hunger strike. The tried FRAP members would be sentenced for five years in prison.

== See also ==
- Action directe (armed group)
- Communist Combatant Cells
- Red Army Faction
