= WNP =

WNP may refer to:

- Welsh Nation Party
- White Nationalist Party
- Wireless number portability
- Westland New Post
- Naga Airport (IATA code WNP), Philippines
- Wanstead Park railway station (National Rail station code WNP), London, England
