= NTSU =

NTSU may refer to:

- North Texas State University, a previous name of the University of North Texas in Texas, United States
- National Taiwan Sport University in Taoyuan City, Taiwan
- Nottingham Trent Students' Union in England
- National Technical Support Unit, a unit of the DSU of the Belgian federal police
