= Madani Bouhouche =

Belgian murderer

- Born: 14 June 1952; Brussels, Belgium
- Died: 22 November 2005 (aged 53)
- Occupations: Gendarme, neo-Nazi criminal
- Known for: Brabant killers suspect

Madani Bouhouche (14 June 1952 – 22 November 2005) was a Belgian gendarme, and associate of the far right who was convicted of two murders, but strongly suspected of committing a third and attempting several more. He organised a small circle of like-minded men of police and even professional backgrounds into a self-sufficient gang that carried out at least one multimillion-dollar robbery, and the initial stage of a bizarre extortion plot that included a notorious and still-unsolved series of multiple robbery-homicides. A lifelong gun fanatic, he repeatedly retained and then was caught with illegal weapons that implicated him, with his final downfall coming when he shot dead the head of a family of diamond merchants that he and his partner tried to rob. Although he always denied any involvement and passed a polygraph, Bouhouche became the subject of enduring suspicions about what he might have been able to reveal about mass shootings by the still unidentified Brabant killers.

== Life and criminal activities ==
Madani "Dany" Bouhouche was born in Brussels, son of an Algerian father and Belgian mother. His views have been described as neo-Nazi despite his parentage. He started his police career with the Bijzondere Opsporings Brigade (BOB), a detective branch of the Rijkswacht/Gendarmerie in a fragmented law enforcement system that Belgium then had. Soon after joining the BOB, Bouhouche developed illegal activities with a few gendarmes of the BOB and others, most of whom ended up dismissed, imprisoned, fugitive or murdered after being inveigled into helping him. In 1981 he was caught trying to electronically surveil another unit and reassigned to regular duty, the same year he committed burglary of Group Diane in Etterbeek, stealing firearms including machine guns. Also in 1981 the superior officer who insisted on the disciplining of Bouhouche was almost killed in a machine gun attack that happened within days of another investigator suspicious of Bouhouche being the target of a car bomb. Both attempted multiple murders were linked to Bouhouche and associates (by the provenance of an automatic rifle and remote control component respectively). By this time under a cloud, he quit the Gendarmerie along with an accomplice, Robert Beijer, eventually setting up a private detective bureau Agence de Recherches et d'Informations, before Bouhouche left and bought a gun shop. A small framed man who often wore sunglasses, Bouhouche enjoyed hobbies such as mountaineering and skydiving, however his lifelong obsession was shooting and he participated in private paramilitary training with far-right acquaintances, these included fellow members of Westland New Post, an organisation given close attention by the Brabant killers investigation for reasons independent of his involvement with it.

Vague circumstantial links abound between Bouhouche's gang and the Brabant killers, they included the taking of risks to steal firearms rather than money; firearms stolen, used or seen carried in the killings being types he was known to have either bought (MAC10) or stolen (heavy buckshot riot guns, MP5 submachine guns), and those very same type weapons being found neither in the Brabant killer gangs' river dump of their guns nor in Bouhouche's secret arms cache of guns stolen from Group Diane. Moreover, the method of anonymising firearms and manufacturing false car number plates were reportedly identical; the areas chosen for clandestine disposal sometimes overlapped, both stored stolen cars for long periods, etc. However, even when taken together, the pattern of similarities is inconclusive, as such a large-scale investigation would be expected to reveal coincidental parallels between armed gangs of the same era. A forged number plate found on a stolen car used by the Brabant gang and reportedly showing signs of being made by the same set of equipment as Bouhouche's might have amounted to more tangible evidence of a connection, but like a number of other items of evidence it was lost before being properly examined.

== Arrests and trials ==
He was first arrested in January 1986 on suspicion of murdering his acquaintance Juan Mendez, a FN Herstal weapons engineer, whose firearms collection Bouhouche had stolen. Because he was in the deceased man's home with his family when police arrived, he came under suspicion. Bouhouche used hollow-point ammunition years before during an incident when he opened fire in the line of duty. Furthermore, a pistol was found in his home hidden inside a frozen spaghetti sauce that was the same type and considered ballistically identical to the Mendez murder weapon. However, the evidence was challenged and Bouhouche was released in November 1988. The next year, Bouhouche fled the country and sought after a diamond dealer in Antwerp who Bouhouche murdered in what he said was a factored debt collection that got out of hand, but was suspected to be a botched robbery. He was brought back to Belgium, convicted of the murder, and of murdering a security guard who had disappeared along with a consignment of gold in 1982. Bouhouche was acquitted on the charge of attempting to murder his superior in 1981. Another man was convicted as a fugitive for the gold robbery murder but was acquitted at a retrial when finally caught. The trial was one of the longest in Belgian history, and greatly embarrassed the Belgian Gendarmerie or Rijkswacht and politicians responsible for it. Bouhouche was sentenced to 20 years in prison.

== Public reaction ==
Suspicion over Bouhouche having been involved in the still unsolved 28 murders committed 1982–85 by the mysterious Brabant killers grew as details emerged of his violent behavior and bizarre schemes. The most remarkable revelation was that Bouhouche had been leader of a complex extortion plot for blowing up gas pipelines just outside the shops of a supermarket chain (the Brabant killers' massacres had mainly been of shoppers in a chain of just such stores). Bouhouche had thought up the extortion scheme in the late seventies and involved several friends in concrete pre-preparations, which progressed to the construction of a secret escape tunnel from a building where the ransom payment was to be made. Another connection was that Mendez became so concerned that guns had passed through his hands and then been used in the Brabant killers crimes, that he had repeatedly contacted police for reassurance. Bouhouche's physical size and facial features not fitting any description compiled from early unmasked encounters with three main members of the Brabant killers gang weighs against his active participation, especially in 1985.

== Post-parole life and death ==
On 15 September 2000 Bouhouche was freed on parole, with the authorities (embarrassed the previous year by failing to track down a fugitive associate living openly in Florida) seemingly having little interest in pressuring him for information. He moved to the French Pyrenees, isolated near the small city of Fougax-et-Barrineuf, and living quietly in a modest hilltop home with virtually no modern amenities. He worked in a rental accommodation business owned by an old shooting and Westland New Post acquaintance. Bouhouche died in November 2005, in an apparent accident while trimming a tree. Bouhouche's death only became known to authorities in Belgium days afterward, which caused some controversy about whether the Brabant killers investigation's interest in him properly reflected his viability as a suspect. In May 2026, the Belgian magazine Humo questioned whether or not Bouhouche really died in November 2005, suggesting he might have staged his own death. From the pictures taken of the person who died, it was impossible to identify Bouhouche. The body was cremated four days after the supposed accident, without any Belgian public servant ever having investigated or visited the body before cremation.
