= David Redfern =

English photographer

David Redfern (7 June 1936 – 22 October 2014) was an English photographer specialising in music photography. He worked as a photographer for 45 years and had over 10,000 pictures in his collection including photos of the Beatles and Jimi Hendrix. In 1999 he published a book about his life called The Unclosed Eye.

== Biography ==
Redfern was born in Ashbourne, Derbyshire, and began his career photographing jazz festivals such as the Beaulieu Jazz Festival in Beaulieu, Hampshire. He was a regular visitor to the Marquee Club and to Ronnie Scott's Jazz Club in the 1960s, where he photographed Miles Davis and Ella Fitzgerald. Buddy Rich said, "He's the Cartier-Bresson of jazz." In the 60s, Redfern photographed the TV show Ready Steady Go!, and the UK tour by Motown artists, including Stevie Wonder, the Four Tops, Martha and the Vandellas, Smokey Robinson and the Miracles and Marvin Gaye. Redfern also photographed the Beatles during the making of the Magical Mystery Tour film in 1967.

In 1980, Redfern became the regular tour photographer of Frank Sinatra, at the request of the singer. Redfern set up a photo agency which represented his own work, and that of more than 400 photographers who specialised in music subjects. Redfern sold his agency to Getty Images in 2008.

He was president of BAPLA, the British Association of Picture Libraries and Agencies, from 1992 until his death in 2014.

Redfern died of cancer, aged 78, in his home in Uzès, France.

== Books ==
David Redfern's Jazz Album. London: Eel Pie Publishing Limited, 1980. ISBN 0-906008 16 6

- The Unclosed Eye: The Music Photography of David Redfern. London: Sanctuary Publishing Limited, 1999). ISBN 1-86074-255-6.
- The Unclosed Eye: The Music Photography of David Redfern, Expanded second edition. Self-published, 2005. ISBN 0-9550718-0-1.
