= Brabant killers =

Belgian gang

Brabant Killings
- Part of Les Années de plomb (Years of Lead)
- Gendarmerie-distributed poster with the likenesses of the gang's members
- Location: Brabant (mostly), also in East Flanders, Hainaut, and Namur, Belgium. On one occasion, in the town of Maubeuge, France.
- Date: 31 December 1981– 9 November 1985
- Target: Delhaize grocery stores, arms and other retailers, motorists, etc.
- Attack type: Serial killing, mass shootings, robberies
- Weapons: Two riot guns (possibly Winchester 1200s and/or a Franchi SPAS 12; One .45 Ingram MAC 10 submachine gun One MP5SD5; 7.65mm Ortgies Semi-Automatic Pistol
- Deaths: 28 (including a Belgian communal policeman and a gendarme)
- Injuries: 22 (including 2 French gendarmes, 2 Belgian communal police officers, and a Belgian gendarme)
- Perpetrators: Alleged to have been career criminals and off-duty gendarmes associated with the far-right Westland New Post and VMO
- No. of participants: 4 to 10 (according to Jean Depretre, the case's former lead prosecutor)
- Motive: Possibly far-right extremism
- Inquiries: Various prosecutor-led investigations and a later parliamentary inquiry
- Accused: None living are known to be under investigation.
- Convictions: None
- Convicted: None

The Brabant killers (Note: French: Tueurs du Brabant, lit. 'Killers of Brabant'; Dutch: Bende van Nijvel, lit. 'Gang of Nivelles') are a group of unidentified criminals responsible for a series of violent attacks that mainly occurred in the Belgian province of Brabant between 1982 and 1985. A total of 28 people died and 40 were injured in their attacks.

The actions of the gang, believed to consist of a core of three men, made it Belgium's most notorious unsolved crime spree. The active participants were known as the Giant (French: Le Géant; a tall man who may have been the leader); the Killer (Le Tueur; the main shooter) and the Old Man (Le Vieux; a middle-aged man who drove). The identities and whereabouts of the "Brabant killers" are unknown.

Although significant resources are still dedicated to the case, the most recent arrests connected to the case are of the now-retired original senior detectives themselves, for alleged evidence tampering.

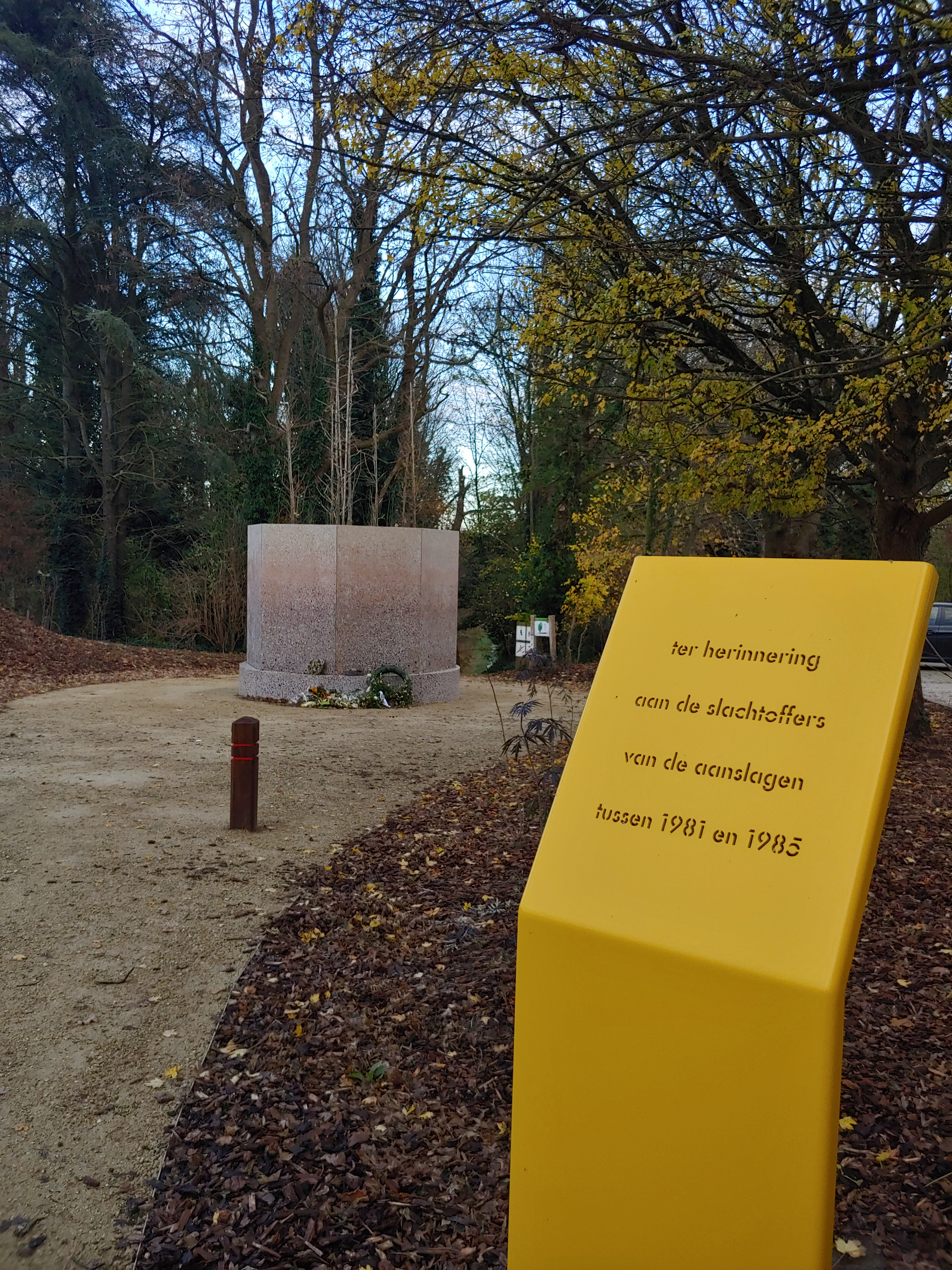
The monument to remember the victims of de Bende van Nijvel. "in memory of the victims of the attacks between 1981 and 1985".

The gang abruptly ceased their activities in 1985. The ensuing chaotic investigation failed to catch them or even make serious inroads into solving the case. This led to a parliamentary inquiry and public discussion, both of which revolved around the possibility that the gang members were Belgian or foreign state security elements either carrying out covert missions (disguising targeted assassinations) or conducting political terrorism.

The investigation into the case was officially closed in June 2024, but continued into 2025.

== Overview of crimes attributed to the gang ==
=== 1981 ===
- 31 December: Burglary at a Gendarmerie barracks in Etterbeek. Theft of automatic weapons, ammunition, and a car. Some of these items were later allegedly recovered in a garage belonging to Madani Bouhouche.

=== 1982 ===
- 13 March: Theft of a 10-gauge fowling shotgun from a store in Dinant, Belgium. Two men were seen running away.
- 10 May: Theft at gunpoint of an Austin Allegro. One of two such instances in which the Killer was seen without a mask. He spoke French, apparently as a first language and with the inflection of an educated man. The car was dumped almost immediately. Theft of a Volkswagen Santana from a car showroom.
- 14 August: Armed robbery of a grocery store in Maubeuge, France. Food and wine were stolen. Two French police officers were shot and seriously wounded when they arrived on the scene while the goods were being loaded into a vehicle.
- 30 September: Armed robbery of a weapons dealer in Wavre, Belgium. Fifteen firearms were stolen, including sub-machine guns. A police officer was killed at the scene; two others were shot and seriously wounded later.
- 23 December: Armed robbery of a restaurant in Beersel, Belgium. Coffee and wine were stolen. The caretaker was tortured and killed.

=== 1983 ===
- 9 January: Robbery and murder of a taxi driver in Brussels, Belgium. The car was later found in Mons, Belgium.
- 28 January: Theft of a Peugeot at gunpoint.
- 11 February: Armed robbery of a supermarket in Rixensart, Belgium. Less than $18,000 (equivalent to $48,839 in 2025) was stolen. Several people were wounded. No one was killed.
- 22 February: An Audi 100 with bullet holes from the 11 February incident was stolen from a commercial garage where it was being repaired, but quickly abandoned.
- 25 February: Armed robbery of a supermarket in Uccle, Belgium. Less than $16,000 (equivalent to $43,412 in 2025) was stolen. No one was killed.
- 3 March: Armed robbery and murder at a supermarket in Halle, Belgium. Less than $18,000 (equivalent to $48,839 in 2025) was stolen. One supermarket staff member was killed.
- 7 May: Armed robbery of a supermarket in Houdeng-Gougnies, Belgium. Less than $22,000 (equivalent to $59,692 in 2025) was stolen. No one was killed.
- 10 September: Armed robbery and murder at a textile factory in Temse, Belgium. Seven bullet-proof jackets were stolen. A worker was killed and his wife was severely wounded. The firm had recently begun manufacturing the jackets (for the police) which was not widely known.
- 17 September: A couple were murdered in the early hours after stopping their Mercedes at a 24-hour self-service gas station beside a store that the gang was burgling. Despite the alarm going off, the gang took the time to load twenty kilos of tea and coffee and 10 litres of cooking oil. Two gendarmes responding to the alarm were shot as they arrived on the scene; one was killed, the other seriously wounded. The gang escaped in a Saab turbo stolen on 22 February and the murdered couple's Mercedes. After shooting up a police car that began following them, the gang used a little-known minor road to get away in the Saab; after unsuccessful attempts to destroy the car by shooting the petrol tank, they left it near the garage from which the Audi had been stolen (also linked to the Volkswagen hijacked in 1982, and close to the Delhaize supermarket that would be attacked on September 27, 1985). Investigators believe that the repeated propinquity may indicate that some members lived in the area. Potentially crucial evidence collected from the Saab 'disappeared'.
- 2 October: Armed robbery of a restaurant in Ohain, Belgium. Nothing was stolen. The owner was killed.
- 7 October: Armed robbery of a supermarket in Beersel, Belgium. Less than $35,000 (equivalent to $94,965 in 2025) was stolen. One customer was killed.
- 1 December: Armed robbery of a shop in Anderlues and murder of the couple who owned it. About 3,000 Euros of jewellery was stolen. The owner's wife was instantly killed without warning as the gang entered. The owner attempted to defend himself with a pistol but was shot dead. The gang destroyed a surveillance camera recording before leaving. The stolen Volkswagen used had fake license plates copied from a legitimately owned Volkswagen of the same model that was linked to the garage where the Audi was taken, and where the new Volkswagen taken at gunpoint in 1982 was bought.

=== 1985 ===
- 27 September: Armed robbery at the Delhaize supermarket on rue de la Graignette in Braine-l'Alleud. Less than $6,000 (equivalent to $14,598 in 2025) was stolen. Three people were killed and two wounded. Between 15 and 25 minutes later, there was an armed robbery of the Delhaize supermarket on Brusselsesteenweg in Overijse. Less than $25,000 (equivalent to $60,827 in 2025) was stolen. Five people were killed and one wounded.

As a result of these robberies, security was increased at many stores in the region — including armed guards.

- 9 November: around 7:30 p.m.: Armed robbery at the Delhaize supermarket on the Parklaan in Aalst. This market was outside the area the gang usually operated in. They arrived while an armed patrol that checked the supermarket was still present. A family of four encountered the perpetrators in the parking lot after they left the shop and the mother, father, and daughter were killed apparently without motive. The surviving boy from the family ran back into the shop where he was singled out and shot at point-blank range; he was very badly wounded in the hip. Less than $25,000 was taken, and eight people were killed with several others seriously injured. Gang members (wearing bizarre face paint and disguises) roared at and taunted customers. They also were reportedly laughing and smiling during the gratuitous shootings, which were done by the "Killer". The robbers did not leave the scene right away after returning to their parked getaway vehicle. The patrol vehicle from Belgium's Rijkswacht/Gendarmerie backed some distance away when the shooting started; the municipal police arrived, although many of their cars had refused to start, but mainly remained at an exit of the parking lot that was well away from the gang. The getaway began with the "Giant" walking alongside the getaway car. A policeman fired his revolver at the gang's VW, which went through an unblocked exit and sped away. Rijkswacht/Gendarmerie vehicles stayed put, but a police van pursued the gang for a few kilometres.

In November 1986, the discovery in a canal of various items and weapons taken or used in the gang's crimes provided important evidence. A long-running dispute erupted over the find, amid assertions that the location was checked in 1985; therefore the weapons could not have been there from before that time and a second search must have been done with guilty knowledge. In 2019, the now-retired officers responsible for ordering the 1986 search were officially questioned on suspicion of manipulating the investigation, but they protested that the original search of the canal was not an underwater inspection by frogmen, as done in 1986. A Volkswagen Golf car — similar to that used in the getaway — had been found burned out in 1985 in woods relatively close to the canal; however, it was said the condition of the items meant they could not have been immersed since that time.

== Method of operation ==
The items taken and paraphernalia they disposed of seemed to indicate that the gang were shooting enthusiasts involved in drug dealing and burglaries, combining their criminal activity with daytime jobs such as food preparation or scrap metal dealing. Under this interpretation, the crimes were largely for material reward and escalated out of bravado. On the other hand, odd elements were also evident:

- Robbery proceeds were modest relative to the extreme risks. Early raids were often amateurish – for example, the Giant not wearing gloves, and the Killer and the Old Man allowing themselves to be seen without masks while taking a car at gunpoint.
- The pause in the raids and the killings followed by the escalated resumption in 1985, when a nine-year-old girl and other bystanders were shot dead for no reason in the parking lot before the gang had entered the supermarkets.
- Firearms were a particular interest; the 12-gauge pump shotguns used were loaded with a rare buckshot similar to that used by Group Diane (a former special forces unit of the Belgian Gendarmerie). Some policemen thought the gang used tactics in gunfights very similar to those taught in police courses.
- The cars used, often Volkswagens, were stripped of distinctive trim and had vehicle modifications including repainting, indicating a mechanic's facilities and expertise, but also a desire to retain VW parts.
- Getaway routes were well planned and navigated at top speed, but the gang were often still on the scene when armed police arrived.

The gang is believed to have had at least one helper on its last raid. In 1986, weapons that the gang had were found along with bulletproof jackets and other items in a canal about 30 km outside Brussels. The Winchester pump shotguns used in the massacres were never found.

== Relation to NATO's stay-behind network ==
Several authors and a BBC Documentary have linked the attacks to NATO's stay-behind network, colloquially named Operation Gladio, which was a network of clandestine cells installed in various European countries. These cells were linked to former Nazi and far-right groups in various countries, such as Italy, France, Spain, Portugal and Belgium, and funded terrorist activities under the guise of preventing a Soviet invasion of Europe and preventing the left from gaining traction in Europe. In the case of the Brabant Killings, several authors link Paul Latinus and the Westland New Post, a neo-Nazi group to the killings, under the NATO "Strategy of Tension".

Journalist René Haquin, who had interviewed Paul Latinus several times and appeared in the BBC Documentary, in a retrospective in 1999 outlined a timeline of events relating to the Brabant Killings. Haquin stated that in the 1970s, the United States had seen Belgium as the "soft underbelly" of Europe in the case of a Soviet invasion, and as a result had started infiltrating the police services in Belgium as a means of "toughening them up", introducing American methods of policing and investigating political groups, including training exercises which were conducted in the Palais de justice de Bruxelles along with US and Belgian authorities.

However, the Public Prosecutors Office in Brussels and the Gendermerie eventually took note of the fact that these methods were not legislated by the Parliament in Brussels, and were not ones overseen by the Public Prosecutor's Office. As a result, the methods the United States wished to install to "toughen up" Belgium were rolled back and "traditional methods" were returned to. As a result, Haqin states, the United States, having failed to get what they want, sought to launch attacks to force the hand of the government into taking more proactive measures similar to those of other European nations in NATO.

Haqin also stated that it may have been possible that tensions were stoked within left-wing communist organisations to commit them to violent acts, or frame them for violent acts, such as in the case of the assassination of Italian Prime Minister Aldo Moro, which led to a fracturing in the electoral base as the public reacted negatively to the perceived violent actions of the Italian Communist Party,

Other authors have suggested the reasoning for the attacks was due to the fact that the left in Belgium were gaining ground. In the 1981 Belgian General Election several left or left-leaning parties were close to victory, with Parti Socialiste (The Socialist Party of Belgium) and the Socialistische Partij gaining over 700,000 votes each. They argue that that the intention was to use the attacks to force a change in the political landscape to weaken the left.

In his book "De Bende Van Nijvel" (The Nivelles Gang), author and investigative journalist Guy Bouten stated that there were several factions within the NATO Stay-Behind network, one of which was linked to Westland New Post and other alignments within the Stay-Behind group, and used the same weapons caches which had been created by and for the network to commit the crimes. In the course of writing the book, Bouten spoke to lawyer Xavier Magnée and summarised what their views were on the case:

According to Magnée, the Gang was a criminal network with international branches. It all ran together. Barbouzes and ripoux, a hodgepodge of former police officers and gendarmes, performed all sorts of dirty jobs for the respected upper class with the help of a few criminals. The motives were diverse: drugs, weapons, tax fraud, and sexual blackmail...

I believed more in the conspiracy theory that gendarmes, but also soldiers, ex-mercenaries, and secret agents from the far-right—united with American support in a kind of Stay Behind—committed the Gang's crimes with the help of criminals. Their ultimate goal was a strong state with a well-armed gendarme that could crack down on protesters and strikers. In the early 1980s, the economic crisis caused considerable social unrest after three consecutive index jumps and the devaluation of the Belgian franc. And then there were the numerous demonstrations by peace activists opposing the deployment of American nuclear missiles.

Bouten, G. "De Bende Van Nijvel", p9.

== Ulterior motives ==
=== Official complicity ===
Certain events surrounding the robbery of the Delhaize supermarket in Aalst on 9 November 1985 served to further strengthen media-fuelled rumours of a connection between the gang and elements of the Belgian military and the Belgian Gendarmerie in particular. For example, the supermarket was hit despite patrols passing it every twenty minutes and gendarmes close to the scene did not engage or pursue the robbers. Although no such connection has been officially proven, the lack of satisfactory performance in the Brabant killers' case was among the reasons for the subsequent abolishing of the Belgian Gendarmerie.

A connection to the clandestine stay-behind network S.D.R.A VIII (Operation Gladio) has also been suggested. However, an official parliamentary inquiry found no substantive evidence that the network was involved in any terrorist acts or that criminal groups had infiltrated it.

A supposed connection between the Brabant killers, Gladio, and the by-then defunct Belgian far-right organisation Westland New Post led by Paul Latinus is mentioned in the 1992 BBC Timewatch documentary series Operation Gladio, directed by Allan Francovich, in which it is suggested that Latinus said that his organisation was sanctioned by the Belgian government.

=== Neo-Nazi groups Front De la Jeunesse and Westland New Post ===
In March 1981, Paul Latinus and members of Front de la Jeunesse founded Westland New Post, a paramilitary far-right group that was investigated after a 1980 incident in which a member shot at a group of North Africans, causing one death and a national outcry. The killer was with a firearms enthusiast who was a friend of police officer Madani Bouhouche, and decades later let him stay in a French property after Bouhouche was released on licence from a life sentence for two murders. The milieu of WNP included a former member (now deceased) of the French terrorist group OAS, and several others from the Front de la Jeunesse who conducted paramilitary firearms training in some of the forested areas that were later used by the Brabant killers. The WNP was a secret organisation. Speculation about a connection to the Brabant killers increased after former WNP members — including the only Gendarmerie — recalled being ordered to covertly surveil and compile a report on security arrangements at Belgian supermarkets of a large chain that was targeted by the killers. WNP had a genuine intelligence operative advising on covert techniques; NATO behind-the-lines units are known to have used the planning of robberies as a training exercise. Michel Libert, the former second-in-command of Westland New Post, admitted passing on Latinus's orders to gather detailed information on supermarkets with a view to robberies, but denied knowing of any purpose to the assignments beyond developing clandestine skills.

Marcel Barbier, an enforcer-type WNP member who lived with Libert, was arrested in August 1983 after a shooting, and became suspected in a double murder in Anderlecht a year earlier. Latinus went to police and informed them that Barbier and another WNP member had committed the synagogue murders, and that he (Latinus) had helped Barbier get rid of the murder weapon. This caused dissension within the WNP as Latinus was seen as having betrayed a member of the organisation. Also in 1983 several members of WNP who were in Front de la Jeunesse (Belgium) were convicted of organising it as an illegal militia, and given terms in prison. Leading WNP members were also arrested for unauthorised possession of low-level classified NATO documents. Latinus committed suicide in April 1984, and his followers formed rival cliques. Some theories have connected these facts to the inactivity of the Brabant Killers gang between December 1983 and September 1985, and them having a seemingly intensified grudge against society during the supermarket massacres of 27 September and 9 November 1985.

Barbier was convicted for the Anderlecht murders. His co-accused, WNP member Eric Lammers, was acquitted of murder but received 5 years for other offences, and in 1991 was convicted of a separate double murder. Lammers fled the country after being accused of a sexual exposure against a child and accessing images of child sex abuse. After he was brought back from Serbia he appeared in a 2014 Belgian TV program in which he accused WNP leaders of being behind the Brabant killings, based on WNP reconnaissance on the supermarket chain whose premises were subjected to the murderous attacks of 1985. Libert was arrested as a suspect soon after the program was broadcast, but released without charge after 48 hours. In 2018 a former subordinate of Libert publicly accused him of being the 'Giant', although without any official reaction. Libert went on television to yet again deny the allegations, and said the accuser had mental health difficulties.

== Possible suspects ==
Notorious professional criminals, including Patrick Haemers and Madani Bouhouche, both of whom are now deceased, have been considered as possible suspects. Haemers's height was consistent with descriptions of the Brabant gang's "Giant", but his known criminal activities have been considered inconsistent with the pattern of the Brabant killings, particularly their apparently indiscriminate violence and relatively small financial gains.

Bouhouche was a former gendarme and gun shop owner suspected and known to have been involved in a number of violent crimes. He was arrested in 1986 for the murder of Juan Mendez, an acquaintance of his who had expressed his fear that some weapons stolen from him by Bouhouche had been used in the Brabant killers' crimes. Although he was released in 1988, police had found that Bouhouche had anonymously rented garages to store stolen cars, weapons he had stolen in a 1981 burglary of a Gendarmerie guard station in Etterbeek, and false duplicate car plates, some of which could have a connection to the Brabant killers. Also, items thought to have been abandoned by the Brabant killers turned out to include several TV remote controls adapted for triggering explosions, not unlike Bouhouche had intended to use in a complex extortion scheme involving IED attacks against a supermarket chain years before the Brabant killers started targeting supermarkets. This and all other evidence seemingly connecting him to the Brabant killers was considered inconclusive, but did little to allay the suspicion that he may have had inside information about the Brabant killers. He eventually died in 2005 while employed by a rental accommodation business owned by an old shooting and Westland New Post acquaintance.

== Investigation ==
In 1983, on the basis of a forensic examination of a weapon, and a witness who said he had seen the Saab hidden, authorities charged the gun owner (a former municipal policeman) and several other men ("Borains") with the Brabant killings. Police said they obtained incriminating statements containing guilty knowledge. The Brabant killers' jewellery shop double murder occurred while the "Borains" accused were in detention. After it was found that a German ballistic experts' report discrediting the main hard evidence against the accused had been suppressed by the prosecutor, charges against the "Borains" were dismissed, and the freed men furiously alleged they had been coerced in abusive 36 hour interrogations, and supplied with details for false confessions. The original "Borains" suspect was unsuccessfully approached for information in 2015.

An initially promising lead for the enquiry concerned a member of a family of Romany origin that was well known in the underworld, who led a group of armed robbers. He was charged with being one of the Brabant Killers and at one point made (later retracted) admission to having participated without his gang in the massacres but provided no details, and the line of investigation proved fruitless.

The law enforcement agencies hunting the killers made many mistakes during the early years of the investigation, often as a result of rivalries among the various authorities. Among the worst oversights were the failure to preserve cars the gang modified and dumped, and the loss of items with fingerprints. The original investigating magistrate was criticized for lack of professionalism by mishandling evidence and not considering alternatives to his hypotheses. Publicity about the case and the offer of a substantial reward resulted in a vast number of tips from ordinary Belgians with personal scores to settle, thereby diverting investigative resources from viable suspects.

=== Current lines of inquiry ===
Most suspects date back to the beginning of the investigation, and have been repeatedly questioned over the years. The latest was Christiaan Bonkoffsky, ex-Gendarmerie unit Group Diane, who before his alcohol-related 2015 death made a confession to being the so-called Giant. A riot gun and ammunition basket labelled "Gendarmerie-Politie", were apparently dumped by the Brabant killers (possibly after having been stolen by them). Bonkoffsky had already been scrutinised as a potential suspect in 2000. Investigators utilising forensic DNA and fingerprints have definitely ruled him out as the Giant.

In June 2020 Belgian detectives appealed for information on the identity of man in a photograph sent to police in 1986. They reissued a photo of a man holding a SPAS-12 in a forest. The photo was reissued on the orders of a judge. They also appealed for information on the identity of a man with a 3.5 cm wine stain birthmark on the nape of his neck who took part in one of the gang's raids on a Delhaize supermarket in Beersel on the southern outskirts of Brussels in October 1983.

A special extension to the statute of limitations on the case runs out in 2025, by which time the core members of the gang would be in their mid seventies at least, if still alive.

On 28 June 2024, the investigation into the case was officially closed.

Federal prosecutors in Belgium announced on 28 January 2025 that a new lead emerged in the investigation and the criminal probe is ongoing. On 27 January 2025, a civil party in the city of Mons appealed to the courts and asked for two additional witnesses to be heard, and the appeal was approved. The two witnesses were present at the time of the Aalst attack on 9 November 1985.

== In the media ==
- In 2018 Stijn Coninx directed the Belgian film Don't Shoot (Niet Schieten), screenplay by Stijn Coninx and Rik D'Hiet. It is based on the last, 9 November 1985, bloody raid by the Brabant Killers on the Delhaize Supermarket in Aalst. Eight innocent people were murdered, among whom were Gilbert and Thérèse Van de Steen and their daughter Rebecca. Their nine-year-old son David although critically injured in the leg, survived the shooting and was raised by his grandparents. It follows the 25-year-long battle of David's grandfather, Albert (played by Jan Decleir), to bring the killers to justice.
- In 2023, Belgian television channels Eén and La Une aired 1985, a television series created by Wouter Bouvijn and Willem Wallyn focusing on the Brabant killers. A bilingual co-production between public broadcasters VRT and RTBF of Dutch-speaking Flanders and French-speaking Wallonia respectively, the series offers a coming-of-age crime drama perspective, following three youths — Marc, Vicky and her brother Franky — as they navigate the tumultuous early 1980s in Brussels, becoming entangled in the intrigue surrounding the gang, with diverging allegiances and the historical backdrop adding complexity. The series features notable Belgian music from the late 1970s to early 1980s, along with music from foreign artists such as The Psychedelic Furs, Gruppo Sportivo and The Clash.
- In early 2024, philosopher Ernesto de Montisalbi discusses the Brabant Killers in his novel Grievous Reminiscence, presenting them as a moral counterbalance to other criminal figures from the 1960s to the 1990s. He highlights striking similarities in facial features and modus operandi between members of this notorious gang and figures such as Salvatore Riina, Bernardo Riina, Matteo Messina Denaro, Bernardo Provenzano, Vincenzo Puccio and Pino Greco. This comparative analysis constructs a narrative that critically examines the ethical implications of their potential motivations and simultaneously scrutinizes the competence of the investigators in resolving their respective cases. It also interrogates the origins of malevolence, awareness of transgression, and the capacity for clemency towards perpetrators of criminal acts.

== See also ==
- List of fugitives from justice who disappeared
- Operation Gladio
- White Uno Gang - A similar phenomenon in Italy
