= ICOMP =

ICOMP may refer to:

- Intel Comparative Microprocessor Performance index, an index, published by Intel, used to measure the relative performance of its microprocessors
- Initiative for a Competitive Online Marketplace a Microsoft backed lobbying group
