= PCPM =

PCPM may refer to:

- Personal CP/M, a Digital Research operating system
- Political-Military Communist Party
- Pontifical Commission for the Protection of Minors
- Potsdam Center for Policy and Management
- Progressive Conservative Party of Manitoba
