= Sociology is a Martial Art =

Sociology is a Martial Art (original title in French La sociologie est un sport de combat) is a French documentary film released in 2001, directed by Pierre Carles and conceived by the latter as an attempt to make sociology known, and more particularly the work of sociologist Pierre Bourdieu.

== Synopsis ==
Sociology is a Martial Art shows how Pierre Bourdieu works, “thinking in action” and what the daily life of a sociologist is made of. To date, the work has never been broadcast on French television.

== Technical sheet ==
- Director: Pierre Carles
- Producer: Véronique Frégosi and Annie Gonzalez
- Production company: CP Productions and VF Films
- Distribution company: Cara M.
- Editor: Virginie Charifi, Youssef Charifi, Claire Painchault and Bernard Sasia
- Type: Documentary
- Duration: 2 h 26
- Release date: May 2, 2001

== Featuring ==
- Pierre Bourdieu
- Loïc Wacquant
- Serge Halimi
- Daniel Mermet
- Rémi Lenoir
- Patrick Champagne
- Edward Said

== Bibliography ==
Gérôme Truc, "When sociologists make their cinema: Cross analysis of Sociology is a combat sport and the journey of a sociologist", Conversely, vol. 2, 2004, p. 44-66.
