= Communist Combatant Cells =

Belgian terrorist group

Cellules Communistes Combattantes CCC
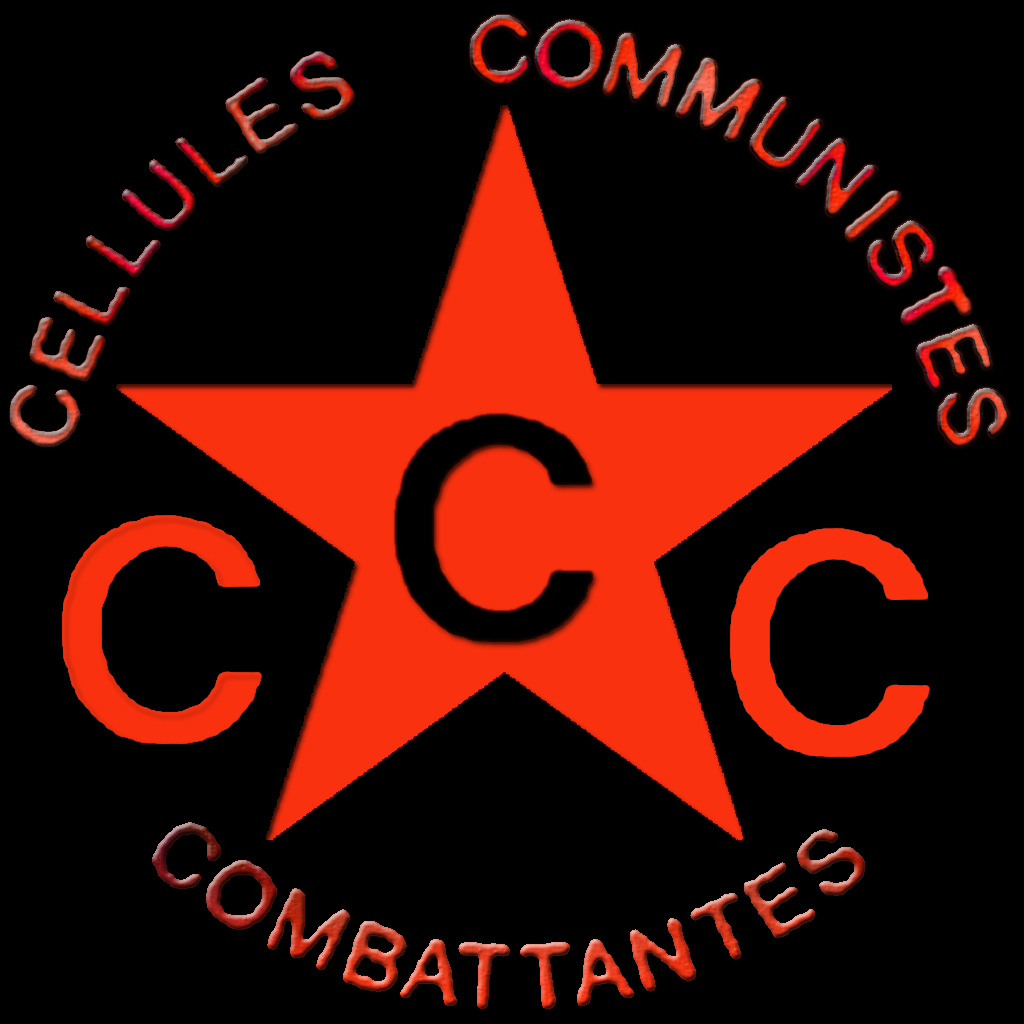
- Logo of the CCC
- Leaders: Pierre Carette and Bertrand Sassoye
- Dates active: 1983–January 1986
- Active regions: Belgium
- Ideology: Communism; Marxism-Leninism
- Political position: Far-left
- Status: Inactive

Cellules Communistes Combattantes (CCC; Communist Combatant Cells, also known as Fighting Communist Cells) was a Belgian communist urban guerrilla organization.

The cells were active for less than two years in the mid-1980s; primarily engaged in bombings within Belgium's borders. CCC attacked perceived enemies of communism, specifically NATO, US and other international businesses and the Federation of Belgian Enterprises. During the brief time they were active CCC carried out 26 bombings against NATO, American, German and Belgian targets. The Cellules Communistes Combattantes primarily targeted property rather than human representatives of capitalism, NATO, etc., and warned authorities ahead of an attack. Nevertheless, CCC bombings led to several injuries and two deaths.

Of the 26 bombings carried out by CCC, six were against US targets, including Honeywell and Bank of America. When they bombed a Honeywell office on October 8, 1984 they issued a statement accusing Honeywell of being "among the 20 principal military collaborators in the USA".

The CCC's spate of bombings in 1985, as well as the unrelated Brabant killings at the time, shook this otherwise tranquil country and created widespread security concerns. The government decided to deploy about 1,000 soldiers from the Belgian army as part of PM Wilfried Martens' security plan.

In December 1985, police arrested CCC leader and founder Pierre Carette and others, in an American-styled burger restaurant. Carette's conviction on 14 January 1986 essentially eliminated the CCC.

Pierre Carette was released from prison in February 2003. In 2008, Carette and Bertrand Sassoye were arrested again on parole violations and connections to the Italian terrorist group Partito Comunista Politico-Militare, but they were released by the court a few days later, on 18 June.

== Convicted members ==
- Pierre Carette
- Bertrand Sassoye
- Pascale Vandegeerde
- Didier Chevolet
- Didier Sampieri

== Attacks ==
- 2 October 1984 – attack against the American company Litton Industries in Evere, on the 2nd anniversary of the Litton Industries bombing in Canada
- 3 October 1984 – attack on the German company MAN AG in Groot-Bijgaarden
- 8 October 1984 – attack on the American company Honeywell in Evere
- 15 October 1984 – attack on the Paul Hymans institute (a liberal organization in Ixelles)
- 17 October 1984 – attack on the CVP party bureau in Ghent
- 26 October 1985 – attack on the Belgian military base in Bierset
- 11 December 1984 – attack on NATO pipelines in Ensival, Gages, Gastuche, Glaaien and Itter
- 15 January 1985 – attack on a NATO/SHAPE support group in Woluwe-Saint-Lambert
- 1 May 1985 – attack on the Federation of Belgian Enterprises, killing two firefighters and wounding 13 others
- 6 May 1985 – attack on the Belgian police in Woluwe-Saint-Lambert
- 8 October 1985 – attack on the Belgian company Sibelgaz in Laeken
- 12 October 1985 – attack on the Belgian company Fabrimetal in Charleroi
- 19 October 1985 - attack on the Belgian company Infosermi in Namen
- 20 October 1985 - attack on the car of Pierre Galand
- 4 November 1985 – attack on the Belgian company BBL in Etterbeek
- 4 November 1985 – attack on the American company Manufacturers Hanover Corporation
- 4 November 1985 – attack on the Belgian company Generale Bank in Charleroi
- 5 November 1985 – attack on the Belgian company KB Bank in Leuven
- 5 November 1985 – attack on the American company Motorola in Watermael-Boitsfort
- 4 December 1985 – attack on the American company Bank of America in Antwerp
- 6 December 1985 – attack on a NATO pipeline in Wortegem-Petegem

== See also ==
- Communist terrorism
- Gang of Nivelles
- Revolutionary Front for Proletarian Action
- Westland New Post
- Bloedrood
