= Pierre Carles =

French Filmmaker

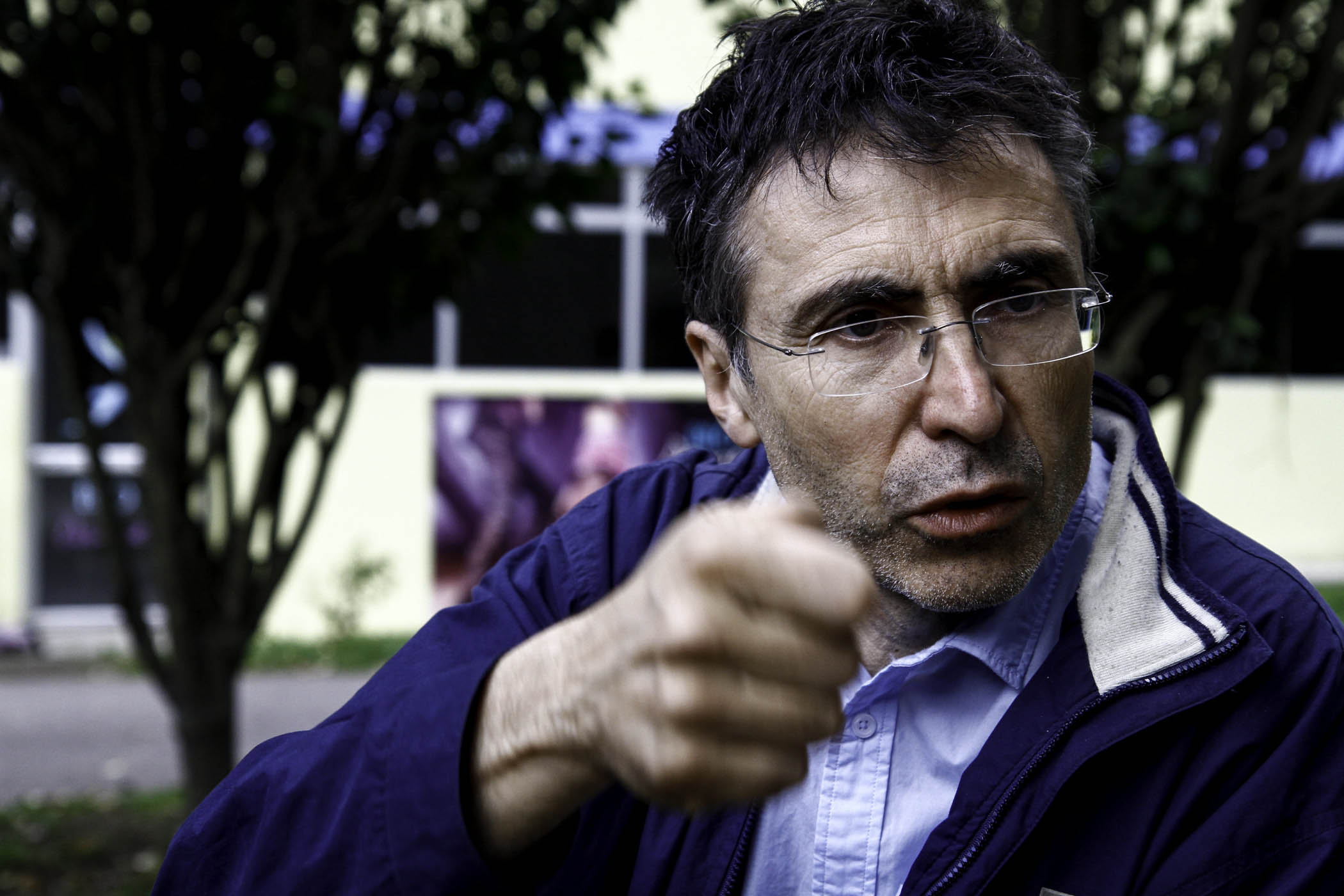
Pierre Carles in Ecuador in 2015

Pierre Carles is a French documentary filmmaker. He has been compared to Michael Moore for his use of the documentary form to denounce mainstream media, which he accuses of having conflicts of interest.

== Filmography ==
- Juppé, forcément, 1995, on the role of regional media during the election of Alain Juppé as mayor of Bordeaux.
- Pas vu pas pris, 1998, ordered then censored by Canal Plus.
- La sociologie est un sport de combat, 2001, on Pierre Bourdieu.
- Enfin pris?, 2002, a sequel to Pas Vu Pas Pris.
- Attention danger travail, (co-directed with Christophe Coello et Stéphane Goxe), 2003
- Volem rien foutre al païs, (co-directed with Christophe Coello et Stéphane Goxe), 2006 (including scenes on the Dinero gratis group in Barcelona or the okupa movement in Spain. Theme of the film is on how to make a living without working: anti-work)
- Ni vieux, ni traîtres, (co-directed with Georges Minangoy), 2006, about Action directe, a far left terrorist group.
- Le Désarroi esthétique, 2006, on the publicist Daniel Robert.
- Fin de Concession, 2011, about TF1.
- Opération Correa: Les ânes ont soif, 2014, about the French medias' stance on Ecuador's president Rafael Correa.
