= Georges Besse =

French businessman (1927–1986)

- Born: 25 December 1927; Clermont-Ferrand, France
- Died: 17 November 1986 (aged 58); Paris, France
- Cause of death: Assassination
- Education: École polytechnique Mines ParisTech
- Occupation: Businessman

Georges Besse (French pronunciation: [ʒɔʁʒ(ə) bɛs]; 25 December 1927 – 17 November 1986) was a French businessman who helped lead several large state-controlled companies. He was assassinated outside his Paris home in front of one of his children by the armed group Action Directe while he was the CEO of car manufacturer Renault.

== Résumé ==
- 1958: General manager of USSI Ingénierie, a uranium enrichment firm
- 1964: Assistant general manager of CIT-Alcatel
- 1974: President of Eurodif
- 1978: Chairman of COGEMA
- 1982: Director of Pechiney-Ugine-Kulmann
- 1985: Director of Renault

=== Renault ===
Besse became the head of the public-owned Renault automaker in January 1985. He was credited with taking the money-losing company to reporting a profit only two months before he was gunned down. He was criticized because his plan to make the bloated enterprise efficient included closing plants and laying off 21,000 workers. Labour unions opposed his actions in Europe, as well as his support for Renault's investments in the United States, such as American Motors (AMC), which was also financially unsound. It invested resources into AMC for launching new Jeep vehicles, upgrading to fuel injection for updated 2.5 L and 4.0 L AMC engines, as well as a new factory in Brampton, Ontario. While some Renault executives and labor leaders perceived AMC with negative bias, Besse championed the future in the North American market just as Jeep four-wheel drives were riding an unprecedented surge in demand. Not only did Besse make Renault profitable, but AMC was also on course to profitability with growing markets and sales.

== Assassination ==
Besse was shot at about 20:25 in the evening of 17 November 1986 while walking on the pavement at the front steps of his 18th-century villa at 16 Boulevard Edgar Quinet in Paris' 14th Arrondissement, the Montparnasse district. It was witnessed by one of his daughters, who observed the street from an upstairs window while waiting for his 20:30 return.

Besse's killers approached just as he alighted from his chauffeur-driven car a short distance from his home. Witnesses said he was shot four to six times, in the head and in the chest, dying almost immediately when he fell on the pavement. Reports varied on whether the assailants escaped by car, motorcycle, or on foot.

Leaflets by the militant anarchist organization Action Directe were sent three months later. The organization claimed responsibility for the murder, stating the murder was in retaliation for his reforms of the financially stricken automaker Renault which involved laying off a large number of workers. However, the Action Directe members denied any responsibility during their trial.

Two women, Nathalie Ménigon and Joëlle Aubron, were charged with his murder in March 1987 and were sentenced to life imprisonment in 1989. Two other Action Directe members, Jean-Marc Rouillan and Georges Cipriani, were convicted as accomplices and also sentenced to life imprisonment.

== Commemoration ==
Renault's car assembly plant in Douai in northern France, was renamed in Besse's honour.

The Georges Besse gaseous diffusion uranium enrichment plant was operated by COGEMA (later AREVA) from 1979 to 2012 at Tricastin, then replaced by the Georges Besse II centrifuge enrichment plant.

== See also ==
- American Motors Corporation (AMC)
- List of assassinations
