= Westland New Post =

Former Belgian extreme right-wing organisation

Westland New Post (WNP) was a Belgian neo-nazi organization founded in 1973 by Paul Latinus and members of the Front de la Jeunesse, a private Belgian militia. It has been cited by several news publications and outlets as, either being responsible for or having a link to, the Brabant killings, a series of violent attacks that occurred in the Belgian province of Brabant between 1982 and 1985. Others have linked the group's activities to the NATO anti-communism effort Operation Gladio, a clandestine stay-behind network whose main purpose was to prevent the spread of the Soviet Union and the political left in Europe.

== History ==
The origins of the group are alleged by author David Teacher to be around 1973, formed from readers of the fascist publication Nouvel Europe Magazine as well as from members of the right-wing group Front de la Jeunesse. In the BBC documentary Operation Gladio: State Sponsored Terror former WNP member Michel Libert stated that the structure of the group included a Chief of Staff supervising two management groups - one providing financial support and the other providing assistance for "the respective authorities", such as the police or gendarmerie. Libert stated that those at the top of the group were unknown to most members, referred only to as "key people". Libert stated that there were 9 key people, and one known key person was Paul Latinus.

"The World Anti-Communist League couldn't act in all parts of the world. And when they wanted something done, who would they use? Comrades of the same system. [...] We knew we were protected by all possible authorities, depending on the type of mission." Michel Libert, 24 June 1992

According to the documentary, the structure of the group was based on the model of the Schutzstaffel (SS). This included a secret service, code names in German, and grouping members by their age. Branches were formed based on speciality - those who were physically fit were placed in the "action" branch, while others formed the "intelligence" branch. Libert also stated that the group used laboratories in nearby universities to manufacture improvised explosives.

A journalist in the BBC documentary stated that he had met with Paul Latinus for dinner, who had stated he was tasked wtih setting up a clandestine resistance group in Belgium by "certain authorities" whose responsibility was to fight against Soviet penetration into the country and prevent Belgian authorities from collaboration with the Soviets. When pressed on who had asked him to build the group, Latinus claimed it was Belgian State Security as well as the American military Secret Services (presumably the Defense Intelligence Agency).

It was stated by Libert that the group generally did not send its younger members on missions because they could end up with "a bullet between the eyes" or because they might end up compromising the group's secrecy. As a result, Paul Latinus was the go-to person when the group carried out actions.

An unidentified journalist in the BBC Documentary also stated that a Belgian Secret Service inspector codenamed "Colonel" initially admitted to infiltrating the group under the guise of giving them surveillance courses. However, he attended the group wearing a balaclava, was accompanied by a guard, and possessed a membership card for Westland New Post. In addition to the Secret Service Inspector, there was also an official from the European Economic Community Security Services named "Robert". Later, when the inspector was questioned by the unidentified journalist, he admitted that in addition to the surveillance courses he had also given them courses in recruitment and the use of weapons. The person identified as "Robert" stated that he gave the group advice on the use of weapons, including how to kill without leaving a trace.

Speaking of Latinus, Libert stated "Was he paid by the Americans, I can't say, but he was in contact with them". Libert stated that "from 1982 to 1985 there were projects". Coincidentally, the "Bende van Nijvel" or Brabant Killings, a series of brutal murders committed in the Belgian province of Brabant occurred between 1982 and 1985. Several sources named Christiaan Bonkoffsky, a former Gendermerie who was dismissed from an elite police commando unit in 1981, to have been a member or an accomplice of the murderers in the killings. However, saliva and fingerprint evidence taken from Bonkoffsky were not positively matched to samples obtained from the perpetrators in the Brabant killings.

=== Links to NATO "strategy of tension" and Operation GLADIO ===
Author David Teacher in his book Rogue Agents states that the Westland New Post was a recruiting front for fascist private armies headed by Paul Latinus, who also had ties to the Belgian Sûreté de l'Etat (security state). Teacher also states that the WNP gathered support for CEPIC candidates, such as lawyer Jean-Pierre Grafé, who allegedly had reached out to WPN for help on his political campaign. Teacher also claims that along with major Jean-Marie Bougerol and banker Pierre Bonvoisin, Latinus was involved in a planned but unrealized coup attempt in Belgium in 1973.

Teacher also states that Christian Smets was appointed by his superior Victor Massart to acquire Latinus as a Sûreté informant, who in turn introduced Smets to the WNP. In February 1982, Smets had given the WNP training on surveillance, which was then utilized to stalk and kill two people in the Pastorale murders (see below). This led to enormous public outcry and allegations of Smets being a fascist sympathiser who colluded witn the WNP, with Massart claiming that Smets had acted on his own without prior authorisation. Teacher claims that by exposing Smets' involvement in the scandal, Smets' investigation—which was intended to look into Pierre Bonvoisin's alleged funding of extreme right-wing groups like the WNP—was covered up by Smets' scandal with the group.

Teacher states that the investigations into Operation Gladio revealed that Victor Massart was the principal contact for the security services and particularly Jean-Marie Bougerol of the Public Information Office (PIO). The PIO was originally set up by Defence Minister and AESP member Paul Vanden Boeyants as a counter-subversion and propaganda service, which Latinus was later recruited into. It was stated that Bougerol was visiting Massart despite the fact the PIO had been officially closed down, and that Bougerol then continued to view Sûreté files through his secretary Mirèze Legon which was illegal. Smets' investigation into this illegal relationship was "too close for comfort" according to Teacher.

Teacher also states that Bougerol was close personal friends with fascist Lecerc and gave lectures to WNP and Front de la Jeunesse. In 1984, these scandals were starting to become key political issues with the public due to revelations around WNP and also a 1981 report detailing links between CEPIC and fascist publication Nouvel Europe Magazine, as well as the scandal around the WNP which culminated in the suicide of Latinus in April 1984.

Teacher also links the similarities behind existing "stay-behind networks" and WNP's own "action" units. Teacher supported these claims by saying that NATO had already covertly recruited sympathetic right-wing groups in countries such as Italy and Greece to carry out NATO activities on a ground level in order to promote their "strategy of tension".

== Pastorale murders ==
Marcel Barbier, a WNP member, was convicted in May 1987 for a gruesome double murder on the la rue de la Pastorale in Anderlecht on February 18, 1982. One of the victims, Alphonse Vandermeulen, had been married to Barbier's current girlfriend, Marcelle Gobert. The police interrogated Barbier and his girlfriend, and searched both of their homes, but no arrests were made. The police investigation into the murders saw no success until August 16, 1983, when a violent incident occurred at Barbier's home in Saint-Gilles. Barbier was arrested, and when the police searched his home they found confidential NATO material, various weapons and neo-Nazi material. It also turned out that Barbier was a former member of the Front de la Jeunesse, and was currently a member of a neo-Nazi organization called Chevalerie teutonique. Barbier was convicted and jailed for this violent incident, and a further investigation into the Pastorale murders was launched.

During the interrogation of Barbier, the police found out about Westland New Post. However, it later turned out that the WNP was already known to the Belgian State Security Service and that they had placed a mole into the organization as early as 1981, though they had not conveyed this information to the police. The police then focused their investigation on member of the WNP to determine if they were a private militia. Paul Latinus, who was questioned by the police, told them that Barbier and another WNP member were behind the murders, and that Latinus had merely helped Barbier get rid of the murder weapon and other relevant evidence. Barbier was the only person convicted for this murder, although other WNP members' involvement was suspected. In 1989, WNP member Christian Elnikoff claimed that he had committed the crime on Latinus' orders and that Marcel had made a false confession, also under Latinus' orders.

== NATO documents ==
During the investigation into the incident at Barbier's home, the police found confidential NATO documents. Barbier told the police that they were not his and belonged to another WNP member, Michel Libert. Libert worked as a military volunteer at the NATO Transmission Centre in Evere at the time. Latinus, leader of WNP, was interrogated multiple times by the police and would confess to stealing confidential NATO documents. Security at the Evere centre was not high, and Libert delivered the documents to Latinus, who later published some of the material in the two editions of the WNP Althing magazine, which was delivered to military personnel, among others. Latinus told the police that this was on behalf of his 'American superiors' in order to bring NATO's awareness to how easy it was to obtain such confidential documents. It would later turn out that more WNP members worked at the NATO Transmission Centre and would deliver material to Latinus via Libert.

== Connection to the Brabant killers ==
Several authors and outlets have alleged links between the WNP and the Brabant Killings from the date of the attacks up to the 2020s. Author David Teacher asserts in the book Rogue Agents that the killings were linked to WNP despite contrary statements by Belgian authorities, who claimed that the killers were motivated solely by monetary gain.

Teacher states that due to the military-type precision of the attacks (targeting people only within the Brabant Wallon area, the use of military-type weaponry, meticulously planned attacks and getaways) and the relatively low amounts of currency stolen in the heists, the group's attacks were instead meant to be provocative in nature and promote NATO's strategy of tension. The goal was to invoke a general feeling insecurity in the population through the attacks to justify the instation of a strong, authoritarian regime, which could curb the rising of left-wing parties and progression of the USSR into Europe after World War II.

Teacher also states that multiple investigations into the killings have pointed to WPN sympathizers within the Belgian Gendarmerie. As an example, he states that the killers broke into a warehouse to steal bulletproof vests - however, the production of the vests had only recently begun at the warehouse and was only known to the Gendarmerie at that point. He also stated that the killers employed a tactic known as "practical shooting", which was well-known within the Gendarmiere's anti-terrorist unit.

Martin Leukeu, a former member of the Gendarmerie's anti-terrorist Diane unit, alleged that he was recruited into "Group G", a secretive neo-nazi organisation within the Gendarmerie. In the BBC Documentary Operation Gladio: State Sponsored Terror, Michel Libert stated that Group G was a "separate" faction but still considered a part of Westland New Post. Leukeu stated that many in the Diane shared his convictions as a fascist, used the nazi salute, and discussed plans to violently destablise Belgium and instate an authoritarian regime.

Leukeu stated that Group G was responsible for the theft of Diane's weapons, which he though was likely carried out by the Gendarme and fellow WNP member Madani Bouhouche. Leukeu claimed that Group G was not only responsible for carrying out the killings in Brabant, but also was involved in targeting fellow Gendarmerie colleagues who were investigating the crimes of WNP members, such as the 1981 attack on major Herman Vernaillen, who had been investigating fraud scandals linked to the group.

Teacher's central premise around the Brabant murders is that they were not only used as a part of the strategy of tension but also served a practical means of executing members of CEPIC, the right wing of the Christian Democrat party who were implicated in a prior coup attempt in 1973. He states that the killing at "Restaurant Aux Trois Candards" in Ohain was a regular "haunt" of Paul Vanden Boeynants, who allegedly visited there with former gendarmieres as well as Elise Dewit and Jacques Fourez, victims of a previous shooting in Colruyt Nijvel on 17 September 1973. The allegation that Dewit and Fourez were members of CEPIC has also been promoted by investigative reporting outlet PALA.

Publication P-Magazine published a differing account, stating that a secret Gendarmerie report alleged that Dewit and Fourez were "annoying witnesses" who were liquidated because they had incriminating information on Gendarmerie, including a videotape, that would make them susceptible to blackmail. Paul Ponsaers' 1988 documentary The Gang stated that police at the time thought that Fourez and Dewit merely happened to be near the Colruyt supermarket on the day of the attack and were shot to avoid leaving behind witnesses.

The documentary also stated that Dewit's mother refuted the idea that they had the habit of filling up their car at the Colruyt gas station, saying that Fourez was "familiar with his car and its fuel consumption" but that he was also "a mysterious character" who had been secretly living with Dewit for 10 years. The documentary does, however, acknowledge both as being businesspeople, with Fourez owning several businesses such as a construction company, and Dewit owning a hotel in Brussels.

In October 2014, the Belgian police apprehended Michel Libert, the former second-in-command of the organization. He was interrogated as a suspect in the Brabant killers case and his house was searched. The Belgian public television station RTBF alleged that Westland New Post had performed reconnaissance actions on the stores that later would be attacked by the Brabant killers. Libert had previously been interviewed several times as a witness. He left the court as a free man. The search of his house did not reveal anything that pointed to a possible connection with the Brabant Killers.

== Relations with the Belgian State Security Service ==
Westland New Post was infiltrated by an agent of the Belgian State Security Service, Christian Smets. Smets already knew Paul Latinus, as Latinus previously worked as informant for the State Security to report on the activities of the "extreme left". He was also an agent for an undisclosed American intelligence service. Latinus himself had previously applied for a position as a State Security agent, successfully passing the first exam. However, he fled to Chile on his own initiative in January 1981 when the magazine Pour published an article depicting him as an "extreme-rightist" infiltrating "extreme left" organizations. Latinus returned to Belgium some time later, and founded WNP with Marcel Barbier and Michel Libert.

In the organizational structure of WNP, Christian Smets was responsible for operational details, and taught the members surveillance and intelligence gathering. One exercise of Smets supposedly took place just before the Pastorale murders, during which members were tasked with foreshadowing one of the future victims in the attacks. Smets himself denied this allegation in a later parliamentary testimony, though admitted giving intelligence exercises.

The last contact between Smets and WNP occurred in June 1982, when Smets was transferred to the Brussels sector of the Secret Services, becoming responsible for VIP protection. Around this time Latinus stopped being an informant for State Security, though Michel Libert's relaionship with them would continue. According to Libert, Smets wrote an article in the anti-communist Nouvel Europe Magazine in March 1983 on the topic of "State Security prepares an extreme-right coup d'état?". Shortly after the Barbier incident the State Security reportedly severed all connections with Libert as well as with WPN as a whole.

== Latinus' suicide ==
The Belgian police found the dead body of Paul Latinus in the evening of April 24, 1984 at the home of his girlfriend in Court-Saint-Étienne. The police found him lying on the floor of a basement, with strangulation marks around his neck but no other signs of violence or disorder. They found a telephone cord that was cut. The girlfriend explained to the police that she found him when she came home from a bar, and that she cut the line between Latinus' head and the ceiling from which he was hanging.

The next day a judge ordered Latinus' house to be searched. His girlfriend was again interrogated, who told the police that Latinus had a file called Pinon which had information on certain 'partouzes' involving high-placed functionaries and minors. She stated that she had burned the file after having shown it to an acquaintance. An autopsy was made that same day on the body of Latinus. The acquaintance in question was later found to have moved to Spain and was therefore not questioned.

During the investigation into the death of Latinus, several WNP members expressed disbelief that he had committed suicide. They found it more plausible that it was a camouflaged murder instead as he reportedly held compromising information on other people. Forensic tests were carried out in the basement of Latinus' house in the winter of 1985 to investigate the possibility of foul play - however, nothing conclusive came from this. The investigative team eventually closed Latinus' case in the autumn of 1986.

In 1998, the remains of Latinus were exhumed by authorities to determine if there was any link between him and the Brabant killers. No such link was found from Latinus' DNA sample.

== See also ==
- Communist Combatant Cells
- Brabant Killers

== Literature ==
- René HAQUIN, Des taupes dans l'extrême droite - La Sûreté de l'Etat et le WNP, avec une postface de Walter de Bock, EPO, Anvers-Bruxelles, 1985.
- Hugo GIJSELS, L’enquête – Vingt années de déstabilisation en Belgique, éditions de la Longue Vue, Bruxelles, traduit du néerlandais, 1990.
- Philippe BREWAEYS & Jean-Frédérick DELIÈGE, de Bonvoisin et Cie - De Liège à Bruxelles, les prédateurs et l’Etat, éditions EPO, Anvers-Bruxelles, 1992.
- Christian CARPENTIER & Frederic MOSER, La Sûreté de l'Etat - Histoire d'une déstabilisation, Quorum, Gerpinnes, 1993.
- Victor MASSART, Les dés étaient pipés - Conspirations à la Sûreté de l'Etat, Quorum, Ottignies LLN, 1997.
- Claude MONIQUET, Les Dossiers noirs de la Belgique, éditions Michel Lafon, Neuilly-sur-Seine, 1999.
- Dirk BARREZ, Le pays des 1000 scandales - Un quart de siècle d'affaires en Belgique, Quorum, Gerpinnnes, 1998.
