= CEPIC =

European industry group

Center of the Picture Industry
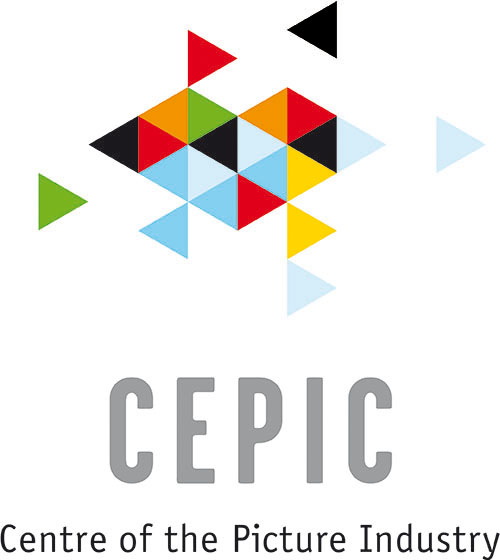
- Abbreviation: CEPIC
- Formation: 1993
- Legal status: European Economic Interest Grouping (EEIG)
- Purpose: Picture Industry
- Location: Fritschestraße 22, D-10585 Berlin, Germany
- Region served: Europe and worldwide
- President: Alfonso Gutiérrez
- Website: cepic.org

CEPIC, from CEnter of the PICture industry (former: Coordination of European Agencies Press Stock Heritage), is a registered European Economic interest Grouping (EEIG) and international umbrella organization. It representing the interests of 11 national Picture Associations in Europe and further individual Agencies in EU-Institutions and international organizations.

== History ==
CEPIC was founded in Berlin in 1993, where it still has its Head Office. In 1997, it received Observer Status at the World Intellectual Property Organization (WIPO). CEPIC was registered in Paris in 1999. In 2006 CEPIC became an associate member of International Press Telecommunications Council (IPTC). Until 2009 CEPIC was known as the Coordination of European Picture Agencies. The change of the name to Centre of the Picture Industry is a result of the advancement to a more global orientation of the organisation.

== Structure ==
Currently, 883 Picture Agencies with about 50,000 photographers are represented by CEPIC. Members of CEPIC are mainly small and medium-sized companies, national museums and archives, which promote professional photography and footage in Press, Culture and Illustration. The 7 members of the CEPIC Committee are elected every 2 years by representatives of the 11 national Picture Associations.

== Goals and Activities ==
CEPIC promotes the exchange of information between Pictures Agencies from all over the world with its annual Congress, which takes place in another European city every year (see below). CEPIC stands for the defense of a balanced market. Contract templates and guidelines for good business relations between photographers, Picture Agencies and users are developed on a regular basis. Together with ICOMP, CEPIC works on the protection of competitive market conditions.

Another main issue is the protection of intellectual property and the payment of photographers. CEPIC speaks up for ethical codes and for the rights of photographers and Picture Agencies.

In 2009, CEPIC issued a critical statement on the US-American Google Book Settlement. This statement was submitted to the European Commission in cooperation with ICOMP, the German Book Trade Association (Börsenverein des Deutschen Buchhandels), the Internet Archive/Open Book Alliance and EBLIDA.

CEPIC is, furthermore, active in the discussion about so-called Orphan Works and supports a sector specific solution. To prevent pictures from becoming orphan works, CEPIC recommends the improvement of legal and technological means of protection.

== Members ==
The 11 national Associations are:

- Germany
  - BVPA – Bundesverband der Pressebild-Agenturen und Bildarchive
- France
  - FNAPPI – Fédération Nationale des Agences de Presse Photos et Information
  - SAPHIR – Syndicat National des Agences Photographiques d'Information et de Reportage
  - SNAPIG – Syndicat National des Agences Photographiques d'Illustration Générale
- Netherlands
  - NL image
- Portugal
  - APAAI – Associaco Portuguesa das Agencias e Arquivos de Imagens
- Sweden
  - BLF – Bildleverantörernas Förening
  - SBF – Svensk Bildbyraförening
- Switzerland
  - SAB – Schweizerische Arbeitsgemeinschaft der Bild-Agenturen und-Archive
- Spain
  - AEAPAF – Asociacion Empresarial de Agencias de Prensa y Archivos Fotograficos
- United Kingdom
  - BAPLA – British Association of Picture Libraries and Agencies

The individual picture agencies are from Andorra, Germany, Finland, France, United Kingdom, Ireland, Israel, Italy, Norway, Austria, Poland, Romania, Russia, Spain, Czech Republic, Turkey, Hungary and the United States.

== Annual congress ==
The annual CEPIC Congress is the largest picture agents event in the world. It brings together about 1,000 delegates and 400 companies from 52 countries of 5 continents. Experts present reports and discuss Image Copyright, Indexing and Internet marketing among other issus. Further subjects are the challenge of the New Media, the situation of the Picture Market, its constant changes, as well as new technologies and footage.

== See also ==
- GLAM
