= Front de la Jeunesse (Belgium) =

The Front de la Jeunesse (FJ) was a Belgian private militia. It was founded in 1973 by members of one of the so-called NEM-Clubs, situated around the Nouvel Europe Magazine.

== History ==
In an interview with the BBC, the head of Front de la Jeunesse, Francis Dossogne stated "The Front De Jeunesse was born in 1974 and existed until the 80s. In the interview itself, about the founding of Front de la Jeunesse, Dossogne stated:

"At times, it was a political group, at times militant, extreme right wing. But essentially it was a militant youth movement. The Front de la Jeunesse carried out actions which upset things. It put many things into question, things which were well established." Francis Dossogne, 24 June 1992

Dossogne also stated that the group included members of the Belgian Gendarmerie, the paramilitary police force, who formed a part of the group named "Group G" which was a part of the group but separate from the main members. Several people in the documentary state that not only were the Gendermerie involved in the group, but that the headquarters of the organisation were organising it.

The BBC documentary also stated that Paul Latinus also known of in Westland New Post, was implanted into the group to teach them how to carry out violent attacks, such as attacks on Arab cafes, organising military training camps, and how to carry out surveillance.

A French-Algerian man was killed on December 4, 1980, in Brussels by members of the Front de la jeunesse. This killing provoked a huge anti-racist demonstration in Brussels and Philippe Moureaux, the Justice Minister introduced before the Parliament a project of law against racism, adopted a few months later.

In July 1981, members of the FJ set fire to the publishing building behind the Pour (magazine), after the magazine revealed some information about the internal structures of FJ. This was one of the arson attacks that the group had carried out, with immigrant facilities being the most frequent target of such attacks.

The organization was disbanded in 1983, when many members were convicted for being part of a private militia. Some members of the FJ helped create the neo-Nazi organization Westland New Post in 1981.

== External sources ==
- Front de la jeunesse et Parti des forces nouvelles
