= Federal Police Special Units =

Directorate of the special units of the federal police Dutch: Directie van de speciale eenheden French: Direction des unités spéciales
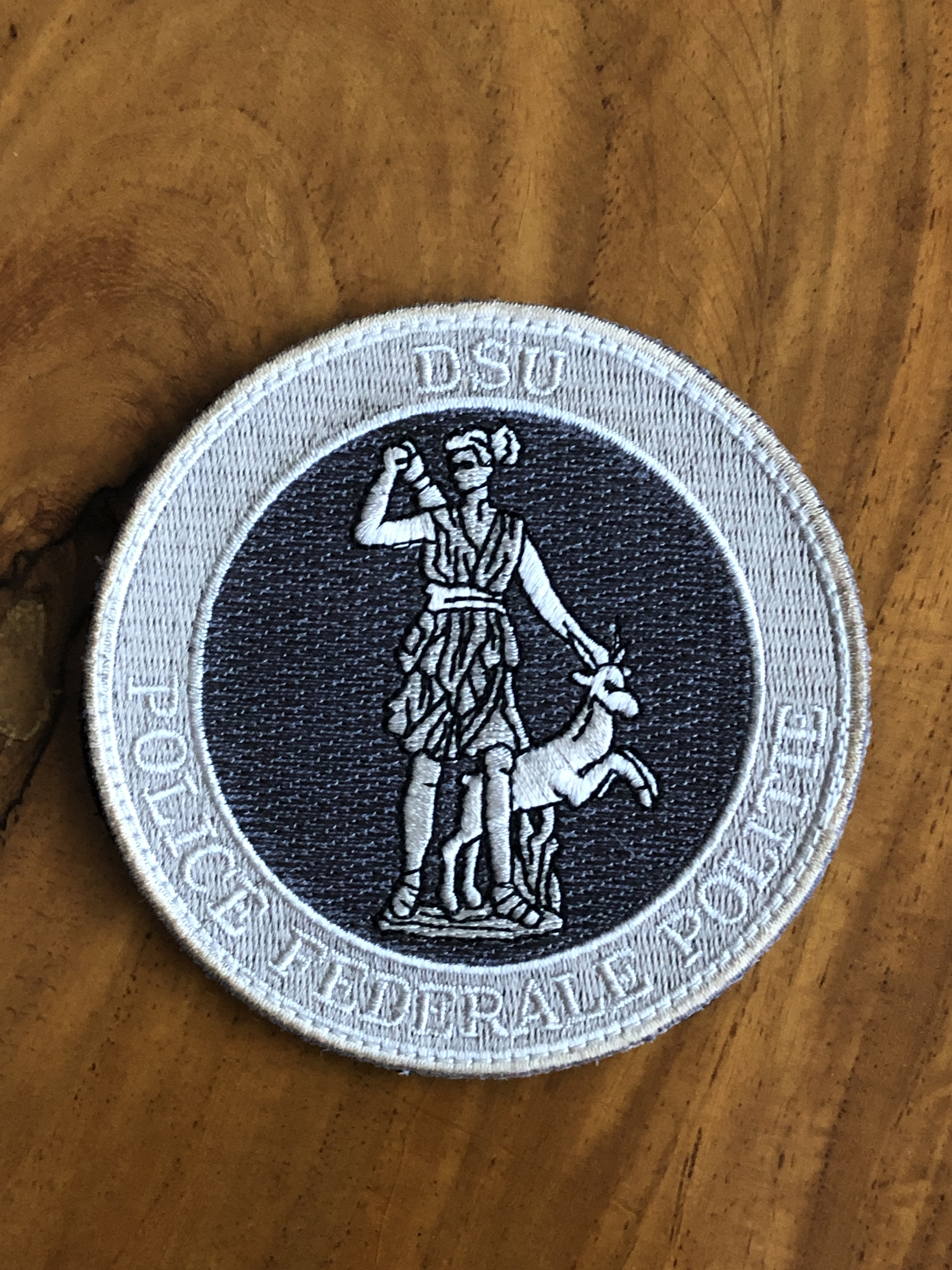
- Gray DSU patch.

Agency overview
- Preceding agency: Directorate of Special Units (DSU), Special Intervention Squadron (SIE/ESI), Group Diane
- Employees: 540 operators (50 in the intervention unit)

Jurisdictional structure
- Federal agency: Belgium
- Operations jurisdiction: Belgium
- General nature: Federal law enforcement; Civilian police
- Specialist jurisdiction: Counter terrorism, special weapons operations; protection of internationally protected persons, other very important persons, or state property

Operational structure
- Parent agency: Belgian Federal Police

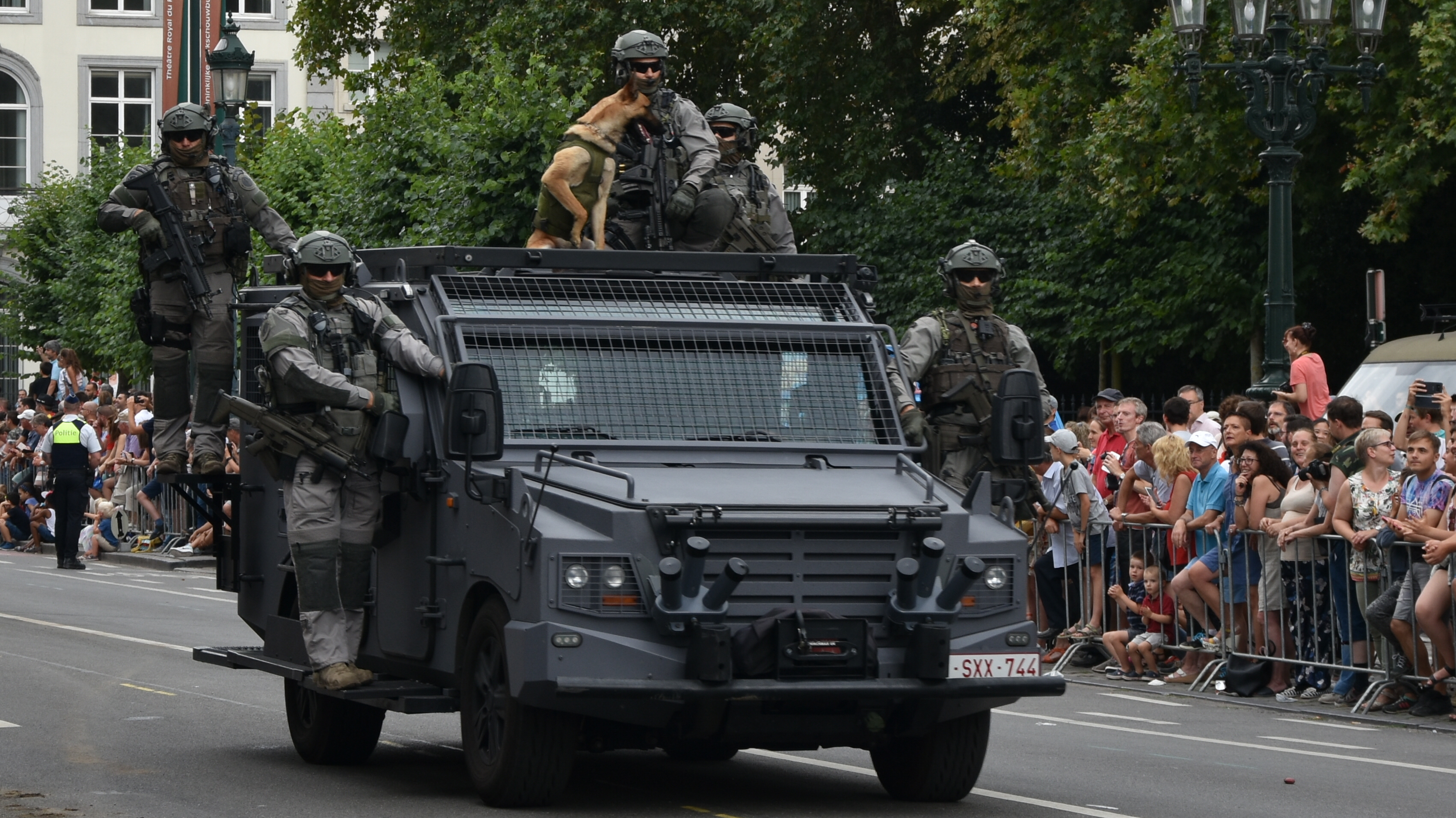
Federal Police Special Units at the parade in Brussels on 21 July 2018

The Directorate of special units (DSU) (Dutch: Directie van de speciale eenheden; French: Direction des unités spéciales; German: Direktion der Sondereinheiten) is the police tactical unit of the Belgian Federal Police. In total, DSU consists of about 500 highly trained police officers. The centralized 50 operator small assault team of the intervention unit of the DSU is deployed in cases of terrorism, kidnappings, hostage taking and other forms of serious crime. DSU performs emergency responses, high-risk arrests and searches, observation operations, undercover operations and more.

Chief commissioner Eric Liévin, one of the DSU's former commanders, states that "a criminal dealing with the DSU, has a better chance of surviving than another; they try to use a minimal level of violence/force, and yet try to attain a maximum level of efficiency."

== History ==
The original DSU was created within the former Rijkswacht/Gendarmerie in 1972 in the aftermath of the Munich massacre and was called Group Diane.

In 1974 the name was changed from Diane to SIE (also outside Belgium, Dutch: Speciaal Interventie Eskadron) or ESI (French: Escadron spécial d'intervention, also known as Groupe interforces antiterroriste).

In the 1980s, the unit operated against pro-leftist groups.

In 2001, all Belgian police forces (municipal, judicial and Rijkswacht/Gendarmerie) were reformed into the integrated police structured on two levels, the local police and the federal police. The SIE/ESI took the form of the Directorate of special units (DSU), which was part of the newly created federal police. In 2007 the DSU was integrated into the Office of the General Commissioner (CG) and its name was changed to CGSU. Due to an optimization reform within the federal police that started in 2014, the special units were moved from the Office of the General Commissioner to the General directorate of the judicial police (DGJ), one of the three general directorates resorting under the Office of the General Commissioner. This was deemed more logical because of the operational and judicial nature of the assignments of the federal police's special units. Subsequently, the name and abbreviation was changed (back) to "Directorate of the special units (DSU)".

The DSU was deployed to hunt down suspects responsible for bombing the Brussels metro and airport with one suspect apprehended.

Its manpower in 2012, consist of 450 police officers and 62 civilians.

On March 18, 2024, DSU officers were targeted by an arms and drug trafficking suspect during a search in Lodelinsart, Charleroi. One agent was killed and two others were seriously and slightly injured. The gunman was also killed.

== Organisation ==
The DSU is one of the four central directorates of the General directorate of the judicial police (DGJ), which is responsible for criminal investigations and anti-crime operations. The DSU consists of centralised units and decentralised units. The centralised units are called the "special units" and consist of:

- the Intervention unit
- the Observation unit
- the Undercover team (UCT)
- the National technical support unit (NTSU)

These are all stationed in a police caserne in Etterbeek.

There are four decentralised units, called "Protection, observation, support & arrest platoons" (POSA), spread over the country:

- POSA Gent
- POSA Antwerpen
- POSA Charleroi
- POSA Liège

Overall control of the DSU lies with the Ministry of Internal Affairs, but depending on circumstances the unit can be deployed under operational control of the Ministry of Justice. Prior to 1994 the unit was commanded by the Ministry of Defense.

Two more specialised units also exist, one team has six trained police dogs (They use Belgian Malinois) for detecting the presence of explosive materials or ammunition, the other one is the Disaster Victim Identification (DVI) team, which was created in 1978 after the Los Alfaques disaster. They've been involved in the Herald of Free Enterprise disaster, the Buizingen rail disaster in 2010 and a bus accident in 2012 in Switzerland.

== Tasks ==
DSU provides ongoing support to the federal and local levels in the areas of:

- Intervention and arrest (hostage and barricaded suspect situations)
- Provision of expertise and advice
- Special investigative techniques
- Specialized technical support
- Support of specialised means (divers, climbers, snipers, maritime operation, etc.)
- Support of the European Anti-terrorism organisation 'Atlas' with the possibility of deployment abroad

== Equipment ==
=== Weapons ===
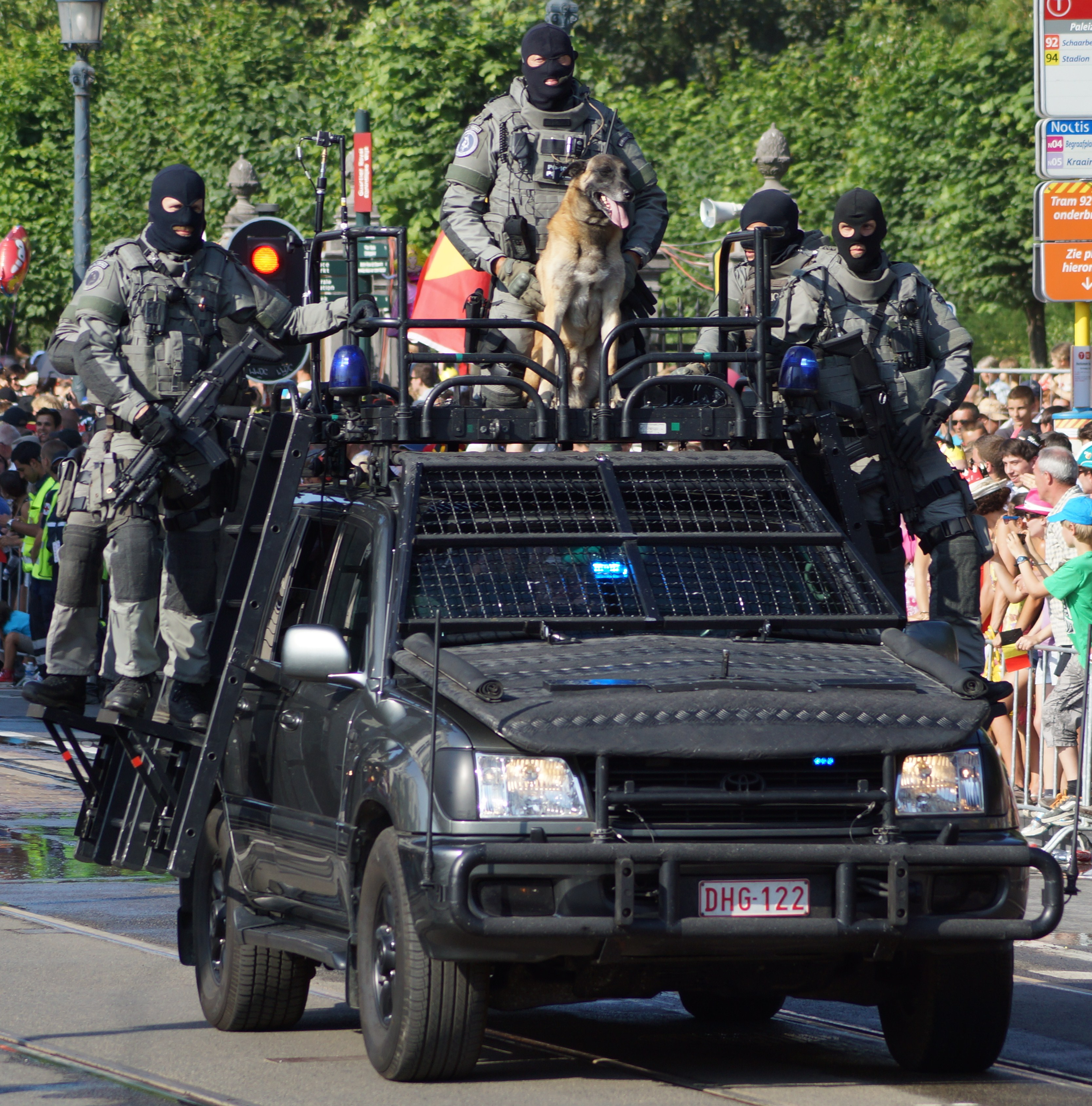
DSU operators on a parade armed with FN SCARs on a Toyota Land Cruiser assault vehicle (in July 2013).

| Weapon | Origin | Type | Notes |
|---|---|---|---|
| Glock 17 | Austria | Semi-automatic pistol | |
| FN Five-seven | Belgium | Semi-automatic pistol | |
| Remington 870 | United States | Shotgun | |
| Heckler & Koch MP5 | Germany | Submachine gun | Sometimes used with suppressors |
| Heckler & Koch UMP | Germany | Submachine gun | |
| FN P90 | Belgium | Submachine gun | Sometimes used with suppressors |
| FN SCAR | Belgium | Assault rifle | Sometimes used with suppressors |
| SIG MCX | United States | Assault rifle | |
| Heckler & Koch G3K | Germany | Assault rifle | |
| Heckler & Koch HK417 | Germany | Battle rifle | |
| Accuracy International Arctic Warfare | United Kingdom | Sniper rifle | |
| Sako TRG-21 | Finland | Sniper rifle | |
| FN 303 | Belgium | Grenade launcher | |
| Heckler & Koch HK69 | Germany | Grenade launcher | |
| SIMON breach grenade | Israel | Rifle grenade | |

=== Gear ===
- UF PRO clothing during training
- Crye Precision clothing during operation OD green
