= Jean-Claude Lutanie =

French writer

Jean-Claude Lutanie is a French writer.

== Biography ==
Jean-Claude Lutanie was born in Poitiers, France in 1951. In the 1970s and 80s, he entered into social protest and contestation, but early on, broke off from any movement in particular. In 1981, he publishes Protestation devant les libertaires du présent et du futur sur les capitulations de 1980 anonymously, followed by Une lecture paranoïaque-critique de La Maison Tellier (Guy de Maupassant) in 1993. Lutanie’s university research focused on the work of Jean-Pierre Brisset. He taught French in Tebessa, Algeria, from 1985 to 1987, before teaching as Professor of Literature and History in a pre-professional high school in La Rochelle until his death, in 2006.

== Bibliography ==
- Harangue des Ciompi à Florence. Rééditée à l'usage des prolétaires de Longwy, (poster, Toulouse, c. 1979, anonymous, no publisher, 60 × 39 cm)
- Protestation devant les libertaires du présent et du futur sur les capitulations de 1980, (poster, Toulouse, 1981, anonymous, no publisher, 65 × 45 cm)
- Protestation devant les libertaires du présent et du futur sur les capitulations de 1980, (1981, anonymous, no publisher, re-published in 2011 by Editions Lutanie)
- Une lecture paranoïaque-critique de La Maison Tellier (Guy de Maupassant), Le Veilleur Éditeur, 1993

== Articles ==
- "Introduction to Jean-Claude Lutanie" by Rachel Valinsky in The Third Rail #7
