= René Audran =

French government official (1929–1985)

René Audran (1929 – Jan 25, 1985) was a senior official of the French Ministry of Defence who was responsible for managing the country's foreign arms sales. He is known for being assassinated on 25 January 1985 by the armed group Action directe (AD) in front of his residence in La Celle-Saint-Cloud.

== Background ==
Audran was a 1950 graduate of the École Polytechnique. At the time of his death, René Audran had attained the rank of Engineer General of the Corps of Armament. He was the Director of International Affairs (DAI) at the General Delegation for Armament (DGA).

== Death ==
On January 25, 1985, Audran was shot eight times in front of his home. He had been involved in arms sales to Iraq during the Iran–Iraq War, which raised suspicions that the Iranian government was involved in his assassination. His assassination occurred a year before Action directe's killing of industrialist Georges Besse who had been involved in nuclear cooperation with Iraq as well. After his death, Audran was awarded the Citation à l'ordre de la Nation. Members of Action directe were trialed and convicted of his murder in 1987.
