= Pierre Carette =

Belgian terrorist

- Born: 21 September 1952 (age 74); Charleroi, Belgium
- Allegiance: Communist Combatant Cells (CCC)
- Criminal charges: Terrorism, Murder
- Penalty: Lifelong imprisonment (released 2003, briefly re-arrested 2008 for parole violation)

Pierre Carette (born 21 September 1952 in Charleroi, Belgium) was the leader of the Belgian extreme-left terrorist group Communist Combatant Cells or CCC. Although Carette was sentenced to lifelong imprisonment for terrorist attacks, he was released in 2003. However, he was briefly arrested again on 5 June 2008 because of a parole violation, but was released by the court on 18 June.

== Life and work ==
Pierre Carette became politically active when establishing a committee striving for the release of captured members of the Red Army Faction (RAF) in West Germany. Before that, he had distributed documents calling for armed struggle against capitalism, including translated RAF pamphlets. In 1982, he published a magazine called "Subversion" for a while. Shortly afterwards, he was a driving force for the establishment of the CCC. Starting in October 1984, this group carried out a series of attacks on political and military targets (but not people), until the apprehension of Carette and three other members in a fastfood restaurant in Namur on 16 December 1985.

The CCC members were brought to trial in 1988. In October 1988, Carette was sentenced to lifelong imprisonment, mainly because of an attack on the building of the Federation of Belgian Enterprises (VBO) in Brussels on 1 May 1985, when two Firefighters were killed in spite of a warning.

On 23 February 2003, Carette was the last CCC-member to be released from prison. In October 2002, he had given an interview to journalists of the VRT television program "Ter Zake" without permission. In September 2003, he confronted Wilfried Martens on the television program "Nachtwacht". Martens was the prime minister of Belgium at the time of the attacks, and even received police protection against the CCC. Carette stated that he still has the same convictions and that his struggle continues.

Pierre Carette was arrested again on 5 June 2008, after police arrested a number of Belgians with ties to the Political-Military Communist Party, which had been plotting terror attacks in Italy. Some of those arrested had been CCC-members, and it was found that he had re-established contact with them, which had been prohibited by his parole conditions. However, as his parole conditions had been modified to allow him to have contact with his CCC associates in a peaceful context, and the police had not bugged his telephone calls with Bertrand Sassoye, there was no way to prove that his contact with Sassoye had been other than peaceful.
