= Action Directe =

Militant leftist group in France (1979–1987)

- Dates active: 1979–1987
- Active regions: France
- Ideology: Anti-Francoism; Marxism-Leninism
- Political position: Far-left
- Status: Defunct
- Size: 180–200 "militants and [close] sympathizers" during its existence

Action Directe (French pronunciation: [aksjɔ̃ diʁɛkt]; AD; lit. 'direct action') was a French far-left terrorist organization which originated in the anti-Franco struggle and the autonomous movement, and was responsible for deadly terrorist attacks in France between 1979 and 1987. The French government banned the group in 1982. During its existence members murdered 12 people and wounded a further 26. It associated at various times with the Red Brigades (Italy), Red Army Faction (West Germany), Prima Linea (Italy), Armed Nuclei for Popular Autonomy (France), Communist Combatant Cells (Belgium), Lebanese Armed Revolutionary Factions, Irish National Liberation Army, and others.

== Elisabeth Van Dyck Command ==
The Elisabeth Van Dyck Command was a branch of AD that assassinated French Army General René Audran, on 25 January 1985. He was the Director of International Affairs (DAI) at the General Directorate for Armament (DGA). The team was named to commemorate Red Army Faction (RAF) member Elisabeth Van Dyck.

The command was created as a combined extension of both the AD and RAF. The AD appeared to take care of the organizational side of the command, and so naming it after a memorialized member of the RAF makes sense if they were seeking to at least publicly have a unified front. Both the RAF and the AD were actively pursuing their shared goal of political autonomy within their home countries, with the RAF based in Germany and the AD in France. These groups' goal of political autonomy did not stop with their own countries however, and they often fought against their own countries' governments in the pursuit of 'political autonomy', or political freedom, for the world's working class.

The command had only one claimed attack, the assassination of French Army General René Audran on 25 January 1985. At the time of his death, Audran was a senior-level official in the French Ministry of Defense, specifically the Corps of Armament. The Elisabeth van Dyck Command took credit for the assassination via letter. In the letter the members explained that they had killed Audran because he was the head of French's foreign arms sales and they believed that his "military and economic function is at the heart of the strategic imperialist project". The project being referred to is what the AD and RAF believed to be NATO and its supporting European countries' goal of homogenizing the world into a capitalist culture, and that as they progressed along this goal it would widen the gap in power and wealth between the upper class and working class.

== Arrests ==
In December 1981, AD member Lahouari Benchellal, known as Farid, was arrested for forging traveler's cheques, which were an important income source for the organization, in Helsinki, Finland. He hanged himself while in the custody of the Finnish Security Intelligence Service in January 1982. AD did not believe Benchellal killed himself, and they named a direct action group after him.

There is an ongoing campaign by some sections of the French far-left calling for the parole of the still imprisoned AD members, who consider themselves political prisoners. In December 2007, Jean-Marc Rouillan was allowed a state of "semi-liberty", able to leave prison for extended periods. In September 2008, a Parisian court called for the revocation of his status after he declared in an interview with L'Express that "I remain convinced that armed struggle is necessary at certain moments of the revolutionary process".

== Legacy ==
A sport climb in Frankenjura, Germany is named Action Directe after the group.

== See also ==
- Lebanese Armed Revolutionary Factions
- Revolutionary Front for Proletarian Action

== Bibliography ==
- Dartnell, Michael (1995). Action Directe: Ultra-Left Terrorism in France 1979-1987. Newberry House, London: Frank Cass and Co LTD. pp. 1–4. ISBN 0-7146-4566-4.
- "France: Government must apply international standards to Action directe four" (PDF). Amnesty International. 31 January 2001.
- Protestation devant les libertaires du présent et du futur sur les capitulations de 1980, Jean-Claude Lutanie, (originally published in 1981 under the pseudonym Un Incontrole, no publisher, re-published in 2011 by Editions Lutanie)
- Segaller, Stephen (1986). "Action Directe, Ideologues of Violence". The Times (London) – via lexisnexis.com.
