= Vitry-aux-Loges =

- Commune
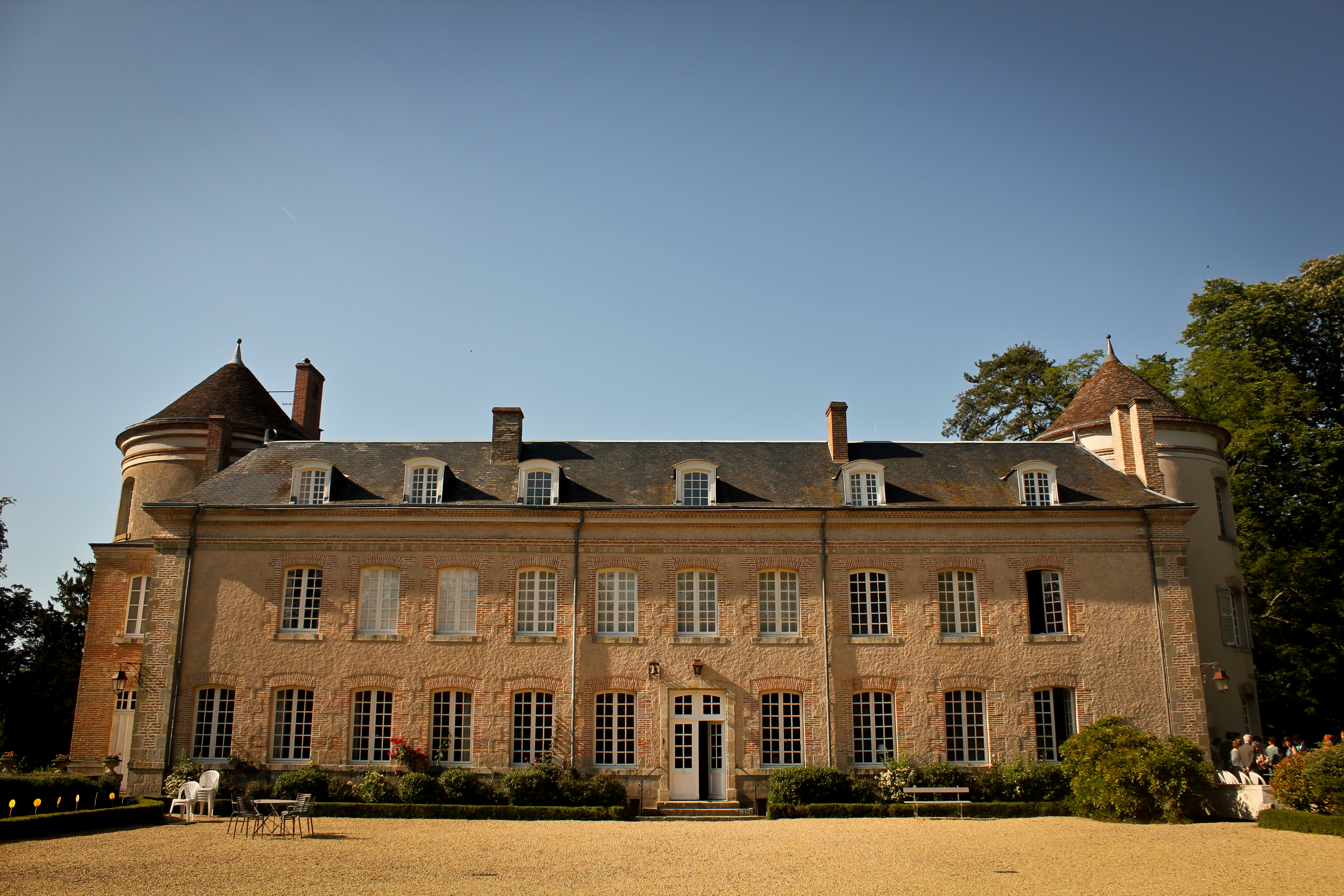
- The Château du Plessis-Loiret, in Vitry-aux-Loges

- Coat of arms
- Location of Vitry-aux-Loges
- Location within France Location within Centre-Val de Loire
- Coordinates: 47°58′41″N 2°15′57″E
- Country: France
- Region: Centre-Val de Loire
- Department: Loiret
- Arrondissement: Orléans
- Canton: Châteauneuf-sur-Loire
- Intercommunality: Loges

Government
  - Mayor (2020–2026): Arnaud de Beauregard
- Area^{1}: 44.06 km^{2} (17.01 sq mi)
- Highest elevation: 138 m (453 ft)
- Lowest elevation: 107 m (351 ft)
- Population (2023): 2,183
  - Density: 49.55/km^{2} (128.3/sq mi)
- Demonym: Vitrylogiens
- Time zone: UTC+01:00 (CET)
  - Summer (DST): UTC+02:00 (CEST)
- INSEE/Postal code: 45346 /45530
- Website: www.vitry-aux-loges.com
- ^{1} French Land Register data, which excludes lakes, ponds, glaciers > 1 km^{2} (0.386 sq mi or 247 acres) and river estuaries.

Vitry-aux-Loges (French pronunciation: [vitʁi o lɔʒ]) is a commune in the Loiret department in north-central France.

== Population ==
Historical population
Year	Pop.	±% p.a.
1968	1,187	—
1975	1,357	+1.93%
1982	1,518	+1.61%
1990	1,622	+0.83%
1999	1,724	+0.68%
2007	1,827	+0.73%
2012	1,900	+0.79%
2017	2,185	+2.83%
2023	2,183	−0.02%
Source: INSEE

== See also ==
- Communes of the Loiret department
