= Group Diane =

Former anti-terrorist unit of Belgian Gendarmerie forces

Group Diane (French: Groupe Diane, Dutch: Groep Diane; known as Brigade Diane in 1973–75) was a former special forces unit of the Belgian Gendarmerie (1974-1976), later known as SIE/ESI. After the dissolution of the Gendarmerie SIE/ESI was later placed under a central direction called CGSU (Commissioner-General direction of Special Units of the federal police, hence CGSU). CGSU was composed of an Intervention Unit (Group Diane, SIE/ESI), an Observation Unit, a Technical Unit and an Undercover Unit. In 2017 a restructuring of the Federal Police placed the direction under the judicial federal police, changing its name to DSU.

The year 2022 was the 50th anniversary of the Intervention Unit of DSU and to celebrate this the Intervention Unit changed its name back to Group Diane.
