= Initiative for a Competitive Online Marketplace =

The Initiative for a Competitive Online Marketplace or ICOMP is a lobbying organisation and based in London with a membership including various publishing and software companies. It exists to lobby legislators to take measures to increase competition in online advertising, to regulate the collection of information about online users and protect the rights of authors and publishers.

The Burson Marsteller public relations firm provides the secretariat for ICOMP and sends out press releases in its name.

The secretariat is directed by the ICOMP council. Members of the Council are appointed by the Directors as laid down in the ICOMP bylaws. The Directors are appointed by the Trustees. Microsoft is the only trustee.

Organisations which support its aims can become members of ICOMP.

== Structure ==
ICOMP comprises two distinct but related bodies referred to as the Secretariat and the Council:

The Secretariat is a UK-registered company which is responsible for the administration and secretariat of ICOMP, and the Council is a group of individuals which determines the policy of ICOMP.

The Secretariat has been set up in a legal form which is commonly used by not-for-profit associations: a UK registered company limited by guarantee. UK companies limited by guarantee do not have a share capital, but have guarantors, also called trustees, who undertake to make a financial contribution towards the winding up of the company in the event of a shortfall upon cessation of business.

The Secretariat of ICOMP has one initial trustee but provision has been made for other trustees to be admitted. One of the advantages of a company limited by guarantee is that it is relatively simple to admit new members or for existing members to leave – there being no share to transfer. The Secretariat has also appointed two directors and a company secretary to administer it.

The Council appoints its own Chair (formerly Lord Alan Watson, as of March 2016 Michael Weber) and has the power to appoint one or more Vice Chairs. There are also rules for the holding of meetings and for the taking of votes at meetings, as well as for the expulsion of members. The Council also sets the level of the financial contributions made by Council Members.

Changes to the by-laws approved by a two-thirds majority are automatic.

== Controversy ==
The Daily Telegraph has described ICOMP as an "organisation whose sole purpose appears to be to attack Google". The Register published an article following the submission of a complaint by Foundem to the European Commission suggesting that an attempt on behalf of Google was to focus on Microsoft's membership of ICOMP to “deflect attention from its antitrust issues” ICOMP legal counsel David Wood submitted a response to these media criticisms, accusing Google of making "seriously misleading statements" about ICOMP, and of "Shooting the messenger to avoid having to deal with unpalatable messages".

As of late 2016, Microsoft no longer financially supports ICOMP. `After Microsoft withdrew its financial support, some voting members also left ICOMP. One such member, Foundem, left due to alleged internal disputes about shifting the sole purpose of ICOMP away from Google's alleged anti-competitive practices. The details of the events leading to Foundem's claims of ICOMP working against a free internet are unknown, but ICOMP has acknowledged that the organisation is "aligning [its] focus to evolving interests of [its] membership."

== ICOMP members in the news ==
Vertical search engine Foundem joined ICOMP in April 2009, after being made subject to a Google AdWords search penalty in June 2006.

The company then created a site named searchneutrality.org (Note: Search Neutrality) to share its experiences as a result of the penalty as well as making the case for what the company refers to as search neutrality – which Foundem defines as “the principle that search engines should be open and transparent about their editorial policies, or, better still, should have no editorial policies other than that their results be comprehensive, impartial, and based solely on relevance.” The Register also wrote a detailed account of Foundem's experiences.

Online news aggregator OneNewsPage (Note: OneNewsPage) joined ICOMP in February 2010 after Google stopped tracking its website in May 2009.

It then created a campaign site called Have I been Penalized? to highlight the challenges an online business can face when it is arbitrarily penalised as a result of search algorithm updates.

ICOMP member The Premier League also attracted media attention following its legal clash with YouTube over alleged copyright infringements. Viacom also submitted a complaint to a US court, which eventually found in favour of Google. Viacom has since appealed against this decision.

The current ICOMP chair as of March 2016, Michael Weber, operates hot-map.com (formerly hot-maps.de). Michael Weber appears notably in the ARD documentary "Die geheime Macht von Google".
