= British Association of Picture Libraries and Agencies =

- Abbreviation: BAPLA
- Formation: 1975
- Legal status: Non-profit company
- Purpose: Picture libraries in the UK
- Location(s): Blackheath, London, SE3
- Region served: UK
- Members: Picture libraries
- Website: BAPLA

BAPLA is the trade association of UK based photographic image suppliers, commercial picture libraries and agencies.

== History ==
The association was formed in 1975 with founding members: Ardea Photographics, Aspect Picture Library, BBC Picture Library, Black Star Publishing Co., Camera Press Ltd, Bruce Coleman Ltd, Colorific Photo Library, Colour Library International, Feature Pix Colour Library, Susan Griggs Agency, Robert Harding Picture Library, Keystone Press Agency, Frank Lane Photographic Agency, Pictor International Ltd, Picturepoint Ltd, Popper Photo Library, Spectrum Colour Library, Tony Stone Associates and Transworld Features.

== Structure ==
Its headquarters is situated on Tranquil Vale in Blackheath, near Blackheath railway station on the B212.

BAPLA is steered by an elected voluntary Executive Board of eight directors.
