= Political-Military Communist Party =

Italian terrorist organization

The Partito Comunista Politico-Militare (PCPM; "Political-Military Communist Party") is an Italian terrorist organization which came to light in 2007, and is linked to the New Red Brigades. 15 members of the PCPM were arrested in a February 2007 raid, including far-left extremist Alfredo Davanzo, who had previously been sentenced to 10 years in prison. In 2012, the second criminal section of Italy's Supreme Court of Cassation definitively dismissed the terrorism charges and confirmed the sentences with reduced sentences inflicted in the appeal processes.
