= Clemente Graziani =

Italian politician (1925–1996)

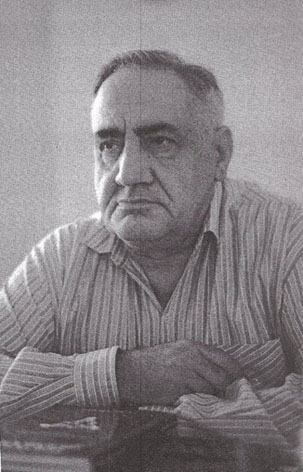
- Born: 17 March 1925; Rome, Italy
- Died: 12 January 1996 (aged 70)
- Organization: Ordine Nuovo

Clemente 'Lello' Graziani (Rome, March 17, 1925 – Asunción, January 12, 1996), was an Italian neofascist politician, one of the founders of the far right think tank Centro Studi Ordine Nuovo and leader of its terrorist spin-off, Movimento Politico Ordine Nuovo.

== Activity in the FAR ==
After the war, where, in the last stages of the Allies' invasion of Italy, Graziani fought within the ranks of the Nazi puppet state Italian Social Republic, he engaged in activism and militancy in the ranks of the Fasci di Azione Rivoluzionaria (FAR), the earliest Italian extra-parliamentary neofascist organization. While a FAR militant, he was arrested in Taranto in 1949 along with Biagio Bertucci for the attempted sabotage of the Italian navy ship Colombo, which was to be handed over to the Soviet Union as part of the war reparations dictated by the 1947 Paris Peace Treaty.

In the 1950s, Graziani took up various menial jobs, including mines work, where he learns to use explosives. He takes part, along with Pino Rauti and other neofascist activists, in demonstrative attacks against leftist demonstrators. On November 20, 1951, Graziani is sentenced to 1 year and 11 months of jail in the FAR trial.

== Leadership of MPON ==
In 1969, Graziani was a leading dissident within Ordine Nuovo against the decision of Pino Rauti to fold back into the MSI. On 21 December 1969, Graziani and his followers, including Elio Massagrande, Roberto Besutti, Sandro Saccucci, Mario Tedeschi, Antonio Ragusa, and Bruno Esposito, met in Graziani's apartment and found Movimento Politico Ordine Nuovo (MPON), of which Graziani became first secretary. The date chosen coincides with the winter solstice, a symbolic gesture to indicate an affinity with the thought of Julius Evola. The decision was announced on 7 January 1970, on the pages of the official Ordine Nuovo publication Orientamenti (Guidelines).

On 30 January 1971, Graziani's home along with the MPON headquarters are searched by the law authorities. A few months later, on 1 April, Graziani is arrested and accused of attempting to reorganise the dissolved Fascist party, an act exrpessly forbidden by the Italian constitution. The actual trial begins in 1973; Graziani refused interrogation and instead submits to the court a memorandum tiled "Ordine Nuovo on trial: ideas on trial" (Italian: Processo a Ordine Nuovo:processo alle idee).

== Life as a fugitive ==
Graziani, along with other MPON members, fled Italy in 1973, moving first in Greece, then Spain, London (where he is arrested for a while in 1977) and Bolivia, finally settling in Asunción, Paraguay, where he will spend the rest of his life. Graziani's son, Rainaldo Graziani, has followed in his father's political footsteps.

However, he does not stop his political activity. From 1973, and more intensely from 1975, Graziani, along with other MPON leaders discusses with Stefano delle Chiaie the possibility of merging Ordine Nuovo and Avanguardia Nazionale. After several clandestine meetings, the project is aborted, mostly because of the opposition of Graziani.

== Ideological contribution ==
In 1963, Graziani wrote The Revolutionary War (Italian: "La guerra rivoluzionaria"), a seminal pamphlet in the Italian far right that for the first time within Italian neofascism delineates the concept of a far right counterrevolutionary strategy from a military point of view and a precursor of the strategy of tension. In the writing, Graziani tried to analyze the methods of communist uprisings and guerrilla, for example that of Mao Zedong, and defines the current state of the world as a "non-declared permanent world war" fought by Communists to "Bolshevize the world". According to Graziani, the far right must meet the far left on their own ground: using terrorism and psychological warfare to control the population, exploiting their fears, not excluding the killing of innocent civilians. To do that, Graziani theorized the creation of an élite of revolutionary war experts, with CIA as an organizational and strategic model.

In 1969, Graziani addressed the militants of Ordine Nuovo, describing the movement should become a "revolutionary movement, beyond the trite and limiting schemes of parties, an agile formation, suitable to the needs of the current political situation and structured according to the criteria of revolutionary minorities".

However, after the assassination of judge Vittorio Occorsio by MPON member Pierluigi Concutelli, Graziani (along with other MPON leaders such as Elio Massagrande) kept an ambiguous position on political violence; on one hand taking political responsibility for the assassination, but at the same time indicating that the times would not be yet ripe for a proper armed struggle. Graziani reiterated the same position when meeting Sergio Calore in London, on April 25, 1977.

== Bibliography ==
- Fiorentino, Dario (September 2024). Clemente Graziani e Ordine Nuovo. RCS MediaGroup.
- Rao, Nicola (2009). Il piombo e la celtica. Sperling & Kupfer.
- Tassinari, Ugo Maria (2007). Naufraghi. Immaginapoli.
