= Paladin Group =

Paladin Group may refer to:

- Paladin Group (fascist organization), a far right mercenary group which existed during Francoist Spain
- Paladin Group (security company), a private security contractor which operates in Oceania and Southeast Asia

== See also ==
- Paladin (disambiguation)
