= Yves Guérin-Sérac =

French Roman Catholic activist (1926–2022)

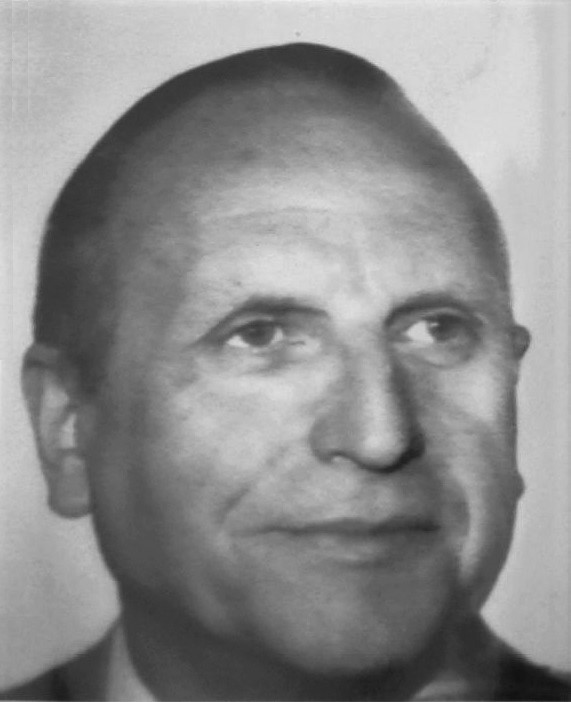
- Born: Yves Guillou; 2 December 1926; Ploubezre, France
- Died: 9 March 2022 (aged 95); Le Revest-les-Eaux, France
- Other names: Jean-Robert de Guernadec; Ralf
- Organization(s): Aginter Press; Organisation armée secrète SDECE

Yves Guérin-Sérac (French pronunciation: [iv ɡeʁɛ̃ seʁak]), born Yves Guillou ([iv ɡiju]; also known as Jean-Robert de Guernadec or Ralf; 2 December 1926 – 9 March 2022) was a French anti-Communist Roman Catholic activist, former officer of the French army and veteran of the First Indochina War (1945–1954), the Korean War (1950–1953) and the Algerian War of Independence (1955–1962). He was also a member of the elite troop of the 11ème Demi-Brigade Parachutiste de Choc, which worked with the SDECE (French intelligence agency), and a founding member of the Organisation armée secrète (OAS), a French terrorist group that fought against Algerian independence in 1961–62.

After fleeing to Francoist Spain, where he and many other fugitive OAS members were granted refuge, Guérin-Sérac continued his far-right activities. It is alleged that he was an instigator of the so-called strategy of tension in Italy, and the main organizer of the 1969 Piazza Fontana bombing.

== Iberian peninsula ==
Following the suppression of the OAS by the French government, Guérin-Sérac fled to Spain. He was sentenced to three years in prison in absentia. In June 1962, after the 18 March 1962 Évian Accords that put an end to the Algerian War, Guérin-Sérac was hired by Franco to engage in operations against the Spanish opposition. He then worked for Salazar's Estado Novo regime in Portugal, which, beside being the last colonial empire, was also, in his eyes, the last stronghold against communism and atheism: "The others have laid down their weapons, but not I. After the OAS I fled to Portugal to carry on the fight and expand it to its proper dimensions - which is to say, a planetary dimension." Guérin-Sérac met Petainist Jacques Ploncard d'Assac in Portugal, who introduced him to the right-wing establishment and to Portugal's secret police, the PIDE. Due to his extensive knowledge, Guérin-Sérac was recruited as an instructor for the paramilitary Legião Portuguesa, and for the counterguerrilla unit of the Portuguese army.

According to the magistrate Guido Salvini, in charge of the investigations concerning the 1969 Piazza Fontana bombing, "Guido Giannettini [one of the neo-fascists responsible for the bombing] had contacts with Yves Guérin-Sérac in Portugal ever since 1964."

== Neo-Templarism ==
Guillou was a member of the neo-Templar order the Sovereign Order of the Solar Temple. After arguments in 1981, the group schismed into two, one which embraced a more New Age and mystic appeal, and the other maintaining the original Templar origins; Guillou and some of his associates joined the former.

== Aginter Press ==
It was within this context that in 1965 he founded, along with Italian neofascist Stefano Delle Chiaie, Aginter Press, a secret anti-communist army, with the support of both the PIDE and the U.S. Central Intelligence Agency. A pseudo-press agency, "[It]... set up training camps, in which it instructed mercenaries and terrorists in a three-week course in covert action techniques, including hands-on bomb terrorism, silent assassination, subversion techniques, clandestine communication and infiltration, and colonial warfare." "During this period, disclosed Guérin-Sérac, we have systematically established close contacts with like-minded groups emerging in [current and former colonial powers] Italy, Belgium, Germany, Spain and Portugal, for the purpose of forming the kernel of a truly Western League of Struggle against Marxism." On 31 January 1968, Guérin-Sérac met Pino Rauti, then leader of Ordine Nuovo, who would rejoin the fascist Italian Social Movement (MSI) the following year. In the 1970s, Guérin-Sérac was in contact with Leo Negrelli, former chief press attaché of the Italian Social Republic.

== Death ==
Guérin-Sérac died on 9 March 2022 aged 95 in a nursing home at Le Revest-les-Eaux, where he had been hospitalized since 2017 due to Alzheimer's disease.

== See also ==
- Operation Gladio
