= Politics of Italy =

Politics of Italy Sistema politico italiano
- Polity type: Unitary parliamentary republic
- Constitution: Constitution of Italy

Legislative branch
- Name: Parliament
- Type: Bicameral
- Meeting place: Palazzo Madama; Palazzo Montecitorio
- Upper house
- Name: Senate
- Presiding officer: Ignazio La Russa, President of the Senate
- Lower house
- Name: Chamber of Deputies
- Presiding officer: Lorenzo Fontana, President of the Chamber of Deputies

Executive branch
- Head of state
- Title: President
- Currently: Sergio Mattarella
- Appointer: Parliament
- Head of government
- Title: Prime Minister
- Currently: Giorgia Meloni
- Appointer: President
- Cabinet
- Name: Council of Ministers
- Current cabinet: Meloni Cabinet
- Leader: Prime Minister
- Appointer: President
- Headquarters: Palazzo Chigi
- Ministries: 21

Judicial branch
- Name: Judiciary
- Supreme Court of Cassation
- Chief judge: Giovanni Mammone
- Constitutional Court
- Chief judge: Giovanni Amoroso

The politics of Italy are conducted through a parliamentary republic with a multi-party system. Italy has been a democratic republic since 2 June 1946, when the monarchy was abolished by popular referendum and a constituent assembly, formed by the representatives of all the anti-fascist forces that contributed to the defeat of Nazi and Fascist forces during the liberation of Italy, was elected to draft a constitution, which was promulgated on 1 January 1948.

Executive power is exercised by the Council of Ministers, which is led by the Prime Minister, officially referred to as "President of the Council" (Presidente del Consiglio). Legislative power is vested primarily in the two houses of Parliament and secondarily in the Council of Ministers, which can introduce bills and holds the majority in both houses. The judiciary is independent of the executive and the legislative branches. It is headed by the High Council of the Judiciary, a body presided over by the President, who is the head of state, though this position is separate from all branches. The current president is Sergio Mattarella, and the current prime minister is Giorgia Meloni.

The Economist Intelligence Unit rated Italy as a "flawed democracy" in 2024.^{:16} According to the 2025 V-Dem Democracy indices Italy was the 30th most liberal democratic country in the world. A high degree of fragmentation and instability, leading to often short-lived coalition governments, is characteristic of Italian politics. Since the end of World War II in 1945, Italy has had 69 governments, at an average of one every 1.11 years.

== Government ==
The political system of Italy

The Italian constitution is the result of the work of the Constituent Assembly, which was formed by the representatives of all the anti-fascist forces that contributed to the defeat of Nazi and Fascist forces during the liberation of Italy. Article 1 of the Italian constitution states:

Italy is a democratic Republic, founded on labour. Sovereignty belongs to the people and is exercised by the people in the forms and within the limits of the Constitution

— Article 1 of the Constitution of Italy

By stating that Italy is a democratic republic, the article solemnly declares the results of the constitutional referendum which took place on 1 June 1946. The State is not a hereditary property of the ruling monarch, but it is instead a Res Publica, belonging to everyone.

The people who are called to temporarily administer the republic are not owners, but servants; and the governed are not subjects, but citizens. And the sovereignty, that is the power to make choices that involve the entire community, belongs to the people, in accordance with the concept of a democracy, from the Greek demos (people) and kratìa (power). However, this power is not to be exercised arbitrarily, but in the forms and within the limits established by the rule of law.

=== Head of state ===
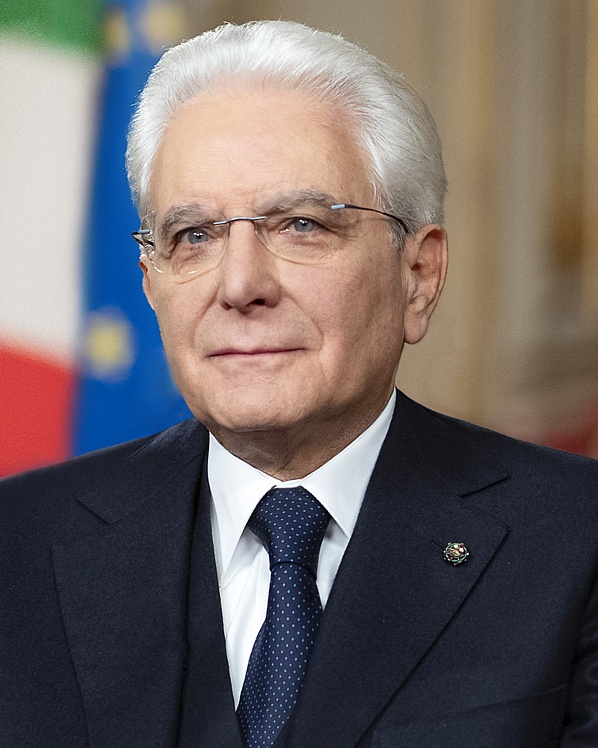
Sergio Mattarella, President of Italy since 3 February 2015

As the head of state, the President of Italy, officially denoted as President of the Italian Republic, represents national unity, and guarantees that Italian politics comply with the Constitution. The president serves as a point of connection between the three branches of the government, but has got considerably less powers than those previously given to the King of Italy. The President of Italy is the commander-in-chief of the Italian Armed Forces and chairs the High Council of the Judiciary. A president's term of office lasts for seven years.

The President of Italy is elected by an electoral college of minimum 658 members (according to the number of senators for life). It comprises both chambers of the Italian Parliament—the Chamber of Deputies and the Senate of the Republic—meeting in joint session, combined with 58 special electors appointed by the regional councils of the 20 regions of Italy. Three representatives come from each region (save for the Aosta Valley, which due to its small size only appoints one), so as to guarantee representation for localities and minorities.

=== Legislative branch ===
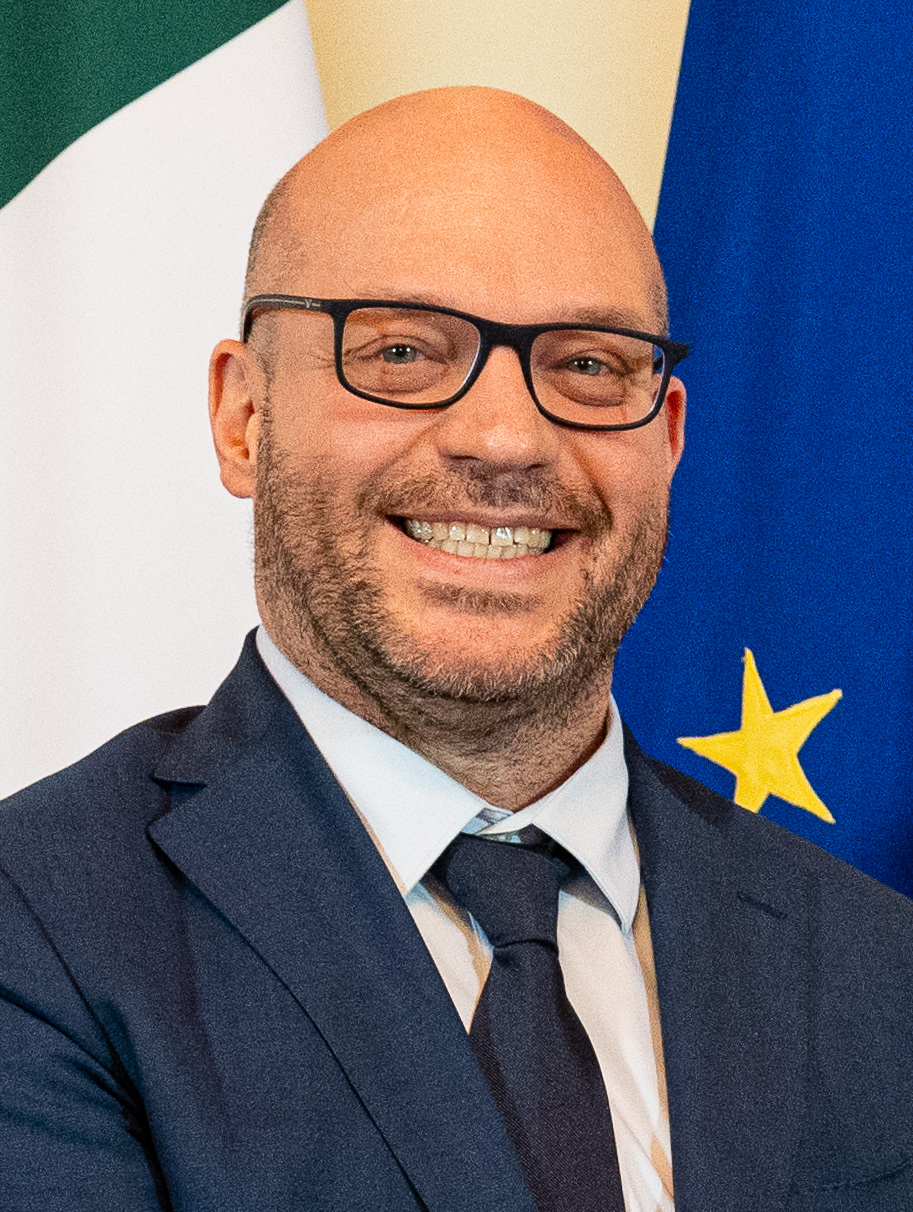
Lorenzo Fontana, President of the Chamber of Deputies since 14 October 2022

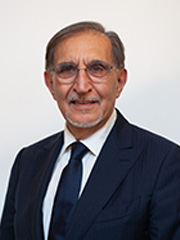
Ignazio La Russa, President of the Senate since 13 October 2022

With article 48 of the Constitution, which guarantees the right to vote, the people exercise their power through their elected representatives in the Parliament. The Parliament has a bicameral system, and consists of the Chamber of deputies and the Senate, elected every five years. The two houses together form a perfect bicameral system, meaning they perform identical functions, but do so separately.

The Chamber of Deputies, the lower house of the bicameral Italian Parliament, has 400 members, of which 392 are elected from Italian constituencies and 8 from Italian citizens living abroad. Members of the Chamber of Deputies are styled The Honourable (Italian: Onorevole) and meet at Palazzo Montecitorio in Rome.

The Senate of the Republic, the upper house of the bicameral Italian Parliament, has 200 members, of which 196 are elected from Italian constituencies and 4 from Italian citizens living abroad. In addition, there is a variable number (currently 6) of senators for life (senatori a vita), either appointed by the President of the Republic or rightfully so as former Presidents of the Republic. Members of the Senate are styled Senator or The Honourable Senator (Italian: Onorevole Senatore) and meet at Palazzo Madama in Rome.

=== Executive branch ===
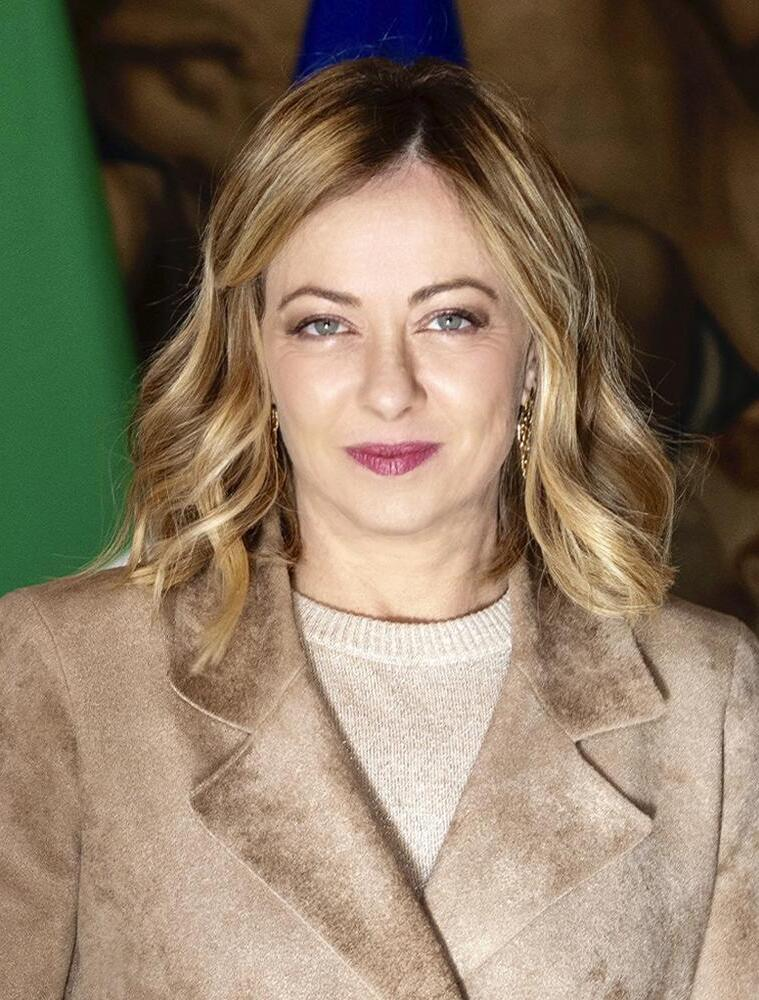
Giorgia Meloni, prime minister since 22 October 2022

The Constitution establishes the Government of Italy as composed of the president of the council (Prime Minister of Italy) and ministers. The President of Italy appoints the prime minister and, on their proposal, the ministers that form its cabinet.

The Prime Minister of Italy, officially the President of the Council of Ministers of the Italian Republic, is the head of government of the Italian Republic. The Prime Minister of Italy must have the confidence of the Italian Parliament to stay in office. The Prime Minister of Italy is the president of the Council of Ministers which holds executive power and the position is similar to those in most other parliamentary systems. The formal Italian order of precedence lists the office as being, ceremonially, the fourth-highest Italian state office after the president and the heads of the legislative chambers.

The Council of Ministers is the principal executive organ of the Government of Italy. It comprises the President of the council (the Prime Minister of Italy), all the ministers, and the undersecretary to the President of the council. Deputy ministers (Italian: viceministri) and junior ministers (Italian: sottosegretari) are part of the government, but are not members of the Council of Ministers.

=== Judicial branch ===
The law of Italy has a plurality of sources of production. These are arranged in a hierarchical scale, under which the rule of a lower source cannot conflict with the rule of an upper source (hierarchy of sources). The Constitution of 1948 is the main source.

The Constitution states that justice is administered in the name of the people and that judges are subject only to the law. So the judiciary is a branch that is completely autonomous and independent of all other branches of power, even though the Minister of Justice is responsible for the organization and functioning of those services involved with justice and has the power to originate disciplinary actions against judges, which are then administered by the High Council of the Judiciary, presided over by the President.

The judiciary of Italy is based on Roman law, the Napoleonic Code and later statutes. It is based on a mix of the adversarial and inquisitorial civil law systems, although the adversarial system was adopted in the Appeal Courts in 1988. Appeals are treated almost as new trials, and three degrees of trial are present. The third is a legitimating trial.

In November 2014, Italy accepted the compulsory jurisdiction of the International Court of Justice.

== Political parties and elections ==
Before 2021, the minimum voting age for all elections was 18 years old, aside for Senate elections, where the minimum voting age was 25 years old. Following the approval of Constitutional Law No. 1/2021, the minimum voting age for the Senate of the Republic became the same as for the Chamber of Deputies (18 years old and no longer 25). The 2022 Italian general election was the first one in which both chambers had identical electoral bodies.

=== Chamber of Deputies ===
Composition of the Chamber of Deputies following the 25 September 2022 election

Coalition	Party	Seats	%
Centre-right coalition	Brothers of Italy	119	29.75
Centre-right coalition	League	66	16.5
Centre-right coalition	Forza Italia	45	11.2
Centre-right coalition	Us Moderates	7	1.7
Centre-right coalition	Total seats	237	59.2
Centre-left coalition	Democratic Party-IDP	57	14.4
Centre-left coalition	Greens and Left Alliance	12	3.0
Centre-left coalition	More Europe	2	0.5
Centre-left coalition	Civic Commitment	1	0.5
Centre-left coalition	Aosta Valley	1	0.5
Centre-left coalition	Total seats	68	17.0
Five Star Movement		52	13.0
Action - Italia Viva		21	5.2
South Tyrolean People's Party		3	0.7
South Calls North		1	0.25
Associative Movement of Italians Abroad		1	0.25
Total		400	100

=== Senate of the Republic ===
Composition of the Senate following the 25 September 2022 election

Coalition	Party	Seats	%
Centre-right coalition	Brothers of Italy	65	32.5
Centre-right coalition	League	30	15.0
Centre-right coalition	Forza Italia	18	9.0
Centre-right coalition	Us Moderates	2	1.0
Centre-right coalition	Total seats	115	57.5
Centre-left coalition	Democratic Party-IDP	40	20.0
Centre-left coalition	Greens and Left Alliance	4	2.0
Centre-left coalition	Total seats	44	22.0
Five Star Movement		28	14.0
Action - Italia Viva		9	4.5
South Tyrolean People's Party		2	1.0
South Calls North		1	0.5
Associative Movement of Italians Abroad		1	0.5
Total		200	100

=== Political parties ===
Italy's dramatic self-renewal transformed the political landscape between 1992 and 1997. Scandal investigations touched thousands of politicians, administrators and businessmen; the shift from a proportional to the scorporo system (with the requirement to obtain a minimum of 4% of the national vote to obtain representation) also altered the political landscape. Party changes were sweeping. The Christian Democratic party dissolved; the Italian People's Party and the Christian Democratic Center emerged. Other major parties, such as the Socialists, saw support plummet. A new liberal movement, Forza Italia, gained wide support among moderate voters. The National Alliance broke from the neo-fascist Italian Social Movement (MSI). A trend toward two large coalitions (one on the center-left and the other on the center-right) emerged from the April 1995 regional elections. For the 1996 national elections, the center-left parties created the Olive Tree coalition while the center-right united again under the House of Freedoms. These coalitions continued into the 2001 and 2007 national elections.

This emerging bipolarity represents a major break from the fragmented, multi-party political landscape of the postwar era, although it appears to have reached a plateau since efforts via referendums to further curtail the influence of small parties were defeated in 1999, 2000 and 2009.

== Regional governments ==
Five regions (Aosta Valley, Friuli-Venezia Giulia, Sardinia, Sicily and Trentino-Alto Adige/Südtirol) have special charters granting them varying degrees of autonomy. The raisons d'être of these charters is in most cases the presence of significant linguistic and cultural minorities, but in the case of Sicily it was to calm down separatist movements. The other 15 regions were in practice established in 1970, even if their ideation had been a much earlier idea.

Region	Name	Portrait	Since	Term	Party	Coalition	Last election
Aosta Valley	Renzo Testolin (1968–)		2 March 2023 (Note: Renzo Testolin was president also in 2019–2020.)	2025–2030	UV	Centre-right	2025
Piedmont	Alberto Cirio (1972–)		6 June 2019	2024–2029	FI	Centre-right	2024
Liguria	Marco Bucci (1959–)		6 November 2024	2024–2029	Indep	Centre-right	2024
Lombardy	Attilio Fontana (1952–)		26 March 2018	2023–2028	Lega–LL	Centre-right	2023
Trentino-Alto Adige/Südtirol	Arno Kompatscher (1972–)		13 March 2024	2024–2026 (rotational presidency)	SVP	Centre-right	2023
Veneto	Alberto Stefani (1992–)		5 December 2020	2025–2030	Lega–LV	Centre-right	2025
Friuli-Venezia Giulia	Massimiliano Fedriga (1980–)		30 April 2018	2023–2028	Lega–LFVG	Centre-right	2023
Emilia-Romagna	Michele De Pascale (1985–)		13 December 2024	2024–2029	PD	Centre-left	2024
Tuscany	Eugenio Giani (1959–)		8 October 2020	2025–2030	PD	Centre-left	2025
Umbria	Stefania Proietti (1975–)		2 December 2024	2024–2029	Indep	Centre-left	2024
Marche	Francesco Acquaroli (1974–)		30 September 2020	2025–2030	FdI	Centre-right	2025
Lazio	Francesco Rocca (1965–)		2 March 2023	2023–2028	Indep–FdI	Centre-right	2023
Abruzzo	Marco Marsilio (1968–)		11 February 2019	2024–2029	FdI	Centre-right	2024
Molise	Francesco Roberti (1967–)		6 July 2023	2023–2028	FI	Centre-right	2023
Campania	Roberto Fico (1974–)		9 December 2025	2025–2030	M5S	Centre-left	2025
Apulia	Antonio Decaro (1970–)		7 January 2026	2025–2030	PD	Centre-left	2025
Basilicata	Vito Bardi (1951–)		25 March 2019	2024–2029	FI	Centre-right	2024
Calabria	Roberto Occhiuto (1969–)		29 October 2021	2025–2030	FI	Centre-right	2025
Sicily	Renato Schifani (1950–)		13 October 2022	2022–2027	FI	Centre-right	2022
Sardinia	Alessandra Todde (1969–)		20 March 2024	2024–2029	M5S	Centre-left	2024

== History of the post-war political landscape ==
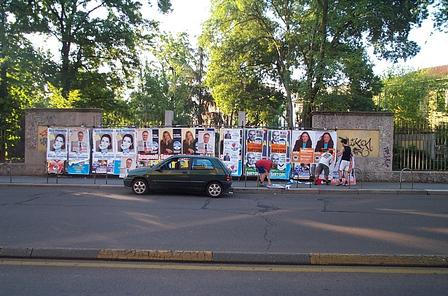
Campaigners working on posters in Milan, 2004

=== First Republic: 1946–1994 ===
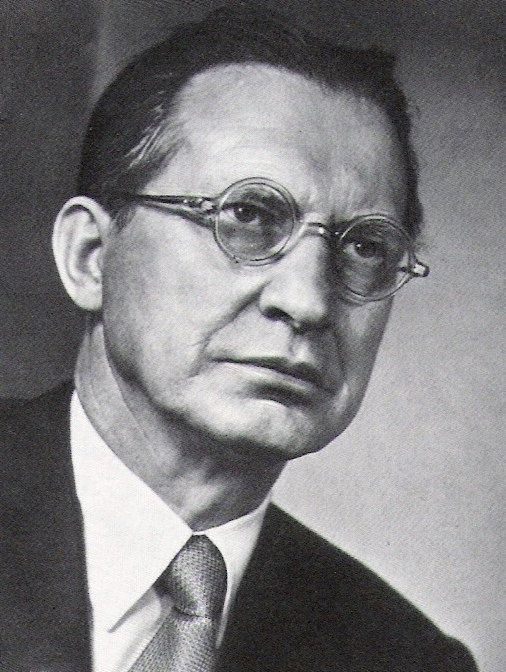
Alcide De Gasperi, the first republican Prime Minister of Italy and one of the Founding fathers of the European Union. He was Prime Minister from 1945 to 1953.

There have been frequent government turnovers since 1945, indeed there have been 66 governments in this time. The dominance of the Christian Democratic party (DC) during much of the post-war period lent continuity and comparative stability to Italy's political situation, mainly dominated by the attempt of keeping the Italian Communist Party (PCI) out of power in order to maintain Cold War equilibrium in the region (see May 1947 crisis).

The Italian Communists were in the government only in the national unity governments before 1948, in which their party's secretary Palmiro Togliatti was minister of Justice. After the first democratic elections with universal suffrage in 1948 in which the Christian Democracy and their allies won against the popular front of the Italian Communist and Socialist (PSI) parties, the Italian Communist Party never returned in the government.

The system had been nicknamed the "imperfect bipolarism", referring to more proper bipolarism in other Western countries (such as France, Germany, the United Kingdom, and the United States) where right-wing and left-wing parties alternated in government. Meanwhile, rising post-war tensions between right-wing and left-wing parties in Italy brought to the radicalization and proliferation of numerous far-left and far-right terrorist organizations throughout the country.

==== Entrance of the Socialists to the government ====
The main event in the First Republic in the 1960s was the inclusion of the Italian Socialist Party in the government after the reducing edge of the Christian Democracy (DC) had forced them to accept this alliance. In 1960, attempts to incorporate the Italian Social Movement (MSI) within the Tambroni Cabinet, a neo-fascist far-right party and the only surviving political remnant of the Republican Fascist Party that was disbanded in the aftermath of the Italian Civil War (1943–1945), led to short-lived riots in the summer of the same year; as a consequence, Fernando Tambroni was eventually replaced by the Christian Democrat politician Amintore Fanfani as Prime Minister of Italy.

Aldo Moro, a relatively left-leaning Christian Democrat, inspired the alliance between the Christian Democracy and the Italian Socialist Party. He would later try to include the Italian Communist Party as well with a deal called the "historic compromise". However, this attempt at compromise was stopped by the kidnapping and murder of Aldo Moro in 1978 by the Red Brigades (BR), an extremist left-wing terrorist organization.

The Italian Communist Party was at this point the largest communist party in Western Europe, and remained such for the rest of its existence. Their ability to attract members was largely due to their pragmatic stance, especially their rejection of political extremism and to their growing independence from the Soviet Union (see Eurocommunism). The Italian Communist Party was especially strong in regions like Emilia-Romagna and Tuscany, where communists had been elected to stable government positions. This practical political experience may have contributed to their taking a more pragmatic approach to politics.

==== Years of Lead ====
On 12 December 1969, a roughly decade-long period of extremist left- and right-wing political terrorism, known as The Years of Lead (as in the metal of bullets, Italian: anni di piombo), began with the Piazza Fontana bombing in the center of Milan. Neofascist Vincenzo Vinciguerra later declared the bombing to be an attempt to push the Italian state to declare a state of emergency in order to lead to a more authoritative state. A bomb left in a bank killed about twenty and was initially blamed on anarchist Giuseppe Pinelli. This accusation was hotly contested by left-wing circles, especially the Maoist Student Movement, which had support in those years from some students of Milan's universities and who considered the bombing to have all the marks of a fascist operation. Their guess proved correct, but only after many years of difficult investigations.

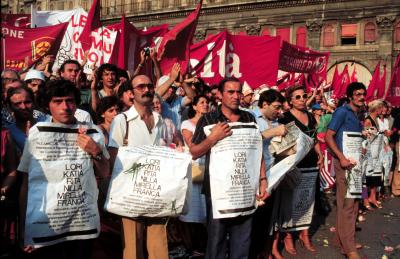
Funerals of the victims of the 2 August 1980 Bologna massacre, the deadliest attack ever perpetrated in Italy during the Years of Lead

The strategy of tension attempted to blame the left for bombings carried out by right-wing terrorists. Fascist "black terrorists", such as Ordine Nuovo and the Avanguardia Nazionale, were in the 1980s and 1990s found to be responsible for several terrorist attacks. On the other extreme of the political spectrum, the leftist Red Brigades carried out assassinations against specific persons, but were not responsible for any blind bombings. The Red Brigades killed socialist journalist Walter Tobagi and in their most famous operation kidnapped and assassinated Aldo Moro, president of the Christian Democracy, who was trying to involve the Communist Party in the government through the compromesso storico ("historic compromise"), to which the radical left as well as Washington were opposed.

The last and largest of the bombings, known as the Bologna massacre, destroyed the city's railway station in 1980. This was found to be a neofascist bombing, in which Propaganda Due was involved. On 24 October 1990, Prime Minister Giulio Andreotti (DC) revealed to the Parliament the existence of Gladio, NATO's secret "stay-behind" networks which stocked weapons in order to facilitate an armed resistance in case of a communist coup. In 2000, a Parliament Commission report from the Olive Tree (centre-left) coalition concluded that the strategy of tension followed by Gladio had been supported by the United States to "stop the PCI and, to a certain degree, the PSI [Italian Socialist Party] from reaching executive power in the country".

==== 1980s ====
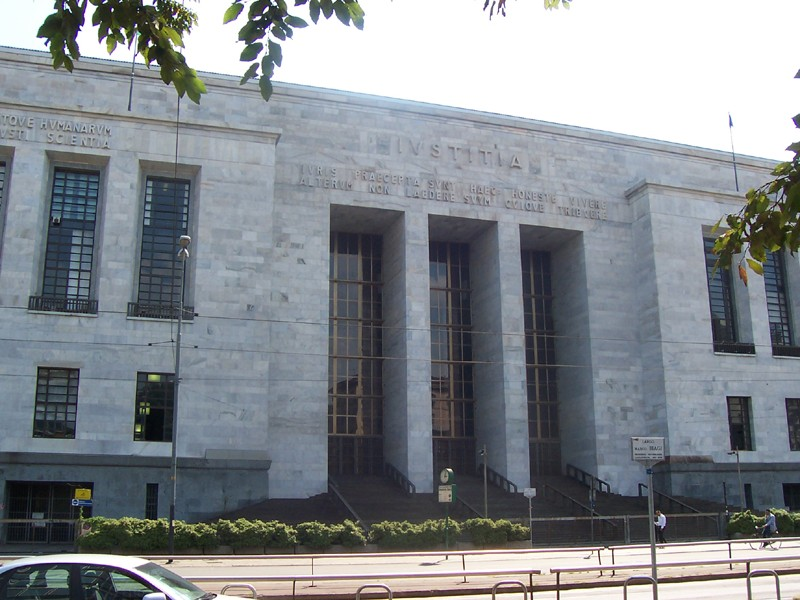
Milan's Palace of Justice, where the investigation of mani pulite began.

With the end of the lead years, the Communist Party gradually increased their votes under the leadership of Enrico Berlinguer. The Italian Socialist Party, led by Bettino Craxi, became more and more critical of the communists and of the Soviet Union; Craxi himself pushed in favor of Ronald Reagan's positioning of Pershing II missiles in Italy, a move many communists strongly disapproved of.

As the Socialist Party moved to more moderate positions, it attracted many reformists, some of whom were irritated by the failure of the communists to modernize. Increasingly, many on the left began to see the communists as old and out of fashion while Craxi and the socialists seemed to represent a new liberal socialism. The Communist Party surpassed the Christian Democrats only in the European elections of 1984, held barely two days after Berlinguer's death, a passing that likely drew sympathy from many voters. The election of 1984 was to be the only time the Christian Democrats did not emerge as the largest party in a nationwide election in which they participated.

In 1987, one year after the Chernobyl disaster following a referendum in that year, a nuclear phase-out was commenced. Italy's four nuclear power plants were closed down, the last in 1990. A moratorium on the construction of new plants, originally in effect from 1987 until 1993, has since been extended indefinitely.

In these years, corruption began to be more extensive, a development that would be exposed in the early 1990s and nicknamed Tangentopoli. With the mani pulite investigation, starting just one year after the collapse of the Soviet Union, the whole power structure faltered and seemingly indestructible parties, such as the Christian Democrats and the Socialist Party, disbanded whereas the Communist Party changed its name to the Democratic Party of the Left and took the role of the Socialist Party as the main social democratic party in Italy. What was to follow was then called the transition to the Second Republic.

=== Second Republic: 1994–present ===
From 1992 to 1997, Italy faced significant challenges as voters, disenchanted with past political paralysis, massive government debt, extensive corruption and organized crime's considerable influence, collectively called Tangentopoli after being uncovered by mani pulite, demanded political, economic and ethical reforms.

In the Italian referendums of 1993, voters approved substantial changes, including moving from a proportional to the scorporo system which is largely dominated by a majoritarian electoral system and the abolition of some ministries, some of which have been reintroduced with only partly modified names, such as the Ministry of Agriculture reincarnated as the Ministry of Agricultural Resources.

Major political parties, beset by scandal and loss of voter confidence, underwent far-reaching changes. New political forces and new alignments of power emerged in the March 1994 national elections. This election saw a major turnover in the new parliament, with 452 out of 630 deputies and 213 out of 315 senators elected for the first time.

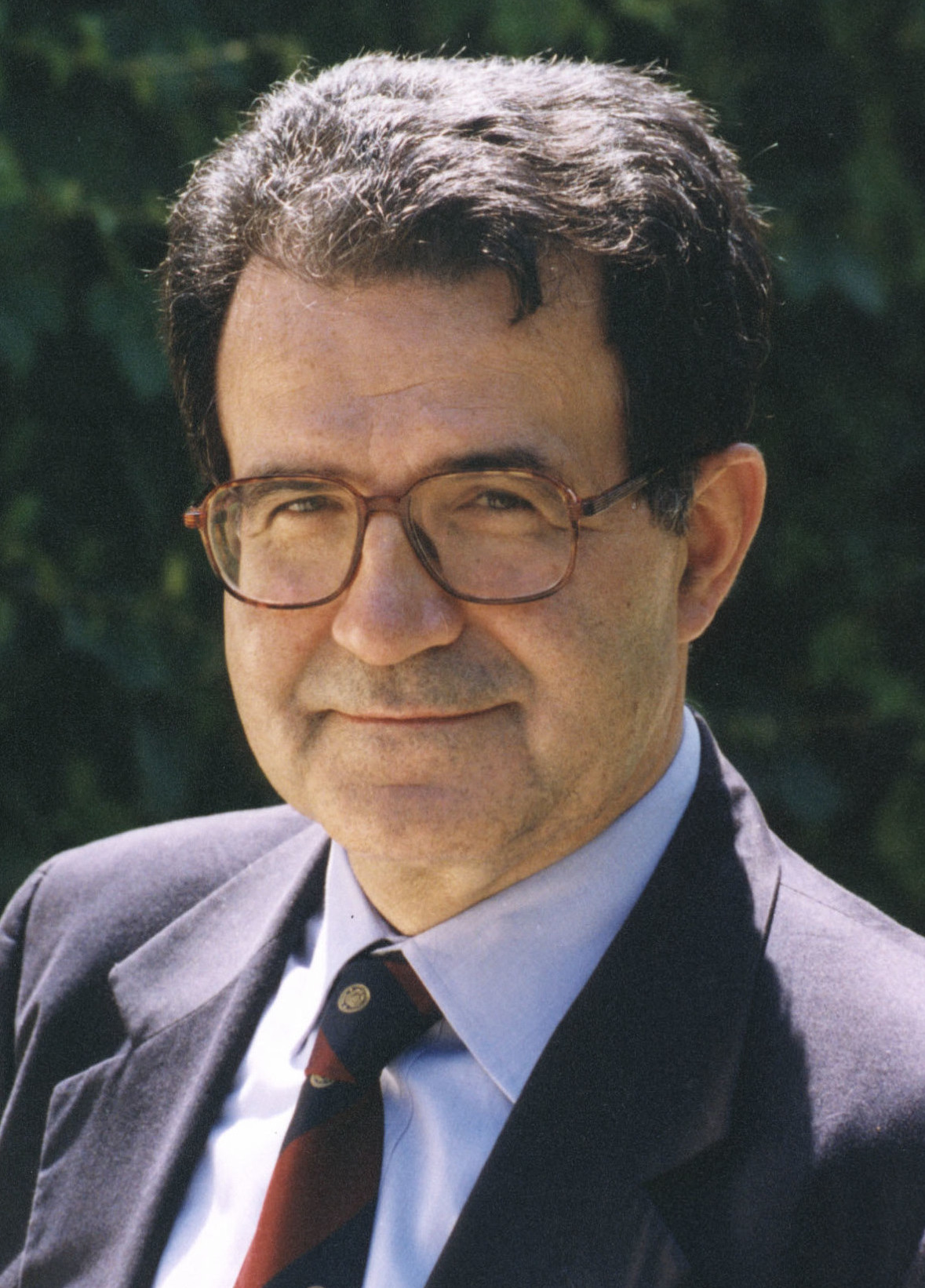
Romano Prodi, Prime Minister from 1996 to 1998 and from 2006 to 2008, and long-time leader of the centre-left coalition

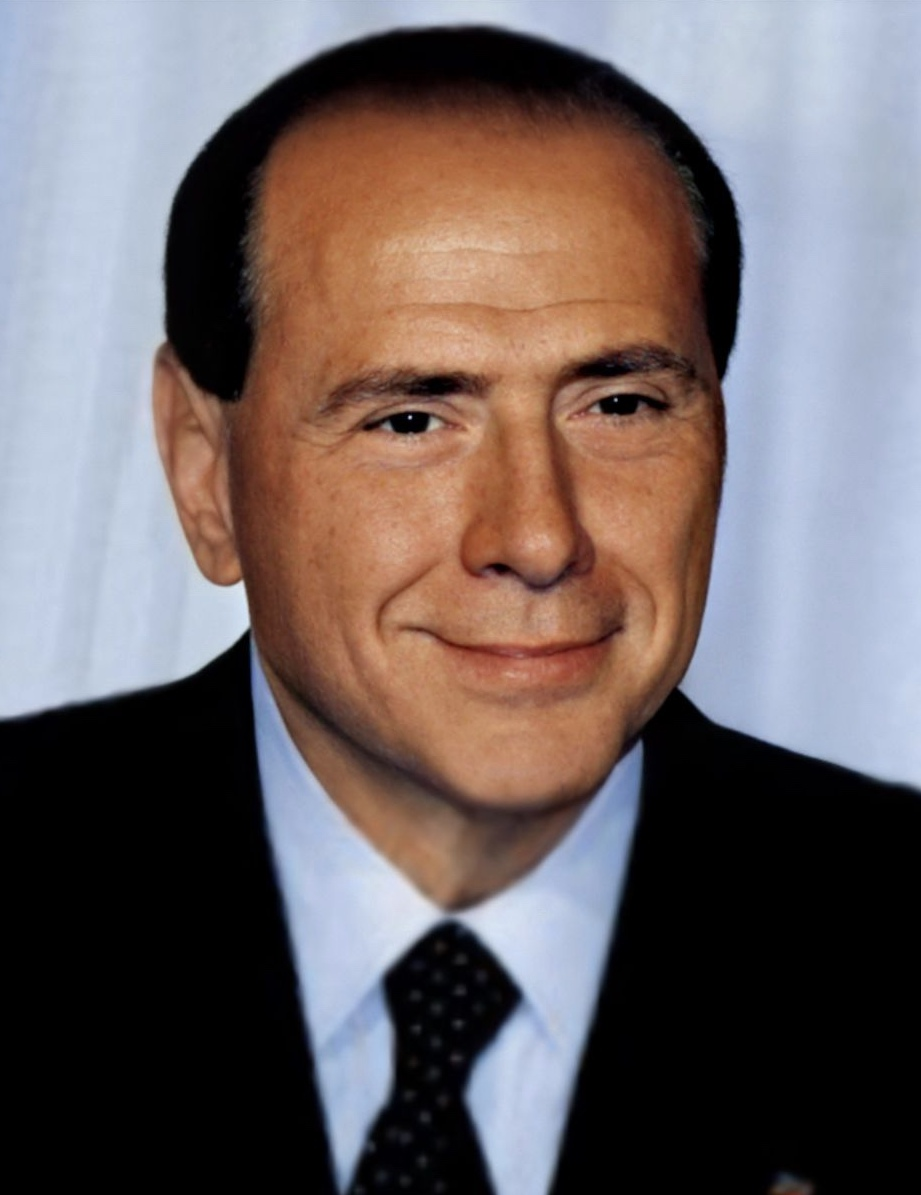
Silvio Berlusconi, Prime Minister from 1994 to 1995, from 2001 to 2006 and from 2008 to 2011, and long-time leader of the centre-right coalition

The 1994 elections also swept media magnate Silvio Berlusconi (leader of Pole of Freedoms coalition) into office as prime minister. However, Berlusconi was forced to step down in December 1994 when the Northern League withdrew support. The Berlusconi government was succeeded by a technical government headed by Prime Minister Lamberto Dini, which left office in early 1996.

A series of center-left coalitions dominated Italy's political landscape between 1996 and 2001. In April 1996, national elections led to the victory of a center-left coalition, The Olive Tree, under the leadership of Romano Prodi. Prodi's government became the third-longest to stay in power before he narrowly lost a vote of confidence, by three votes, in October 1998.

In May 1999, the Parliament selected Carlo Azeglio Ciampi as the President of the Republic. Ciampi, a former prime minister and Minister of the Treasury and before entering the government also the governor of the Bank of Italy, was elected on the first ballot by a comfortable margin over the required two-thirds of the votes.

A new government was formed by the Democrats of the Left leader and former communist Massimo D'Alema, but in April 2000 he resigned following poor performance by his coalition in regional elections.

The succeeding center-left government, including most of the same parties, was headed by Giuliano Amato, a social democrat, who had previously served as prime minister in 1992–1993 and had at the time sworn never to return to active politics.

National elections held on 13 May 2001 returned Berlusconi to power at the head of the five-party center-right House of Freedoms coalition, comprising the Prime Minister's own party, Forza Italia, the National Alliance, the Northern League, the Christian Democratic Centre and the United Christian Democrats.

Between 17 May 2006 and 21 February 2007, Romano Prodi served as prime minister of Italy following the narrow victory of his The Union coalition over the House of Freedoms led by Silvio Berlusconi in the April 2006 Italian elections. Following a government crisis, Prodi submitted his resignation on 21 February 2007. Three days later, he was asked by President Giorgio Napolitano to stay on as prime minister and he agreed to do so. On 28 February 2007, Prodi narrowly survived a senate no confidence vote.

On 24 January 2008, the Prodi II Cabinet went through a new crisis because Minister of Justice Clemente Mastella retracted his support to the Cabinet. Consequently, the Prodi Cabinet lost the vote of confidence and the President Giorgio Napolitano called a new general election.

The election set against two new parties, the Democratic Party (founded in October 2007 by the union of the Democrats of the Left and The Daisy) led by Walter Veltroni: and The People of Freedom (federation of Forza Italia, National Alliance and other parties) led by Silvio Berlusconi. The Democratic Party was in alliance with Italy of Values while The People of Freedom forged an alliance with the Northern League and the Movement for Autonomy. The coalition led by Berlusconi won the election and the leader of the centre-right created the Berlusconi IV Cabinet.

The Monti government had the highest average age in the western world (64 years), with its youngest members being 57. The previous Italian Prime Minister Mario Monti is 70, his predecessor Silvio Berlusconi was 75 at the time of resignation (2011), the previous head of the government Romano Prodi was 70 when he stepped down (2008), the Italian President Giorgio Napolitano is 88 and his predecessor Carlo Azeglio Ciampi was 86. In 2013, the youngest among the candidates for prime minister (Pier Luigi Bersani) is 62, the others being 70 and 78. The current average age of Italian university professors is 63, of bank directors and CEOs 67, of members of parliament 56 and of labor union representatives 59.

The new Italian government headed by Enrico Letta took two months to form and made international news when Luigi Preiti shot at policemen near the building where they were swearing in the new government on Sunday 28 April 2013.

Former Prime Minister Matteo Renzi became the youngest prime minister at 39 years and his government had the youngest average age in Europe.

==== Grand coalition governments ====
At different times since his entering the Italian Parliament, Silvio Berlusconi, leader of the centre-right, had repeatedly vowed to stop the "communists", while leftist parties had insisted that they would oust Berlusconi. Thus, despite the fact that the executive branch bears responsibility toward the Parliament, the governments led by Mario Monti (since 2011) and by Enrico Letta (since 2013) were called "unelected governments" because they won a vote of confidence by a Parliament coalition formed by centre-right and left-right parties that had in turn obtained parliamentary seats by taking part in the elections as competitors, rather than allies. While formally complying with law and procedures, the creation of these governments did not comply with the decision made by people through the election.

Meanwhile, in 2013, a ruling by the Constitutional Court of Italy established that the Italian electoral system employed to elect the Parliament breached a number of Constitutional requirements. Notably, the Court observed the following four facts: 1) "such a legislation deprives the elector of any margin of choice of its representatives"; 2) "all of the elected parliamentarians, with no exception, lack the support of a personal designation by the citizens"; 3) the electoral law has regulations which "exclude any ability on the part of the elector to have an influence on the election of his/her representatives"; 4) and contains conditions such that "they alter the representative relationship between electors and elected people...they coerce the electors' freedom of choice in the election of their representatives to the Parliament...and consequently they are at odds with the democratic principle, by affecting the very freedom of vote provided for by art. 48 of the Constitution". This implies that, despite being called – and acting as – a legitimate "parliament", the legislative assembly of Italy was chosen with a vote system by which the right to vote was not exercised according to the Italian fundamental chart of citizen's rights and duties. The issue was a major one, to the extent that the Constitutional Court itself ruled that the Italian Parliament should remain in charge only to reform the electoral system and then should be dissolved.

The new government led by Matteo Renzi proposed a new electoral law. The so-called Italicum was approved in 2015 and came into force on 1 July 2016.

==== Since 2016 ====
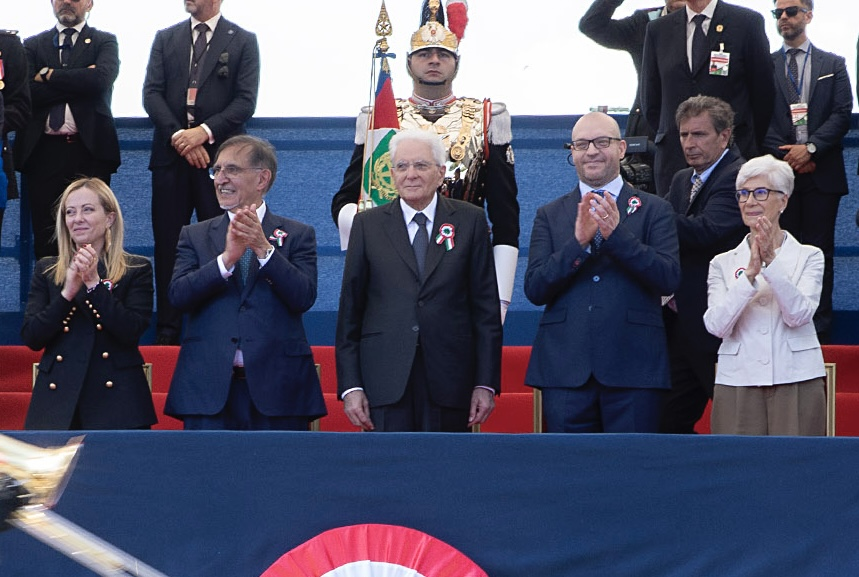
The most important offices of the Italian State have pinned on the jacket, during the military parade of the Festa della Repubblica celebrated every 2 June, a cockade of Italy.

Renzi resigned after losing a constitutional referendum in December 2016, and was succeeded by Paolo Gentiloni. The centre-left cabinets were plagued by the aftermath of the European debt crisis and the European migrant crisis, that fueled support for populist and right-wing parties. In 2017, the so-called Italicum was replaced by a new electoral law, which uses a parallel voting system to assign seats.

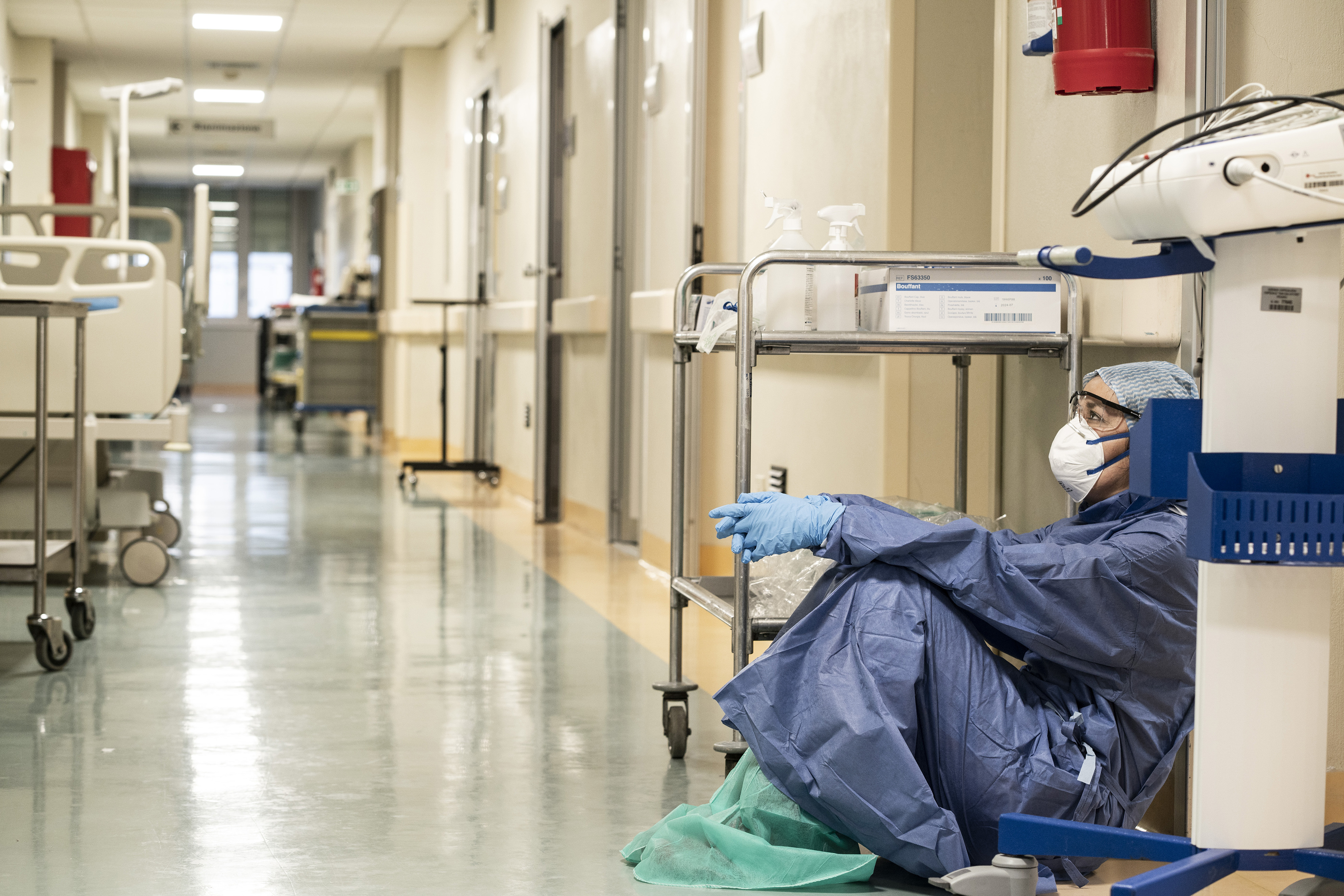
Exhausted nurse takes a break in an Italian hospital during the COVID-19 emergency.

The 2018 general election produced once again a hung parliament that resulted in the birth of an unlikely populist government between the anti-system Five Star Movement (M5S) and Salvini's League, led by Giuseppe Conte. After fourteen months, the League withdrew its support to Conte. The M5S subsequently allied with the Democratic Party and other smaller left-wing parties to form a new cabinet, once again headed by Conte.

In 2020, Italy was severely hit by the COVID-19 pandemic. From March to May, Conte's government imposed a national quarantine as a measure to limit the spread of the pandemic. The measures, despite being widely approved by public opinion, were also described as the largest suppression of constitutional rights in the history of the republic. With more than 100,000 confirmed victims, Italy was one of the countries with the highest total number of deaths in the COVID-19 pandemic. The pandemic caused also a severe economic disruption, which resulted in Italy being one of the most affected countries. In February 2021, these extraordinary circumstances brought to the formation of a national coalition government led by former president of the European Central Bank Mario Draghi, following IV's decision to withdraw its support to the second Conte cabinet. On 13 February 2021, Draghi was sworn in as Italy's new prime minister. The Draghi Cabinet had support across the broad political spectrum. In January 2022, Italian President Sergio Mattarella was re-elected to serve a second consecutive seven-year term.

On 21 July 2022, following a government crisis which ended with FI, League and the M5S deciding to withdraw their support to the government, Prime Minister Draghi resigned. President Sergio Mattarella consequently dissolved the Parliament and called a snap election, which resulted in the centre-right coalition, led by Giorgia Meloni, gaining an absolute majority of seats. Meloni was formally sworn in as Italy's first female prime minister on 22 October 2022.

== Democratic performance ==
Italy is generally described as a high-performing or middling democracy by democracy indices. The Economist described Italy as a flawed democracy in its 2024 Democracy Index, notably due to Italy's bad 'political culture' (6.88 out of 10 points). This measures popular support for democracy as opposed to military or expert rule.^{:11,16} By contrast, Italy received almost full marks for its 'electoral process and pluralism' (9.58 points). In the global ranking, Italy came in 37th place. Similarly, according to the 2025 V-Dem Democracy indices Italy was the 30th most liberal democratic country in the world. It scored top 4 in the world for participative democracy, i.e. active citizen participation via civil society and local elections.

Freedom House qualified Italy as free with 89 out of 100 points in 2024, citing its competitive multiparty elections and general granting of civil liberties. For press freedom however, Freedom House awarded Italy only five out of six points, citing common defamation suits against journalists with serious financial costs for defendants, even if acquitted after a lengthy procedure. The think tank also raised substantial concerns about Italian LGBT and migrant rights, substantial regional inequalities and endemic corruption in Italy and organised crime. Global State of Democracy classified Italy as a high-range performer in all categories, except for the rule of law. As an example of flawed rule of law, the ranking cites that the central government reassigned the judges responsible for migrant detention, in what the opposition called retaliation. The Polity project describes Italy as a full democracy (10 out of 10) since 1948.

== See also ==
- Censorship in Italy
- Elections in Italy
- History of Italy
- List of political parties in Italy
- List of presidents of Italy
- List of prime ministers of Italy
- Political history
- Anti-fascism
- Post–World War II anti-fascism
