= Carlo Cicuttini =

Italian neofascist militant (1947–2010)

- Cicuttini (left) during the process of his extradition from France to Italy, c. 1998
- Born: 23 March 1947; San Giovanni al Natisone, Italy
- Died: 24 February 2010 (aged 62); Palmanova, Italy
- Organization: Ordine Nuovo
- Known for: Acts of terrorism
- Political party: MSI
- Movement: Neofascism

Carlo Cicuttini (23 March 1947 – 24 February 2010) was an Italian neo-fascist militant who was involved in multiple right-wing terrorist attacks in Italy and Spain during the 1970s.

== Political activism ==
Cicuttini, born on 23 March 1947, joined the far-right Italian Social Movement (Movimento Sociale Italiano; MSI) at a young age, and by 1972 he was in charge of the San Giovanni al Natisone MSI section. At the same time, he was a member of the neofascist paramilitary organization Ordine Nuovo.

== Peteano massacre ==
In the evening of 31 May 1972, while the European Cup final between Inter and Ajax was being transmitted live on television, an anonymous telephone call was made to the Gradisca d'Isonzo station of the carabinieri. The caller reported that there was a Fiat 500 car parked in nearby Peteano with what appeared to be two bullet holes. The vehicle was indeed located in Peteano. When the carabinieri tried to open the hood, the car exploded, instantly killing three of them, 33-year old Donato Poveromo, 23-year old Franco Bongiovanni, and Antonio Ferraro, 31, while seriously wounding two others.

After some twenty years, neofascist and ordinovista Vincenzo Vinciguerra, who had been convicted of planting the bomb in Peteano, revealed in 1992 that Cicuttini was his accomplice. Cicuttini had made the call from a bar in Monfalcone.

== Ronchi hijacking ==
On 6 October 1972, Ivano Boccaccio, a former paratrooper, embarked on the Fokker aircraft of the Aero Trasporti Italiani airline scheduled to depart at 17:00 hrs from the Ronchi dei Legionari airport to its Bari destination. 21-year old Boccaccio was wearing a blonde wig and carrying Cicuttini's Luger pistol, a hand grenade, and a parachute that had been, as was subsequently revealed during the Italian authorities' investigation, purchased in Switzerland by Vincenzo Vinciguerra together with Cicuttini, all three of them being Ordine Nuovo members at the time.

At some point after take-off, Boccaccio, threatening with his gun the pilots and warning them that he was carrying a bomb, forced the plane back to Ronchi, where he demanded a ransom of 200 million lire (Note: Equivalent to approximately $300,000 at the time.) and the freedom of some unnamed "political prisoners." (Note: It was subsequently speculated that Boccaccio had demanded the freedom of neofascist Franco Freda, at the time imprisoned as suspect for the Piazza Fontana bombing. See Tassinari (2019).) Later, in the evening, he freed the passengers in exchange for the plane's refueling, during which the crew managed to escape. The police stormed the plane and Boccaccio was killed under circumstances that never became known in detail.

== Flights, arrests, and trials ==
In late 1972, Cicuttini fled to Spain where he sought permanent residence. Vinciguerra stayed behind and was arrested in 1979. During his time in Spain, Cicuttini met and married Maria Fernanda Fontanals, daughter of an army general. On the basis of this marriage, he obtained Spanish citizenship. It has been alleged that, on 24 January 1977, he took part in the attack carried out at the offices of the Communist Party of Spain-supported Comisiones Obreras union, in which five activists were killed by armed, masked men. (Note: See 1977 Atocha massacre.) While living in Spain, and during the period of the country's transition to democracy, Cicuttini, according to reports by Italian intelligence agencies, was involved in numerous armed actions undertaken by the Guerrilleros de Cristo Rey and the Grupos Antiterroristas de Liberación, such as attacks against the ETA.

After lengthy investigations (Note: The investigation had been initially assigned to carabinieri general Dino Mingarelli who focused his attention on members of extra-parliamentary, far-left organizations such as Lotta Continua. After lengthy delays and impasses, the investigation was taken off his hands and assigned to civil magistrates. Mingarelli and other participants in the initial investigation were tried for "perverting the course of justice" and sentenced in 1991 to prison terms. See Cecchetti (1991).) carried out by Venetian magistrate Felice Casson, arrest warrants were issued in 1982 for Cicuttini and Vinciguerra on account of their participation in the Peteano massacre and the hijacking. (Note: During the course of the investigation, Casson uncovered the conspiracy web that eventually came to light as "Operation Gladio". See Pedrick (1990). See González (1990).) Casson used voice experts to identify the voice in the 1972 anonymous phone call to the carabinieri as belonging to Cicuttini. The Italian warrant for the arrest and extradition of Cicuttini for the two crimes was rejected in 1983, and again in 1986, by the Spanish courts on the basis of Spanish Law 46/1977 that had granted amnesty to all Spanish citizens who had committed crimes "for political purposes." He was tried in absentia in 1987 and sentenced to 14 years imprisonment while Vinciguerra was acquitted. The sentences were appealed by both the prosecution and the defence and, in the subsequent trial, each of the two defendants was sentenced to 11 years in prison, Cicuttini once again in absentia. (Note: As of 2022, Vinciguerra continues to serve his life sentence.)

On 17 April 1998, Cicuttini was arrested by the French police while he was in Toulouse and, after a period of legal challenges he mounted, he was extradited to Italy, where he commenced serving his Peteano bombing sentence of life imprisonment that would run concurrently with his 11-year prison term for the Ronchi hijacking.

== Death ==
While serving his sentence in the Parma prison, Cicuttini was diagnosed in 2009 as having a lung tumor. He was allowed to get treatment under guard in the Palmanova hospital, where he died on 24 February 2010.

== See also ==
- Years of lead
- Armed, far-right organizations in Italy
