= Leo Negrelli =

Leo Negrelli (Trieste, 1894 – Spain, 1974), was an Italian journalist.

As a member of the Sursum Corda he was one of the organisers of Gabriele D'Annunzio's arrival in Fiume in 1919. Negrelli continued to play an important part in the 1920s as the main liaison for Hermann Göring in Italy, after the failure of Hitler's Beer Hall revolution in 1923. Before the coup d'état Kurt Ludecke persuaded Mussolini to send Dr. Leo Negrelli to Munich to interview Hitler on October 16, 1923, for the Corriere Italiano. In 1926 he became director of the Alpenzeitung the German newspaper published under the auspices of the Italian Fascist government for the province of Bolzano. In summer 1929 Leo Negrelli was in charge with an experimental radio broadcasting program aimed for Italians residing in America and in the Italian African colonies. The transmissions, intended as a propaganda service, from the stationery Roma S.Paolo were under the control of the Ministry of the communications on behalf of the government press office. In the Second World War Leo Negrelli was chief press attaché in the Italian Social Republic. After the Second World War, Negrelli emigrated to Spain where he remained a reference point for various rightwing expats living there. In Spain Negrelli, as editor of the paper Voce dell'Occidente, had contacts with Yves Guérin-Sérac head of Aginter Press.
