= National Front (Italy, 1990) =

Italian political movement founded in 1990

The National Front (Fronte Nazionale, FN) was a neo-fascist political party in Italy.

It was founded in 1990 by Franco Freda and adopted a policy against racial mixing and immigration, whilst also opposing Zionism, what it called 'cosmo-politics', and the influence of the United States and international finance. The group published an economic journal L'antibancor, as well as Rubric, a members' bulletin. It became moribund after the 1995 conviction of Freda and 49 other members of the party under the Scelba Law which banned the refoundation of the National Fascist Party.

== History ==
It was founded in 1990 by Franco Freda and adopted a policy against racial mixing and immigration, whilst also opposing Zionism, what it called 'cosmo-politics', and the influence of the United States and international finance. The group published an economic journal L'antibancor, as well as Rubric, a members' bulletin. It became moribund after the 1995 conviction of Freda and 49 other members of the party under the Scelba Law which banned the refoundation of the National Fascist Party.

== See also ==
- National Front (Italy, 1997)
