= Fasci di Azione Rivoluzionaria =

FAR
- Fasci di Azione Rivoluzionaria
- Leader: Pino Romualdi
- Dates active: 1945/1946–1947
- Active regions: Italy
- Ideology: Italian Fascism; Traditionalism; Anti-Americanism; Anti-communism
- Status: banned

The Fasci di Azione Rivoluzionaria (English: Fasces of Revolutionary Action), abbreviated FAR, was an Italian neofascist paramilitary organization founded in 1946. FAR was the first neofascist group in Italy which led an armed struggle after the collapse of the Fascist Regime.

== Prominent members ==
- Pino Romualdi
- Clemente Graziani
- Cesco Giulio Baghino
- Francesco Petronio
- Roberto Mieville

== New FAR ==
The New FAR also known as Legione Nera (English: Black Legion) was founded in 1951 in Rome. Its members carried out armed attacks against Ministry of Foreign Affairs and US Embassy in Rome.

=== Members of the New FAR ===
- Pino Rauti
- Enzo Erra

Italian traditionalist philosopher Julius Evola was arrested in 1951 and tried. He was suspected to be an ideologist of the FAR.

== See also ==
- Werwolf
- Right-wing terrorism in Italy
- Years of Lead (Italy)
