= Paladin Group (fascist organization) =

Defunct fascist organization in Spain

- Paladín
- Iron cross, which Otto Skorzeny and his followers wore during his life and, most importantly, during his funeral.
- Other name: Paladin
- Leader: Otto Skorzeny
- Founded: 1960s
- Dates active: 1970–1975
- Dissolved: 1975
- Country: Francoist Spain
- Allegiance: SS veteran networks (such as ODESSA)
- Headquarters: Madrid, Spain
- Active regions: Europe
- Ideology: Neo-Nazism; Fascism; Entryism
- Political position: Far-right
- Status: Inactive

The Paladin Group (Spanish: Grupo Paladín) was a far-right organization founded in 1970 in Spain by former Waffen-SS Colonel Otto Skorzeny. It conceived itself as the military arm of the anti-Communist struggle during and after the Cold War. It was a private security contractor, the group's purpose was to recruit and operate security contractors to protect anticommunist countries. The group had active communications with post-war SS veteran networks and can be argued to be one of those networks, differing in the fact that they were also providing troops and training to far-right militias, and was a participant of Operation Condor, providing escape routes for former SS-men who were guilty of war-crimes.

== Ideology ==
The French Nouvel Observateur magazine, of 23 September 1974, qualifies the group as a "strange temporary work agency of mercenaries" (étrange agence d’interim-barbouzes); in The Great Heroin Coup (1976), Henrik Krüger calls it a "fascist group" or "neo-fascist group", while Stuart Christie speaks of it as a "security consultancy group" in Granny Made me an Anarchist. Lobster Magazine describes it as a "small international squad of commandos". One of the Skorzeny's goals was entryism, which meant trying to infiltrate different groups around the world to re-establish SS and Nazi Party. However soon this goals was seemed to be abandoned as the group became a mercenary contractor by the time. There was no ideological stability within the organization; although the far-right element was a constant motive, the organisation was in active communication with anti-American Gaddafi's Libya while also being actively siding with pro-American groups such as Italian militias, showing that there was no fixed goal through the group's lifetime and this made the group earn the infamous title of "terrorists."

== History ==
The Paladin Group was created in 1970 in the Albufereta neighborhood of Alacant, Spain, by former SS Colonel Otto Skorzeny and former US Colonel James Sanders. A former special operations officer, Skorzeny had become a member of the ODESSA network after the war, helping to smuggle Nazi war criminals out of Allied Europe to Spain, South America and other friendly destinations so they could avoid prosecution for war crimes. Skorzeny himself resided after the war in Spain, protected by the Spanish government.

Skorzeny envisioned the Paladin Group as "an international directorship of strategic assault personnel [that would] straddle the watershed between paramilitary operations carried out by troops in uniforms and the political warfare which is conducted by civilian agents".

In addition to recruiting many former SS members, the Group also recruited from the ranks of various right-wing and nationalist organizations, including the French Nationalist OAS, the SAC, and from military units such as the French Foreign Legion. The hands-on manager of the Group was Dr. Gerhard Hartmut von Schubert, formerly of Dr. Joseph Goebbels' Propaganda Ministry, who had trained security personnel in Argentina and Egypt after World War II. Under his guidance, Paladin provided support to the PFLP-EO led by Wadie Haddad at the same time as the Mossad. The Group's other clients included the South African Bureau of State Security. They also worked for the Greek military junta of 1967–1974 and the Spanish Security Main Direction, who recruited some Paladin operatives to wage clandestine war against ETA. The Group also helped Augusto Pinochet’s Regime fight against Communist insurgents after getting the dealing through Stefano Delle Chiaie of The Italian Neo-Fascist Organization known as National Vanguard (Italy) and to have provided personnel for José López Rega's notorious Argentine Anti-Communist Alliance death squad, however, this was never confirmed.

The Paladin Group was also allegedly allied with a number of other right-wing governments, including Salazar’s Portugal, and some of the Italian neo-fascists involved in the years of lead era attacks of the 1970s and 1980s. The Paladin Group also held offices in Zurich, Switzerland.

=== Following Francisco Franco’s death in 1975 ===
Otto Skorzeny died the same year as Francisco Franco, whose death on November 20, 1975 led to the democratization of Spain. Third position political organizations, including Fascists and National Socialists, formerly supported by the Francoist regime ceased to be welcome in the new regime and fled to South America, in particular to Augusto Pinochet’s Chile, and Argentina, where the return of Perón after a 20-year exile in Spain had seen the June 20, 1973, Ezeiza massacre.

=== Legacy ===
Von Schubert became the head of the Paladin Group after Otto Skorzeny’s death in 1975. The group, with the affiliate organisation CEDADE, continued after the death of their leader but ultimately dissolved into far-right groups such as National Democracy, Nuclei Armati Rivoluzionari and Triple A. The group's legacy was also can be allegedly linked to "stay-behind" networks of Operation Gladio in which far-right militias similar to the "Paladin Group" participated in, a possible ideological influence or adoption of strategies.

== See also ==
- Stefano Delle Chiaie
- Aginter Press
- Francoist Spain
- Paladin (disambiguation)

== Bibliography ==
- Stuart Christie, Granny Made me an Anarchist
- L'Express, 13 September 1976
- Henrik Krüger, The Great Heroin Coup: Drugs, Intelligence, and International Fascism, Boston : South End Press, 1980. 240 pages. (First published in Denmark under the title: Smukke Serge og Heroinen en 1976.) ISBN 0-89608-031-5
- Martin A. Lee, The Beast Reawakens, 1997. ISBN 0-316-51959-6 - (pages 185–86)
- Le Nouvel Observateur, 23 September 1974
- E. Gerdan, Dossier A ... comme Armes, édition Alain Moreau, 1975
- Le Monde 2, n° 60 - Special issue on Operation Condor
- Peter Dale Scott, Transnationalised Repression; Parafascism and the U.S., Lobster Magazine, N°12 : 1986.
- Frederic Laurent, L'Orchestre Noir, Stock, 1978.
