= Pino Romualdi =

Italian politician (1913–1988)

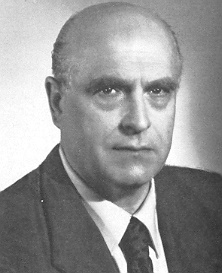

Member of the European Parliament
- In office 17 July 1979 – 21 May 1988
- Constituency: Central Italy

Member of the Senate of the Republic
- In office 12 July 1983 – 2 July 1987
- Constituency: Rome

Member of the Chamber of Deputies
- In office 25 June 1953 – 11 July 1983
- Constituency: Rome (1953–1979); Bologna (1979–1983)

Personal details
- Born: 24 July 1913 Predappio, Italy
- Died: 21 May 1988 (aged 74) Rome, Italy
- Party: Italian Social Movement
- Height: 1.70 m (5 ft 7 in)
- Spouse: Vera Romualdi (m. 1940)
- Children: 2
- Profession: Politician, journalist

Giuseppe "Pino" Romualdi (24 July 1913 – 21 May 1988) was an Italian right-wing politician who served both the Republican Fascist Party (PFR) and the Italian Social Movement (MSI). He was the subject of frequent rumours that he was the biological son of Benito Mussolini, although no proof has been given. Romualdi himself, who was from the same village as Mussolini, encouraged the rumour.

== Biography ==
=== Before World War II ===
Romualdi was born in Predappio, near Forlì, the same comune of Mussolini.

He took a laurea in political science, serving as secretary of the Gruppi universitari fascisti in Forlì from 1936 to 1938, and then worked as a journalist.

Romualdi served as a soldier in the Italian Army in the campaigns in Ethiopia and during the Second World War in Greece and Albania, where he was an infantry captain. He returned to Italy in 1943 and became more prominent in political life with the foundation of the Italian Social Republic in 1943. Here he served as a delegate to the 1943 Congress of Verona and edited the Gazzetta di Parma newspaper. Shortly before the collapse of the Republic he was appointed vice-president of the PFR.

=== Post World War II ===
Romualdi was one of the fascist contingent captured by Urbano Lazzaro's partisans at Dongo, Lombardy in April 1945. However he managed to escape capture and was sentenced to death in absentia. As a fugitive he became involved in terrorist activity and in 1946 was a founder of the neo-fascist Fasci di Azione Rivoluzionaria. However he left this movement, along with his close ally Pino Rauti at the end of the same year to become a leading figure in the new Italian Social Movement. Captured in 1948 his sentence was reduced to four years imprisonment and he was released in 1951, returning to his role as deputy secretary of the MSI.

He went on to become associated with the "liberal" wing of the party that helped secure the leadership for Giorgio Almirante. He again served in the Chamber of Deputies from 1953 to 1979 and then in the Italian Senate from 1983 to 1987. He also edited the journals Lotta Politica, Il Popolo Italiano and Ardito at various times and as MSI deputy secretary oversaw the modernisation of the party's internal structure and played a leading role in drafting their nine-point programme in 1967.

=== European Parliament ===
Romualdi was elected to the European Parliament at the 1979 election and held his seat until his death. He became a leading figure within the far right, serving as vice chair of the Group of the European Right from 1984-1988. He was particularly prominent as a member of the European Parliament Committee on Foreign Affairs.

Romualdi died in Rome of cancer on 21 May 1988, on the same weekend as his former colleagues and fellow Italian Fascist leaders Dino Grandi and Giorgio Almirante. Like Romualdi, Grandi died on 21 May 1988, and Almirante died the following day.

== Electoral history ==
Election	House	Constituency	Party	Votes	Result
1953	Chamber of Deputies	Rome–Viterbo–Latina–Frosinone	MSI	13,287	Elected
1958	Chamber of Deputies	Rome–Viterbo–Latina–Frosinone	MSI	23,473	Elected
1963	Chamber of Deputies	Rome–Viterbo–Latina–Frosinone	MSI	33,339	Elected
1968	Chamber of Deputies	Rome–Viterbo–Latina–Frosinone	MSI	37,905	Elected
1972	Chamber of Deputies	Rome–Viterbo–Latina–Frosinone	MSI	53,416	Elected
1976	Chamber of Deputies	Rome–Viterbo–Latina–Frosinone	MSI	38,783	Elected
1979	Chamber of Deputies	Bologna–Ferrara–Ravenna–Forlì	MSI	6,022	Elected
1979	European Parliament	Central Italy	MSI	133,119	Elected
1983	Senate of the Republic	Lazio – Rome I	MSI	8,874	Elected
1984	European Parliament	Central Italy	MSI	119,905	Elected
