= Adriano Tilgher (politician) =

Italian far-right politician (born 1947)

- Born: 1 October 1947 (age 78); Taranto, Italy
- Occupation: Politician
- Height: 1.82 m (6 ft 0 in)

Adriano Tilgher (born 1 October 1947) is an Italian far-right and neo-fascist politician.

== Early life ==
Born in Taranto, Tilgher began his career as a member of the neo-fascist Italian Social Movement (Movimento Sociale Italiano), although in his youth he was also associated with National Vanguard (Avanguardia Nazionale) and attempted to refound it in 1970. He was given a prison sentence for what was judged an attempt to refound the National Fascist Party (Partito Nazionale Fascista).

== Career ==
In the late 1970s, Tilgher directed the transnational neo-fascist magazine Confidentiel in Rome. It was founded by Stefano Delle Chiaie in Paris in 1979. In 1987, Tilgher founded the National Popular League (Lega Nazionalpopolare), later rebranded as National Popular Alternative (Alternativa Nazional Popolare). Both movements proved short-lived and lacking in support. In 1994, Tilgher and Delle Chiaie co-authored Un meccanismo diabolico. Stragi. Servizi Segreti. Magistrati. The book dealt with what the authors claimed has been their victimisation by the Italian legal system. After giving up on the idea of leading his own movement, he joined Tricolour Flame (Fiamma Tricolore), a splinter group of the newly constituted National Alliance (Alleanza Nazionale), in 1996.

Tilgher was expelled from Tricolour Flame in 1997 for his criticism of the leadership of Pino Rauti. In September 1997, he set up his own party, named National Front (Fronte Nazionale) after the French Front National (Front national), whose leader Jean-Marie Le Pen he invited to Rome during the elections of that year. The party changed its name to National Social Front (Fronte Sociale Nazionale) and was part of the Social Alternative (Alternativa Sociale) coalition led by Alessandra Mussolini until that group dissolved after a poor showing in the 2006 Italian general election. He subsequently formed an alliance with The Right (La Destra) in 2008.
