= Paladin (disambiguation) =

A paladin is one of the legendary knights of Charlemagne's court.

Paladin may also refer to:

== People ==
- Dan Paladin (born 1979), American video game artist and designer
- Soraya Paladin (born 1993), Italian cyclist

== Arts, entertainment, and media ==
=== Fictional characters ===
- Paladin (comics), a Marvel character
- Paladin (Western character), the main character in the television and radio Western series Have Gun – Will Travel
- Paladin, a talking lamp in Glen Michael's Cartoon Cavalcade
- Paladins of Voltron, characters from television series Voltron Legendary Defender
- Paladins, a secret society of religious fanatics in the 2008 film Jumper

=== Games ===
- Paladin (character class), a "holy warrior" in fantasy role-playing games
  - Paladin (Dungeons & Dragons), a character class
- Paladins (video game)
- Paladin, the term for the contestants of the 2014 reality TV show The Quest
- Paladin, a rank in the Brotherhood of Steel in Fallout

=== Literature ===
- The Paladin (Cherryh novel), a 1988 fantasy novel by C. J. Cherryh
- The Paladin (Garfield novel), a 1979 WWII novel by Brian Garfield with Christopher Creighton
- The Paladin, a novel by George Shipway
- The Paladin: As Beheld by a Woman of Temperament, a 1909 novel by Horace Annesley Vachell
- "Paladin of the Lost Hour", a novelette and Twilight Zone episode by Harlan Ellison

=== Music ===
- Paladin (band), a 1970s British progressive rock band
- Les Paladins, a 1760 opera by Jean-Philippe Rameau
- The Paladins, a rockabilly music group

== Brands and enterprises ==
- Northern Counties Paladin, a bus body built in the UK between 1991 and 1998
- Paladin Books, an imprint of the book publisher Grafton
- Paladin Energy Ltd, a uranium production and exploration company
- Paladin Industries, an American aircraft manufacturer
- Paladin Press, a publisher of anarchist-themed books
- Paladin Group (security company), operating in South East Asia and Oceania

== Military ==
- Combined Joint Task Force Paladin, a counter-IED task force during the 21st century War in Afghanistan
- HMS Paladin, several Royal Navy ships
- M109 Paladin, a self-propelled howitzer

== Organizations ==
- Paladin Group (fascist organization), founded in Spain in 1970 by Otto Skorzeny
- Paladin Society, at Emory University

== Sports ==
- Furman Paladins, the sports teams of Furman University in Greenville, South Carolina, USA
- RMC Paladins, the athletic teams of the Royal Military College of Canada in Kingston, Ontario

== Technology ==
- Paladin (chemical), used in pesticides
- Apple Paladin, a computer, phone, scanner, and fax machine produced by Apple Computer
- Nissan Paladin, the name by which the Nissan Xterra sport utility vehicle is sold in China
- NOVO7 Paladin, a tablet computer

== Other uses ==
- Paladin (trilobite), a genus of trilobite

== See also ==
- Chinese Paladin (TV series), a 2005 Chinese series based on the role-playing game The Legend of Sword and Fairy
- Paladin's Grace (2020) and Paladin's Strength (2021), fantasy novels by Ursula Vernon, writing under the nom de plume T. Kingfisher
- Palatinate (disambiguation)
- Palladin
