= Jacques Ploncard d'Assac =

French writer (1910–2005)

Jacques Ploncard (French pronunciation: [ʒak plɔ̃kaʁ]; 13 March 1910 – 20 February 2005), also called "Jacques Ploncard d'Assac" (French pronunciation: [ʒak plɔ̃kaʁ dasak]), was a French writer and journalist and a political activist – he was, among other things, a member of the Parti Populaire Français. Following the fall of the Vichy regime, he escaped to Portugal's Estado Novo in 1945, where he counselled Salazar. He introduced Yves Guérin-Sérac, one of the co-founders of the OAS, to the PIDE. After the April 1974 Carnation Revolution, he returned to France and collaborated on Présent, a newspaper which maintained loose links with Jean-Marie Le Pen's National Front. Jacques Ploncard also wrote Doctrines of Nationalism.

== Selected bibliography ==
- Pourquoi je suis anti-juif (Why I Am Anti-Jew), 1938
- La Franc-maçonnerie ennemie de l'Europe (Freemasonry, Europe's Enemy), 1943
- Doctrines du nationalisme, 1958
- Salazar, 1967

Under the pen-name "La Vouldie":

- Mme Simone de Beauvoir et ses mandarins (Madame Simone de Beauvoir and her Mandarins), 1955
