= Sursum Corda (Italy) =

Sursum Corda was an Italian student movement organized with irredentist purposes before 1914. It may be considered one of the precursors of fascist organizations in Italy and seems to have its origins in the Italian youth organisations from the first years of the 20th century such as the battaglioni studenteschi founded in 1906 (or so) in Milan. The model were the German Burschenschaften.

Their Fiuman member was Nino Host Venturi, According to Host Venturi, he already in 1913 organised a Battaglione studenti volontari "Sursum Corda" in Brescia with students and expats from Austria-Hungary. They trained during weekends in the surrounding hills with the support from Italian regular army officers. In spring 1919 they had already a battalion-strength formation in Trieste. Nino Host Venturi kept the contacts with Gabriele D'Annunzio and organised his arrival in Fiume. Leo Negrelli from Trieste was another affiliate of the “Sursum Corda.”
