= Social Idea Movement =

Social Idea Movement Movimento idea Sociale
- Secretary: Raffaele Bruno
- Founder: Pino Rauti
- Founded: 7 May 2004
- Split from: Tricolour Flame
- Headquarters: Via Maddaloni, 6; 80134 Naples
- Ideology: Neo-fascism
- Political position: Far-right

Website
- movimentoideasocia0.wixsite.com/movideasoc

Social Idea Movement (Movimento Idea Sociale, MIS) is an Italian neo-fascist political party.

It was founded in 2004 by a split of the Tricolour Flame party. Its leader was, until his death Pino Rauti, former leader of the Italian Social Movement and founder of Tricolour Flame. Currently the leader of party is Raffaele Bruno.

In the general elections of 2013 MIS presented itself as Italian Missinian Refoundation (Rifondazione Missina Italiana) only in Campania, getting only 0.01% of vote for the Chamber and 0.00% of vote for the Senate.

== Election results ==
Chamber of Deputies
Election year	# of overall votes	% of overall vote	# of overall seats won	+/–	Leader
2013	3,178 #27	0.00	0 / 630	–	

Senate of the Republic
Election year	# of overall votes	% of overall vote	# of overall seats won	+/–	Leader
2013	2,717 (#44)	0.00	0 / 630	–	
