= Aginter Press =

Anti-communist mercenary organization

- Founded: 1966
- Dissolved: 1974
- Headquarters: Lisbon
- Ideology: Anti-communism
- Status: Inactive

Aginter Press, also known under the names Order and Tradition (Portuguese: Ordem e Tradição) and Armed Organization Against International Communism (French: Organisation Armée contre le Communisme International), was an international anti-communist mercenary organization disguised as a press agency and active between 1966 and 1974. Founded in Lisbon, Portugal in September 1966 under António de Oliveira Salazar's Estado Novo, Aginter Press was set up and directed by Captain Yves Guérin-Sérac, who had been a member of the OAS, a paramilitary and terrorist group which fought against Algerian insurgents towards the end of the Algerian War (1954–1962). Aginter Press trained its members in covert action techniques, including bombings, silent assassinations, subversion techniques, clandestine communication and infiltration and counter-insurgency.

== History ==
The agency was probably established by the Estado Novo as a response to the Portuguese defeat in the anti-colonial war with India and the subsequent Annexation of Goa. The regime was determined to hold on to its remaining colonial possessions in Angola, Mozambique and East Timor, and feared communist subversion in the form of Soviet support to anti-colonial movements, pushing the regime closer towards NATO security doctrine regarding these movements. This agency is alleged to have carried out work for various right-wing authoritarian governments (including Salazar, Francoist Spain, the Suharto regime in Indonesia, the Greek military junta of 1967–1974, etc.) and the South African Apartheid regime. Its agents worked under the cover of reporters or photographers, which allowed them to travel freely.

== Aginter strategic document ==
An Aginter Press document, titled "Our Political Activity," was discovered at the end of 1974 and described the use of pseudo-operations:

Our belief is that the first phase of political activity ought to be to create the conditions favouring the installation of chaos in all of the regime's structures. .. In our view the first move we should make is to destroy the structure of the democratic state under the cover of Communist and pro-Soviet activities. .. Moreover, we have people who have infiltrated these groups and obviously we will have to tailor our actions to the ethos of the milieu — propaganda and action of a sort which will seem to have emanated from our Communist adversaries. .. [These operations] will create a feeling of hostility towards those who threaten the peace of each and every nation [i.e. Communists].

== Members ==
The group was headed by Yves Guérin-Sérac, a Catholic anti-communist activist, former officer of the French Armed Forces and veteran of the Indochina War (1945–54), the Korean War (1950–1953) and the Algerian War (1954–1962). Italian neo-fascist Stefano Delle Chiaie was among the founding members of Aginter Press. Hired in June 1962 by Franco, Yves Guérin-Sérac then chose to go to Salazar's Portugal, which was according to him the last stronghold against Communism and atheism.

When Aginter Press spread from Africa to Latin America in the mid sixties, it has been estimated that 60 per cent of Aginter personnel were recruited out of the OAS.

== Actions ==
Beside Portugal itself, Aginter Press is alleged to have engaged itself against the independentist movements struggling against the Portuguese empire as well as in Italy. It is suspected of having assassinated General Humberto Delgado (1906–1965), founder of the Portuguese National Liberation Front, although this has been disputed since PIDE's officer Rosa Casaco has admitted he was involved in Delgado's assassination.

According to disputed sources, Aginter Press is alleged to have been responsible for the assassinations of anti-colonialist leader Amílcar Cabral (1924–1973), founder of the PAIGC (African Party for the Independence of Guinea and Cape Verde) and Eduardo Mondlane, leader of the liberation movement FRELIMO (Frente de Libertação de Moçambique), in 1969.

== 1969 Piazza Fontana bombing ==
Italian magistrate Guido Salvini, in charge of the investigations concerning the 1969 Piazza Fontana bombing, explained to the Italian senators that:

In these investigations data has emerged which confirmed the links between Aginter Press, Ordine Nuovo and Avanguardia Nazionale... It has emerged that Guido Giannettini [one of the neo-fascists responsible for the bombing] had contacts with Guérin-Sérac in Portugal ever since 1964. It has emerged that instructors of Aginter Press. .. came to Rome between 1967 and 1968 and instructed the militant members of Avanguardia Nazionale in the use of explosives.

== Carnation Revolution ==
During the April 1974 Carnation Revolution which put an end to Salazar's Estado Novo, Yves Guérin-Sérac, João Da Silva and others associates quit Lisbon for Albufereta, Spanish site of the Paladin Group (founded by Otto Skorzeny), near Alicante (Southern Spain). They then escaped with forged French passports to Caracas, with the alleged "benediction of the Foccart networks."

== See also ==
- History of Portugal
- History of the Italian Republic
- Operation Gladio
- Portuguese Colonial Wars
- Stefano Delle Chiaie
- Years of Lead (Italy)
- Yves Guerin-Serac
