= National Front (Italy, 1997) =

National Front Fronte Nazionale
- President: Adriano Tilgher
- Founded: 28 September 1997
- Split from: Tricolour Flame
- Ideology: Neo-fascism; Italian nationalism Souverainism; Anti-globalism; Right-wing socialism Hard euroscepticism Third Position
- Political position: Far-right
- National affiliation: Social Alternative (2004–06); The Right (2008–14)
- Colors: Black
- Chamber of Deputies: 0 / 400
- Senate: 0 / 200
- European Parliament: 0 / 76

Website
- http:// www.frontenazionale.net

The National Front (Fronte Nazionale, FN) is an Italian far-right political party.

The FN had its roots in the Tricolour Flame when two leading radicals, Tomaso Staiti di Cuddia and Adriano Tilgher, were expelled from the party in 1997. As a response Tilgher formed his own group in September of that year, calling it National Front (a name already used twice before on the Italian far right) and basing it on the French National Front of Jean-Marie Le Pen. The party, which initially confined its operations largely to Rome, gained 18,000 votes in that city in the local elections of 1998.

The party began to expand in early 2000, seeking to work with other minor groups on the far right to form a united alternative to the National Alliance. The group reconstituted under the FSN name after a merger with further dissident elements within the Fiamma Tricolore. In March 2003 supporters of the new group protested outside the Swiss embassy against the jailing of Gaston-Armand Amaudruz.

For the 2004 European election the party joined with Social Action and New Force in the Alessandra Mussolini-led coalition Social Alternative, which captured a single seat in the European Parliament. They remained part of this coalition until its dissolution following poor results in the 2006 general election.

In 2008 Tilgher joined with Francesco Storace's group The Right, and the FSN disbanded.

However, in 2013 the party comes out from The Right and regains its autonomy.
