= Pierluigi Concutelli =

Italian terrorist (1944–2023)

- Born: 3 June 1944; Rome, Italy
- Died: 15 March 2023 (aged 78); Rome, Italy
- Other name: il Comandante
- Organization: Ordine Nuovo
- Known for: Acts of terrorism
- Height: 1.79 m (5 ft 10 in)
- Political party: MSI
- Movement: Neofascism
- Opponent: Italian state

Pierluigi Concutelli (3 June 1944 – 15 March 2023), known as The Commander (il Comandante), was an Italian neofascist, terrorist, and bank robber. He styled himself as an "urban guerrilla fighter". He was a member of the far-right organization Ordine Nuovo, and later became the leader of its underground armed unit, Gruppi di Azione Ordinovista.

== Biography ==
Concutelli was born in Rome. After completing his national service in 1966 he enrolled at the University of Palermo in Sicily, where he studied agriculture. By the end of the decade he was frequenting extreme-right wing circles, especially those associated with the Fronte Nazionale, led by Prince Junio Valerio Borghese. He later became a member of both Ordine Nuovo and FUAN (Fronte universitario d'azione nazionale), the university arm of the Italian Social Movement (MSI).

Experienced in handling weapons, Concutelli was sentenced to fourteen months' imprisonment in 1970 for possessing illegal firearms. Going into hiding with other ordinovisti following the group's prohibition in 1973, he departed shortly afterwards for Francoist Spain, where he and fellow neofascist Stefano Delle Chiaie, the founder of Avanguardia Nazionale, assisted the state security forces in carrying out attacks on the Basque separatist group ETA. Concutelli was suspected of murdering two ETA volunteers who had been hiding in France, having allegedly been commissioned by Delle Chiaie to carry out the killings. Both men were also rumoured to have been behind the unsuccessful attempt to kill Chilean politician Bernardo Leighton in October 1975.

Following Franco's death later that year Concutelli returned to Italy, once again becoming a leading figure in the far-right underworld. On 10 July 1976, he killed Deputy Prosecutor Vittorio Occorsio in Rome as punishment for carrying out investigations targeting neofascists, including several who were associated with Ordine Nuovo. He scattered a number of leaflets over Occorsio's body which proclaimed: "Bourgeois justice stops at life sentences, revolutionary justice goes beyond." In February 1977 he was arrested by an anti-terrorist squad, and following a year-long trial was shown the nature of "bourgeois justice" for himself when he was sentenced to life imprisonment for Occorsio's assassination.

Initially held in Regina Coeli prison, Concutelli was later transferred to the maximum-security penitentiary in Novara, where he was responsible for the murders of several fellow inmates. Having been granted dispensation to work during the day at the Barbarossa publishing house in Milan, his sentence was reduced to house arrest in 2009 following a severe stroke. In 2011, he was given a final two-year suspended sentence on the grounds of ill-health, and once that sentence ended he moved into an apartment in Ostia.

In 2008, together with the RAI journalist Giuseppe Ardica, Concutelli published an autobiography, Io, uomo nero. He died in Rome on 15 March 2023, at the age of 78.

== See also ==
- Armed, far-right organizations in Italy
- Years of lead

== Bibliography ==
- Stuart Christie, Stefano Delle Chiaie: Portrait of a Black Terrorist (London: Anarchy Magazine/Refract Publications, 1984). ISBN 0-946222-09-6
- Henry W. Degenhardt and Alan Day, Political Dissent: an International Guide to Dissident, Extra-Parliamentary, Guerrilla, and Illegal Political Movements (Detroit: Gale Research Co., 1983). ISBN 9780810320505
- Donatella della Porta, Clandestine Political Violence, Cambridge University Press, pp. 124–131. ISBN 05-2119-574-8
- Franco Ferraresi, Threats to Democracy: the Radical Right in Italy after the War (Princeton, N.J.: Princeton University Press, 1997). ISBN 9780691044996
- Magnus Linklater, Isabel Hilton and Neal Ascherson, The Nazi Legacy: Klaus Barbie and the International Fascist Connection (New York, N.Y.: Holt, Rinehart and Winston, 1985). ISBN 9780030693038
