= Franco Freda =

Italian neo-Nazi and neo-fascist terrorist (born 1941)

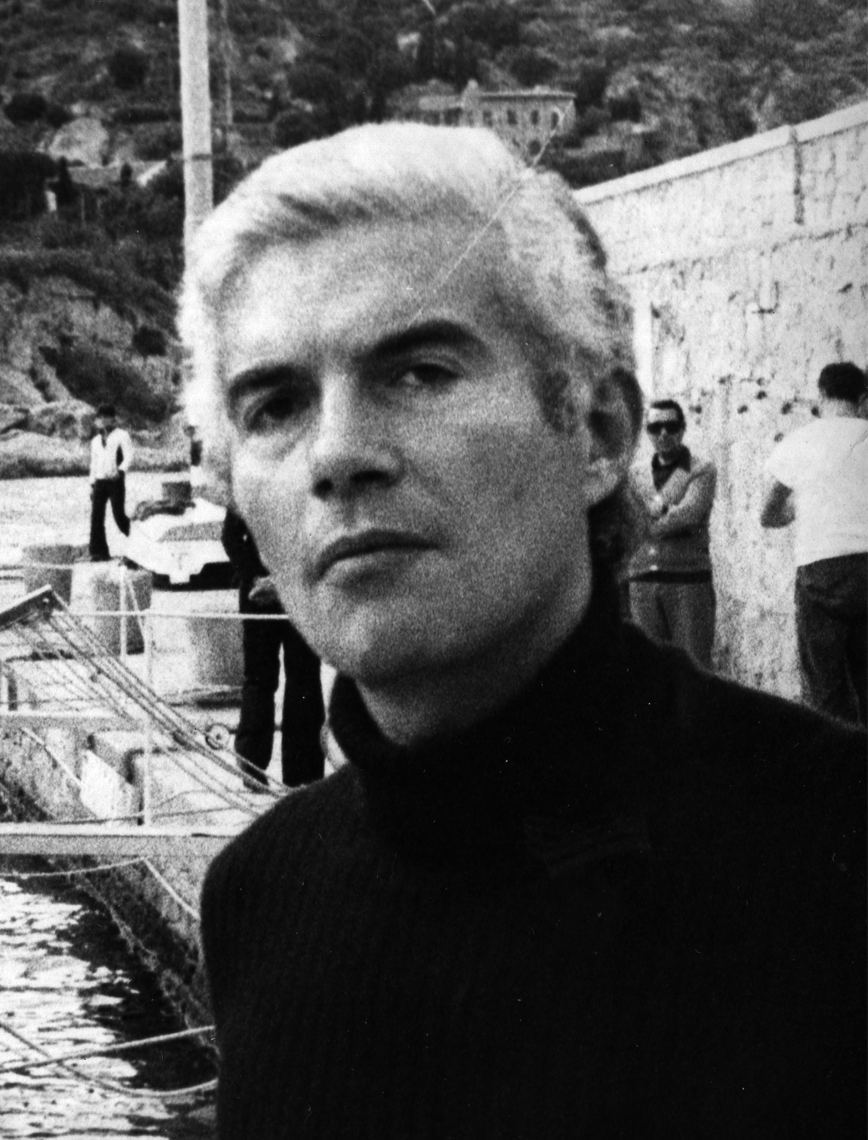
- Freda in 1976
- Born: 11 February 1941 (age 85); Padua, Italy
- Organization: Ordine Nuovo
- Known for: Nazi-Maoism, Piazza Fontana bombing (disputed)

Franco "Giorgio" Freda (born 11 February 1941) is a prominent neo-fascist and neo-Nazi figure in post-war Italy. His views have been described as Nazi-Maoist and antisemitic. He founded a publishing house dedicated to far-right extremism and described himself as an admirer of Hitler. In 1981, he was sentenced to 15 years in prison for "subversive association" in connection with a series of bomb attacks. Although initially convicted of involvement in the 1969 Piazza Fontana bombing, he was later acquitted due to lack of evidence. In 2005 the Court of Cassation found him responsible for the Piazza Fontana bombing, but he could not be prosecuted due to his previous acquittal. In 1990 he founded the Fronte Nazionale, which was disbanded by the Italian government in 2000 when Freda and forty-eight other members were found guilty of attempting to re-establish the National Fascist Party.

== Biography ==
Freda was born in Padua, Italy. He began his political career as the leader of the FUAN-Caravella of Padua (the undergraduates association of the Italian Social Movement) when he was a law student. In 1963, he founded the Group of Ar, based on the philosophy of Julius Evola, and managed a far-right library. Later, when the Group of Ar was disbanded, he founded the Edizioni di Ar (Ar Publishing), a publishing house that brought out books by Traditionalist figures like Evola and René Guenon. Edizioni di Ar is still active today and continues to offer philosophical and political contemporary far-right essays, as well as reissuing books by nineteenth- and twentieth-century writers like Arthur de Gobineau, Oswald Spengler, Friedrich Nietzsche, and Alfred Baeumler.

In 1969, Freda published The Disintegration of the System, which became an important text for the Italian far-right. In this book, Freda broke with the classical anticommunist stance of the far-right and proposed a strategic alliance between the far-left and the far-right to subvert capitalist society. Freda's approach ideologically justified the merging of ultra-radicals from opposite flanks in a common struggle against the Western liberal state and Soviet communism, which was also opposed by Mao's regime in China. He also began to criticise the MSI leadership, accusing it of compromising with the "agonizing democracy of the Republic". This position, along with the proposal of a hierarchical, collectivist State which found its roots explicitly in Plato, earned him the title of "Nazi-Maoist". Freda's ideology influenced many 1970s far-right Italian groups, such as the Lotta di Popolo and Terza Posizione.

Freda called himself a "scholar of ethnicity" and proposed the principles of a "morphological racism". He also described himself as an admirer of Hitler. After contacts with Pino Rauti, he participated in the activities of Ordine Nuovo, even though he never formally joined the movement. From 1971 onwards, he was put on trial several times, notably for his alleged involvement in the Piazza Fontana bombing. Despite his eventual acquittal due to lack of evidence, he was sentenced to 15 years in prison for subversive association. In 1990, he founded the far-right movement Fronte Nazionale and began publishing the journal L'Antibancor, about economical and financial studies.

The Fronte Nazionale, which opposed both globalization and multicultural society, was disbanded by the Italian government in 2000, on the grounds of the Mancino law. Freda and 48 other members were found guilty of "reconstruction of the Fascist party" (which is illegal in Italy). Freda is still present in the far-right scene as an ideologue and publisher, although public appearances and writings are rare.

== Involvement in the Piazza Fontana bombing ==
On 3 March 1972, Freda, his friend Giovanni Ventura, and Pino Rauti, an Italian Social Movement organiser and founder of the far-right movement Ordine Nuovo, were arrested. They were accused of having planned the 25 April 1969 terrorist attacks at the Milan Fair and Railway Station, and of several other attacks on trains carried out on 8 and 9 August of the same year. Freda and Ventura were later accused of involvement in the Piazza Fontana bombing. Investigators gave several reasons they believed the pair were involved:

- The composition of the bombs used in Piazza Fontana was identical to that of explosives that Ventura hid at the home of a friend several days after the attacks.
- The Diehl Junghans timers used in the attack came from a stock of fifty bought by Freda on 22 September 1969 in a Bologna store. Freda later explained that he bought the timers for Mohamed Selin Hamid, an agent of Algeria secret services (whose existence has been denied by Algerian authorities) for the Palestinian resistance. Israeli secret service sources have claimed that no timer of that kind had been used by Palestinians.
- The bags where the bombs were hidden had been bought in Padua, the city where Freda lived, a few days before the attacks.

In 1974, the trial was moved from Milan to Catanzaro. On 4 October 1978 the police discovered that Freda had disappeared from the Catanzaro apartment where he had been staying. On 23 February 1979 he was found guilty for the Piazza Fontana bombing and sentenced to life imprisonment. On 23 August 1979, Freda was arrested in Costa Rica and extradited to Italy. Several more trials followed. On 20 March 1981, Freda was sentenced to 15 years in prison for "subversive association", as he was held responsible for a series of bombings, but his life sentence for the Piazza Fontana bombing was overturned on 1 August 1985 for lack of evidence. Ventura's sentence was also overturned. In 1987, the Supreme Court of Cassation acquitted Freda and Ventura of the Piazza Fontana bombing for lack of evidence, but Freda's 15-year prison sentence for other related charges was upheld. Freda claimed the 15-year sentence was a "badge of honour".

In the 1990s, new investigations into Piazza Fontana were made. Investigators have claimed that due to new witnesses they believe Freda and Ventura were involved in the terrorist attack. The pair cannot be put on trial again as they were acquitted of the crime in 1987. In a 2004 trial of neo-fascists, the Milan Court of Appeal attributed the bombing to Freda and Ventura. In 2005, the Court of Cassation established Freda's responsibility for the bombing, as well as that of Giovanni Ventura. Because of their previous acquittal in 1987, they could not be prosecuted, but the court deemed it legitimate to use evidence against them in trials of other defendants, confirming their role in the attack.

== Bibliography ==
- Ferraresi, Franco (1996). Threats to Democracy: The Radical Right in Italy After the War. Princeton, New Jersey: Princeton University Press. ISBN 0-691-04499-6.
- Lebourg, Nicolas (2015). "Chapter 6: Arriba Eurasia? The Difficult Establishment of Neo-Eurasianism in Spain". In Laruelle, Marlène (ed.). Eurasianism and the European Far Right: Reshaping the Europe–Russia Relationship. Lexington Books. ISBN 978-1498510684.
- Fabrizio Calvi, Frédéric Laurent, Piazza Fontana - La verità su una strage, Mondadori (ISBN 8804406984) (Italian)
- AA.VV (ed. by F. Ferraresi), La destra radicale, Feltrinelli, Milano 1984 (Italian)
- Franco Ferraresi, Minacce alla democrazia, Feltrinelli, Milano 1995 (Italian)
- Chiara Stellati, Una ideologia dell'Origine. Franco Freda e la controdecadenza, Edizioni di Ar, Padova 2001 (Italian)
- AA.VV., Piazza Fontana: una vendetta ideologica, Edizioni di Ar, Padova 2005. (Italian)
