= Waffen-SS veterans in post-war Germany =

Waffen-SS veterans in post-war Germany played a large role, through publications and political pressure, in the efforts to rehabilitate the reputation of the Waffen-SS, which had committed numerous war crimes during World War II. High ranking German politicians courted former Waffen-SS members and their veteran organisation, HIAG. A small number of veterans, somewhat controversially, served in the new German armed forces, the Bundeswehr.

Apart from war-time leaders of the Waffen-SS like Paul Hausser or Kurt Meyer, who published a number of revisionist or uncritical books on the Waffen-SS, former enlisted members also rose to prominence, like Günter Grass, who received the Nobel Prize in Literature in 1999 and actor Hardy Krüger.

In the post-war years HIAG exercised some political influence in West Germany, and made attempts to appeal to the mainstream parties, but this changed in the 1960s when the veteran organisation, having achieved its aim, shifted to extreme right-wing politics. HIAG itself greatly exaggerated its influence and, at no point, represented more than eight percent of all the Waffen-SS veterans in West Germany.

A historical review in Germany of the impact of Waffen-SS veterans in post-war German society continues, and a number of books on the subject have been published in recent years.

== In post-war Germany ==
=== Political influence ===
Like with the myth of the clean Wehrmacht, the erroneous perception that the Wehrmacht was not involved in war crimes and atrocities during World War II, a similar perception existed about the Waffen-SS, in parts driven by its former members. Efforts were made to portray the Waffen-SS as a fourth arm of the Wehrmacht and to shift all blame of war crimes and the Holocaust to the other branches of the SS, thereby portraying Waffen-SS men as "soldiers like any other" (German: Soldaten wie alle anderen auch). This view was supported and advocated by high-profile conservative politicians in post-war West Germany. Konrad Adenauer, Chancellor of West Germany at the time, stated in 1953 in front of members of his party, the Christian Democratic Union, that:

The men of the Waffen-SS were soldiers like everybody else ... try to explain to other countries that the Waffen-SS had no connections with the Sicherheitsdienst and Gestapo! Try to explain to people that the Waffen-SS has not shot any Jews, but instead was a formation of soldiers that was most feared by the Soviets.

Franz Josef Strauss, West Germany's then-Minister of Defence, a World War II veteran, stated in a letter to HIAG in March 1957: "I think you know how I personally think about the front line units of the Waffen-SS. They are included in my admiration for the German soldiers of the last world war." Adenauer's statement that the Waffen-SS were soldiers like everybody else inspired former high-ranking commander of the Waffen-SS Paul Hausser to use this statement as a title for his book, Soldaten wie andere auch: Der Weg der Waffen-SS (Soldiers like any other: The Path of the Waffen-SS).

=== HIAG ===
HIAG (German: Hilfsgemeinschaft auf Gegenseitigkeit der Angehörigen der ehemaligen Waffen-SS, lit. 'Mutual aid association of former Waffen-SS members') made efforts to appeal to the mainstream parties on the right and left in the 1950s and claimed to represent up to 2,000,000 potential voters in West Germany. In reality, only 250,000 former Waffen-SS veterans lived in the country and only eight percent of those were members of HIAG. In the early 1960s HIAG made a gradual shift to extreme right-wing politics. By the early 1980s, German mainstream parties had all banned membership for HIAG members.

The political influence of HIAG resulted in a number of Waffen-SS veterans receiving the same pensions as Wehrmacht veterans.

=== Waffen-SS and the Bundeswehr ===
The issue of Waffen-SS veterans in West German society came to a head when West Germany rearmed and formed the Bundeswehr in 1955. The initial intention was not to admit any former Waffen-SS men, but this was soon changed to allow former members up to the rank of Obersturmbannführer (lieutenant colonel). Public opinion was split on the subject, as many people in Germany had suffered under the Nazi regime, too, while many others had voluntarily or involuntarily been members of Nazi organisations like the SS. The exclusion of former Waffen-SS men was criticised by HIAG who attempted to draw a distinction between the "honourable" Waffen-SS and "evil" Allgemeine-SS, notwithstanding the fact that up to 60,000 Waffen-SS men had also served with the SS in the concentration and extermination camps.

The admittance of former Waffen-SS personnel to the new Bundeswehr created some unease with the former Allied powers, Britain, France, and the US. West Germany received a conditional approval from the United States Department of State for the admittance of former Waffen-SS personnel into the armed forces on the grounds that the number of applications was small and the selection process would be careful. It clarified its position after a question by the American Jewish Committee as to how much such a step would impact the democratic nature of the new German armed forces. From the German side, rejecting the former SS members was seen as politically dangerous as the estimated 500,000 Waffen-SS veterans, a number later found to be too high, were too large a group to be ignored as potential voters. HIAG and Waffen-SS veterans were not just courted by the conservative West German government; opposition leader Kurt Schumacher also remained on good terms with the organisation.

The number of applications from former Waffen-SS men for the new Bundeswehr remained low, with 3,117 applications received by September 1956, of which 508 were accepted, 33 of those being officers. Despite the promised screening process, at least one member of the Allgemeine-SS was approved, Major Ulrich Besch, who had been a guard at the Buchenwald concentration camp. Overall the number of former Waffen-SS members in the Bundeswehr never exceeded 770. By comparison, the same screening of former SS members was not applied to the Federal Criminal Police Office, where 33 out of the 57 leading officials were former members of the SS.

=== Secret army ===
In 2014 files of the German intelligence service, the Bundesnachrichtendienst, were declassified and revealed that 2,000 former officers of the Wehrmacht and Waffen-SS in 1949 formed a 40,000 man secret army in West Germany, the Schnez-Truppe. The driving force behind this secret force was Albert Schnez, later the Inspector of the Army, who planned to arm it with weapons from the police. The West German government became aware of the organisation in 1951 and tasked the predecessor organisation of the Bundesnachrichtendienst, the Gehlen Organization, with monitoring the activities, but otherwise took little action. The declassified files, reviewed by German historian Agilolf Keßelring, grandson of Albert Kesselring, who is part of an independent commission to study the early history of the German intelligence service, also revealed that the secret army was tasked with spying on politicians of the opposition and, in case of an invasion by the Soviet Union, was to retreat to a neighbouring country and liberate Germany from there. In case of civil war it was tasked with neutralising communists in West Germany.

The fate of this secret army after the formation of the Bundeswehr is unclear. What is known is that many former members, among them high-ranking NATO officials Adolf Heusinger and Hans Speidel, joined the new German armed forces.

=== Commemoration controversies ===
A visit to the Bitburg war cemetery by US President Ronald Reagan and West German Chancellor Helmut Kohl sparked the Bitburg controversy, as the cemetery also contained 49 graves of Waffen-SS men, members of the 2nd SS Panzer Division "Das Reich". Kohl, who had come to power in 1982, had removed restrictions on Waffen-SS veteran gatherings and associations and de-listed them from the register of right-wing groups that were required to be watched by the West German Ministry of the Interior.

Three days after the Bitburg events, on the anniversary of the German surrender in 1945, veterans of the Leibstandarte, Hitler Youth, and the Totenkopf divisions held reunions in Nesselwang, which drew international attention. Associations representing the victims of Nazism called for a ban of such gatherings, but no legal grounds could be found for such actions. The events attracted between 250 and 500 veterans from each division, but also protests by over 400 people from anti-fascist groups.

In 1993 the commander of the German III Corps in Koblenz, Lieutenant General Klaus Reinhardt, was heavily criticised by high-ranking conservative politician Alfred Dregger for banning Bundeswehr soldiers from participating in a memorial service at a German war cemetery that also held the graves of fallen Waffen-SS soldiers on Volkstrauertag. Reinhardt argued that he meant no disrespect to the young soldiers that had died for Germany but found that the ideology of the Waffen-SS was incompatible with the values of democracy.

Commemorations for fallen Waffen-SS soldiers continue to this day and attract some controversy in Germany as these are often associated with the Neo-Nazi scene. Speeches and songs often include themes from the Nazi era but participants can only be prosecuted if these include banned material.

=== Notable veterans ===
A number of former Waffen-SS members achieved success in post-war Germany, not all of them disclosing their past. Günter Grass, who received the Nobel Prize in Literature in 1999, only admitted in 2006 that he joined the SS in 1944. Actor Hardy Krüger was conscripted to the Waffen-SS in 1945, having starred in propaganda movies before that, but was almost executed for refusing to fire on American troops and admitted his past early on in his career. Another prominent German actor, Horst Tappert, kept his past secret and only five years after his death was it made public that he had served in the 3rd SS Panzer Division "Totenkopf" from 1942. East German painter Bernhard Heisig who volunteered for the SS in 1942, admitted his past early and joined the communist party after the war. Journalist and Waffen-SS volunteer Franz Schönhuber spent 35 years working for mainstream Bavarian newspapers and the Bayerischer Rundfunk, Bavarian state television, before his autobiography in 1981 saw him dismissed from his role for diminishing Nazi crimes, after which he turned to right-wing politics where he enjoyed moderate success.

=== Research ===
While literature about the Waffen-SS and its performance during the war in post-war Germany was plentiful, some of it extremely uncritical, research into the organisation's influence in post-war Germany is less extensive. German historian Bastian Hein published Die SS. Geschichte und Verbrechen in 2015 which, in its final chapter, deals with the post-war years and the trials and career paths of former members. Two German historians, Jan Erik Schulte and Michael Wildt, published Die SS nach 1945: Entschuldungsnarrative, populäre Mythen, europäische Erinnerungsdiskurse in 2018, which deals with the post-war trials and the influence and connections former Waffen-SS veterans enjoyed in Germany. It also touches on the attempts to mythologise the Waffen-SS and the attempts to change its perception in popular culture.

Modern research in Germany has come to the conclusion that, from a military point of view, the impact of the Waffen-SS has been greatly exaggerated. According to Bastian Hein, the author of Die SS. Geschichte und Verbrechen (The SS: History and Crime), associated with the German Chancellery, the Waffen-SS was not an elite formation, given that at any one time it had no more than 370,000 members. This accounted for just four percent of the strength of the German armed forces during World War II, and that it made virtually no contribution in the first years of the war, when Germany was generally victorious. He argues that the fanaticism of the SS led to high losses but limited military success. According to historian George Stein, the Waffen-SS never obtained total "independence of command", nor was it ever a "serious rival" to the German Army. Even though it underwent rapid war-time expansion, even at its peak the Waffen-SS remained under 10% of the Wehrmacht.

=== Pensions ===
SS veterans have been reported to be receiving pensions for war injuries.
