= Apple Paladin =

All-in-one prototype by Apple Inc

The Paladin was a conceptual combination of a computer, fax machine, scanner, and telephone all-in-one designed by Apple Computer as a single office solution for a small business, as well as for use in hotel rooms for business travelers. It also went under the code name "Project X" during 1995.

It had a monochrome LCD screen and a phone handset attached to it (which fell off its hook too readily). Very few were prototyped and they are a rare find. The system ran software called "Complete Office", which allowed the change between fax, phone, and PC all with the press of a button on the keypad. It also allowed for the user dial without needing to switch through multiple manual software protocols. By 1995 the engineers who had worked on the customized version of the OS were no longer working on the project making stability a major impediment.

Substantial conceptual work was done by the product design firm IDEO.
