= National Vanguard (Italy) =

Far-right Italian neo-fascist and neo-Nazi groups in Italy

- Avanguardia Nazionale
- Flag of the Avanguardia Nazionale
- Leaders: Stefano Delle Chiaie; Adriano Tilgher
- Dates active: 1960–1976
- Active regions: Italy
- Ideology: Neo-fascism; Neo-Nazism
- Political position: Far-right
- Wars: Years of Lead

The National Vanguard (Italian: Avanguardia Nazionale) is a name that has been used for at least two neo-fascist and neo-Nazi groups in Italy.

== Original group ==
The original National Vanguard was an extra-parliamentary movement formed as a breakaway group from the Italian Social Movement (MSI) by Stefano Delle Chiaie in 1960, initially based around a group of youths recruited by the government to break up leftist meetings. The Vanguard rejected the parliamentary route of the Social Movement, preferring instead to work outside the political system to subvert democracy and bring about a return to fascism. A leaflet produced by the group described them as in favour of "man-to-man engagements" in which their members were to be encouraged to be as ruthless as possible.

Members of the movement were frequently denounced as terrorists and it was claimed that Della Chiaie had links to bomb making concerns in Spain. The group also had close links with Ordine Nuovo and other extremist groups. Vincenzo Vinciguerra was a notorious member of the group. The group was adjudged responsible for a series of bomb attacks in Italy in 1969, the most notorious of which was the Piazza Fontana bombing. The group also took a leading role in the abortive coup attempt by Junio Valerio Borghese the following year.

Avanguardia Nazionale is also accused of organising the assassination of Italian magistrate Vittorio Occorsio, allegedly employing arms supplied by the CIA via its contacts in Francoist Spain, although no firm evidence exists to support this allegation. For the killing Pierluigi Concutelli, not a member of Avanguardia Nazionale at the time, served a life sentence in Italy. Avanguardia Nazionale member Mario Ricci participated to the 1978 assassination of Argala, the etarra who had taken part, five years before, in the assassination of Francisco Franco's prime minister, Luis Carrero Blanco.

== Second group ==
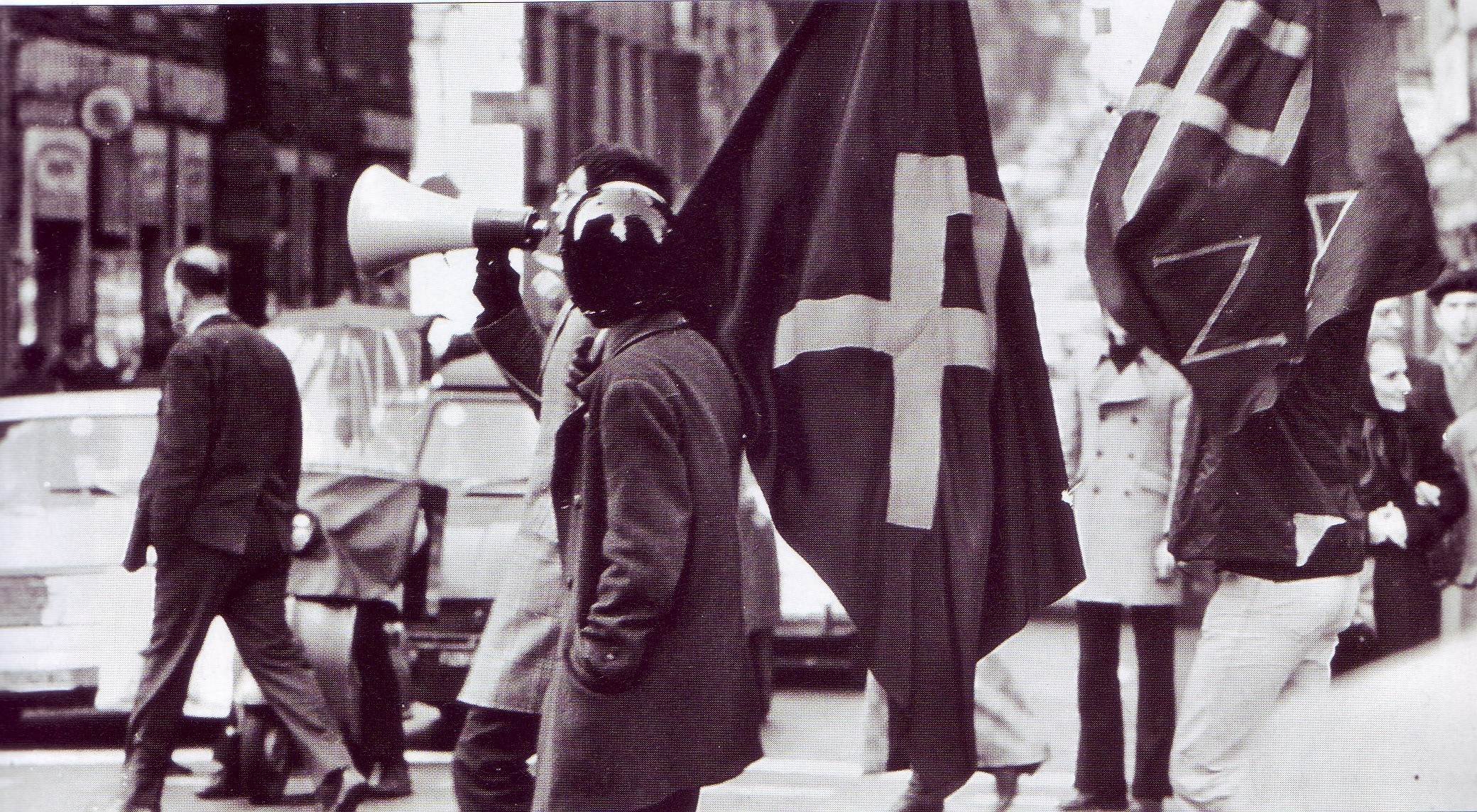
Avanguardia Nazionale members marching in Rome, 1975

A second group bearing this name was set up in 1970 by Adriano Tilgher, but this movement was outlawed by the Italian government, who saw it as an attempt to refound the National Fascist Party.

== Magazine ==
A neo-fascist magazine entitled Avanguardia continues to be published monthly. It may claim to be the official organ of the National Vanguard, although the movement remains illegal in Italy—the official movement to which Avanguardia is connected is the Comunità Politica di Avanguardia (Political Vanguard Community).
