= Vincenzo Vinciguerra =

Italian activist (born 1949)

- Born: Vincenzo Vinciguerra; 3 January 1949 (age 77); Catania, Italy
- Occupations: Terrorist; Writer
- Height: 1.70 m (5 ft 7 in)

Vincenzo Vinciguerra (born 3 January 1949) is an Italian neo-fascist activist, a former member of the Avanguardia Nazionale ("National Vanguard") and Ordine Nuovo ("New Order"). He is currently serving a life-sentence for the murder of three Carabinieri by a car bomb in Peteano in 1972. The investigation in this previously unsolved affair by prosecutor Felice Casson led to the revelation of "Gladio" networks around Western Europe.

== 1972 Peteano bombing ==
Following juridical investigations, it has been discovered that the C4 explosive (the most powerful explosive available at the time) used in the 1972 bombing came from a Gladio arms dump located beneath a cemetery near Verona, whose existence was revealed to judges Felice Casson and Carlo Mastelloni by Giulio Andreotti, former Prime minister of Italy. Judge Casson's investigations revealed that Marco Morin, an explosives expert who worked for the Italian police and a member of Ordine Nuovo far-right group, had deliberately provided a fake expertise, claiming that the explosives used were the same that the Red Brigades used. However, Casson demonstrated that the explosives were in fact C4, which was used by NATO. A group of Carabinieri had accidentally discovered on February 24, 1972, an arms dump near Trieste, containing arms, munitions and C4 identical to the one used in Peteano the same year. According to conspiracy theorist Daniele Ganser:

Casson's investigation revealed that the right-wing organization Ordine Nuovo had collaborated very closely with the Italian Military Secret Service, SID (Servizio Informazioni Difesa). Together, they had engineered the Peteano terror and then wrongly blamed the militant extreme Italian left, the Red Brigades. Judge Casson identified Ordine Nuovo member Vincenzo Vinciguerra as the man who had planted the Peteano bomb... He confessed and testified that he had been covered by an entire network of sympathizers in Italy and abroad who had ensured that after the attack he could escape. 'A whole mechanism came into action', Vinciguerra recalled, 'that is, the Carabinieri, the Minister of the Interior, the customs services and the military and civilian intelligence services accepted the ideological reasoning behind the attack.'

According to Vinciguerra, the 1969 Piazza Fontana bombing was supposed to push then Interior Minister Francesco Restivo to declare a state of emergency.

== Testimony concerning the 1980 Bologna massacre ==
In 1984, questioned by judges about the 1980 Bologna station bomb Vinciguerra said: "With the massacre of Peteano, and with all those that have followed, the knowledge should by now be clear that there existed a real live structure, occult and hidden, with the capacity of giving a strategic direction to the outrages...[it] lies within the state itself...There exists in Italy a secret force parallel to the armed forces, composed of civilians and military men, in an anti-Soviet capacity, that is, to organise a resistance on Italian soil against a Russian army...A secret organisation, a super-organisation with a network of communications, arms and explosives, and men trained to use them...A super-organisation which, lacking a Soviet military invasion which might not happen, took up the task, on NATO's behalf, of preventing a slip to the left in the political balance of the country. This they did, with the assistance of the official secret services and the political and military forces.

Vinciguerra explained how the Italian secret services had protected him, helping him flying away to Francoist Spain.

According to Ganser, Gladio stopped protecting Vinciguerra as soon as he started talking, which permitted his subsequent trial.

== Vinciguerra's allegations concerning NATO ==
Vinciguerra also made this statement to The Guardian: "The terrorist line was followed by camouflaged people, people belonging to the security apparatus, or those linked to the state apparatus through rapport or collaboration. I say that every single outrage that followed from 1969 fitted into a single, organised matrix... Avanguardia Nazionale, like Ordine Nuovo [the main right-wing terrorist group active during the 1970s], were being mobilised into the battle as part of an anti-communist strategy originating not with organisations deviant from the institutions of power, but from within the state itself, and specifically from within the ambit of the state's relations within the Atlantic Alliance." He also appeared and made similar allegations in a BBC documentary on Gladio.

== Testimony concerning Chilean general Carlos Prats' 1974 assassination ==
Along with Stefano Delle Chiaie, Vinciguerra testified in Rome in December 1995 before judge María Servini de Cubría that Enrique Arancibia Clavel, a former Chilean secret police agent prosecuted for crimes against humanity in 2004, and U.S. expatriate DINA agent Michael Townley were directly involved in Chilean General Carlos Prats' assassination in Buenos Aires, Argentina.

== See also ==
- Mariano Rumor (in an interview, Vincenzo Vinciguerra declared that he was asked to kill Mariano Rumor)
- Years of Lead (Italy)
