= Ordine Nuovo =

Far-right organization

New Order Scholarship Center Centro Studi Ordine Nuovo
- Formation: 1956; 70 years ago
- Dissolved: 1973
- Type: Third Position political movement
- Purpose: Neo-fascism; Traditionalism; Revolutionary nationalism Corporatism; Organic democracy
- Headquarters: Rome
- Location: Italy
- Founder: Pino Rauti
- Principal ideologists: Julius Evola
- Key people: Adriano Romualdi; Clemente Graziani
- Main organ: Ordine Nuovo

Ordine Nuovo (Italian for 'New Order'; full name: Centro Studi Ordine Nuovo, "New Order Scholarship Center") was an Italian far-right cultural and extra-parliamentary political and paramilitary organization founded by Pino Rauti in 1956. It had been the most important extra-parliamentary neofascist organization of the post-war Italian republic.

The name is shared by Movimento Politico Ordine Nuovo, a splinter group of Centro Studi Ordine Nuovo.

The organization, considered as an attempt at reforming the Fascist Party (banned by the Constitution), was forcibly dissolved by the Italian government in 1973. Remaining elements of the group formed the Ordine Nero (Black Order) in 1974.

Members and a leader of Movimento Politico Ordine Nuovo were involved in several terrorist attacks, such as the 1969 Piazza Fontana bombing.

== History ==
Previously, L'Ordine Nuovo ("The New Order") had been the name of a radical left-wing paper edited by Antonio Gramsci in the early 1920s, with Gramsci's followers being nicknamed "ordinovisti". However, later on the term—in Italian and various other languages—was appropriated by Fascists and Nazis, its original left-wing predecessors forgotten.

The extreme right-wing organization here referred to, whose members were also nicknamed ordinovisti, though being the political opposite of the earlier ones, was born from an internal current and then a schism in the Movimento Sociale Italiano (MSI). In 1954 Arturo Michelini, a moderate seeking an alliance with the Italian Monarchic Party, and possibly with the Christian Democracy, became general secretary of the MSI. This led to the schism of the most intransigent and spiritualist, Evolian current (Nazism was also a reference), led by Pino Rauti, Lello Graziani and Sergio Baldassini. They refused any compromise that brought the party apart from aristocratic principles. The intransigent and spiritualist Ordine Nuovo was then founded in Rome, but still a part of the MSI.

The real break with MSI happened at the MSI congress in Milan in 1956. Pino Rauti declared that, being disappointed with the moderate drift of the MSI, his movement would abandon the political scene, creating the "Centro Studi Ordine Nuovo", an association dedicated to "political studies and analysis". This wanted to be a literal application of the ideology of Julius Evola, that is, an aristocratic refusal of modern, materialist society. One Ordine Nuovo publication stated, "The work of Ordine Nuovo from 1953 to the present has been nothing but an effort to transfer J. Evola's teachings to the political level." Evola in turn endorsed the Ordine Nuovo as "the only group that has held fast in its doctrine, without stooping to compromise." ON's publications valorized the defeated Axis powers and prewar Fascist movements, as well as the Organisation armée secrète and the militaries of South Africa and Rhodesia, among others. ON rejected all the characteristic institutions of modernity—capitalism, socialism, parliamentary democracy, etc. It was also strongly antisemitic.

Ordine Nuovo, nonetheless, had a capillary and hierarchical organization on the Italian territory, and often behaved more like an extra-parliamentary political organization than a simple "scholarship center".

Ordine Nuovo had around ten thousand members in the mid-1960s.

Ordine Nuovo had an aboveground existence as a political activist group, but its members also engaged in street-fighting (squadrismo) and became involved in several coup attempts and terrorist attacks.

Ordine Nuovo had links with other neofascist groups outside Italy, including the New European Order and Jeune Europe It also had links with Italian intelligence agencies (SIFAR and its successor agency SID), which were a source of funding.

== Splinter group ==
New Order Political Movement
- Movimento Politico Ordine Nuovo
- Leader: Clemente Graziani (1959–73)
- Founded: 21 December 1969
- Dissolved: 21 November 1973
- Split from: New Order Scholarship Center
- Country: Italy
- Newspaper: Anno Zero; Ordine Nuovo Azione
- Ideology: Neo-fascism; Neo-Nazism; Fascist mysticism Traditionalism
- Political position: Far-right
- Status: Banned/Inactive

In 1969, Rauti, along with most of Ordine Nuovo, came back to the MSI party, then led by Giorgio Almirante. The remaining hardliners founded Movimento Politico Ordine Nuovo ("New Order Political Movement").

The motto of Ordine Nuovo was Il nostro onore si chiama fedeltà, or "Our honour is named loyalty", also the motto of the Waffen SS (Meine Ehre heißt Treue). The symbol of the organization was a double-head axe.

=== Implication in terrorist attacks ===
Several members of Movimento Politico Ordine Nuovo, including one of its leaders, Pierluigi Concutelli, participated in terrorist attacks.

==== 1969 Piazza Fontana bombing ====
On 12 December 1969, unknown individuals placed a bomb in Piazza Fontana in Milan, killing 16 and wounding 90. This bombing marked the beginning of the "strategy of tension" in Italy. At various times groups from both left and right have been accused of being behind the attack. Ordine Nuovo member Delfo Zorzi was among those convicted for the crime on 20 June 2001, together with Carlo Maria Maggi and Giancarlo Rognoni, but all were later found not guilty in 2004.

== Notable members ==
- Pierluigi Concutelli (leader of underground armed unit)
- Carlo Cicuttini (member)
- Delfo Zorzi (member)
- Pino Rauti (founder)
- Vincenzo Vinciguerra (member)

== See also ==
- Franco Freda (sympathizer)
- Konstantinos Plevris (sympathizer)
- Operation Gladio
- 1969 Piazza Fontana bombing
- 1974 Piazza della Loggia bombing
- Armed, far-right organizations in Italy
- Jeune Europe
