= Pino Rauti =

Italian politician (1926–2012)

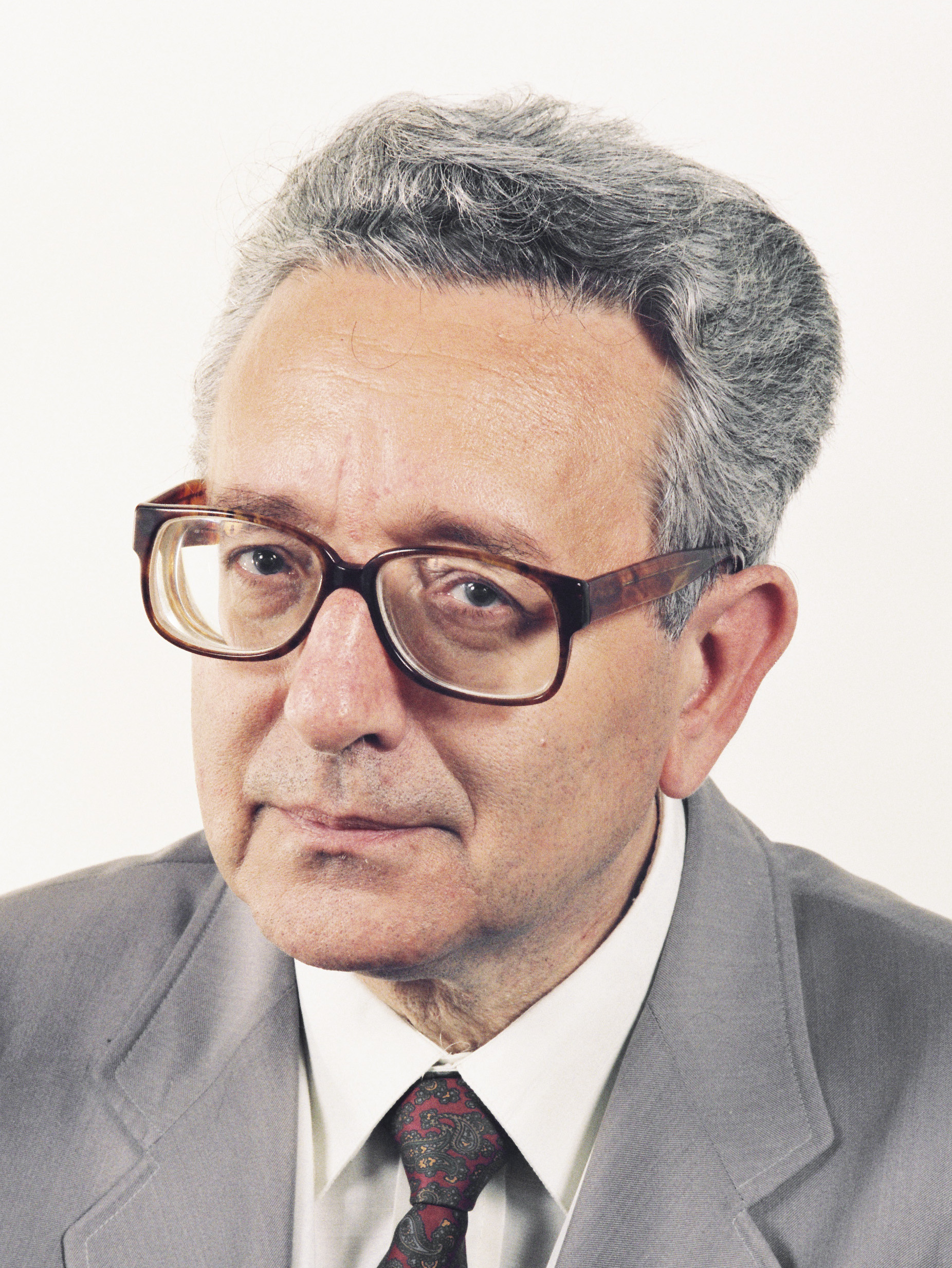

Secretary of the Italian Social Movement
- In office 14 January 1990 – 7 July 1991
- Preceded by: Gianfranco Fini
- Succeeded by: Gianfranco Fini

Member of the European Parliament
- In office 25 July 1989 – 19 July 1999
- Constituency: Central Italy

Member of the Chamber of Deputies
- In office 25 May 1972 – 22 April 1992
- Constituency: Rome

Personal details
- Born: 19 November 1926 Cardinale, Italy
- Died: 2 November 2012 (aged 85) Rome, Italy
- Party: PFR (1943–1945); MSI (1947–1957); ON (1957–1969); MSI (1969–1995); FT (1995–2002); MIS (2004–2012)
- Height: 1.68 m (5 ft 6 in)
- Spouse: Brunella Rauti
- Children: Isabella Rauti
- Occupation: Journalist, politician

Military service
- Allegiance: Italian Social Republic (1943–1945)
- Branch/service: National Republican Guard
- Years of service: 1943–1945
- Rank: Capomanipolo
- Battles/wars: World War II: Italian Campaign

Giuseppe Umberto "Pino" Rauti (19 November 1926 – 2 November 2012) was an Italian neo-fascist politician who was a leading figure of the Italian far-right for many years. Involved in active politics since 1948, he was one of founders and for many years the leader of the Italian Social Movement (MSI). He was the main representative of the MSI's radical faction until the party dissolution in 1995.

== Early years ==
Rauti was born in Cardinale, Calabria. As a youth, Rauti volunteered for the Guardia Nazionale Repubblicana of the Italian Social Republic before briefly going into exile with the Spanish Foreign Legion. Rauti returned to Italy in 1946 and joined the Italian Social Movement (MSI) two years later. He became a leading member of the party and also joined the New European Order initiative. He became associated with Julius Evola and, along with Enzo Erra, served as editor of his journal Imperium. Such was Rauti's support for Evola's philosophy that his own theoretical writings demonstrated so much of his mentor's influences as to be at times plagiarism.

In 1954 he established his own group within the MSI based around the Imperium group, the Ordine Nuovo. However Rauti became disillusioned with the MSI, particularly after the party supported the presidency bid of Giovanni Gronchi and the premiership of Giuseppe Pella, and so his group split off at the 1956 party conference, with Rauti launching a tirade of abuse at the MSI leadership as he left.

== Terrorism allegations ==
Alongside his political career Rauti was also the subject of a series of allegations linking him to the terror campaigns associated with the strategy of tension. A noted anti-communist, Rauti sought to use a twin-track approach against communists, with both strands calling for violent action. He supported the old tactic of direct street fights with far left militia groups but also endorsed a process of infiltrating these groups and thus provoking them to more action and more direct confrontation with law enforcement. Rauti hoped that his policy would create an atmosphere of civil unrest that he hoped would be more conducive to a neo-fascist takeover.

Rauti's name cropped up in the inquiry into the Piazza Fontana bombing whilst he had also been named as having attended high-level terrorism planning meetings in Padua in 1969. The Treviso magistrates brought Rauti to trial in 1972 over possible involvement in the Piazza Fontana attack but ultimately he was acquitted due to a lack of evidence. Rauti was aided in this by being able to provide an alibi for the Padua meeting.

Rauti was known to be close to Mario Merlino and by extension was linked to Merlino's close comrade Stefano Delle Chiaie. He also collaborated with former Ordine Nuovo member Franco Freda, producing a series of pamphlets with him in the 1960s. Some documents have also claimed that Rauti was either a 'contact' or a paid informer for the head of the Servizio Informazioni Difesa, which was itself linked to the strategy of tension. It has also been suggested that he was responsible for setting up the Nuclei Armati Rivoluzionari along with Guido Giannettini. However, there was never any concrete evidence to link Rauti to terrorism and he was never convicted of any offences.

== Return to the MSI ==
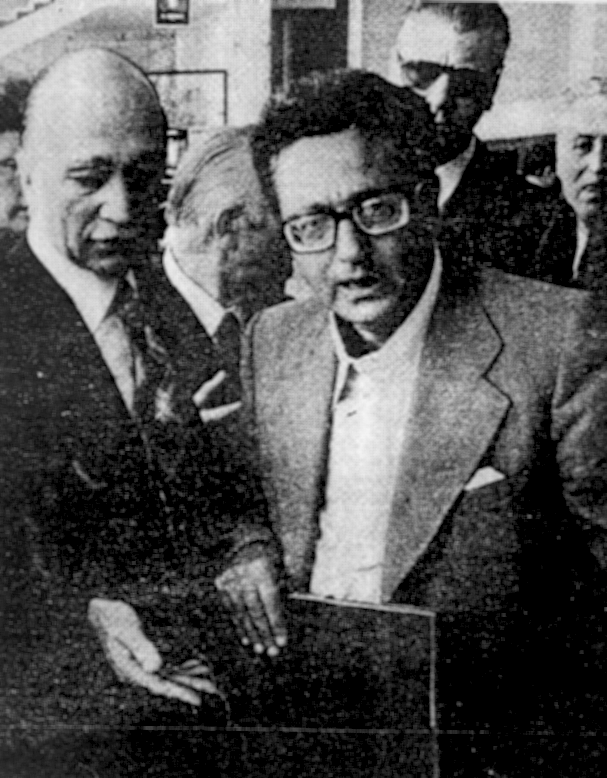
Rauti with Giorgio Almirante in 1969

Rauti returned to the MSI in 1969 and was given a seat on the Central Committee by Giorgio Almirante. Rauti's move was condemned by Clemente Graziani, who continued to lead a rump Ordine Nuovo outside the MSI although the two men actually remained close associates. Meanwhile, Rauti was elected to the Italian Chamber of Deputies in 1972.

Rauti's position within the MSI was strengthened in 1977 when the main moderate faction broke away to form a new party, National Democracy. This opened space for a new Evola-based movement to gain power within the party under Rauti and he placed his emphasis on youth by organising Camp Hobbit, a series of events for young party members that were noted for having a much more casual and fun-oriented vibe than previous party youth initiatives. The event was such a success that afterwards the MSI youth movement, the Fronte della Gioventù, threw their lot in with Rauti's faction. Meanwhile, his influence continued to grow when he became a leading figure in the European Parliament during the 1980s.

In 1987 Rauti, by then deputy-secretary of the MSI, was one of two candidates seeking to succeed Giorgio Almirante as leader of the MSI, the other being Gianfranco Fini. Continuing to present a policy platform based on the ideas of Evola, Rauti also demonstrated elements of Nouvelle Droite thinking, having been converted to ethnopluralism and support for nationalism in the developing world. Fini however, presenting a more moderate platform, secured the leadership by taking 727 votes to Rauti's 608.

== Leadership of MSI ==
Despite his defeat Rauti's position within the party was soon strengthened. Fini looked to the success of Jean-Marie Le Pen and the Front National in France and, seeking to utilise the template they had established, sought to make opposition to immigration the central policy of the MSI. The move provoked alarm as it seemed that Fini was seeking to abandon fascism altogether and instead turn the MSI to populism. This radical departure, combined with some poor electoral showings, led to Rauti replacing Fini as leader in 1990.

As leader Rauti sought to underline the party's fascism as being a radical revolutionary creed that, he argued, should not be considered right-wing. He also underlined his opposition to the United States and Western values as well as his support for ethnopluralism. However the 3.9% of the vote captured at the 1990 regional elections represented the worst return in MSI history and a further slump in support in local elections in Sicily saw him removed from the leadership in July 1991 and replaced by Fini.

== Fiamma Tricolore ==
Rauti remained a hard-line critic of Fini's leadership until 1995 when Fini declared the dissolution of the MSI and the foundation, in its place, of the Alleanza Nazionale. Seeing this a break from the fascist heritage which he felt was central to the MSI, Rauti led a group of militants to break away and form the Fiamma Tricolore, which he saw as continuing the path of fascism. Although commentators had expected the party to be a fringe movement it polled surprisingly well in the 1996 election and even managed to capture a seat in the European Parliament in the 1999 election.

== Retirement and comeback ==
Rauti stood down as leader in 2002 in favour of Luca Romagnoli, who immediately adopted a policy of seeking to work with Silvio Berlusconi's House of Freedoms coalition. Rauti became a strong critic of the direction taken by Romagnoli leading to him being expelled from the party he had founded in early 2004.

He then established his own party, the Social Idea Movement.

Rauti died in Rome, aged 85.

== Personal life ==
Besides his career in politics Rauti was also a noted journalist, joining the staff of the Rome-based daily Il Tempo in 1953. He would also act as one of the Italian correspondents for the Aginter Press.

His daughter Isabella, senator from Mantua, married Gianni Alemanno in 1992; Alemanno was Mayor of Rome for one term from 2008 to 2013; he was not re-elected into office.

== Electoral history ==
Election	House	Constituency	Party	Votes	Result
1972	Chamber of Deputies	Rome–Viterbo–Latina–Frosinone	MSI	100,240	Elected
1976	Chamber of Deputies	Rome–Viterbo–Latina–Frosinone	MSI	36,167	Elected
1979	Chamber of Deputies	Rome–Viterbo–Latina–Frosinone	MSI	43,975	Elected
1983	Chamber of Deputies	Rome–Viterbo–Latina–Frosinone	MSI	46,393	Elected
1987	Chamber of Deputies	Rome–Viterbo–Latina–Frosinone	MSI	36,237	Elected
1989	European Parliament	Central Italy	MSI	97,127	Elected
1994	European Parliament	Central Italy	AN	66,780	Elected

Source: Ministry of the Interior

== Published works ==
- Storia d'Italia nei discorsi di Mussolini, 1915-1945, (with Giuseppe Carlucci), 1966
- L'immane conflitto: Mussolini, Roosevelt, Stalin, Churchill, Hitler, 1967
- Le mani rosse sulle forze armate, (with Guido Giannettini), 1975
- Le idee che mossero il mondo, ed. Europa, 1980
- Benito Mussolini, ed. Europa, 1989
- Storia del fascismo (with Rutilio Sermonti), in 6 volumi:
  - 1 - Le interpretazioni e le origini, 2003, ed. Controcorrente
  - 2 - Dannunzianesimo, biennio rosso, marcia su Roma, 2004, ed. Controcorrente
  - 3 - La conquista del potere, 2009 ed. Controcorrente
  - 4 - Verso il governo, 1978, Centro editoriale nazionale
  - 5 - L'espansione e l'Asse, 1979, Centro editoriale nazionale
  - 6 - Nel grande conflitto, 1979, Centro editoriale nazionale
- Fascismo e Mezzogiorno, (with Rutilio Sermonti), ed. Europa, 1990

== See also ==
- Radical right (Europe)
