= Canonization of Thomas Aquinas =

Process of declaring Thomas Aquinas a saint

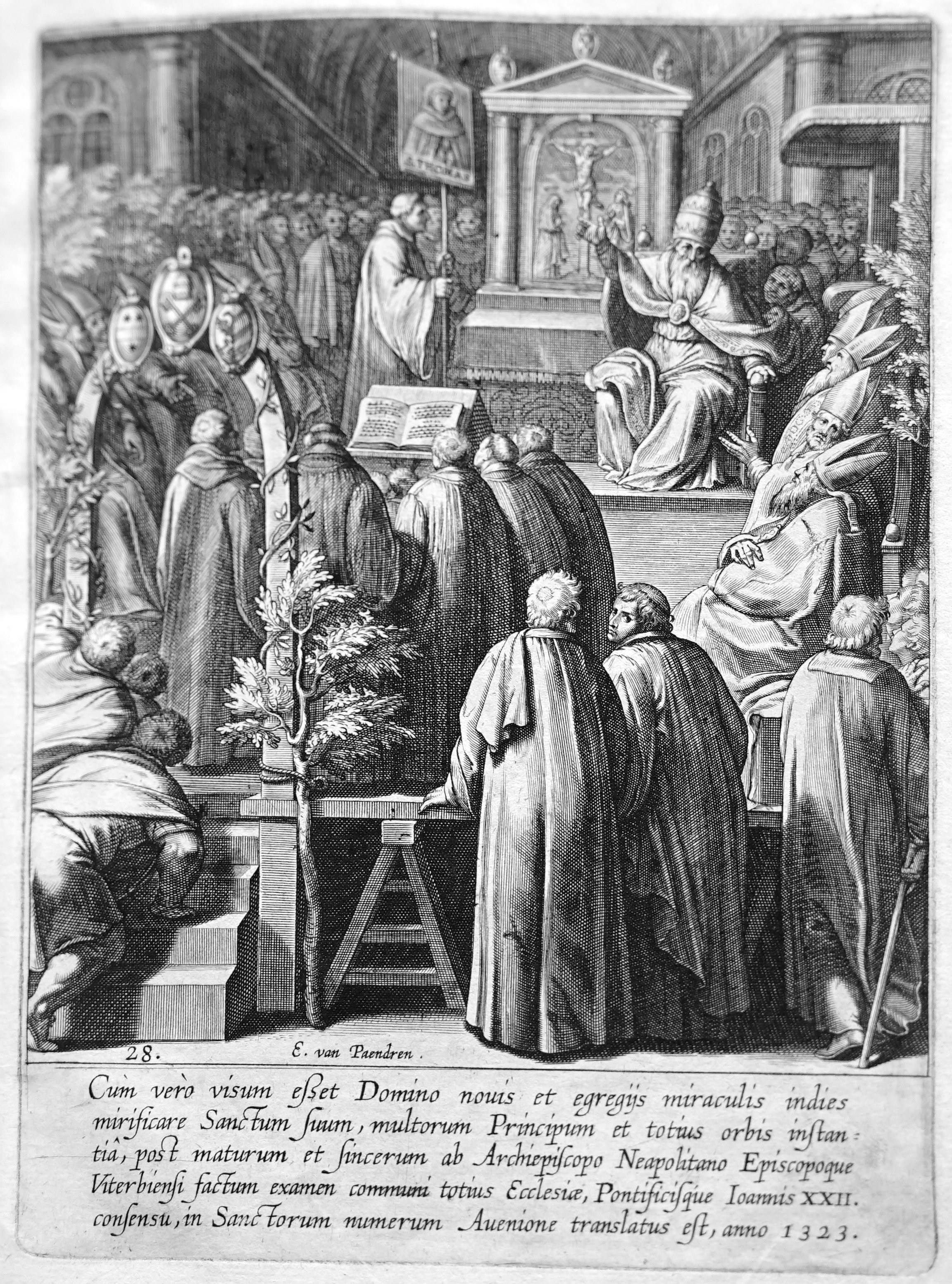
Engraving of the canonization of Thomas Aquinas by Egbert van Panderen and Otto van Veen (1610).

Following two inquiries which involved over a hundred eyewitnesses, the Italian Dominican theologian and philosopher Thomas Aquinas (1225–1274) was formally canonized as a saint of the Catholic Church on 18 July 1323 by Pope John XXII. His corpse was boiled and his remains were distributed as relics, the ownership of which was contested for decades. In 1324, he became the second most important saint in the Dominican Order, after Saint Dominic himself. In 1969, the feast day of Thomas was moved from 7 March to 28 January.

== Death ==
While en route to the Second Council of Lyon, Thomas Aquinas died on the morning of 7 March 1274 at the Cistercian abbey of Fossanova. His funeral, which was organized by the Cistercians, concluded hours later and he was buried in the monastery. Following the news of his death, devotees rushed to his tomb, where multiple miracles were reported.

According to Cistercian witnesses, Thomas had quoted Psalm 131:14 before entering Fossanova: "This is my rest for ever and ever; here I will dwell, for I have chosen it." The Cistercians interpreted this as proof of his belonging to the abbey. Anxious not to cede ownership of Thomas' body to the Dominicans, the Cistercians relocated it several times; in the process, Thomas' head was removed, while his right hand was cut off and given to one of his sisters, Theodora.

== Inquiries ==
In 1303, Bartholomaeus de Capua petitioned for Pope Benedict XI to initiate inquiries into Thomas' canonization, although the Pope died before any formal processes could begin. In 1317, the Sicilian Dominican vicar Robert of San Valention expressed interest in compiling a profile of Thomas' life and miracles which would be presented to Pope John XXII. Robert entrusted Guillelmo de Tocco and Robert the Lector with the task, which began in around November; by the following summer, the Dominicans had received an audience with the pope. After a formal presentation by the Dominicans and an examination of the evidence by a panel appointed by John XXII, the pope formally began the first inquiry into the canonization of Thomas Aquinas.

On 13 September 1318, the pope nominated the Archbishop of Naples, Umberto, the Bishop of Viterbo, Angelo, and a notary, Pandulpho de Sabbello as the commissioners of the inquiry. de Tocco continued working at Fossanova Abbey until 15 July 1319, although owing to the archbishop's old age and poor health, the actual inquiry was held at Umberto's residence in Naples. It commenced on 21 July 1319 and ended on 18 September 1319; de Sabbello―having been unable to travel to Naples―was absent throughout. The other two commissioners heard witness testimonies from 23 July until 16 August; among some 42 depositions, a soldier under Robert, King of Naples alleged that he regained mobility in his limbs after visiting the tomb of Thomas Aquinas, while a church elder claimed that his relative recovered "from the tumour in her throat" after hearing the tolling of the bell of Fossanova and praying to Thomas for healing. Other witnesses reported receiving visions of Thomas' last breath.

The transcript of the first inquiry was sealed and delivered to the pope, who then approved a second inquiry on 23 June 1321. de Sabbello remained on the commission and was joined by the Bishop of Anagni, Peter Ferri, and the Bishop of Terracina, Andrew. The second inquiry, which was held at Fossanova, lasted from 10 November to 27 November, during which over a hundred witnesses were called to testify. Thereafter, Guillelmo de Tocco is believed to have either died or fallen gravely ill, since he did not return to meet the pope and was replaced by John of Naples. In July 1323, more than two years after the second and last inquiry, the pope finally approved the canonization of Thomas Aquinas.

== Canonization and aftermath ==
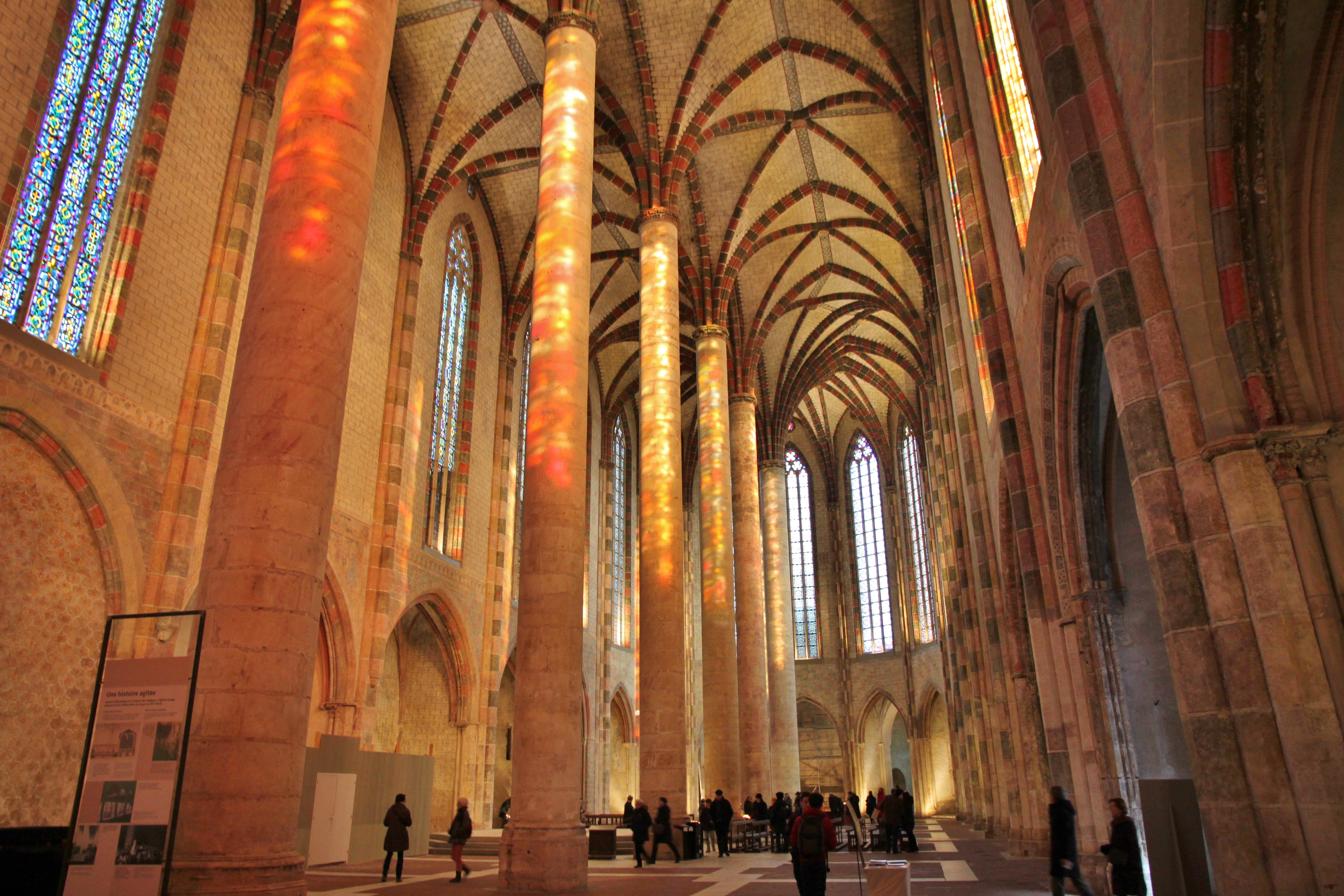
The remains of Thomas Aquinas are buried in the Church of the Jacobins in Toulouse.

The canonization of Thomas Aquinas was commemorated on two occasions. The first ceremony took place on 14 July 1323 at the Palais des Papes in Avignon and was attended by members of the royal family led by Robert, King of Naples, and his wife, Sancia of Majorca. The pope began a series of sermons praising Thomas. The second ceremony was held on 18 July 1323 at the Avignon Cathedral and was attended by the entire Avignon clergy alongside Robert and his wife. The pope began by preaching on Psalm 85; after the singing of "Veni Creator Spiritus", he formally announced the canonization of Thomas. The proceedings ended with the singing of "Te Deum", "In medio ecclesie", and "Os iusti". The day was celebrated "as if it were Christmas" all across Avignon, especially in Dominican churches. The canonization bull, published on the same day, declared that Thomas' feast day would be celebrated on 7 March.

The canonization was fiercely contested by the Franciscans, who rejected the doctrines of Thomas; according to tradition, a Franciscan friar stated that he "would prefer to die before seeing the day when Thomas was canonized" and remarkably died a day after the canonization. Following the canonization of Thomas Aquinas, his body was boiled, possibly in wine. Around this time, his head was transferred from Fossanova to the Church of San Benedetto in nearby Piperno (present-day Priverno), of which Thomas also became patron saint.

In 1324, the general chapter of the Dominican Order convened to discuss the veneration of Saint Thomas Aquinas. They agreed that he would be exalted as one of the greatest Dominican saints, surpassing Peter of Verona and placed just behind Saint Dominic in importance. Thomas' feast day was confirmed by the chapter in 1326, with the liturgy—one prayer and nine lections—finalized by 1328. In 1348, the count of Fondi, Onorato I Caetani, obtained the remains of Thomas Aquinas from the Cistercians.

In 1369, after close to a century of controversy, and at the behest of Pope Urban V, fifty of Thomas' bones were handed over to the French Dominicans in Toulouse. Thomas' head relic was also believed to have been translated to France, but another skull purportedly belonging to Thomas was discovered in Fossanova in 1585. Although initially housed at the Church of the Jacobins, the remains in Toulouse were moved to the Basilica of Saint-Sernin during the French Revolution in 1789; they only returned to the Church of the Jacobins in 1974. In 1969, Thomas' feast day was moved from 7 March, which often coincided with Lent, to 28 January, the date of his translation to France.
