= Barracks anarchists =

The Barracks anarchists (Italian: Anarchici della Baracca) were a group of five young adults who lost their lives in a car accident on the night of 26 September 1970, while they were on their way to Rome. They intended to deliver to their contacts denunciation material concerning the Gioia Tauro massacre, which took place on 22 July 1970, and the contextual events of the Reggio revolt.

The name derives from the Liberty villa, near Reggio Calabria, where young anarchists used to meet, the so-called "Baracca". The building was built as emergency accommodation after the 1908 Messina earthquake and became a meeting place for the Reggio alternative movement in the 1960s.

== Background ==
Gianni Aricò, his German fiancée Annelise Borth (known as "Muki"), Angelo Casile, Franco Scordo, Luigi Lo Celso, carried out documentation work on two events that took place in the summer of 1970 known as the Reggio revolt. They claimed that neo-fascists from Ordine Nuovo and Avanguardia Nazionale had infiltrated the events, with the aim of using it for subversive purposes. They also claimed that the derailment of the "Sun Train", on 22 July 1970 in Gioia Tauro, had been caused by an explosive charge planted by neo-fascists in collaboration with the 'Ndrangheta. The group began to carry out its own investigation, as part of a national debate within the Italian anarchist movement. They affiliated to the Italian Anarchist Federation (FAI) as the 'Bruno Misefari' group.

When they judged they had collected enough material they decided to travel to the capital to deliver them to the editorial office of Umanità Nova and meet the lawyer Di Giovanni, who had collaborated on the counter-investigation into the Piazza Fontana bombing. In particular, Gianni Aricò had told his mother that he had discovered things that "will make Italy tremble", referring to their "counter-intelligence" investigation on the Gioia Tauro bombing.

== Crash ==
The trip, planned to coincide with the arrival of US President Richard Nixon in Rome, and the protest demonstration called for 27 September, ended 58 km from Rome, between Ferentino and Frosinone, where their Mini was run over by a truck. Angelo Casile, Franco Scordo and Luigi Lo Celso died on impact and the other two went into a coma and died shortly afterwards.

On Tuesday 29 September 1970, the funerals of Angelo Casile, Francesco Scordo and Gianni Aricò took place in Reggio Calabria, while Lo Celso's funeral took place simultaneously in Cosenza.

"A tragic road accident has cut short the lives of the young anarchists Giovanni Aricò, Angelo Casile, Luigi Lo Celso and Francesco Scordo. We express our profound admiration and gratitude to these comrades who, animated by sublime ideals, dedicated their short lives tenaciously fighting against all forms of social injustice in a continuous yearning for freedom and love for the poor, the humble and the exploited".

On 28 January 1971, the Rome Public Prosecutor returned the investigation proceedings to the Frosinone Public Prosecutor's Office which, by decree of the investigating judge, dismissed the case as a motorway accident.

== Investigation ==
At the scene of the accident, the Polizia Stradale investigation established a probable mistake by the driver of the Mini, which led the car to crash into the back of a truck stopped in the emergency lane, with its lights off. The lorry with a trailer, registration number SA 135371, driven by Alfonso Aniello and owned by his brother Ruggero, was at the magistrate's arrival "in the normal lane, all the lights working except for those on the trailer, which were off even though the lights were not broken". Magistrate Fazzioli wrote:

"After the impact, a Mini Morris passenger car, registration plate RC 90181, was in the normal lane of travel, with the front end facing north, the front part of the said passenger car was completely destroyed, the roof uncovered. Approximately 20 metres from the passenger car was a lorry with trailer, said lorry was in the normal lane of travel (...); the trailer was affected by the collision for approximately half of the rear end, starting from the extreme left edge."

The two lorry drivers involved, according to counter-investigations carried out by anarchists, were employees of a company headed by Prince Junio Valerio Borghese, a well-known figure in the Italian far-right and the leader of an attempted coup a few months after the incident took place. Another of the coup's participants, Crescenzio Mezzina, lead the police investigation into the incident. In 1993, Giacomo Lauro and Carmine Dominici confirmed, to the Milan investigating judge Guido Salvini, the alleged collusion between far-right circles and the 'Ndrangheta and claimed the direct responsibility of the latter in the events of Reggio and in the Gioia Tauro bombing. Carmine Dominici told the judge that:

"I personally believe that the death of the five boys was not an accident but a murder. And this opinion is also shared by other avant-garde militants. I am absolutely unable to indicate who might have taken part in the alleged murderous action and, moreover, it was illogical to turn to Calabrian militants as this would have entailed a dangerous geographical displacement."

However, according to Aldo Giannuli's documentation Bombe ad inchiostro, which refers to documents from the Ministry of the Interior's Confidential Affairs Office:

"It is not true, for example, as written, that the two truck drivers who caused the accident, the brothers Serafino and Ruggiero Aniello, were employees of a far-right company; the two truck drivers, according to the papers of the UAAR (Confidential Affairs Office), were allegedly sympathisers of the PSDI and not of the National Front. Certainly these Aniello brothers were real highwaymen, since the truck they drove, number plate SA 135371, on 28 October 1970, caused a collision, on the outskirts of Milan, in which 8 people died and 40 were injured".

Mario Guarino attests that Angelo Casile had compiled a list of extremists in contact with the Greek junta that was also published by L'Espresso.

In 2001, new doubts were raised about the death of the five anarchists, and the head of the Calabrian Anti-Mafia Directorate Salvo Boemi defined the hypothesis that the incident had been a massacre as "logical and plausible":

"I am convinced that those five young people had found important documents. I cannot explain in any other way the disappearance of all the papers they were carrying in their hatchback. It is a case I would have liked to investigate [...] but there are insurmountable problems of competence."

== Bibliography ==
- Badolati, Arcangelo (2007). 'ndrangheta eversiva (in Italian). Cosenza: Klipper Edizioni. ISBN 978-88-88223-70-4.
- Caprara, Mario; Semprini, Gianluca (2011). Neri, la storia mai raccontata della destra radicale, eversiva e terrorista (in Italian). Rome: Edizioni tascabili Newton.
- Cuzzola, Fabio (2001). Cinque Anarchici del sud: Una storia negata (in Italian). Città del Sole edizioni.
- Guarino, Mario (2004). Poteri segreti e criminalità (in Italian). Bari: Edizioni Dedalo.
- Lucarelli, Carlo (2002). Misteri d'Italia: I casi di Blu notte (in Italian). Turin: Giulio Einaudi Editore. ISBN 88-06-15445-1.
- Posti, Nicoletta Orlandi (2013). Il sangue politico: Storia di cinque anarchici e di un dossier scomparso (in Italian). Rome: Editori Internazionali Riuniti.
- Raso, Agostino (2020). Rivolta fascista o di popolo? I partiti politici di fronte alla rivolta di Reggio e la strage di Gioia Tauro (in Italian). Reggio Calabria: Città del Sole edizioni. ISBN 978-88-8238-222-3.
- Ventura, N.; Barra, D. (2018). Maledetti '70: storie dimenticate degli anni di piombo (in Italian). ISBN 978-8885788053.
