= 1972 bombings in Italy =

The October 21–22, 1972 bombings in Italy were nine terrorist attacks that took place during the night. The target of the attacks were a number of trains headed to Reggio Calabria, bringing workers to the city for the protest march scheduled for the next day. The attack was part of a larger set of bombings perpetrated by neo-fascist terrorists belonging to the National Vanguard, linked to the Movimento Sociale Italiano party and Francesco Franco, leader of the revolt in Reggio Calabria sparked by the choice of Catanzaro as regional capital.

== Political situation ==
In July 1970, after the decision from the Italian Government to make Catanzaro regional capital of Calabria instead of Reggio Calabria a major protest strike begun in Reggio, led by both leftists and right-wing workers unions. After five days of rioting, the right-wing National Italian Workers' Union (CISNAL), led by Francesco Ciccio Franco, took the lead of the revolt, turning it to a full revolt against police forces and the formerly allied leftist unions, and became the informal leader of the rebel Action Committee and of the revolt. The Italian Communist Party (PCI), the main leftist party of the country, dissociated itself from the protest after it turned violent.

On July 22, 1970, a bomb exploded on "Treno del Sole", the Palermo-Turin train, in the Calabrian city of Gioia Tauro, killing 6 persons and wounding 136. The Gioia Tauro massacre was linked to the revolt. In 1993, a former member of the 'Ndrangheta (a Mafia-type criminal organisation based in Calabria), Giacomo Lauro, said he had supplied the explosives to people linked to the leaders of the revolt. On February 4, 1971, one was killed and 13 people were injured when three grenades were thrown into a crowd demonstrating outside the headquarters of the neo-fascist Italian Social Movement in Catanzaro. By their own admission, many of the urban-guerilla style actions during the revolt were coordinated and led by members of National Vanguard.

In February 1971, the revolt was suppressed. Prime minister Emilio Colombo offered to build the Fifth Steelwork Centre in Reggio including a railroad stump and the port in Gioia Tauro, an investment of 3 billion lire which would create 10,000 jobs, which softened the people of Reggio and helped to quell the revolt. The issue of Calabria's capital was resolved by a Solomonic decision: Catanzaro and Reggio Calabria became Calabria's joint regional capitals, Catanzaro as the seat of the regional administration and Reggio Calabria as the seat of the regional parliament.

The revolt ended up by being taken over by neo-fascists (relevant was also the role of the militant neo-fascist movement National Vanguard) and led to unexpected electoral fortunes for the Italian Social Movement at the Italian general election in May 1972, when Franco was elected senator. The neo-fascists benefitted, because the Christian Democrats were divided, and the PCI supported the suppression of the riots.

== Workers protest ==
The leftist unions led by the Italian General Confederation of Labour, who abandoned the revolt after the first five days due to violence and exploitation by the neo-fascists, set up a workers march in Reggio on October 22, 1972, named Conferenza del Mezzogiorno, in order to show the city that workers from the whole country were supporting their requests but rejecting the means of violence.

On a less evident level, the unions desire was to weaken the apparent influence of CISNAL and Francesco Franco, demonstrating that the majority of workers were with them. For the first time in Italian unions history, a major national rally was held in southern Italy. The industrial powerhouse of the country was in the north, while the political hub is in the center, so the southern part was usually underrepresented in the unionist action.

Twenty trains were chartered to bring workers from northern and central Italy, especially from the FIAT plant in Turin. One thousand shipbuilders from Genova Ansaldo shipyards booked a whole ship for their trip.

== Bombs ==
In order to impair the rally, right-wing terrorists placed bombs on the railway. The track in Cassino was bombed. Some trains were assaulted by people while crossing stations, some of them trying to join the protest, some trying to infiltrate the workers as agent provocateur. Taunts from some bystanders to the workers, as Roman salutes and insults, were a common occurrence during the trip.

In Priverno-Fossanova station, near Latina, a bomb blew up on a train coming from Bologna, causing only five injured. A new train was brought, and the workers continued their trip. A bomb was detonated on the stairs of the Palace of Justice of Latina. Two bombs exploded in Roccella Jonica, destroying two pylons of the telephone lines.

On the Rome–Reggio Calabria railway a bomb is detonated in the Valmontone station. After the explosion, police found another unexploded device at the entrance of the Palmi gallery. Between Lamezia Terme and San Pietro a Maida another bomb exploded damaging the railway track. Near Gioia Tauro, the town of the Freccia del Sud massacre, two explosive devices were found on the railway tracks.

Despite the bombings and the disruptions of rail service, over 40,000 people managed to reach Reggio Calabria. The unionist organizers were under great strain, fearing attacks or bombings on the march course, and were doubtful if marching was a sound thing to do after the attacks. Some workers begun the march autonomously, and were followed by the rest of the crowd. The parade received some stone throwing from provokers, but resisted responding to the violence. Ultimately, the protest became a strong message to the city and a great blow to Franco's power, effectively closing an age of turmoil in the city.

== Aftermath ==
According to the neo-fascist activist Vincenzo Vinciguerra, who at the time belonged to National Vanguard, the group had been responsible for the bombs. Senator Francesco Ciccio Franco was investigated for distributing leaflets hostile to the anti-fascist demonstration. Subsequent judicial investigations of charges of provocation and terrorism ended with his acquittal.

== In popular culture ==
Songwriter Giovanna Marini dedicated a song to the event, entitled "I treni per Reggio Calabria".
