= Francesco Franco =

Italian politician (1930–1991)

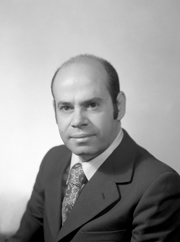
- Franco in 1972

Senator of the Republic of Italy
- In office June 6, 1968 – November 16, 1991
- Constituency: Calabria

Personal details
- Born: March 28, 1930 Reggio Calabria, Italy
- Died: November 16, 1991 (aged 61) Reggio Calabria, Italy
- Party: Italian Social Movement
- Occupation: Trade Unionist

Francesco Franco (Reggio Calabria, March 28, 1930 – Reggio Calabria, November 16, 1991), also known as Ciccio Franco, was an Italian politician, trade unionist and activist. He was a senator for the Italian Social Movement – National Right (Italian: Movimento Sociale Italiano – Destra Nazionale, MSI–DN) (1972–1991). He gained particular notoriety for his role as a popular leader during the Reggio revolt of 1970–1971.

== Reggio revolt ==
In July 1970, Franco, at the time a trade union leader from the National Italian Workers' Union (CISNAL) close to the neofascist movement, became the informal leader of the rebel Action Committee and of the revolt. The cause of the protests was a government decision to make Catanzaro, not Reggio Calabria, regional capital of Calabria.

On September 17, 1970, he was arrested along with other leaders of the revolt on charges of incitement in a police sweep that targeted some 100 people. The news about the arrest provoked violent reactions, in particular in the dilapidated Sbarre suburb in Reggio. At least 6,000 policemen were deployed from many parts of Italy to try to stop the violence. Franco was released on December 23, 1970.

On January 31, 1971, four leaders of the rebel Action Committee were arrested on charges for instigating violence. Franco was able to escape arrest initially, but was arrested on June 5, 1971, after a scuffle at a neo-fascist party rally in Rome. In February 1971, journalist Oriana Fallaci had been able to interview the fugitive Franco for L'Europeo. He explained that many potentially leftist youths "today are fascists simply because they believe that the battle of Reggio is interpreted fairly only by the fascists."

The revolt ended up by being taken over by neo-fascists (relevant was also the role of the militant neo-fascist movement National Vanguard) and led to unexpected electoral fortunes for the Italian Social Movement at the Italian general election in May 1972, when Franco was elected senator. The neo-fascists benefitted, because the Christian Democrats were divided, while the city was one of its fiefdoms, and the Italian Communist Party (PCI) supported the suppression of the riots.

== Senator ==
In 1972, Franco was investigated for distributing leaflets hostile to the anti-fascist demonstration organized by the left-wing trade unions in the city of Reggio Calabria on October 22, 1972. The night before the manifestation eight bombs exploded on trains to Reggio. Subsequent judicial investigations of charges of provocation and terrorism ended with his acquittal. He initially was convicted to four years but never served his sentence; the appeal never took place due to the expiration of the statute of limitations.

His models were South European leaders like Francisco Franco, António de Oliveira Salazar and those of the Greek junta, he told journalist Fallaci in 1971. He also denied the Holocaust: "Of course, it was not plain sailing for the Jews in the time of Hitler, but we must distinguish between Jews and the Jewish phenomenon, and the Jewish phenomenon I fight because it is an enrichment phenomenon to the detriment of those who are in pain and suffering".

Franco was re-elected for four subsequent terms, serving in the Senate from 1972 until his death in 1991, as a member of the Italian Social Movement. He died from a brain stroke on November 16, 1991, in his hometown Reggio Calabria.
