= Giovanni Roberti =

Italian politician (1909–2010)

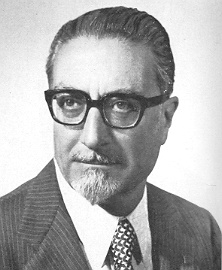
Giovanni Roberti

Giovanni Roberti (3 February 1909 – 18 January 2010) was an Italian politician.

== Biography ==
Giovanni Roberti was born in 1909 in Naples.

During the Second World War he was captured by the British and interned in the Hereford concentration camp (known as "Fascists' criminal camp") in Texas.

A Labor lawyer and professor of labor legislation at the University of Naples, he was co-founder and president from 1950 and secretary general from 1964 to 1977 of CISNAL, the union close to the positions of national syndicalism.

Roberti was elected in 1948 to the Chamber of Deputies in the constituency of Naples among the ranks of the Italian Social Movement and he sat uninterruptedly in Montecitorio from the first to the seventh parliamentary legislature (1976–1979). In 1977 he joined the National Democracy party. Since 1979, after the election defeat of National Democracy, he retired from politics.

In 1988 he published the volume "The right-wing opposition in Italy, 1946–1979".

He died on 18 January 2010, at the age of 100.
