= San Benedetto, Priverno =

Parish church in Priverno, Italy

Coordinates: 41°28′25.2″N 13°11′3.4″E

San Benedetto is an early Romanesque-style, Roman Catholic parish church located adjacent to the old city walls in Priverno, province of Latina, region of Lazio, central Italy. The church is dedicated to St Benedict of Nursia, and is the oldest church in the town.

== History ==
The ancient Roman town of Privernum was destroyed in the 700-800s, likely during Saracen raids. The town was rebuilt nearby, including this church. The structure was refurbished in the 13th century and the detached bell-tower was rebuilt in the 1780s after falling from a lightning strike. The nave has heavy pilasters and two entrances: one in the facade and one of the left flank. The stone structure is illuminated by high windows along the left side. The interior contains frescoes and icons dating back to 13th century, including a fragment of an Annunciation (circa 1430) by Pietro Coleberti.
