= Junio Valerio Borghese =

Italian Navy commander (1906–1974)

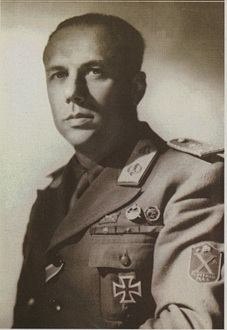

Honorary President of the Italian Social Movement
- In office 1951–1953
- Preceded by: none
- Succeeded by: Rodolfo Graziani

Personal details
- Born: Junio Valerio Scipione Ghezzo Marcantonio Maria Borghese; 6 June 1906 Rome, Lazio, Kingdom of Italy
- Died: 26 August 1974 (aged 68) Cádiz, Andalusia, Spain
- Resting place: Basilica di Santa Maria Maggiore
- Party: National Fascist Party (Note: Borghese was not affiliated to the Republican Fascist Party due to his noble origins, which were at odds with the principles of the party.) (1926–1943); Italian Social Movement (1946–1967); National Front (1968–1970)
- Height: 1.75 m (5 ft 9 in)
- Spouse: Darya Vasilyevna Olsufeeva (m. 1931; died 1963)
- Children: 4
- Education: Italian Naval Academy
- Profession: Military officer
- Awards: Gold Medal of Military Valour
- Nickname: The Black Prince

Military service
- Allegiance: Kingdom of Italy; Italian Social Republic
- Branch/service: Regia Marina; National Republican Navy
- Years of service: 1928–1945
- Rank: Frigate captain
- Unit: Decima Flottiglia MAS
- Commands: Decima Flottiglia MAS
- Battles/wars: Second Italo-Ethiopian War; Spanish Civil War; World War II: Mediterranean campaign; Raid on Alexandria; Italian campaign; Years of Lead: Golpe Borghese

Junio Valerio Scipione Ghezzo Marcantonio Maria Borghese (6 June 1906 – 26 August 1974), nicknamed The Black Prince, was an Italian Navy commander during the regime of Benito Mussolini's National Fascist Party and a prominent hardline neo-fascist politician in post-war Italy. In 1970, he took part in the planning of a neo-fascist coup, dubbed the Golpe Borghese, that was called off after the press discovered it; he subsequently fled to Spain and spent the last years of his life there.

== Early life and early career ==
Junio Valerio Borghese was born in Artena, Province of Rome, Kingdom of Italy. He was born into a prominent noble family of Sienese origin, the House of Borghese, of which Pope Paul V was a notable member. His father, Livio Borghese, was the 11th Prince of Sulmona and younger brother to the more famous Scipione Borghese. Borghese was the second son of the prince and, as such, had the title of Patrician of Rome, Naples and Venice and the style of Don Junio Valerio Borghese. However, the press and the English-language historiography routinely used the courtesy style Prince Junio Valerio Borghese. Borghese was first educated in London, England, and, from 1923, he attended the Royal Italian Navy Academy (Accademia Navale) in Livorno.

In 1929, the naval career of Borghese began. By 1933, he was a submarine commander. Borghese took part in the Second Italo-Abyssinian War. During the Italian intervention in the Spanish Civil War, he was in command of the submarine Iride, where he allegedly lost two seamen after his unit was depth-charged by the British destroyer HMS Havock.

== World War II ==
The elite World War II Italian naval unit Decima Flottiglia MAS is considered by many to be the first modern naval commando squad. Assembled by Prince Junio Valerio Borghese at the beginning of the war, these "frogmen" were trained to fight undercover and underwater with small submarines and assault boats armed with a variety of torpedoes—pioneering tactics that remain a standard for Special Forces around the world today.

At the start of the Second World War, Borghese took command of submarine Vettor Pisani, and in August 1940 was in command of submarine Sciré, which was modified to carry the new secret Italian weapon, the human torpedo. Known as "slow speed torpedoes" (siluri a lenta corsa, or SLC), and nicknamed "pigs" (maiali) for their poor maneuverability, these were small underwater assault vehicles with a crew of two.

These were part of the 1ª Flottiglia Mezzi d'Assalto (MAS), the "First Assault Vehicle Flotilla" (later called Decima Flottiglia MAS), an elite naval sabotage unit of the Royal Italian Navy (Regia Marina Italiana).

As commander of Sciré Borghese took part in several raids using SLC. The first of these, in September and October 1940, were directed at Gibraltar. The September raid was abandoned when the harbour was found to be empty. In the October raid, Borghese took Sciré deep into Gibraltar Bay, making a difficult submerged passage in order to release the SLC as close to the target as possible. For this he received the Medaglia d'Oro al Valor Militare (MOVM), despite the mission's overall lack of success.

In May 1941 a further attempt ended in failure, but on 20 September 1941, a successful mission damaged three merchant ships in the harbour. After this last attack, he was promoted to Capitano di Fregata, and named commander of the Decima MAS' sub-surface unit.

On 18 December 1941, he reached Alexandria in Sciré and launched the daring raid by three SLCs that heavily damaged the two Royal Navy battleships HMS Valiant and HMS Queen Elizabeth and two other ships in the harbour. The six Italian Navy crew that attacked Alexandria harbour all received the Medaglia d'Oro al Valor Militare, and Borghese was named Cavaliere dell'Ordine Militare di Savoia.

In May 1943, Borghese took command of the Decima Flottiglia MAS ("10th Assault Vehicle Flotilla"), or Xª MAS with Roman numerals, which continued active service in the Mediterranean and pioneered new techniques of commando assault warfare. The Roman numeral was in memory of Caesar's famous Decima Legio.

=== 8 September 1943: the Armistice ===
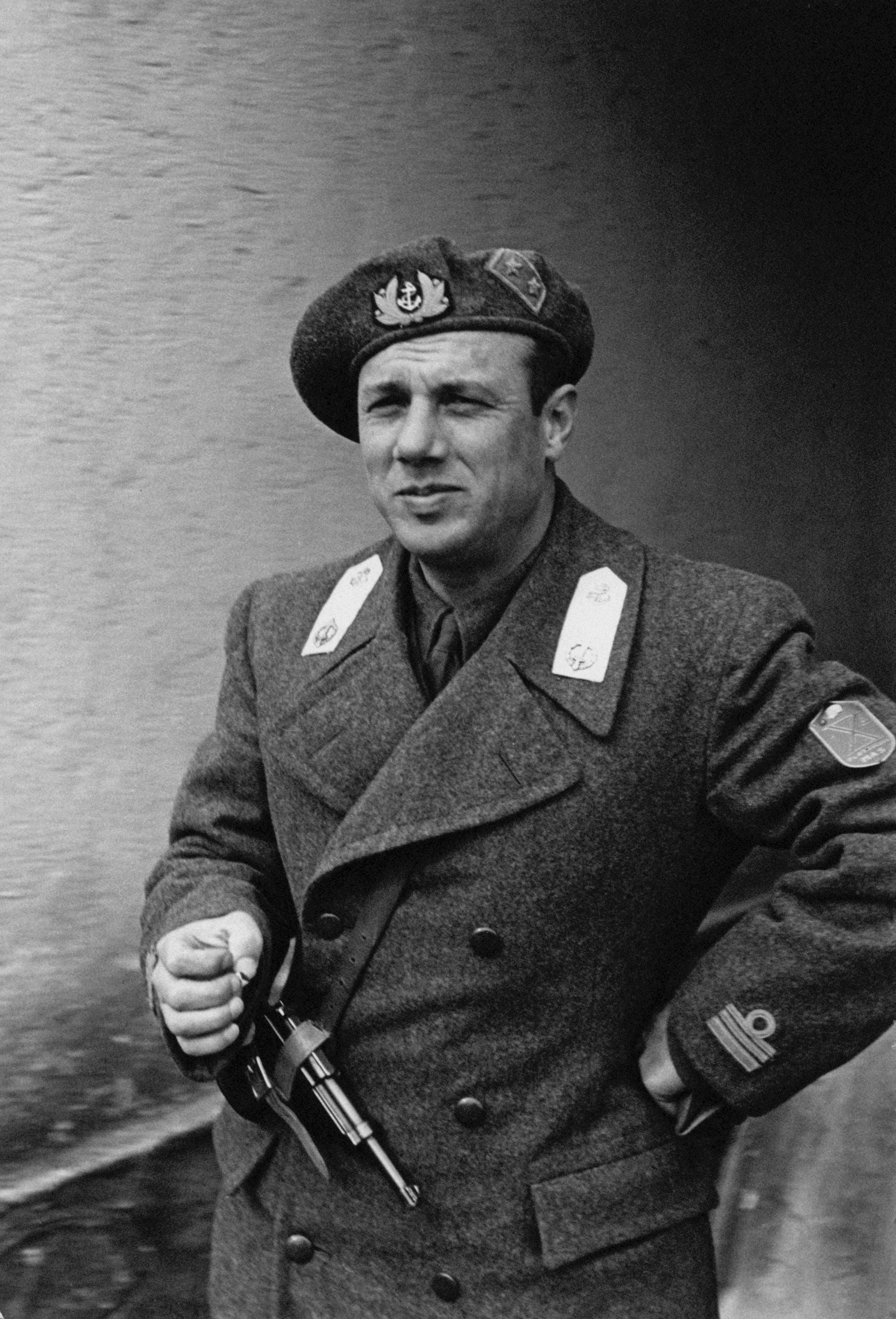
Borghese in 1944

After Italy's surrender to the Allies on 8 September 1943, the Xª MAS was disbanded. While some of its sailors joined the Allies, Borghese chose to continue fighting with the Italian Social Republic (RSI) alongside the German Armed Forces (Wehrmacht).

On 12 September 1943, he signed a treaty of alliance with Nazi Germany's Kriegsmarine. Many of his colleagues volunteered to serve with him, and the Decima Flottiglia was revived, headquartered in Caserma del Muggiano, La Spezia. By the end of the war, it had over 18,000 members, and Borghese conceived it as a purely military unit. The X Flottiglia gained a reputation for never firing a shot at any Italian military units fighting with the Allied forces.

In April 1945 when the US command discovered that the British had granted permission to Marshal Josip Broz Tito of Yugoslavia, and his Communist troops, to occupy northeastern Italy from Venice to the east, Borghese moved the bulk of the X Flottiglia from the Ligurian and Piedmontese area to the Veneto. The X Flottiglia built a line of defence on the Tagliamento river where they resisted until the arrival of the Allied troops.

In this action, the X Flottiglia lost over eighty per cent of the fighting sailors dispatched to the front against Tito's troops, and the Italian Communist Partisans allied with Tito.

At the end of the war, Borghese was rescued by Office of Strategic Services officer James Angleton, who dressed him in an American uniform and drove him from Milan to Rome for interrogation by the Allies. Borghese was then tried and convicted of collaboration with the Nazi invaders, but not of war crimes, by the Italian Court. He was "sentenced to 12 years imprisonment, discounted to 3 years, due to his glorious expeditions during the war, his defence of northeast borders against Tito's IX Corps and his defence of Genoa harbour". He was released from jail after four years' imprisonment by the Supreme Court of Cassation in 1949.

== Political activism after the war ==
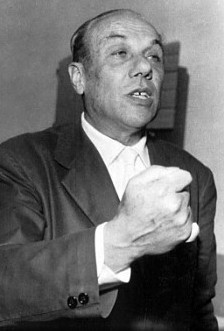
Borghese in 1970

With his record as a war hero and his support of Fascism, he became a figurehead for pro-fascist, anti-communist groups in the immediate post-war period, acquiring the nickname Black Prince.

Borghese wrote a supportive introduction, affirming his political ideology of an idealistic neo-fascist new aristocracy meritocratically based purely on character, to far right revolutionary-conservative theorist Julius Evola's book Men Among the Ruins. He later wrote a memoir of his wartime exploits, published as Sea Devils in 1954. He was associated with the Movimento Sociale Italiano (MSI), the neo-fascist party formed in the post-World War II period by former supporters of the dictator Benito Mussolini.

Later, advocating a harder line which the MSI was not able or willing to uphold, he broke from the MSI to form an even stauncher neofascist formation, known as the Fronte Nazionale.

=== Attempted coup ===
Following a last minute aborted coup d'état plot which fizzled out on the night of 8 December 1970 (the Feast of the Immaculate Conception), referred to as the Golpe Borghese, he was forced to cross the border to avoid arrest and interrogation. In 1984, ten years after Borghese's death, the Supreme Court of Cassation ruled that no coup d'état attempt had happened, in the sense that it was just a "meeting of four or five sixty-year-olds".

Nevertheless, the attempt is well known in Italy and film director Mario Monicelli made a biting satire of it called Vogliamo i colonnelli (1972) (We want the Colonels, as the Fascist Greek colonels were pulling the strings behind the scenes). The main character (played by Ugo Tognazzi) is a bombastic neo-fascist politician called Tritoni (Triton), a clear allusion to Borghese, who was sometimes called the frog prince in Italy, after his time in the Frogmen assault Unit Dècima MAS.

=== Final years and death ===
Latterly regarded as a political outcast and shunned by his ancestrally blue blood social connections for his "heretical" political extremism and disregard for the external norms of modern aristocratic etiquette and behaviour, Borghese died under mysterious circumstances in Cádiz, Spain, on 26 August 1974, aged 68. The death certificate records the cause of death as "acute hemorrhagic pancreatitis"; however, since Borghese was visited by a physician who found him in good shape just a few days before, it has been suggested that the circumstances of his death, characterized by a sudden onset of abdominal pain immediately after supper, could be compatible with arsenic poisoning.

He is buried in the Borghese family chapel in the Basilica di Santa Maria Maggiore, Rome.

== Family ==
He was born as Junio Valerio Scipione Ghezzo Marcantonio Maria of the Borghese princes in Rome, in one of the most important families of the Roman nobility, of ancient Sienese origins, with 4 cardinals, a pope and Napoleon Bonaparte's sister, Paolina, among his ancestors. He was the second son of Prince Livio Borghese of Sulmona (1874–1939), Prince of Rossano, Prince of Vivaro Romano, Prince of Monte Compatri, Duke of Palombara, Duke of Poggio Nativo and Castelchiodato; his mother was Princess Valeria Maria Alessandra Keun (Smyrna, 1880 – Catania, 1956), daughter of Alfred August Keun and Virgina Amirà. His parents separated in Rome on 31 May 1911. As a consequence of the fact that his father was a diplomat (with the rank of plenipotentiary minister), Junio Valerio spent the first years of his life travelling between Italy and the main foreign capitals, staying in China, Egypt, Spain, France and Great Britain. In Italy, he mostly spent his time in and around Rome. He married in Florence, on 30 September 1931, the Russian countess Darya Vasilyevna Olsufeeva (Moscow, 1909 – Rome, 1963), sister of Alexandra "Assia" Vasilyevna Olsufeeva, wife of Andrea Busiri Vici. They had four children:

- Elena Maria Nives (Rome, 1932 – Paris, 2004);
- Paolo Valerio Livio Vasilj Michele Scipione Romano Maria (Rome, 1933 – Rome, 1999), who married Niké Arrighi, with whom he had his daughter Flavia;
- Livio Giuseppe Maria della Neve (Rome, 1940 – Sperlonga, 1989), who married Piera Loreta Rita Vallone (1941), with whom he had: Daria (1968), who married Carmelo Tibor Salleo of the Barons of San Filippo, Livia, Marcantonio (Rome, 1970), who married Francesca d'Amore and Niccolò;
- Andrea Scirè Maria della Neve [78] (Rome, 1942 - Wollongong, 2024), who married Marisa Canti, with whom he had: Luca, Alessio (twins), Karen and Valerio.

== Published works ==
- Junio Valerio Borghese (1954). Sea Devils. Chicago: Henry Regnery Company.
- Junio Valerio Borghese (1950). Decima Flottiglia MAS. Milano: Garzanti.
