= National Front (Italy, 1967) =

National Front Fronte Nazionale
- Leader: Junio Valerio Borghese
- Founded: 1967; 59 years ago
- Dissolved: 1970; 56 years ago
- Split from: Italian Social Movement
- Paramilitary wing: Avanguardia Nazionale
- Ideology: Neo-fascism
- Political position: Far-right
- Colours: Black

The National Front (Fronte Nazionale, FN) was a neo-fascist political party in Italy.

The party was founded in 1967 by Junio Valerio Borghese who was dissatisfied by the political activities of the Italian Social Movement, of which he had held the largely ceremonial post of party President.

The new party aimed to abolish political parties and trade unions and instead to build an Italy based on corporatism, class co-operation and strong government in opposition to what they called "red terror". The Front drew many of its members from amongst the officer class and veterans thereof, groups with which Borghese was already closely linked, and co-operated closely with the Stefano Delle Chiaie's Avanguardia Nazionale and Pino Rauti's Ordine Nuovo, even sharing members with both groups. With a nationwide structure and a network of funding from business sources the Front soon had a few thousand members and even set up underground "B groups" to prepare the ground for an armed uprising.

The Front's mission was fulfilled in the Golpe Borghese, a failed coup attempt launched in December 1970, with the group disappearing soon afterwards. Like its close cousin in the National Vanguard, the party was alleged to have been promoting terrorism and to have been infiltrated by the Italian intelligence agencies. These agencies used it as a recruiting ground for expendable pawns to be used in 'wet' and 'dirty' operations which would have been outside their jurisdiction or supposed ethics (see strategy of tension).
