= Priverno =

- Comune
- Comune di Priverno
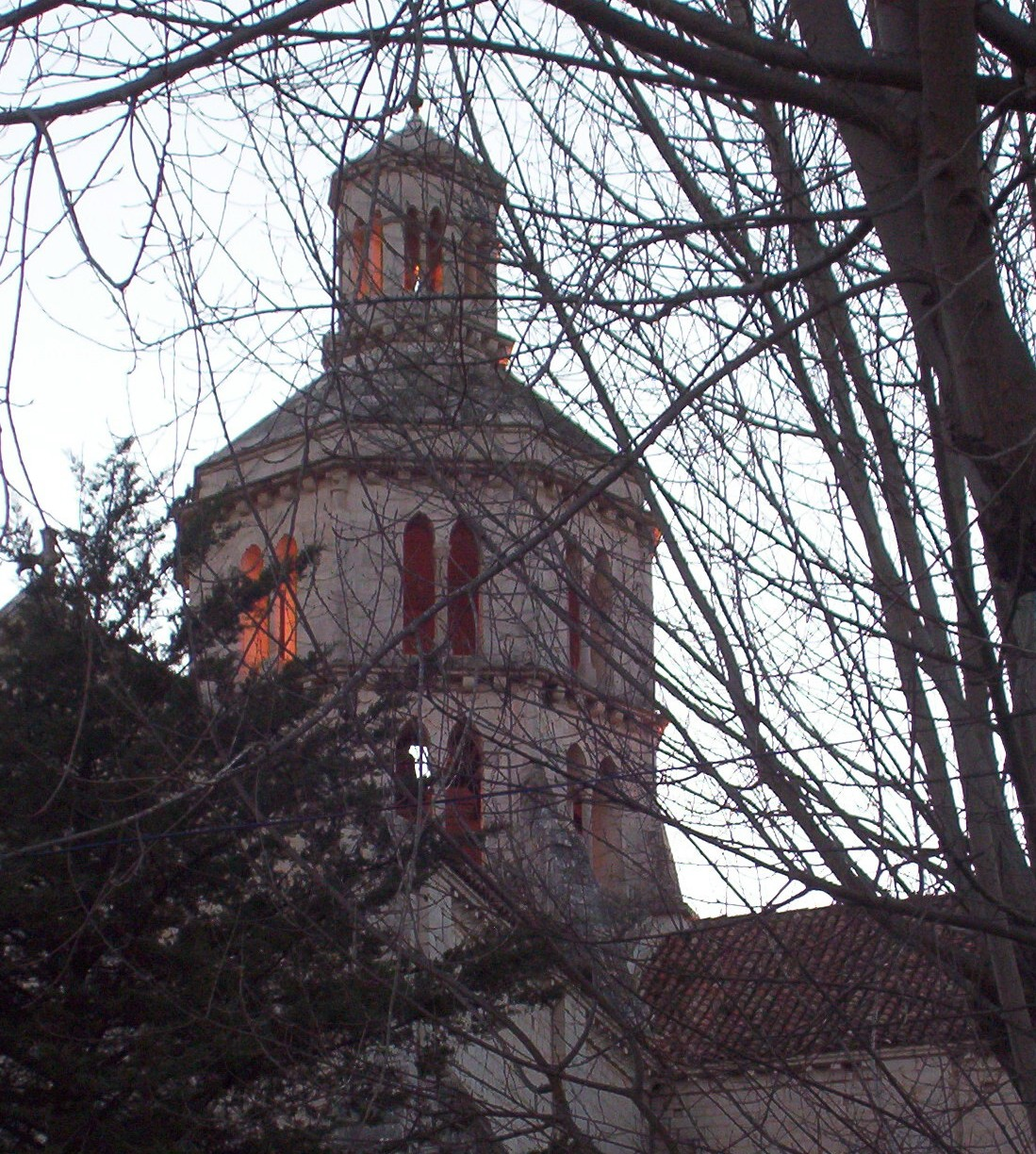
- View of Fossanova Abbey

- Coat of arms

- Location within Italy Location within Lazio
- Coordinates: 41°28′N 13°11′E
- Country: Italy
- Region: Lazio
- Province: Latina (LT)
- Frazioni: Boschetto, Casale, Case Alloggio Ferrovieri, Ceriara, Colle Rotondo, Colle San Pietro, Colle Sughereto, Fascia, Fornillo, Fossanova, Gricilli, Le Crete, Maccalè, Mezzagosto, Montalcide, Osteria dei Pignatari, Perazzette, Pruneto, San Martino, Stazione Fossanova, Stradone Grotte

Government
  - Mayor: Anna Maria Bilancia (Civic list)

Area
  - Total: 56.98 km^{2} (22.00 sq mi)
- Elevation: 151 m (495 ft)

Population (31 May 2022)
  - Total: 13,668
  - Density: 239.9/km^{2} (621.3/sq mi)
- Demonym: Privernati or Pipernesi
- Time zone: UTC+1 (CET)
  - Summer (DST): UTC+2 (CEST)
- Postal code: 04015
- Dialing code: 0773
- Patron saint: St. Thomas Aquinas
- Saint day: March 7
- Website: Official website

Priverno (Latin: Privernum) is a town, comune in the province of Latina, Lazio, central Italy. It was called Piperno until 1927.

It has a station of the Rome-Naples railway mainline. Nearby is the Monti Lepini chain. It was the birthplace of the canonist Reginald of Piperno.

== History ==
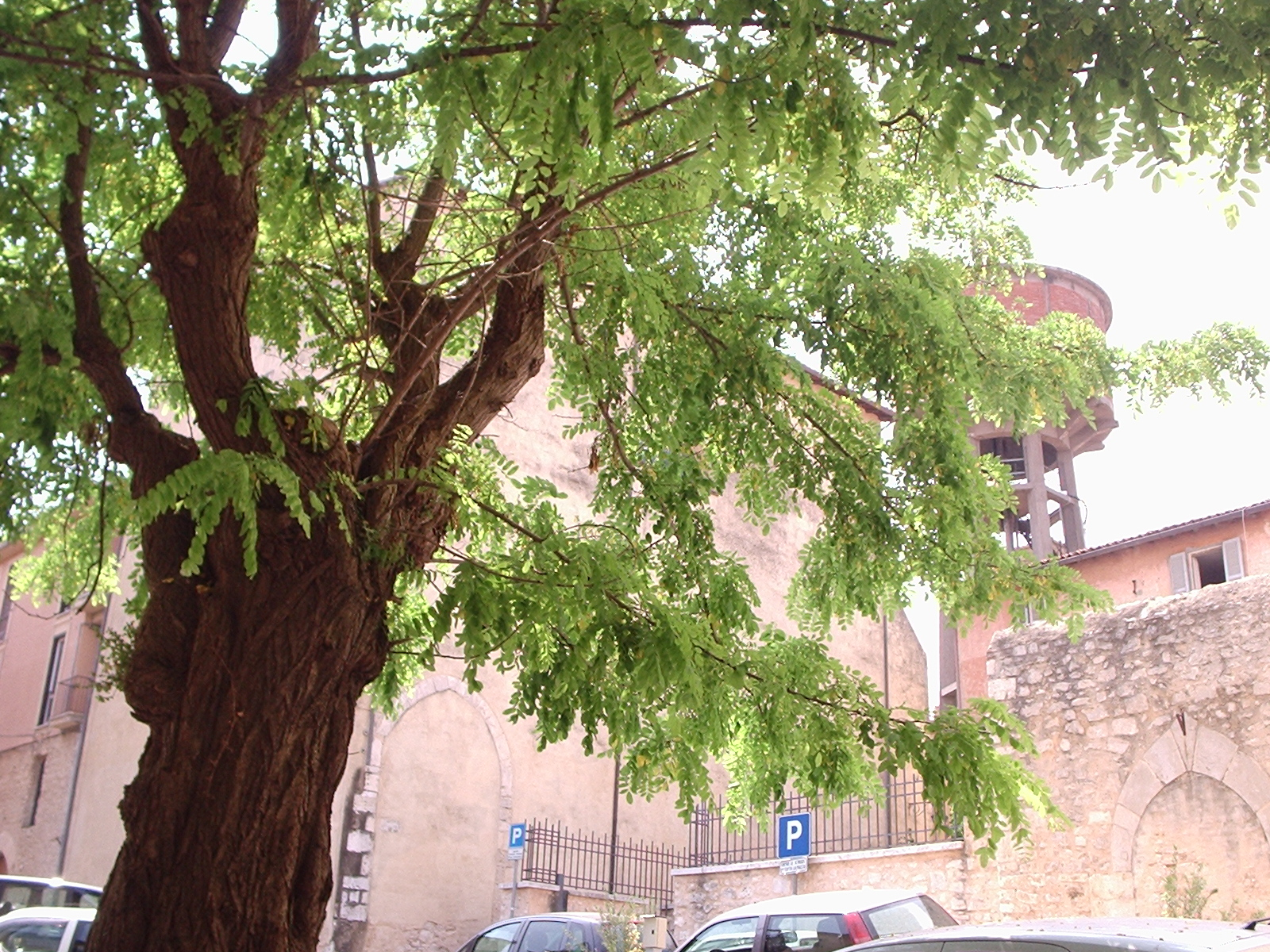
Robinia pseudoacacia in Priverno summer city

Privernum is described by Livy as a flourishing Volscian site, which was conquered and destroyed by the Romans in the late 4th century BC. The Appian Way passed nearby. The town recovered under the Roman rule, but disappeared after the fall of the Western Roman Empire, probably destroyed by Saracen attacks.

Researchers studying the concrete used in Privernum concluded that the use of quicklime made ancient Roman concrete more durable than its modern counterpart.

It was later a minor center of the Papal States, to which it belonged until the capture of Rome in 1870.

== Main sights ==
Nearby is the Abbey of Fossanova, which is where the town's patron saint, St. Thomas Aquinas died on 7 March 1274.

Other churches include:

- Santa Maria Assunta (former Cathedral), consecrated by Pope Lucius II in 1183. It houses a panel of the Madonna d'Agosto and St. Thomas's skull.
- San Benedetto, built by the Benedictines from the 7th century AD; it includes 13th and 16th centuries frescoes
- San Giovanni Evangelista (c. 9th century, rebuilt in the 13th century). It has 13th-15th century frescoes, including stories of St. Catherine (14th century), a Madonna with Child (15th century)
- San Tommaso d'Aquino (13th century)
- San Nicola (13th century)

Lay buildings include the Villa Gallio, a residence of Cardinal Bartolomeo Gallio, the Communal Palace (13th century), with the Dolphin Fountain by Giuseppe Olivieri and the Porta San Marco and Porta Posterola, the only remains of the seven gates once giving access to Priverno. Remains of the old Privernum are outside the town, including parts of the walls, baths, three patrician houses and a temple. Here a colossal statue of Tiberius (now in the Vatican Museum) was found in the late 18th century.

== Notable people ==
- Alice Urciuolo (born 1994), screenwriter and author
