= General Labour Union (Italy) =

UGL
- General Labour Union
- Unione Generale del Lavoro
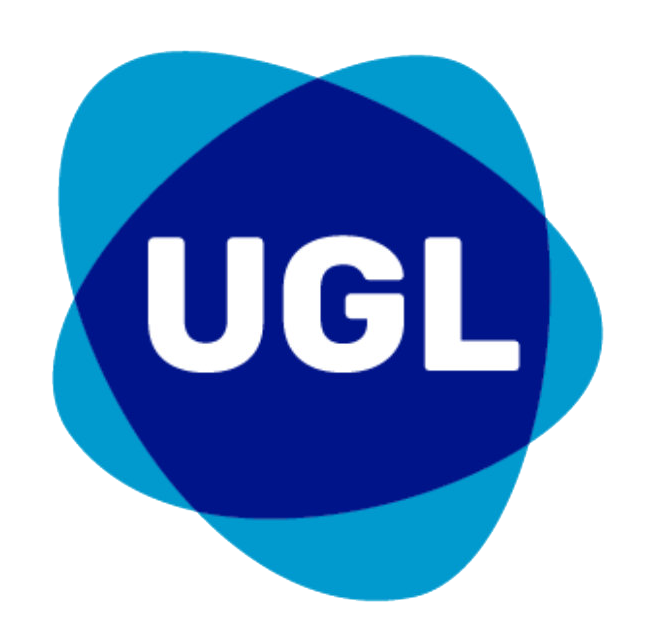
- Founded: 1950
- Headquarters: Rome, Italy
- Location: Italy
- Members: 1.956.000
- Key people: Francesco Paolo Capone, general secretary;
- Website: www.ugl.it

The General Labour Union (Italian: Unione Generale del Lavoro) is an Italian Trade Union Confederation established in 1950, with the original denomination Confederazione Italiana Sindacati Nazionali Lavoratori (CISNAL). In 1996, CISNAL assumed its current name of General Labour Union (Italian: Unione Generale del Lavoro), a symbolic change to respond to the new challenges of third-millennium society and the reforms of work legislation, without forgetting the founders’ values.

The UGL, which has about 2 million members, has a close collaboration with the League of Matteo Salvini. Currently, the Deputy Minister of Labor of the Lega - 5 Stelle government is Claudio Durigon, former Deputy Secretary-General of UGL. At the enterprise level, UGL develops the Trade Union action to defend employees’ rights. In the framework of Italian industrial relations, it concurs to the realization of collective labor agreements.

UGL representatives seek to influence social legislation and policies, in the consultation process with the Public Authorities and the other Social Partners. UGL has its delegates as members of Italian and European institutions that gather civil society as CNEL and EESC. On September 15, 2020, UGL and Assodelivery, the Italian association which groups the workers of Deliveroo, Glovo, Uber Eats, Just Eat e Social Food, have signed the first European collective agreement for the so-called riders belonging to the food/beverage economic sector.

== Values and aims ==
During the First Republic, CISNAL was described as neo-fascist and as close to the Italian Social Movement.

UGL, considering fundamental the centrality and the dignity of the human being, identifies in the Trade Union action a pillar for the improvement of social justice. UGL aims to sustainable economic development in modern society, in a vision that considers the ultimate objective of the overall national interest. UGL has a vision known at the international level as the so-called “conservative socialism” or “third position” (in Italian known as “social right-wing”), which aims to a synthesis between right-wing cultural views and left-wing economic views. To achieve this aim UGL proposes: • To overcome the ideological concept of social class and the consequent class conflict • To promote employees participation in the companies • To fight all the discriminations in the workplaces • To support the unity in the world of work

UGL considers that the achievement of an efficient social dialogue at Italian, European and World-wide levels, could represent a great resource to guarantee the workers’ rights, besides being an indispensable instrument able to contrast the worst consequences of globalization.

== Structures ==
UGL is articulated in two different kinds of structures:

− Territorial Structures at a regional and provincial level, with 20 Regional Offices (URL), correspondent to the twenty Italian Regions, and Provincial Offices (UTL) for every Italian province

− Professional Federations for each working sector. Moreover it provides the following services: social assistance, fiscal assistance, professional training, agrarian training, housing assistance, promotion of culture and tourism, international cooperation.

The communication activities of UGL are realized by the publication of texts and documents, the Confederation’s newspaper The Social Goal (Italian:“La Meta Sociale”) with a daily edition.

== General Secretaries ==
Years	Name	Party
1950–1964	Giuseppe Landi	MSI
1964–1977	Giovanni Roberti	MSI
1977–1990	Ivo Laghi	DN / MSI
1990–1991	Fedele Pampo	MSI
1991–1992	Corrado Mannucci	
1992–1999	Mauro Nobilia	MSI / AN
1999–2006	Stefano Cetica	AN
2006–2010	Renata Polverini	PdL
2010–2014	Giovanni Centrella	Ind.
2014	Geremia Mancini	Ind.
2014–	Francesco Paolo Capone	Ind.

== Related items ==
- Confederazione Italiana dei Lavoratori
- Movimento operaio
- CGIL
- UIL
- UGL
- Cobas
- CUB
- USB
- Unione Sindacale Italiana
- UILCEM
- Unione italiana lavoratori del tessile, energia e chimica
