= Paolo Signorelli (politician) =

Italian politician (1934–2010)

Personal details
- Born: 14 March 1934 Rome, Italy
- Died: 1 December 2010 (aged 76) Rome, Italy
- Party: MSI; ON; FN
- Spouse: Claudia
- Children: Luca Signorelli; Silvia Signorelli
- Occupation: Author, activist, politician

Paolo Signorelli (14 March 1934 – 1 December 2010) was an Italian author, activist, and politician of the extreme right.

== Early life and education ==
Signorelli was born in Rome on 14 March 1934. His mother was from Ciociaria. His father, born in Viterbo, had served in World War I, getting seriously injured in the 1916 battle at Isonzo and coming home as an invalid.

Signorelli finished high school at the Liceo Augusto in Rome and went on to graduate from the Sapienza University of Rome with a Ph.D. in Political Science. His thesis was about revolutionary syndicalism.

== Activism ==
Signorelli became politically active from a young age, already sympathetic to the cause and the veterans of the Italian Social Republic, and started getting into brawls with leftist fellow students. As a 14-year old, he enlisted in the RGSL (Raggruppamento giovanile studenti e lavoratori, "Regrouping of young students and workers") of the Italian Social Movement (MSI; Movimento Sociale Italiano). (Note: The RGSL was established in 1947 by the MSI. In September 1971, it merged along with Giovane Italia ("Young Italy") into the Fronte della Gioventù ("Youth Front"). See De Troia (2001).) In the year 1950, he worked for the "traditionalist" magazine Imperium that was publishing works by Julius Evola, (Note: The magazine Imperium began its run in January 1950 and ended it in December of the same year after most members of the editorial board, such as Rauti, De Perini, Lucci, Chiarissi, and others were arrested, accused of being members of a new FAR (Fasci di Azione Rivoluzionaria, "Fasces of Revolutionary Action"). See Marilotti (2020).) "the leading philosopher of Europe's neofascist movement."

As a student, he commanded Caravella, the branch of MSI's student organization FUAN (Fronte universitario d'azione nazionale) inside Sapienza University. After his graduation, he started working at the De Sanctis classical high school in the capital, teaching history and philosophy.

In the 1950s, he came into contact with prominent figures of the Italian extra-parliamentary right such as Clemente "Lello" Graziani, who went on to found in 1956 the "New Order Scholarship Center" (Centro Studi Ordine Nuovo), and of the MSI leadership such as Giorgio Almirante, Augusto De Marsanich, and Arturo Michelini. In 1956, he joined in the violent confrontations in the streets of Rome between young nationalists who were protesting against the Soviet invasion of Hungary and leftist unions, such as the union of printers, who had come out in support of the "Soviet Union's intervention against the counter-revolutionaries in Budapest."

In 1957, proclaiming that the party had lost "all revolutionary aspirations," Signorelli left the MSI together with Pino Rauti, Clemente Graziani, Giulio Maceratini, Stefano Delle Chiaie, Rutilio Sermonti, Adriano Romualdi and others who were also opposing the "moderate line" advocated by the leadership of Arturo Michelini. In 1969, Signorelli, along with others, such as Rauti, rejoined the MSI. In 1976, he was expelled from the Movimento and went on to participate in the establishment of Lotta di Popolo ("Struggle of the People"), a movement that ostensibly rejected "dogmatic ideological references" and aimed to "re-evaluate" the ideas of prominent left-wing revolutionaries such as Mao Zedong and Ernesto Guevara in the name of establishing a common front opposing "imperialism, capitalism, and Zionism."

== Armed militancy ==
In the 1970s, the Almirante leadership of MSI was aiming at the establishment of a destra nazionale ("national Right") front. Young militants in Rome, led by secretary Teodoro Buontempo and deputy secretary Paolo Sgrò, expressed "impatience" with what they perceived as Almirante's "moderate choice." In 1975, Signorelli and Buontempo formed the Lotta Popolare ("Popular Struggle") faction that took hold in about fifteen MSI sections, bringing together those who, like Buontempo, wanted an initiative towards more active militancy but had no intention to break with party strategies and discipline, and those who, instead, like Signorelli, wanted a "strategic contrast" between the militant "struggle of the people" and the political "national Right".

=== Bologna train-station bombing ===
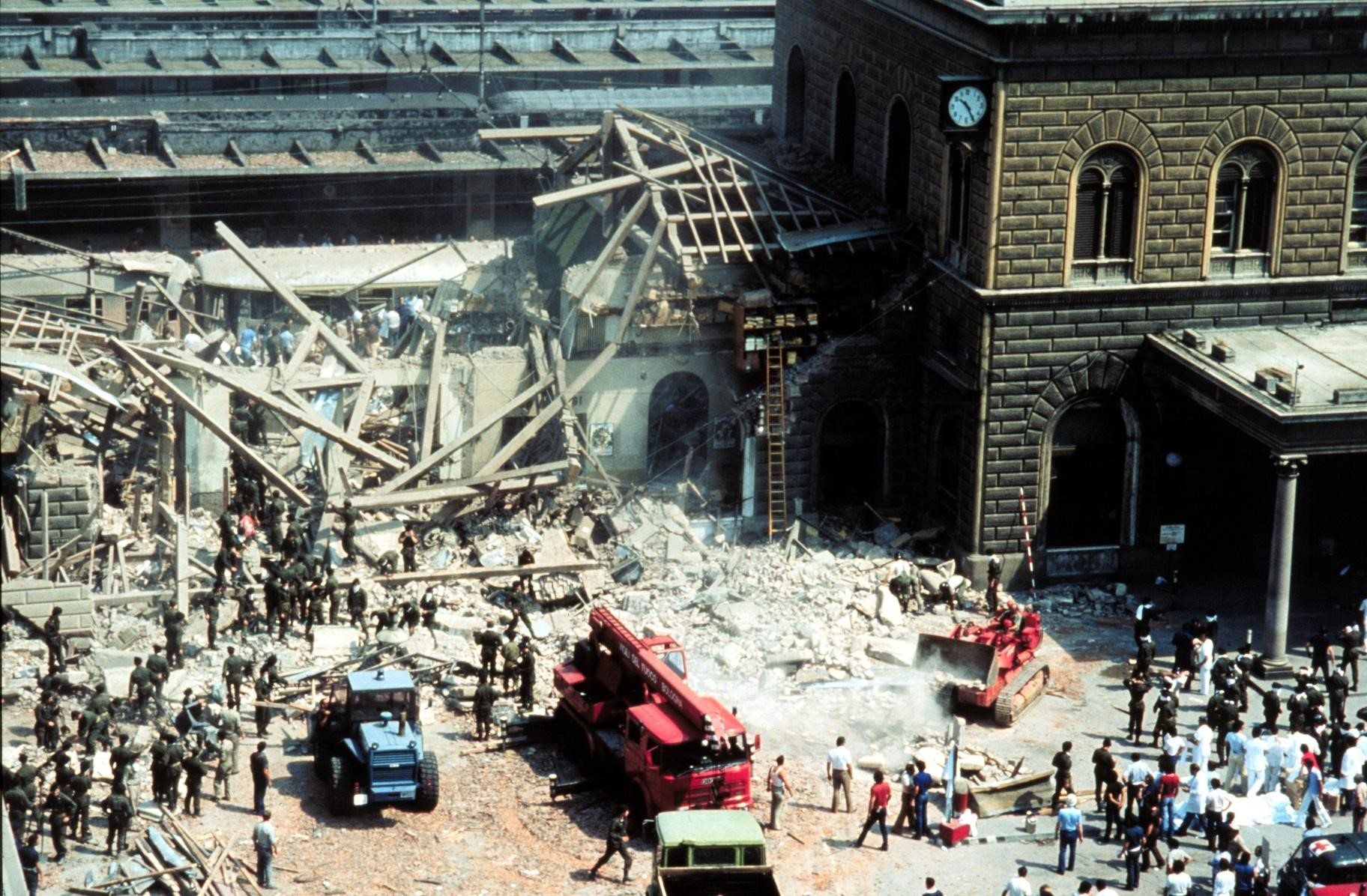
The Bologna station's west wing in ruins, hours after the bombing

At 10:25 am local time of 2 August 1980, a time bomb hidden in an unattended suitcase detonated in an air-conditioned waiting room at Bologna's train station. The final toll from the bombing was 85 people dead and over 200 wounded.

On 28 August 1980, the Public Prosecutor's Office of Bologna issued arrest orders against some eighty members of the extreme right organizations Nuclei Armati Rivoluzionari, Terza Posizione, and Movimento Rivoluzionario Popolare, among whom was also Paolo Signorelli, accusing them of conspiracy to commit crimes, subversion, and other activities related to the bombing.

Renewed investigations resulted in criminal charges, including murder, being brought against prominent figures of the Italian far-right, such as Massimiliano Fachini, the Fioravanti brothers, Francesco Pazienza, Stefano Delle Chiaie, Licio Gelli, Francesca Mambro, and Paolo Signorelli. The first trial began in Bologna on 9 March 1987. On 11 July 1988, four defendants were sentenced to life imprisonment for murder, others were convicted with lesser sentences for forming an armed gang and subversion, while Signorelli and others were acquitted. Appeals were submitted by both the defendants and the prosecution, so a new trial began in October 1989. More defendants were acquitted, including Signorelli again. After further prosecutorial appeal, on 12 February 1992, the Supreme Court of Cassation acquitted Signorelli of murder, once more. The Court also acquitted other defendants, and went on to cancel the previous trial's judgment in toto, ordering a new one on account of the sentences having been "illogical, incoherent, [and] not assessing proofs and evidence in good faith."

=== D'Amato assassination ===
On 23 June 1980, magistrate Mario Amato, appointed to resume the investigation of assassinated judge Vittorio Occorsio into the activities of the Italian extra-parliamentarian right, was himself assassinated in Rome by, as it was subsequently established, a group of NAR members. Arrests were issued for various persons, including Signorelli. In the 1986 trial, while Giusva Fioravanti, Francesca Mambro, and Gilberto Cavallini were convicted for murder and sentenced to life imprisonment, Signorelli was acquitted.

=== Incarceration ===
After his initial arrest, Signorelli remained incarcerated. He was eventually allowed to return to his home in 1987 under a regime of house arrest following a campaign led by Radical Party MP Laura Arconti, (Note: Arconti has been described as a "passionate" advocate for the Radical Party's principles and a "defender of civil rights" irrespective of ideology. See Cianfanelli (2019).) who went on hunger strike in order to publicise Signorelli's situation. The decision to allow Signorelli to return home was taken by Socialist Party MP and Minister of Justice Giuliano Vassalli. Almost ten years after he was allowed back home, all restrictions of movement were lifted.

== Ideology ==
Signorelli himself rejected the characterization of his ideological stance as "neofascist". At one point, during the discussions inside the far right, Signorelli stated his doubts about armed militancy: "Yes, we talk about [conquering] ground but structures of [our] movement are created: we tend towards action, yet this soon degenerates from a political struggle into the practice of armed [confrontation], often an end in itself."

In 1996, Signorelli published a book titled Defendant by profession (Di professione imputato) in which he related his time in prison and presented some political observations.

== Personal life ==
Signorelli met his future wife, Claudia, while studying at the university. They were married in 1959 and had two children, son Luca and daughter Silvia. According to their grandson, also named Paolo, Signorelli was a fan of Serie A football club Lazio.

Paolo's older brother, surgeon Ferdinando "Nando" Signorelli, who was elected in the 1980s in the Senate with the MSI and served in the Senate's permanent committee on health and sanity, died on 14 May 2022, at the age of 94, in Viterbo's Nuova Santa Teresa nursing home.

== Death and legacy ==
Signorelli died in Rome on 1 December 2010 from cancer.

In 2015, freelance journalist Raffaella Fanelli conducted an interview with Vincenzo Vinciguerra, the neofascist militant serving a life sentence for the 1972 bomb attack in Peteano that resulted in the killing of three carabinieri. Vinciguerra, relating the events around the years of armed militancy, mentioned Paolo Signorelli as having been "at the top" of the "fascist groups" of that period. The interview was published in La Repubblica the same year, and Signorelli's daughter, Silvia, sued the journalist for defaming the reputation of a deceased person, namely her father. In February 2018, the Court of Milan, which had been assigned the preliminary investigation of the case, terminated the proceedings against the journalist. The Court accepted that Signorelli had been a member of "an armed gang" and held a "major position" in a "subversive association," and thus decided that the suit had no merit, since "there could be no falsehoods in Vinciguerra's statements."

In October 2019, an inspector of the Roman police station in via San Vitale, by order of the Bologna prosecutor, as he stated, phoned Signorelli's 85-year-old widow, Claudia and asked her to come to the station because she was a "person of interest" concerning the Bologna bombing.
