= Aldo Semerari =

Italian criminologist (1923–1982)

Aldo Semerari

Aldo Semerari (Italian pronunciation: [ˈaldo semeˈraːri]; 8 May 1923 − March or 1 April 1982) was an Italian criminologist, anthropologist and psychiatrist. He was also a noted neo-fascist, who was suspected of complicity in the terror attack that killed 85 people at Bologna railway station in 1980.

== Background and career ==
Semerari was born on 8 May 1923, in Martina Franca, Apulia. He studied medicine at the University of Padua, specialising in psychiatry. During the 1970s he was Professor of Criminal Anthropology at the University of Rome, La Sapienza, and a director of the university's Institute of Forensic Psychopathology. His academic interests primarily involved the study of sadomasochism and sexual crimes. He was also the first to translate the works of the German-Swiss psychiatrist and philosopher Karl Jaspers into Italian.

In 1962, Semerari came to public attention when he was asked to provide a psychiatric analysis of the writer and film-maker Pier Paolo Pasolini, who was then on trial for attempting to steal two thousand lire from a petrol station. In his report, Semerari pronounced Pasolini to be a "sexual deviant" and "instinctive psychopath", whose voyeurism and criminal tendencies were stimulated by his communist affiliations. Semerari considered Pasolini's refusal to acknowledge his deviancy as further evidence of mental instability, declaring that Pasolini was "so deeply abnormal that he accepts his abnormality in full consciousness, to the point of being unable to judge it as such." Having neglected to interview Pasolini in person, Semerari did not succeed in getting his evidence accepted by the court, but his report's findings were published before the trial ended and repeated uncritically by sections of the popular press. The controversial nature of Semerari's evaluation of Pasolini did not dent his status as a leading consultant to the criminal courts in Rome, and throughout the following two decades his psychiatric evaluations continued to influence judicial rulings.

In the 1970s, Semerari was also involved in making films himself, developing a partnership with the director and screenwriter Brunello Rondi. He and Rondi wrote the screenplay for the film Valeria Inside and Outside (Valeria dentro e fuori, 1972), an explicit account of a young woman's neurotic Freudian fantasies and sexual frustrations, and he received a further screenwriting credit for Rondi's sexploitation film Sex Life in a Women's Prison (Prigione di donne, 1974).

== Neo-fascist activity ==
In his youth Semerari was a communist ideologue, who belonged to the Stalinist faction of the Italian Communist Party (Partito Comunista Italiano; PCI). Corrado De Rosa recounts in his book La mente nera that Semerari cultivated a partisan image while still in Martina Franca, frequently wearing a fur hat, leather jacket, red star and pistol holster, and was a member of a gang that placed a bomb in the house of the local Christian Democrat member of the Constituent Assembly, for which he received a short spell in jail in 1946 before benefitting from a general amnesty. Semerari later spent time in Prague as a cadre, having specifically requested that he be sent there for training. In 1954, however, he suddenly pivoted to the extreme right, becoming a convert to national socialism. Several news outlets later reported that his home contained a substantial collection of Nazi and Fascist memorabilia, including military uniforms and photographs of Hitler and Mussolini, which friends and associates dismissed in public as merely a hobby. Although never a prominent figure within the neo-fascist movement, by the late 1970s Semerari had become one of the leaders of a small group of ultra-right intellectuals and agitators called "Let's Build Action" (Costruiamo l'azione). He was also a member of the Propaganda Due (P2) masonic lodge, reputedly maintaining links with SISMI, the Italian military intelligence agency.

As John Dickie explains, Semerari's main significance lay in his position at the intersection of subversive political activity and organised crime. He was convinced that establishing partnerships with criminal gangs would accelerate the strategia della tensione (literally, the "strategy of tension"), the process by which "revolutionary" activity would exacerbate public discontent and bring about the fall of the democratic state, and to this end he had by the late 1970s cultivated close ties with the recently established Roman criminal syndicate, the Banda della Magliana, whose meetings were often organised by him at his summer villa in Rieti. Alongside the former Italian Social Movement (Movimento Sociale Italiano; MSI) parliamentarian Fabio De Felice and history teacher Paolo Signorelli, Semerari also hosted a number of seminars with various far-right militants at around this time, which Jeffrey Bale suggests were convened to discuss a "new decentralized and self-financing terrorist strategy", modelled on the activities of the Red Brigades, that could "consolidate the remnants of various extremist groups" in the face of official state crackdowns and the flight of several neo-fascist leaders to "safer havens abroad". Bale notes that the seminars' participants frequently disagreed about which was the best route to achieve their goals, with Semerari and De Felice emerging as the leaders of a "traditionalist" faction that eschewed direct revolutionary action in favour of constructing a logistical base that would bring together like-minded militant groups and individuals.

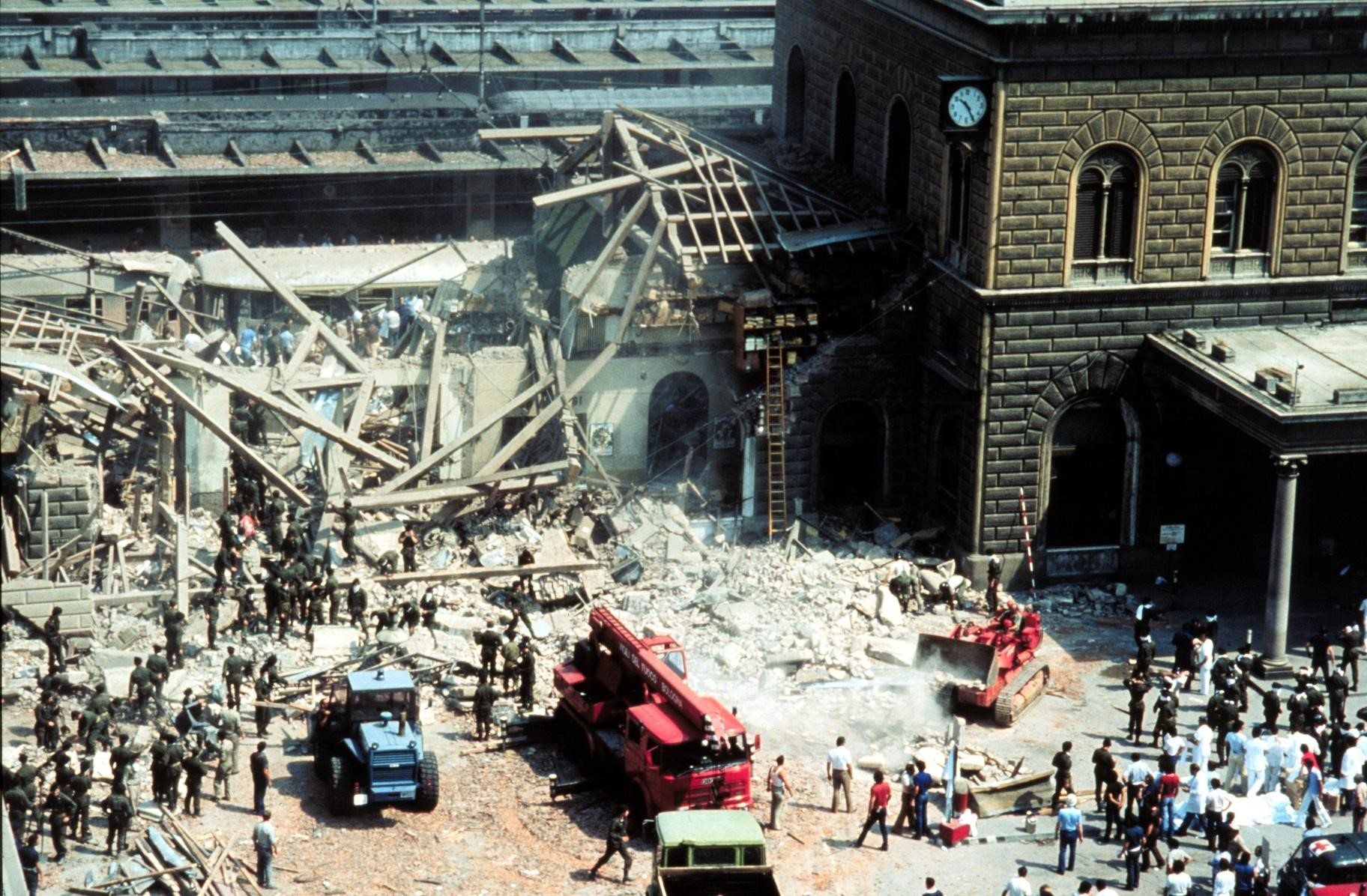
The ruins of Bologna station following the 1980 bombing.

In exchange for financial support for his organisation, Semerari helped the members of various criminal organisations evade imprisonment when they were arrested, devising strategies for coping with police interrogation and writing reports that sought to establish either innocence or lack of culpability, which were usually supported by a fraudulent diagnosis of mental infirmity. In addition to the Banda della Magliana, Semerari made similar deals with both Raffaele Cutolo's New Organised Camorra (Nuova Camorra Organizzata; NCO) and one of Cutulo's main rivals, the New Family (Nuova Famiglia; NF) headed by Carmine Alfieri. Franco Ferraresi later concluded that Semerari's efforts in keeping criminals away from severe punishment bore fruit, as his diagnoses were "critical in obtaining lenient terms for many of them."

In August 1980, Semerari was one of a trio of neo-fascist pedagogues − the other two were Signorelli and Claudio Mutti − arrested on suspicion of involvement in the bombing of Bologna Centrale railway station earlier that month, which claimed the lives of 85 people and wounded over 200 more. Semerari was, according to The Observer, held by the police at his home in Rieti and taken to a top-security prison for further interrogation. Pino Rauti, a leading figure on the neo-fascist right and a friend of Signorelli, announced in a press statement that the accusations regarding the culpability of Semerari and the other detainees were "fabricated by members of the Italian secret services to discredit the political right." Semerari remained in prison for a further seven months on charges of subversive association and forming armed groups, until he was freed in April 1981 due to a lack of evidence. During captivity he suffered (in the words of Ferraresi) a "psychological breakdown", which ensured that he remained a patient at the San Camillo hospital in Rome and (later) at his own clinic, the Villa Mafalda, even after being formally released from court supervision. A la Repubblica article, published in 1985, alleged that Semerari − who had been assaulted while in prison − lived in fear from this point onwards, as he believed that his erstwhile 'comrades' suspected him of having named those responsible for the Bologna bombing in order to secure an early release, and were planning on killing him in revenge.

== Murder ==
On 23 March 1982 Semerari travelled to Naples, ostensibly to meet a local Camorra leader, Umberto Ammaturo, who was on the run from the police and had requested a psychiatric certificate. Ammaturo was already a client of Semerari, having previously escaped a custodial sentence by heeding the latter's advice to feign insanity during police interviews. Semerari was last seen, according to the Irish Times, leaving the Royal Hotel in Naples on 26 March in the company of three "Camorra men". Three days later the offices of the communist newspaper l'Unità received a letter, signed by Semerari himself, which claimed that he was the man responsible for writing a notorious fake "official document" alleging that Vincenzo Scotti, a government minister, had visited Raffaele Cutolo in Ascoli Piceno jail the previous year to seek assistance in rescuing a Christian Democrat politician, Ciro Cirillo, who had been held captive by the Red Brigades for several months. Semerari's decapitated body was then discovered on 1 April in a stolen Fiat 128 parked near the town hall in Ottaviano, Campania, close to the headquarters of the NCO. According to the journalist Alessandro Silj, his corpse had been there "for some days".

The circumstances surrounding Semerari's murder were the subject of intense speculation for years afterwards. In March 1985, during an investigation by the Public Prosecutor of Bologna into the 1980 railway station bombing, a former SISMI official named Demetrio Cogliandro (latterly head of counter-intelligence operations and known by the codename "Capemuorto") claimed that Semerari had sought help from the security services the day before he was kidnapped. In his deposition, given in the prosecutor's office, Cogliandro recalled that:

One evening around 8pm, I received a phone call from Renato Era [administrator of the Villa Mafalda clinic, and thus known to Semerari] who at the time was providing me with news, especially on account of the Libyans hospitalised at his clinic. Era phoned me telling me that shortly before Professor Semerari had called him from the Royal Hotel in Naples, telling him that he was worried because he had to have a meeting the next day with local elements belonging to the Camorra. Semerari asked him to do something about these concerns, in practice it was clear that Semerari was asking for assistance.

Cogliandro told the prosecutor that he had contacted Giuseppe Santovito, the recently retired director of SISMI (and a member of P2), to report this information. Santovito, he said, listened to the details "without surprise" and told him: "I'll take care of it, keep the news to yourself." Contemporary press reports alighted on this revelation, with some openly suggesting that SISMI could have been involved in Semerari's death. However, despite the corroboration of Cogliandro's allegations by Era himself during the investigation, no evidence subsequently emerged to prove them beyond doubt.

In fact, Semerari was murdered on the orders of Ammaturo, an associate of Carmine Alfieri's NF, who desired revenge after discovering that his enemy, Raffaele Cutolo, had also availed himself of Semerari's services whilst in prison. Both Ammaturo and his lover, Pupetta Maresca, were later arrested and charged with Semerari's murder, although the former managed to escape justice by fleeing to Africa and then to South America. Maresca, having remained in Italy to face the charges, would serve four years in prison before she and Ammaturo were acquitted on appeal in 1989 due to a lack of evidence. Although Maresca continued to deny any role in the murder, Ammaturo subsequently confessed to his involvement when he decided to become a pentito (state witness or "supergrass") in June 1993. In May 2010, after being released and provided with a new identity in exchange for his testimony, he admitted to personally beheading Semerari in an interview with La Repubblica. "I cut off [Semerari's] head", Ammaturo stated, "... because he had committed himself to us in the New Family, to follow le cose nostre, and he was well paid by me personally, but Cutolo had someone killed in the security chambers of the courthouse and Semerari gave him a false report to have him acquitted... He was a traitor, whoever makes a deal and doesn't keep it is a traitor."

== Personal life ==
In addition to his collection of Fascist memorabilia, Semerari was also renowned for his love of fine wine and classical music. He bred Dobermann dogs, reportedly communicating to them only in German.

Semerari's assistant was Fiorella Carrara, who was found dead from gunshot wounds in her apartment in Rome soon after Semerari's body was discovered. Although police investigators declared her death a suicide there have since been rumours of foul play, as her house was burgled and searched by persons unknown shortly afterwards.

Semerari was married to Elda Colasanti, who survived him. His son is the psychiatrist Antonio Semerari.

== Sources: books, journal articles and theses ==
- Allum, Felia Skyle, 'The Neapolitan Camorra: Crime and politics in post-war Naples (1950–92)', Ph.D. thesis, Brunel University (2000).
- (in Italian) Ansaldo, Marco and Yasemin Taksin, Uccidete il Papa (Milan: Biblioteca Universale Rizzoli, 2013). ISBN 9788858647332
- Arlacchi, Pino, Mafia Business: the Mafia Ethic and the Spirit of Capitalism (London: Verso, 1986). ISBN 9780860911357
- Bale, Jeffrey, 'The "Black" Terrorist International: Neo-Fascist Paramilitary Networks and the "Strategy of Tension" in Italy, 1968–1974', Ph.D. thesis, University of California, Berkeley (1994).
- Behan, Tom, The Camorra (London: Routledge, 1996). ISBN 0-415-09987-0
- Curti, Roberto, 'Rediscovering Brunello Rondi', Offscreen, Volume 15, Issue 12 (December 2011).
- (in Italian) De Rosa, Corrado, La mente nera (Rome: Sperling & Kupfer, 2014). ISBN 9788820056001
- Dickie, John, Mafia Brotherhoods: Camorra, Mafia, 'ndrangheta: The Rise of the Honoured Societies (London: Sceptre, 2012). ISBN 9780340963944
- Ferraresi, Franco, Threats to Democracy: the Radical Right in Italy after the War (Princeton, N.J.: Princeton University Press, 1997). ISBN 9780691044996
- Hodgson, Francis, Who's Who in Science in Europe: a Reference Guide to European Scientists (Guernsey: Hodgson, 1978).
- (in French) Klein, Jean-Claude, 'Le lynchage d'un pédé', Le Berdache, Issue 6 (December 1979 − January 1980).
- (in Italian) Lucarelli, Carlo, Storie di bande criminali, di mafie e di persone oneste: dai Misteri d'Italia di Blu notte (Turin: Einaudi, 2008). ISBN 9788806195021
- Schwartz, Barth David, Pasolini Requiem (New York, N.Y.: Vintage Books, 1995). ISBN 9780679733492
