= Di Mambro =

Di Mambro is an Italian surname. Notable people with the surname include:

- Ann Marie Di Mambro (born 1950), Scottish playwright and screenwriter
- Joseph Di Mambro (1924–1994), French cult leader

== See also ==
- Francesca Mambro (born 1959), former far-right Italian terrorist
