= Bologna massacre =

1980 terrorist bombing of train station in Bologna, Italy

Coordinates: 44°30′21.5″N 11°20′34.5″E

- Part of the Years of Lead
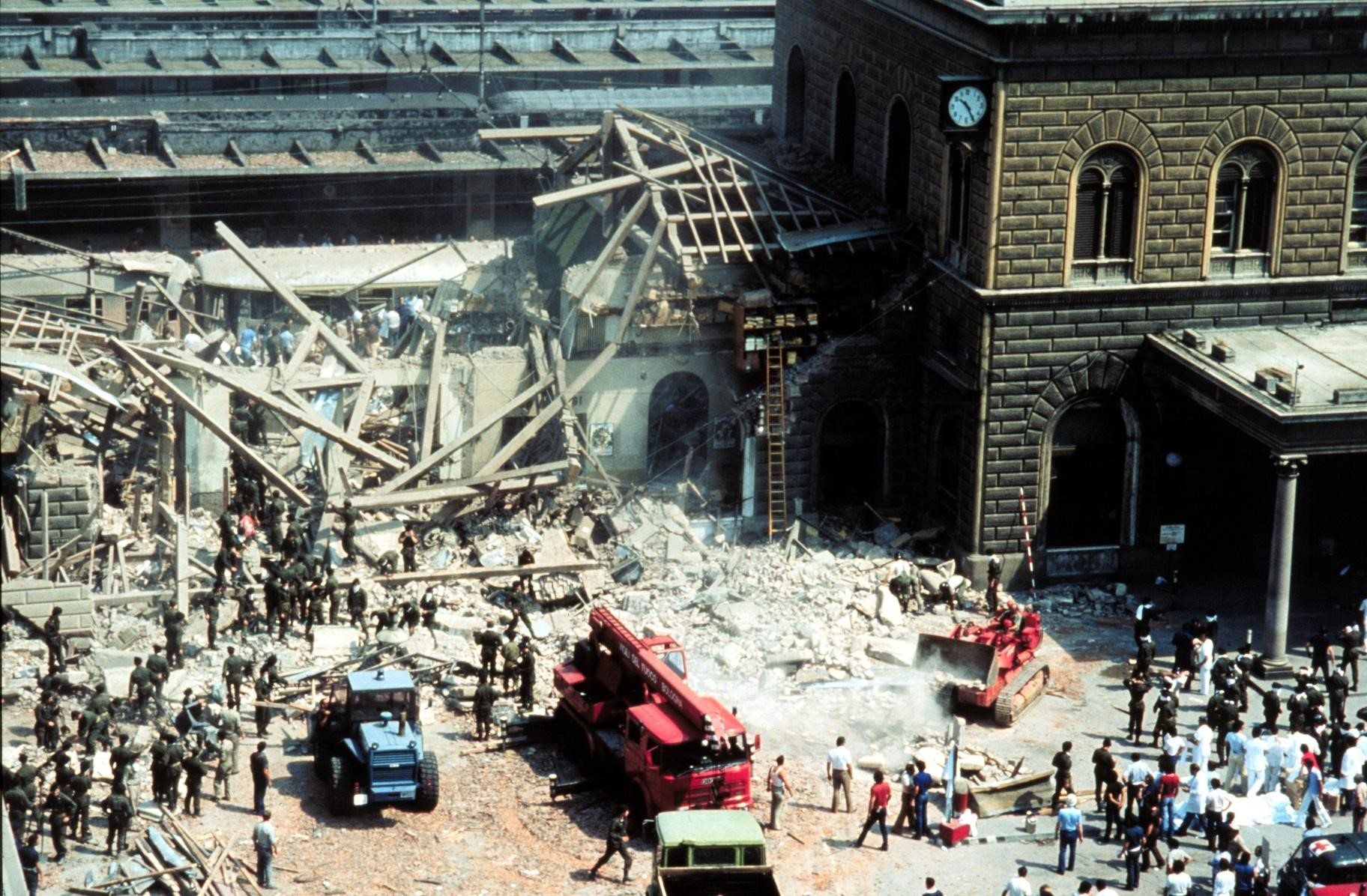
- Ruins of the Bologna station west wing
- Location: Bologna Centrale railway station, Italy
- Date: 2 August 1980; 10:25 (UTC+2)
- Attack type: Bombing
- Weapon: Time bomb
- Deaths: 85
- Injuries: 200+
- Perpetrators: Luigi Ciavardini, Valerio Fioravanti, and Francesca Mambro (members of the Nuclei Armati Rivoluzionari)

The Bologna massacre (Italian: strage di Bologna) was a terrorist bombing of the Bologna Centrale railway station in Bologna, Italy, on the morning of 2 August 1980, which killed 85 people and wounded over 200. Several members of the neo-fascist terrorist organization Nuclei Armati Rivoluzionari (NAR, Armed Revolutionary Nuclei) were sentenced for the bombing, although the group denied involvement. Investigations in the 2020s, following prosecutions from the Bologna Corte d'Assise, declared Licio Gelli, along with other members of the masonic lodge and secret society Propaganda Due, as the mastermind behind the massacre.

== Events ==
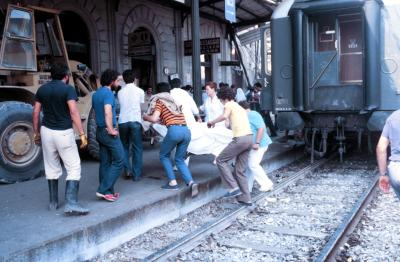
Bystanders assisting the rescue operation

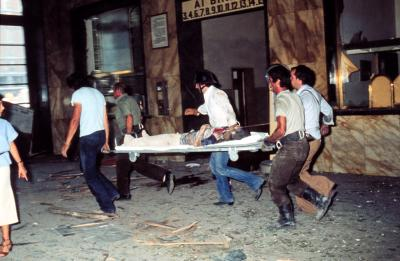
Rescuers carrying a victim

At 10:25 CEST, a time bomb hidden in an unattended suitcase detonated in the second-class waiting room at the Bologna station, crowded with tourists and people leaving for or returning from vacation. The explosion collapsed the roof of the waiting room, destroyed most of the main building, and hit the Ancona–Chiasso train, which was waiting at the first platform.

Due to the large number of casualties and an insufficient number of emergency vehicles available to transport the injured to hospitals, firefighters used buses, private cars, and taxis. Many passers-by and travellers provided first aid to victims and helped rescue people who were buried under the rubble. Some doctors and hospital staff returned early from vacation to care for the victims, and hospital departments which were closed for the summer holidays were reopened to accommodate the casualties.

After the attack, large demonstrations were held in Piazza Maggiore (Bologna's central square). Harsh criticism was directed at government representatives who attended the 6 August funerals of the victims in the Basilica San Petronio. The only applause was reserved for President Sandro Pertini, who arrived by helicopter in Bologna at 5:30 pm the day of the massacre and tearfully said: "I have no words; we are facing the most criminal enterprise that has ever taken place in Italy."

The #37 bus (used to transport victims) and the clock (stopped at 10:25) were symbols of the massacre. The attack was the worst atrocity in Italy since World War II. According to a 1982 study covering the effects of the bombing, 291 were injured, of whom 73 died at the scene, and an additional 11 people died in hospitals.

== Investigation ==
The government, led by Christian Democratic Prime Minister Francesco Cossiga, first assumed that the incident was due to an accidental explosion of an old boiler in the station's basement. Evidence, however, soon pointed to terrorism. L'Unità, the Italian Communist Party (PCI) newspaper, attributed responsibility for the attack to neo-fascists on 3 August. Later, in a special session of the Senate, Cossiga also supported the theory that neo-fascists were behind the attack: "Unlike leftist terrorism, which strikes at the heart of the state through its representatives, right-wing terrorism prefers acts such as massacres because acts of extreme violence promote panic and impulsive reactions." The bomb was later found to be composed of 23 kilograms (51 lb) of explosives: 5 kilograms (11 lb) of TNT and Composition B and 18 kilograms (40 lb) of T4 (nitroglycerin for civil use).

=== False leads ===
Generals Pietro Musumeci, a member of Propaganda Due (P2), and Belmonte of SISMI had a police sergeant put a suitcase full of explosives on a train in Bologna. The suitcase also contained personal items belonging to two right-wing extremists, a Frenchman, and a German. Musumeci also produced a phony dossier, entitled "Terror on trains". He was charged with falsifying evidence to incriminate Roberto Fiore and Gabriele Adinolfi, two leaders of the far-right Terza Posizione who had fled to London. Both Terza Posizione leaders said that Musumeci was trying to divert attention from P2 head Licio Gelli.

== Prosecution ==
The attack has been attributed to the NAR (Armed Revolutionary Nuclei), a neo-fascist terrorist organization. A long, controversial court case began after the bombing. Francesca Mambro and Valerio Fioravanti were initially sentenced to life imprisonment.

The Supreme Court upheld the conviction of Luigi Ciavardini, an NAR member with close ties to Terza Posizione, in April 2007. Ciavardini received a 30-year prison sentence for his role in the attack. He had been arrested after the armed robbery of the Banca Unicredito di Roma on 15 September 2005. Ciavardini was also charged with the assassinations of Francesco Evangelista on 28 May 1980 and Judge Mario Amato on 23 June 1980.

On 26 August 1980, the prosecutor of Bologna issued twenty-eight arrest warrants for far-right militants of the NAR and Terza Posizione. Among those arrested were Massimo Morsello (future founder of the neo-fascist organization and political party Forza Nuova), Francesca Mambro, Aldo Semerari, Maurizio Neri, and Paolo Signorelli. They were interrogated in Ferrara, Rome, Padua, and Parma. All were released from prison in 1981. Semerari was murdered by the Camorra a year later.

The first trial began in Bologna on 9 March 1987. Massimiliano Fachini, Valerio Fioravanti, Francesca Mambro, Sergio Picciafuoco, Roberto Rinani and Paolo Signorelli were charged with murder. Gilberto Cavallini, Fachini, Fioravanti, Egidio Giuliani, Marcello Iannilli, Mambro, Giovanni Melioli, Picciafuoco, Roberto Raho, Rinani and Signorelli were charged with forming an armed gang. Marco Ballan, Giuseppe Belmonte, Fabio De Felice, Stefano Delle Chiaie, Fachini, Licio Gelli, Maurizio Giorgi, Pietro Musumeci, Francesco Pazienza, Signorelli and Adriano Tilgher were charged with subversive association. Belmonte, Gelli, Musumeci and Pazienza were charged with defamation.

On 11 July 1988, Fachini, Fioravanti, Mambro and Picciafuoco were sentenced to life imprisonment for murder; Rinani and Signorelli were acquitted. Cavallini, Fachini, Fioravanti, Giuliani, Mambro, Picciafuoco, Rinani and Signorelli were convicted of forming an armed gang; Iannilli, Melioli and Raho were acquitted. Ballan, Belmonte, Felice, Delle Chiaie, Fachini, Gelli, Giorgi, Musumeci, Pazienza, Signorelli and Tilgher were acquitted of subversive association. Belmonte, Gelli, Musumeci and Pazienza were convicted of defamation. The appeal process began on 25 October 1989.

On appeal, Fachini, Fioravanti, Mambro, Picciafuoco, Rinani and Signorelli were acquitted of murder on 18 July 1990. Cavallini, Fioravanti, Mambro and Giuliani were convicted of forming an armed gang. Belmonte and Musumeci were convicted of defamation, and the other defendants were acquitted.

On 12 February 1992, the Supreme Court of Cassation acquitted Rinani and Signorelli of murder; Signorelli was also acquitted of forming an armed gang and subversive association. The court also acquitted other defendants, canceled the judgment and ordered a new trial because the sentences were "illogical, incoherent, not assessing proofs and evidence in good terms, not taking into account the facts preceding and following the event, unmotivated or poorly motivated, in some parts the judges supporting unlikely arguments that not even the defense had argued".

The new trial began on 11 October 1993. Massimiliano Fachini, Valerio Fioravanti, Francesca Mambro, and Sergio Picciafuoco were charged with murder; Gilberto Cavallini, Massimiliano Fachini, Egidio Giuliani, Valerio Fioravanti, Francesca Mambro, Sergio Picciafuoco and Roberto Rinani were charged with forming an armed gang, and Giuseppe Belmonte, Licio Gelli, Pietro Musumeci, and Francesco Pazienza were charged with defamation. On 16 May 1994, Fioravanti, Mambro and Picciafuoco were sentenced to life imprisonment; Fachini was acquitted. Cavallini, Fioravanti, Giuliani, Mambro and Picciafuoco were also convicted of forming an armed gang; Fachini and Rinani were acquitted. Belmonte, Gelli, Musumeci and Pazienza were convicted of defamation.

On 23 November 1995, the Supreme Court upheld the convictions of Fioravanti, Mambro, Gelli, Pazienza, Musumeci and Belmonte, ordering a new trial for Picciafuoco (who was acquitted by the Appeals Court in Florence on 18 June 1996, a verdict upheld by the Supreme Court on 15 April 1997). In April 1998, Mambro was given home confinement and allowed to leave prison during the day.

In June 2000, Massimo Carminati (NAR member), Ivano Bongiovanni (far-right sympathizer) and Federigo Manucci Benincasa (SISMI officer) were convicted of obstruction. Carminati and Manucci Benincasa were acquitted for lack of evidence in December 2001, and Bongiovanni's conviction was upheld. On 30 January 2003, the Court of Cassation finally acquitted Carminati and Manucci Benincasa.

In an article written by Alfio Bernabei for the British anti-fascist Searchlight magazine in April 2022, it was reported that:

In a significant step in search for the truth behind the bombing at Bologna railway station that killed 85 people and wounded 200 on 2 August 1980 the far-right militant Paolo Bellini has been found guilty of direct involvement in the massacre. He has been sentenced to life imprisonment. The hearings at Bologna law Court began in April 2021 presided over by Judge Francesco Caruso with a number of lawyers acting on behalf of the Association of the Families of the Victims. Bellini, now 69-year-old, belonged to the far-right organisation Avanguardia Nazionale on whose instigation he killed a young left wing militant, Alceste Campanile, in 1975. In 1999, he confessed to this killing adding that he had also killed a number of people on behalf of mafia bosses. But he denied any involvement in the Bologna massacre.

== Alternative theories ==
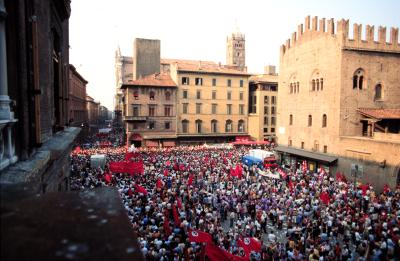
Funerals of the victims

As a result of protracted legal procedures and false leads, a number of theories were proposed during the years after the attack. Involvement by Italian Secret Service officials was suggested.

Between 1999 and 2006, during sessions of the parliamentary commission established to probe terrorism in Italy and the failure to identify those responsible for the massacre and a commission investigating the Mitrokhin Archive and Italian intelligence activity, new information emerged on international terrorist networks and Italian intelligence in the former Soviet bloc and Arab countries such as Syria, Lebanon, Libya, Yemen and Iraq. Secret agreements with the Palestinian leadership tied to arms trafficking between the Popular Front for the Liberation of Palestine and Italy and a warning to the Italian anti-terrorist secret service three weeks before the massacre were discovered. Thomas Kram, member of a German terrorist group linked to Carlos the Jackal and the Palestinians, was in Bologna on the day of the massacre. On 17 November 2005, the Bologna prosecutor opened a case (Dossier 7823/2005 RG) against unknown persons. According to media reports in 2004 and 2007, Francesco Cossiga suggested Palestinian involvement in a letter to Enzo Fragalà of the Mitrokhin Commission.

In 2005, Carlos the Jackal said that "the Mitrokhin Commission attempts to falsify history" and "they were the CIA and the Mossad to hit in Bologna" with the intent to punish Italy for its relationship with the PLO.

After the 2006 arrest of former Argentine Triple A member Rodolfo Almirón, Spanish lawyer José Angel Pérez Nievas declared that it was "probable that Almirón participated—along with Stefano Delle Chiaie and Augusto Cauchi—in the 1980 bombing in Bologna's train station". In 1998, the Supreme Court of Argentina refused to extradite Cauchi to Italy.

In May 2007, Massimo Sparti's son said: "My father has always lied about the Bologna investigation".

During a 2008 BBC interview, former Italian president Francesco Cossiga reaffirmed his belief that the massacre was attributable to Palestinian resistance groups operating in Italy (rather than fascist right-wing terrorism) and in the innocence of Francesca Mambro and Valerio Fioravanti. The PFLP has always denied responsibility. On 19 August 2011, the Bologna prosecutor began an investigation of two German terrorists: Thomas Kram and Christa Margot Fröhlich, both linked to Carlos the Jackal's group and in Bologna on the day of the attack.

== Legacy ==
Relatives of the victims formed the Associazione dei familiari delle vittime della strage alla stazione di Bologna del 2 agosto 1980 on 1 June 1981 to raise and maintain awareness of the bombing. The group, which began with 44 members, grew to 300. On 6 April 1983, the association and victims' associations of victims of the Piazza Fontana, Piazza della Loggia and Italicus Express bombings formed the Union of Relatives of Victims to Massacres (Unione dei Familiari delle Vittime per Stragi) in Milan.

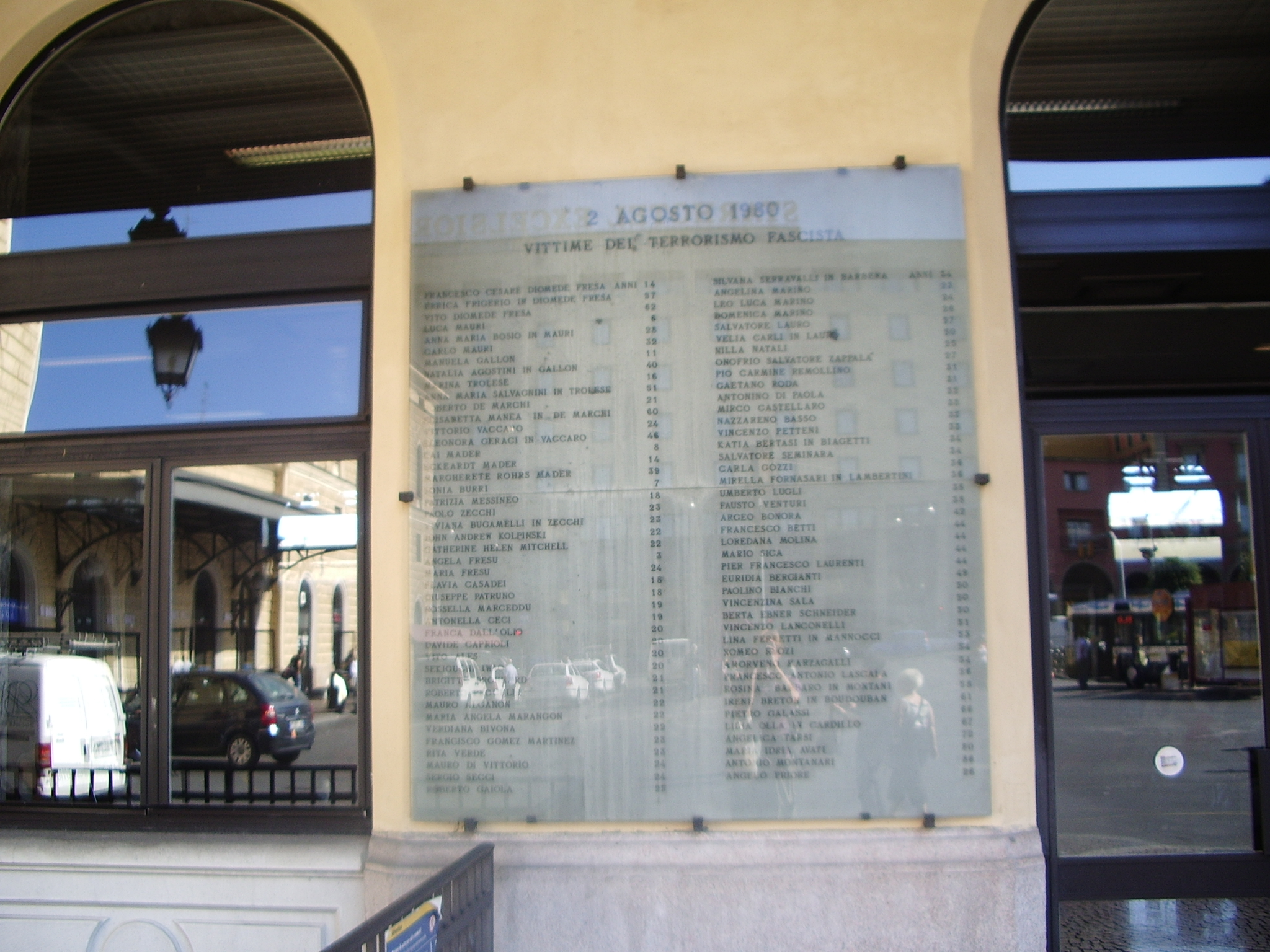
Plaque at the Bologna Central Station

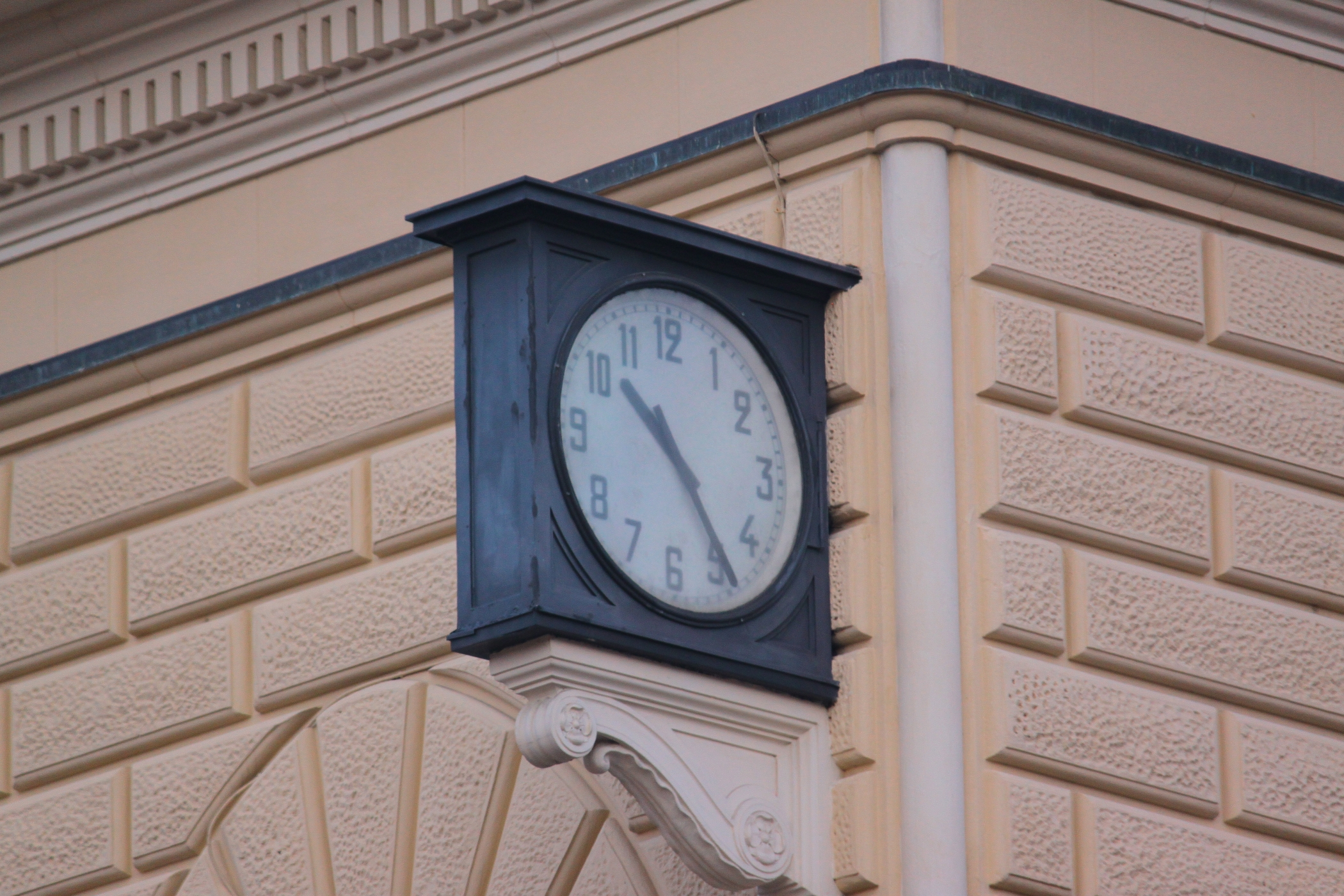
While initially repaired, the clock at Bologna Centrale railway station was permanently fixed at 10:25 to commemorate the massacre in 1996.

Bologna and the Associazione tra i familiari delle vittime della strage alla stazione di Bologna del 2 agosto 1980 sponsor an annual international composition competition which ends with a concert in Piazza Maggiore on 2 August, a national memorial day for all terrorist massacres. Although the damaged part of the station has been mostly reconstructed, the original floor tile pierced by the detonation has been left in place and a deep crack has been left in the reconstructed main wall (covered by a glass panel). The explosion also caused the station clock to stop at 10:25, the time of the incident; images of the stopped clock quickly became a visual symbol of the tragedy. The clock was initially repaired but in 1996, the authorities decided to permanently fix it at 10:25 as a commemoration.

In February and July 2020, the Italian weekly L'Espresso published a reportage claiming the couple Licio Gelli-Umberto Ortolani financed the terrorists of the bombing and subsequently took care of the necessary red herrings thanks to the support of Federico Umberto D'Amato.

The International Composing Competition "2 Agosto" was established on behalf of the Association of the families of the victims of the massacre, and has run annually since 1995.

== In popular culture ==
Robert Hellenga's 1998 novel The Fall of a Sparrow focuses on how the aftermath of the bombing affects a (fictional) American family. The protagonist becomes caught up in the prosecution of the perpetrators and life in Bologna. The bombing is the backdrop of a chapter of Laurent Binet's The Seventh Function of Language. The 2017 French novel, which satirizes late-20th-century Parisian intellectual and political life, involves two detectives investigating what they assume to be the murder of the philosopher Roland Barthes. The detectives, who travel to Bologna to interview Umberto Eco, narrowly escape injury in the attack.

The Cattleya production of Romanzo Criminale series features an investigation into the bombing and the role of the Italian Secret Service across both seasons.

== Gallery ==
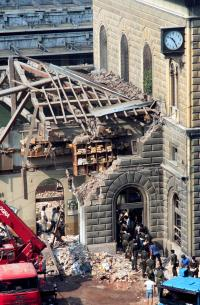

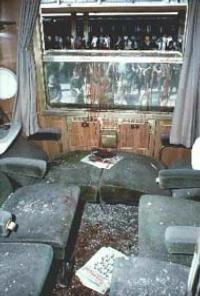

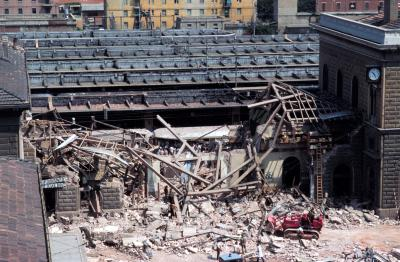

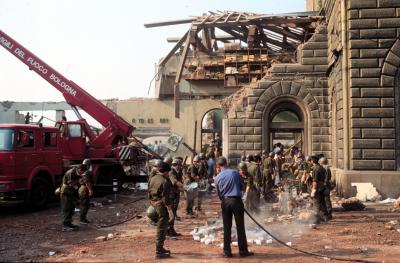

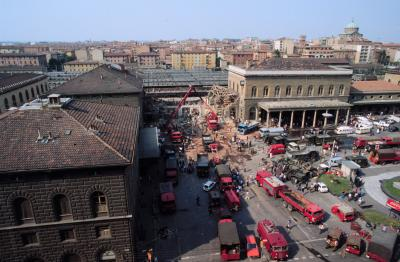

== See also ==
- Banda della Magliana, a mafia gang with links to the fascist-aligned NAR
- False flag operations
- List of terrorist incidents
- Itavia Flight 870
- La notte della Repubblica (TV programme)
- List of massacres in Italy
- Piazza Fontana bombing
- Strategy of tension
- Games of the XXII Olympiad (Moscow)
- Propaganda Due (P2 lodge)
- Carlos the Jackal
- Terrorism in Europe
- Operation Gladio
