= Pasquale Simonetti =

Italian criminal (1926–1955)

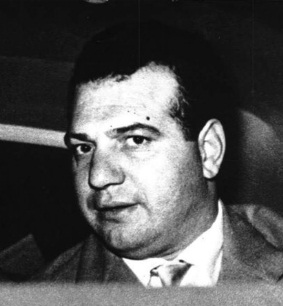
- Camorra boss Pasquale Simonetti
- Born: 26 February 1926; Palma Campania, Kingdom of Italy
- Died: 16 July 1955 (aged 29); Naples, Italy
- Other name: Pascalone 'e Nola
- Spouse: Pupetta Maresca (m. 1955)
- Children: 1
- Allegiance: Camorra

Pasquale Simonetti (Italian pronunciation: [paˈskwaːle simoˈnetti]; 26 February 1926 – 16 July 1955), known as Pascalone 'e Nola ("big Pasquale from Nola"), was an Italian criminal of the Camorra, a Mafia-type organisation in Naples and Campania in Italy. His murder and, more specifically, the revenge killing by his widow Pupetta Maresca of the man who ordered the murder, made headlines internationally and inspired a film, La sfida (The Challenge), by the acclaimed Italian movie director Francesco Rosi.

== Early life and career ==
Simonetti was born in a poor family in Palma Campania, a town located at the foot of the Vesuvius in the hinterland of Naples about 25 km east of the city. His father was a carter and his mother was a housewife. His criminal career started in the 1940s during World War II falsifying ration books for food which he then sold on the black market. Subsequently, he entered the lucrative control over the fruit and vegetable business at the Naples open-air market exchange located in Corso Novara, near Naples Central Station.

In the early 1950s the Camorra controlled the entire chain of the fruit and vegetable markets. They imposed themselves as the protectors of the peasant farmers and shopkeepers, demanding in exchange the right to fix the price of products and control the business. They set whatever price they wanted and were called "the presidents of prices".

This type of mediation racket developed in the immediate post-war period. Weak modern market structures were regulated by violent mediators who imposed their own business rules. Farmers who did not accept the conditions would be threatened or their farm would go up in flames. Bigger companies like Cirio, a large tinned tomatoes company in Campania, also fell victim to these practices. It was very complicated, if not impossible, to collect sufficient evidence to prove the criminal aspect of this business.

== Emerging Camorra boss ==
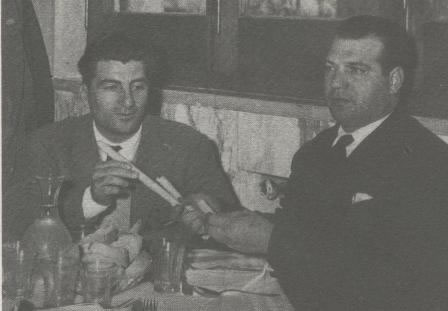
Antonio Esposito (left) and Pasquale Simonetti (right)

Simonetti became a partner of Antonio Esposito, known as Totonno 'e Pomigliano, a Camorra boss from Pomigliano d'Arco. The other of the three main "price presidents" that controlled the trade was Alfredo Maisto of Giugliano. The coexistence between these three men was tumultuous, interspersed by conflicts over their respective areas of competence and resulting shoot-outs. In the end Simonetti managed to prevail and became the sole price president in a market with a turnover of tens of billions of lire: the Campania region exported 30 per cent of the entire national fruit and vegetable production at the time. The potato transactions alone, the "price president" earned three or four million per day.

Simonetti was a real guappo, an imposing man with great charisma and a robust physique. "He was a tall man, nearly two meters, a gigantic man who always had a way of behaving, a 'guappaesica' way of doing things, a self-assured man", according to a contemporary. He used this to his advantage and became a kind of lawgiver in his area. To a certain extent he was an alternative to the State authorities which were barely present. Some of his fellow citizens turned to him to ask for justice. A typical episode was the intimidation of a man who had made his girlfriend pregnant and then left her. Simonetti asked the young man, if he preferred spending ten thousand lire in flowers on his marriage or his funeral.

He is often claimed to have slapped notorious American gangster Lucky Luciano in the face at the race track of Agnano; however, the actual perpetrator was Francesco Pirozzi, one of the men of Camorra boss Alfredo Maisto.

== Cigarette smuggling ==
After World War II the Italian government reintroduced a state monopoly on tobacco. However, the increasing post-war demand for cigarettes could not be satisfied by the state industry. The vast supplies of American and British troops stationed in Naples provided for a black market of popular American cigarettes, the americane or bionde (blondes). When the Allies left in 1946 that supply disappeared and the government was forced to ration cigarettes. Soon a thriving trade smuggling cigarettes from Marseille, Gibraltar, Nice and Tangiers by highly organised and structured foreign criminal groups (the Marseillais, Corsicans, Sicilians) developed, employing local guappi to distribute the cigarettes.

Some of the more ambitious ones, like Simonetti and Maisto, became more involved. The competition was stiff and resulted in a number of armed conflicts with rival crews. In 1953, Simonetti was imprisoned for 8 years and 3 months for the attempted murder and a shoot-out over territorial supremacy against a rival gang led by Alfredo Maisto in 1952.

== Marriage with Pupetta Maresca ==
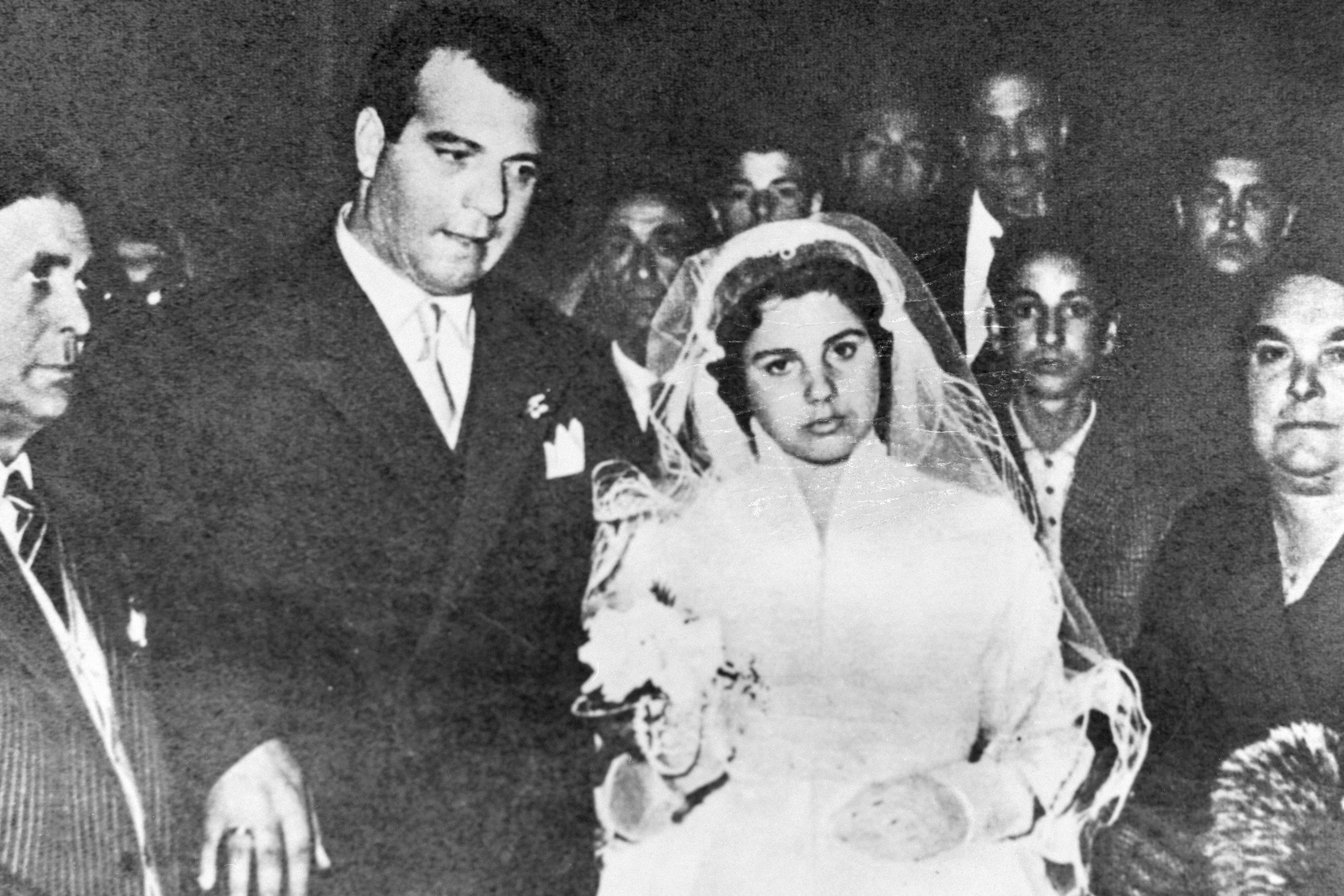
Pupetta Maresca and Pasquale Simonetti wedding photo

Simonetti and Assunta Maresca at their wedding dinner, behind the bride is Antonio Esposito

At Christmas 1954, Simonetti left prison, after serving two years of his sentence. On 27 April 1955, he married Assunta Maresca, known as Pupetta (Little Doll), a former beauty queen. The wedding was like a fairy tale with 500 guests, a lot of food and even his rivals Maisto and Esposito. The whole town of Palma Campania turned out to wish them well. Many gave them the traditional envelopes stuffed with money.

Although his criminal activities slowed down under the influence of his young wife, he sought to regain his lost prestige and activities. While in prison, his partner Antonio Esposito had taken over his businesses. He had promised to keep a percentage of the profits for Simonetti, but he did not keep his promise. Jealousy and fierce competition grew with "both believing that they ruled over the market district of Il Vasto" resulting in a violent war between the two.

== Murder and revenge ==
On 16 July 1955, at age 29, Simonetti was murdered in broad day light in the Corso Novara, the busy market place of Naples. He was shot by Carlo Gaetano Orlando, alias Tanino 'e Bastimento, a small-time criminal in Esposito's entourage, and Gaetano Nuvoletta. The six months pregnant Pupetta was devastated. She believed the police knew who the man behind the attack was, but were not prepared to do anything about it. On 4 October 1955, she drove to Naples with her younger brother, Ciro. When they met Esposito, she reached into her handbag and pulled out a Smith & Wesson .38. Holding it with both hands ("I was afraid I would miss," she explained later), she opened fire and killed Esposito in broad daylight.

On 14 October 1955, she was arrested. The trial began in April 1959 at the Court of Assizes in Naples. The killing and the following trial made international headlines. At the trial, she defiantly declared: "I would do it again!" and the whole courtroom bursted into cheers. She was sentenced to 18 years’ imprisonment, later reduced to 13 years and 4 months by the Court of Appeal. Orlando was sentenced to 30 years.

Simonetti’s son Pasqualino was born in prison. In 1974, he was abducted and murdered. His death remains a mystery, but Maresca believed the assailant was Umberto Ammaturo, her new companion, who denied knowing anything about his death.

== In popular culture ==
The life of Pasquale Simonetti and Pupetta Maresca inspired the film La sfida (The Challenge) (1958), by Francesco Rosi with José Suárez as Simonetti and Rosanna Schiaffino as Maresca.

== Sources ==
- Allum, Felia (March 2000). The Neapolitan Camorra: Crime and politics in post-war Naples (1950-92) (PDF) (Thesis). Brunel University.
- Allum, Felia (2007). "Doing it for themselves or standing in for their men? Women in the Neapolitan Camorra (1950-2003)". In Fiandaca, Giovanni (ed.). Women and the Mafia: Female Roles in Organized Crime Structures. New York: Springer. pp. 9–17. ISBN 978-0-387-36537-4.
- (in Italian) Barbagallo, Francesco (2010). Storia della camorra. Rome: Laterza. ISBN 978-88-420-9259-9.
- Dickie, John (2013). Mafia Republic. Italy's Criminal Curse: Cosa Nostra, Camorra and 'Ndrangheta from 1946 to the present. London: Sceptre. ISBN 978-1-444-72640-4.
- (in Italian) Di Fiore, Gigi (1993). Potere camorrista: quattro secoli di malanapoli. Naples: Guida Editori. ISBN 88-7188-084-6.
- Longrigg, Clare (1998). Mafia Women. London: Vintage. ISBN 0-09-959171-5.
