= La sfida =

- Directed by: Francesco Rosi
- Written by: Suso Cecchi d'Amico; Enzo Provenzale; Francesco Rosi
- Starring: José Suárez; Rosanna Schiaffino
- Music by: Roman Vlad
- Release date: 6 September 1958 (Italy)
- Countries: Italy; Spain

La sfida ("the challenge") is a 1958 Italian film by Francesco Rosi. It stars José Suárez as a gang leader who challenges a local Camorra boss for supremacy. It won the Jury Prize at the Venice Film Festival.

The film is based on the real-life story of Camorra boss Pasquale Simonetti, known as Pasquale 'e Nola, and his wife and former beauty queen Pupetta Maresca, played by Rosanna Schiaffino.

It was produced by the Italian companies Cinecittà and Vides Cinematografica and the Spanish companies Lux Film and Suevia Films.
