= Umberto Ammaturo =

Italian criminal

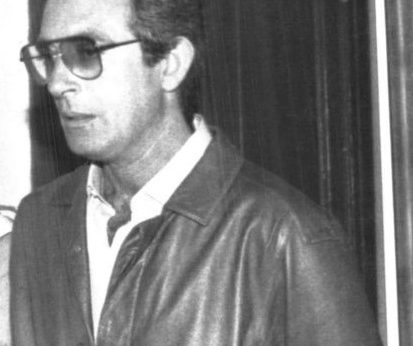
- Born: May 21, 1941 (age 85); Naples, Campania, Italy
- Other names: 'O Pazzo ("The mad one")
- Known for: High ranking member of the Nuova Famiglia (formerly)
- Children: 2
- Allegiance: Camorra (formerly)
- Accomplice: Pupetta Maresca

Umberto Ammaturo (Italian pronunciation: [umˈbɛrto ammaˈtuːro]; born May 21, 1941), also known as 'o pazzo ("the mad one"), is an Italian former criminal and a member of the Neapolitan Camorra, a Mafia-type organisation in Italy. He specialized in cocaine trafficking from South America. He was included in the list of most wanted fugitives in Italy until his capture in May 1993. A month later he decided to become a pentito, a state witness breaking omertà, or code of silence.

== Early life and start of criminal career ==
Ammaturo was born in a large Neapolitan family. His father ran a wine business that suffered economic difficulties. On top of that, his mother died when Umberto was just seven years old, leaving his father to look after seven small children. Streetwise and intelligent, young Umberto learned crime as a street urchin (guaglione). A petty criminal in the mid-1950s, he evolved into a cigarette smuggler in the 1960s. He was active in Santa Lucia, the seafront area in Naples.

Ammaturo was related to Felice Malvento (his brother Antonio was married to Luisa Malvento), a cigarette smuggler with contacts to Sicilian mafiosi such as Tommaso Buscetta. He was first arrested in 1962. In 1965, the handsome Ammaturo met Pupetta Maresca a former beauty queen who had made international headlines in the 1950s when she killed in revenge the murderer of her husband, a Camorra boss named Pasquale Simonetti. She had met a lot of sympathy among ordinary Neapolitans for her deed. Maresca bore him twins.

Ammaturo received serious police attention when he was arrested again in 1972 with Nunzio Guida, the Camorra's leader in Milan. In 1974 he was caught smuggling cocaine through the diplomatic bag of the consul of Panama with Aniello Nuvoletta. Two years later he feigned to be ill with cancer and was sent to a hospital from which he escaped.

== Camorra war against Cutolo ==
During the war in 1980-1983 between the Nuova Camorra Organizzata (NCO) headed by Raffaele Cutolo, and the Nuova Famiglia (NF) headed by Carmine Alfieri, Ammaturo and Maresca sided with the NF, in particular with Antonio Bardellino of the Casalesi clan, against Cutolo's NCO. Bardellino and Ammaturo were involved in many murders of members of the NCO.

In 1982, Ammaturo and Maresca were arrested and charged with killing the forensic psychiatrist Aldo Semerari, who had helped Ammaturo escape prison in previous years by teaching him to feign insanity. Ammaturo managed to escape to Africa and then to South America, while Maresca remained in Italy to face the charges. She would serve four years in prison from 1982 to 1986. She and Ammaturo were acquitted on appeal in 1989 for lack of evidence. Ammaturo confessed the murder when he decided to become a state witness (pentito) in June 1993.

While free and provided with a new identity in exchange for his testimonies, he admitted to killing Semerari and personally decapitating him in a rare interview with La Repubblica newspaper in May 2010. In exchange for financial support, Semerari offered psychiatric evaluations to members of various criminal organizations, most notably the Camorra and Banda della Magliana. He had made deals with both Raffaele Cutolo's NCO, as well as with the NF. Ammaturo considered him to be a traitor siding with the enemy in their fierce criminal war.

== Cocaine baron ==
Contrary to conventional Camorra bosses Ammaturo remained a loner. He had no specific territory, no crime family and specialised entirely in cocaine trafficking, above all with Bardellino. The drug trade gave him wealth and power, although he lacked social control and even less political influence in Italy.

In the 1980s, Ammaturo established a virtual monopoly of cocaine trafficking to Italy from Peru, where he benefited from the protection and collusion of important personalities. The particular success of Ammaturo was the result of his innovation to set up a triangular system of cocaine smuggling, involving several African countries as staging posts, rather than just using the traditional South American-European axis. He diversified his interests on a global scale, buying a tourist centre in Senegal through a Swiss bank account. According to the DEA, due to his trafficking activities, Ammaturo was one of the chief financiers of the Shining Path guerrilla movement in Peru.

In 1987, he evaded prison for the third time and moved to South America. In August 1990, he was arrested in Governador Valadares near Belo Horizonte (Brazil), and spent three months in jail in Brasília awaiting extradition. However, he managed to escape, after paying some US$100,000 in bribes and was flown to Peru.

In March 1992, nine of his associates were arrested following the discovery of 10 kg of cocaine which had arrived from Colombia. The cocaine was soaked into clothes which were then smeared with solvents to distract sniffer dogs; the clothes would then be treated in Castellamare di Stabia and the cocaine reconstituted. A drug smuggling operation of an even bigger scale was discovered in July 1992, involving the importation of 300 kg of cocaine from Colombia via Peru.

== Arrest and repentance ==
Ammaturo moved to Peru and was arrested again on May 3, 1993, in Lima, and extradited to Italy. In June 1993, he decided to collaborate with the Italian justice system and became a pentito, breaking the omertà, or code of silence. In retaliation his brother Antonio was killed. His testimony resulted in 40 arrests in May 1994, amongst them Michele Zaza and Luigi Giuliano.

Ammaturo entered the witness protection program and was provided with a new identity. His properties were seized.

== Books ==
- Allum, Felia Skyle (2000), The Neapolitan Camorra: Crime and politics in post-war Naples (1950-92), Brunel University
- Behan, Tom (1996). The Camorra, London: Routledge, ISBN 0-415-09987-0
- Longrigg, Clare (1998). Mafia Women, London: Vintage ISBN 0-09-959171-5
