= La famiglia Benvenuti =

- La Domenica del Corriere: Italians see themselves in the Benvenuti family
- Genre: Comedy
- Created by: Alfredo Giannetti
- Starring: Enrico Maria Salerno; Valeria Valeri; Valerio Fioravanti; Massimo Farinelli; Claudio Gora; Milly; Marina Coffa; Leopoldo Trieste; Giulio Platone; Gina Sammarco; Jole Fierro
- Country of origin: Italy
- No. of seasons: 2
- No. of episodes: 13

Production
- Running time: 60 minutes

Original release
- Network: Rai 1
- Release: 1968 – 1970

La famiglia Benvenuti (literally "The Benvenuti Family") is an Italian comedy television series that originally ran on RAI from 1968 to 1970. Two seasons were produced: the first shot in black and white, the second, experimentally, was instead made in color, although the RAI had not yet adopted this technique (the color broadcasts officially started only eight years later).

== Cast ==
- Enrico Maria Salerno
- Valeria Valeri
- Valerio Fioravanti
- Massimo Farinelli
- Claudio Gora
- Milly
- Marina Coffa
- Leopoldo Trieste
- Giulio Platone

== See also ==
- List of Italian television series
