= Pietro Musumeci =

Pietro Musumeci (born 18 May 1920) is a former general and deputy director of Italy's military intelligence agency, SISMI.

== Secret service career ==
Musumeci was born in Catania. A member of Propaganda Due, he was reported to have links with the 'black' neo-fascist terrorist organisation Nuclei Armati Rivoluzionari (NAR), maintaining contact with Massimo Carminati, one of the NAR's leading figures.

In January 1981, Musumeci was involved in a plot to sidetrack investigations into the 1980 Bologna train station bombing by simulating an attempt with explosives on a Taranto-Milan train, which included leaving behind a suitcase containing hoax documents (although he called a halt to the bombing). A few months earlier, he had produced a false dossier, Terror on Trains, which similarly aimed to mislead official enquiries by attributing responsibility for the Bologna bombing to foreign terrorists such as the French neo-Nazi group FANE and Basque separatist organisations.

For these actions, Musumeci was convicted in 1985 of embezzlement and criminal association, alongside two other SISMI officers, Francesco Pazienza and Giuseppe Belmonte. Musumeci and Belmonte were also convicted of possessing and transporting explosives. A further conviction came in 1988, when Musumeci was sentenced for slandering said investigation. Although acquitted on appeal, the sentence was upheld by the Italian Supreme Court in 1995.

A 1984 parliamentary inquiry indicated that irregularities at SISMI included the charge that Musumeci used the Camorra to negotiate the release of Ciro Cirillo, a Christian-democratic politician who was kidnapped by the Red Brigades.

One of the members of Musumeci's office, Colonel Camillo Guglielmi, was in the same street (Via Fani) in which former Italian prime minister Aldo Moro was kidnapped, on 16 March 1978.
