= Valerio Fioravanti =

Italian convicted terrorist (born 1958)

- Born: Giuseppe Valerio Fioravanti; 28 March 1958 (age 68); Rovereto, Italy
- Occupations: Actor; journalist
- Years active: 1962–1975
- Height: 1.73 m (5 ft 8 in)
- Partner: Francesca Mambro

Giuseppe Valerio Fioravanti (born 28 March 1958) is an Italian terrorist and actor, who was a leading figure in the far-right Nuclei Armati Rivoluzionari (Armed Revolutionary Nuclei, or NAR). Fioravanti appeared in films and television at a young age, and was considered the most famous child in Italy. He and Francesca Mambro were fugitives wanted for terrorist offences by their early twenties, and went on the run as suspects in the Bologna bombing. Both were captured after gunfights with police, and later found guilty. They were sentenced to ten life sentences plus 250 years. Fioravanti was released from prison in 2009; Mambro was released in 2013.

== Biography ==
=== Background ===
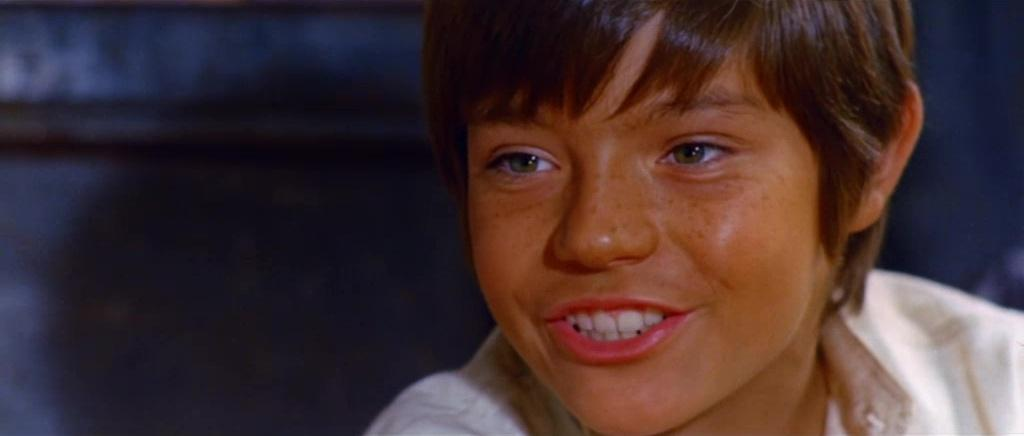
Valerio Fioravanti in The Reward's Yours... The Man's Mine

Fioravanti was born in Rovereto to a Roman family, his father was a television presenter. As a child actor, Fioravanti starred in a popular series of the 1960s, La famiglia Benvenuti, with Enrico Maria Salerno and Valeria Valeri playing his parents. Fioravanti's younger brother Cristiano had joined a far right youth section aged 13; he acquired a reputation for relishing violent confrontations with leftists. According to Fioravanti, his original motivation for associating with far right militants was not political, but a desire to protect his brother. Fioravanti's parents tried get him away from the escalating violence by sending him to study in the US for a year, he returned to make his last film, which was released in 1975. In early 1977, he was charged with assault, and given 40 days in jail for possession of a pistol. Fioravanti abandoned university studies to join a paratroop unit of the Italian army; he was repeatedly punished for disciplinary infractions. After a crate of hand grenades was stolen while he was on guard duty, Fioravanti was court-martialed for leaving his post and sentenced to several months in a military prison.

Francesca Mambro was the daughter of a policeman (who died in 1979), and from a relatively modest background. She met Fioravanti at a far right university club. As activists for the Italian Social Movement, they were targeted by political opponents as fascists (Fioravanti himself rejected the label). In a 1997 interview, Mambro said she identified with far right wing youth as underdogs who tended to be on the receiving end of violence. Some of her friends died, including a young Social Movement protester who Mambro saw being shot dead by a Carabinieri captain during disturbances that followed the Acca Larentia killings. The incident alienated Fioravanti's associates, and led to riots during which some Italian Social Movement youths shot at police. Mambro later said the experience made her decide to carry a gun, although her personal involvement with Fioravanti played a major part in her taking up terrorism.

=== Armed Revolutionary Nuclei ===
It is believed that at some point Mambro devised the name Nuclei Armati Rivoluzionari, but the group was anti-authoritarian and was never formally structured.

==== Ideology ====
The late seventies were a time of political violence in the form of bombings, assassinations, and street warfare between rival militant factions. Fioravanti was one of a number of teenage activists in Rome who saw the state-sanctioned far-right political party as betraying them, through inaction in the face of attacks by political opponents and the police. Influenced by leftist movements, a large group of far right youths, including Fioravanti and his close associates, moved from street-fighting to terrorism. Unlike their left-wing counterparts, they emphasised personal qualities like spontaneity and willingness to fight, even in a lost cause, over political objectives. Fioravanti has said, "About defeat we never cared, we are a generation of losers, always on the side of the defeated." Italy was seen as a 'sick', unjust and repressive state. In a 2005 interview, Fioravanti characterized this former rationale for terrorist activities as 'total stupidity', and said 'exultation and rage' in his milieu had fed a collective delusion.

==== Personnel ====
The original core members consisted of those close to Fioravanti: Franco Anselmi, magistrate's son Alessandro Alibrandi and Fioravanti's brother Cristiano. Two of the most active terrorists, Gilberto Cavallini, who was a fugitive, and 17-year-old Luigi Ciavardini, became part of the core group after the first armed actions. Others were the part-Eritrean George Vale and Massimo Carminati (later to become a major figure in the Italian underworld). Mambro became active in NAR violence and romantically involved with Fioravanti during 1979. Testimony at their trial described the couple as "always together".

Fioravanti was a good friend of Carminati, and through him, he was introduced to some members of Rome's dominant criminal gang members, including Massimo Sparti, who became close to Cristiano. Their anti-hierarchical ethos precluded any formal leader, though Fioravanti was the main organizer. He anticipated others would be drawn to emulate NAR, and that other cells would spring up spontaneously, as they shifted to taking action irrespective of the consequences. Fioravanti advocated small, fast-moving groups, as he intended the name "Armed Revolutionary Nuclei" to be adopted by largely independent cells.

==== Armed violence ====
Fioravanti was doing military service when the first killing occurred, it is believed to have been committed by either Cristiano or Alibrandi in September 1977; a leftist militant was shot dead. The victims of Armed Revolutionary Nuclei that followed included several policemen (this was justified on the grounds of them being 'thugs and torturers'), comrades suspected of treachery, and investigating magistrates including Mario Amato. Fioravanti was 23, and Mambro 21, when warrants charged them with the Bologna massacre bombing of 2 August 1980, which killed 85 people and both Fioravanti and Mambro were subsequently convicted of.

===== Capture =====
In February 1981, police surprised members of Armed Revolutionary Nuclei as they were retrieving weapons cached in the Bacchiglione river on the outskirts of Padua. In the shooting that followed, two policemen were killed and Fioravanti was badly wounded in the legs; he was arrested later the same day. His brother Cristiano was tracked down two months later through telegrams he had sent his girlfriend. He quickly collaborated to provide police with a thorough account of NAR activities, and was released under a new identity after a year. The remaining group of NAR fugitives did not regard Mambro as a leader, she played a traditional female role by trying to keep life serene. In March 1982, she was shot and critically wounded while taking part in a bank robbery during which a bystander was killed. According to Mambro, accomplices had openly toyed with the idea of coup de grâce rather than letting the police capture and interrogate her, but it was eventually decided to leave her at a hospital, where she was arrested.

== Bologna massacre investigation ==
The bombing was quickly attributed to neofascists by the authorities; in late August 1980, the prosecutor of Bologna had ordered the arrest of 28 people on charges of subversive association, including Fioravanti (who was already a fugitive with Mambro) and far right ideologue Stefano Delle Chiaie and his associate Pierluigi Pagliai who were in Bolivia. Pagliai was fatally wounded during an attempt to bring him back to Italy.

=== Propaganda Due ===
An informer, later found to be unreliable, claimed that Delle Chiaie was involved in Bologna, and that the bombing had been commissioned by a Masonic lodge made up of Italy's government, media and security services elite. In the aftermath of the bombing, Licio Gelli, of Masonic lodge Propaganda Due, said a conspiracy of far rightists and foreigners had carried it out. On 13 January 1981, fabricated evidence, implicating Terza Posizione, along with French and German right-wing extremists, was planted on a train; General Pietro Musumeci of SISMI was later charged with ordering the deception. Gelli was charged with slandering the investigation into the massacre; some suspected he was deeply involved in the bombing itself. Further complicating police enquiries were allegations that Fioravanti had carried out killings for Propaganda Due.

=== Strategy of tension ===
Bologna was a prosperous stronghold of the Communist Party; it had suffered prior terrorist attacks, starting in 1969. A theory thought plausible by Italians of a Left Wing identification posited an alliance of the American CIA and Italian Deep State officials concentrated in the P2 Freemasonry lodge, using terrorism in a Strategy of tension to force a 'drift to the right' for 'public safety', and associate the Left parties with chaos in order to nullify their growing popularity. Operation Gladio, a NATO secret project to be activated in the event of a Soviet "conquest" of Europe came under grave suspicion. Some suspected that explosives used in the Bologna bombing had been taken from Operation Gladio arms caches. The prosecution at Fioravanti's trial alleged he obtained explosive material by scuba diving on a sunken WW2 Italian warship and taking recovered anti-aircraft shells apart to extract the propellant.

=== Link to Perugia trial of Andreotti ===
A clandestine weapons store of the Banda della Magliana criminal organization was kept in the basement of a government building, the NAR had access to it, and ammunition thought likely to have come from the joint arms cache was used to kill Carmine Pecorelli in 1979. In 1993, contemporaneously with his trial for Mafia association in Palermo, former Italian prime minister Giulio Andreotti, along with Fioravanti's mobster friend Massimo Carminati, were charged with the murder of Pecorelli by prosecutors in Perugia. The case was circumstantial, and based on the word of Mafia turncoat Tommaso Buscetta, who had not originally mentioned the allegation about Andreotti when interviewed by Giovanni Falcone. Andreotti was acquitted along with his co-defendants in 1999. The prosecution successfully appealed the acquittal. A retrial was held, which in 2002, convicted Andreotti and sentenced him to 24 years' imprisonment. Italians of all political allegiances denounced the conviction. The Italian supreme court finally cleared Andreotti of the murder in 2003.

=== Fioravanti and Mambro's denials ===
In denying involvement in the Bologna massacre, Mambro later insisted that, far from being a well-supplied tool of hidden forces, Armed Revolutionary Nuclei were regarded as 'snotty kids' by the established leaders of neofascism, and the group never had access to explosives in the quantity that the Bologna bomb used. She also said that Armed Revolutionary Nuclei had never deliberately targeted ordinary people. Fioravanti has said that the 1980 Bologna train station bombing was the work of Libya, and that the Italian state had been reluctant to pursue that line of enquiry because of dependence on Libya's oil, and thus blamed neo-fascists.

==== Trial ====
The trial began in January 1987; there were 20 defendants. For the first time since Fioravanti's arrest he and Mambro were reunited when they were placed together in the cage Italian courtrooms have for those accused of violent crimes. They pleaded guilty to responsibility for numerous murders, but denied they or their group carried out the Bologna massacre. The prosecution said that Fioravanti had admitted to crimes which demonstrated an indiscriminate ruthlessness, and that he had espoused an ideology that justified attacks similar to Bologna, as had Mambro.

The crucial evidence against Fioravanti and Mambro in the Bologna bombing was given by a witness some thought untrustworthy: small-time criminal and Banda della Magliana member Massimo Sparti. He alleged that, two days after the blast, Fioravanti had come to him to obtain false documents, and said he worried someone might recognize Mambro from the station. The testimony contained inconsistencies; Sparti was released from prison in 1982, ostensibly because of terminal cancer, although he was still alive 15 years later.

Fioravanti's alibi for the morning of 2 August was weakened by its lack of precision: he had initially said he was in Treviso, but subsequently asserted he had travelled with Mambro and Ciavardini to a meeting in Padova early that day. Cristiano and another NAR member became prosecution witnesses: both recalled that, days after the bombing, Mambro had worried about being accused of the massacre, spoke of being in Padova at the time of the explosion, and expressed concern about them being believed.

In July 1988, Fioravanti and Mambro were found guilty of responsibility for the Bologna train bombing, as well as for the crimes they admitted; they were sentenced to ten life terms, plus 250 years. Massimiliano Fachini and Sergio Picciafuoco were also given life sentences for the bombing. Several NAR members were given prison sentences for being members of an illegal armed group. At the same trial, Gelli and General Pietro Musumeci were convicted of offences not directly related to the massacre. Delle Chiaie was acquitted of subversive association.

In 1990, an appeal acquitted all four of those convicted of responsibility for the bombing, but Fioravanti and Mambro were again prosecuted and convicted: in 1995, a final judgement by the Supreme Court confirmed their earlier convictions and sentences. After a series of separate trials, in 2007, Ciavardini was also convicted of responsibility for the Bologna bombing. Protestations of innocence from all three won them a measure of support from some politicians, jurists and academics.

===== Imprisonment =====
Mambro was ostracised in prison. Fellow prisoner Anna Laura Braghetti, serving time for Red Brigades terrorism, was sympathetic and befriended her, later becoming Mambro's cellmate.

In 1985, Fioravanti and Mambro were married while serving their sentences. In 1997, the Venice Film Festival debuted a documentary of Fioravanti's on Rome's Rebibbia prison, Piccoli Ergastoli ("Little Life Sentences").

===== Release =====
Despite continuing to deny responsibility for the Bologna massacre, both were given day release from the prison. Mambro worked outside at an anti-death penalty organisation from 1998; her daughter with Fioravanti was born two years later, and Mambro was conditionally released in 2002. Fioravanti was given day release from 2000, and conditionally released in 2004. The conditions ended in 2009. Fioravanti and Mambro have repudiated and expressed regret for their admitted terrorist activities, and continue to maintain they had no involvement in the Bologna station bombing.

== Later life ==
Fioravanti is currently a contributing writer for Il Riformista focusing on human rights and the criminal justice system in Iran and the United States. His articles are dedicated to Hands off Cain, a non-profit organization that supports the abolition of the death penalty and torture worldwide.

== Filmography ==
- Boccaccio '70, episode "Le Tentazioni del Dottor Antonio", directed by Federico Fellini (1962) (cupid, uncredited)
- Cjamango, directed by Edoardo Mulargia (1967)
- Vanity Fair, directed by Anton Giulio Majano (1967) - TV drama
- The Benvenuti Family, directed by Alfredo Giannetti (1968–69) - TV series
- The Discovery, directed by Elio Piccon (1969)
- Hate is my God, directed by Claudio Gora (1969)
- The Reward's Yours... The Man's Mine, directed by Edoardo Mulargia (1969)
- Shango, the infallible gun, directed by Edoardo Mulargia (1970)
- Grazie... nonna, directed by Marino Girolami (1975)

== Bibliography ==
- Questi benedetti genitori... Un libro per bambini che possono leggere anche i grandi (1969 – English translation: These blessed parents ... A book for children that even grown-ups can read, 1969)
