= Francesca Mambro =

Former far-right Italian terrorist

Francesca Mambro (born 25 April 1959) is an Italian activist and terrorist, who was a leading member of the far-right Italian Armed Revolutionary Nuclei (NAR). She was arrested in Rome in March 1982 as a suspect in the Bologna bombing of August 1980. Mambro was tried and found guilty of the bombing, charges totalling 96 murders. She was sentenced to nine life sentences, or 84 years' imprisonment. Mambro was paroled in 2013 and her sentence expired five years later.

== Early life ==
Mambro was born on 25 April 1959 in Chieti, the only daughter of four children (her brothers were Mariano, Mario and Italo). Mambro's father was a Marshal of Public Security. Her family moved to Rome when she was young, dwelling near Piazza Bologna. Mambro attended a magistral school.

== Far-right politics ==
Mambro became politically active while attending the lyceum, and later joined the Italian Social Movement, first in its youth section and later graduating to the FUAN, where she worked at the organisation's headquarters in Via Siena. Mambro was also a member of Lotta Popolare, at the time headed by Teodoro Buontempo and Paolo Signorelli. The historian Andrea Colombo has suggested that the formative event of Mambro's youth was the Acca Larentia killings of 7 January 1978, which, he says, encouraged many MSI activists to take up armed struggle. She joined the Revolutionary Armed Groups—then led by Valerio Fioravanti—whom she had previously met when they were both children. The two soon began a relationship. Riccardo Bocca describes the couple thus:

"He, already a fugitive, goes to see her in the hospital where she is awaiting an operation, then they start meeting in a garden near the house where she works as a baby sitter. It does not take long because a mutual attraction—already long-standing—coupled with a political affinity that according to Francesca is as much a determinant as the attraction itself, brought them together. And it is equally obvious that the impetuous girl should take the first step".

One of Mambro's first acts with the group was on 7 March 1979—the night before the anniversary of International Women's Day—when she placed a homemade bomb in the Prati district of Rome; Fioravanti, with a number of others, covered her. On 30 March the following year, Mambro, Fioravanti and others attacked and robbed a Paduan army base, in which they stole machine guns, automatic rifles, pistols and ammunition. As they escaped, Mambro shot the letters "BR" onto the barrack's wall in order to confuse any subsequent police investigation. Two months later Mambro was part of the unit which shot and killed a policeman—another was injured—on an attack outside a high school in Rome.

She murdered 26 year old Captain Francesco Straullu, a law enforcement agent investigating the far right in Italy in October 1981, publicly declaring:

We are not interested in seizing power nor in educating the masses. What counts for us is our ethic, to kill Enemies and to annihilate traitors. The will to fight keeps us going from day to day, the thirst for revenge is our food ... We are not afraid to die nor to end our days in jail; our only fear is not to be able to clean up everything and everybody.

On 5 March 1982, during a shootout with police following a robbery of the Banca Nazionale del Lavoro in Rome, Mambro was shot in the groin and seriously injured. She was taken to the emergency room at Santo Spirito hospital; she survived her injuries but was arrested there.

== Arrest, trial and imprisonment ==
The Bologna bombing had taken place on 2 August 1980. Following their arrest in 1982 Mambro and Fioravanti were tried and sentenced to life imprisonment. Mambro continued to claim her innocence of the bombing, suggesting that, on account of the number of other murders she confessed to — for which she would have received a similar sentence — she had no reason to lie. Mambro was charged with a total of 96 murders (including 85 in Bologna), as well as theft, illegal possession of weaponry, housebreaking, kidnapping, subversive association, terrorist activities, and conspiracy.

In 1985 she married Valerio Fioravanti, her partner of the previous decade and with whom she had a daughter in 2001. Mambro, along with Fioravanti, took moral responsibility for the acts of the NAR, but rejected the notion of involvement in the Bologna bombing generally and specifically of killing Alessandro Caravillani, a seventeen-year-old high school student killed on 5 March 1982 in a shootout between the group of fleeing terrorists and the police. In 2000, Mambro was ordered to pay over €2,134,273,000 (1970962400 dollars) in compensation. Although she was nominally to pay the Presidency of the Council and the Ministry of the Interior, commentators assumed this would never be paid, as Mambro had insufficient funds.

== Prison release ==
Mambro was paroled in 2013 and her sentence officially expired five years later. In 2015, the Undersecretary for Justice, Cosimo Maria Ferri commented that Mambro had been kept under observation for the duration of her sentence and this had persuaded the government that she had demonstrated a "certain repentance". Along with Fioravanti, since the early nineties, she has collaborated with Hands Off Cain, the association against the death penalty linked to the Radical Party.

== See also ==
- Years of lead (Italy)
- Neo-fascism
- Mario Amato
