= Young Italy (1954) =

Young Italy Giovane Italia
- President: Fabio De Felice
- Secretary General: Massimo Anderson
- Founded: 1954
- Dissolved: 1971
- Succeeded by: Youth Front
- Ideology: National conservatism Italian nationalism Neo-fascism
- Mother party: Italian Social Movement

Young Italy (Italian: Giovane Italia) was the youth wing of the Italian Social Movement from 1954 to 1971.

== History ==
At the Rome conference, which sanctioned the foundation of Young Italy as an autonomous national body, albeit linked to the Italian Social Movement and in which over 200 young people representing the provincial associations set up in the various regions participate, Massimo Anderson was elected first Secretary General and Fabio De Felice was elected president.

In 1971, Anderson and Pietro Cerullo brought together Young Italy and the Students and Workers Youth Rally in a new political entity called Youth Front, with Anderson as secretary and Cerullo as president.

== Ideology ==
According to Evola, the concept of life provided was "spiritualistic" and contrasted with the "materialist" one of Marxism.

== National secretaries ==
- Fabio De Felice (1954–1955)
- Angelo Nicosia (1955–1957)
- Fausto Gianfranceschi (1957–1966)
- Massimo Anderson (1966–1969)
- Pietro Cerullo (1969–1971)
