= Pupetta Maresca =

Italian criminal (1935–2021)

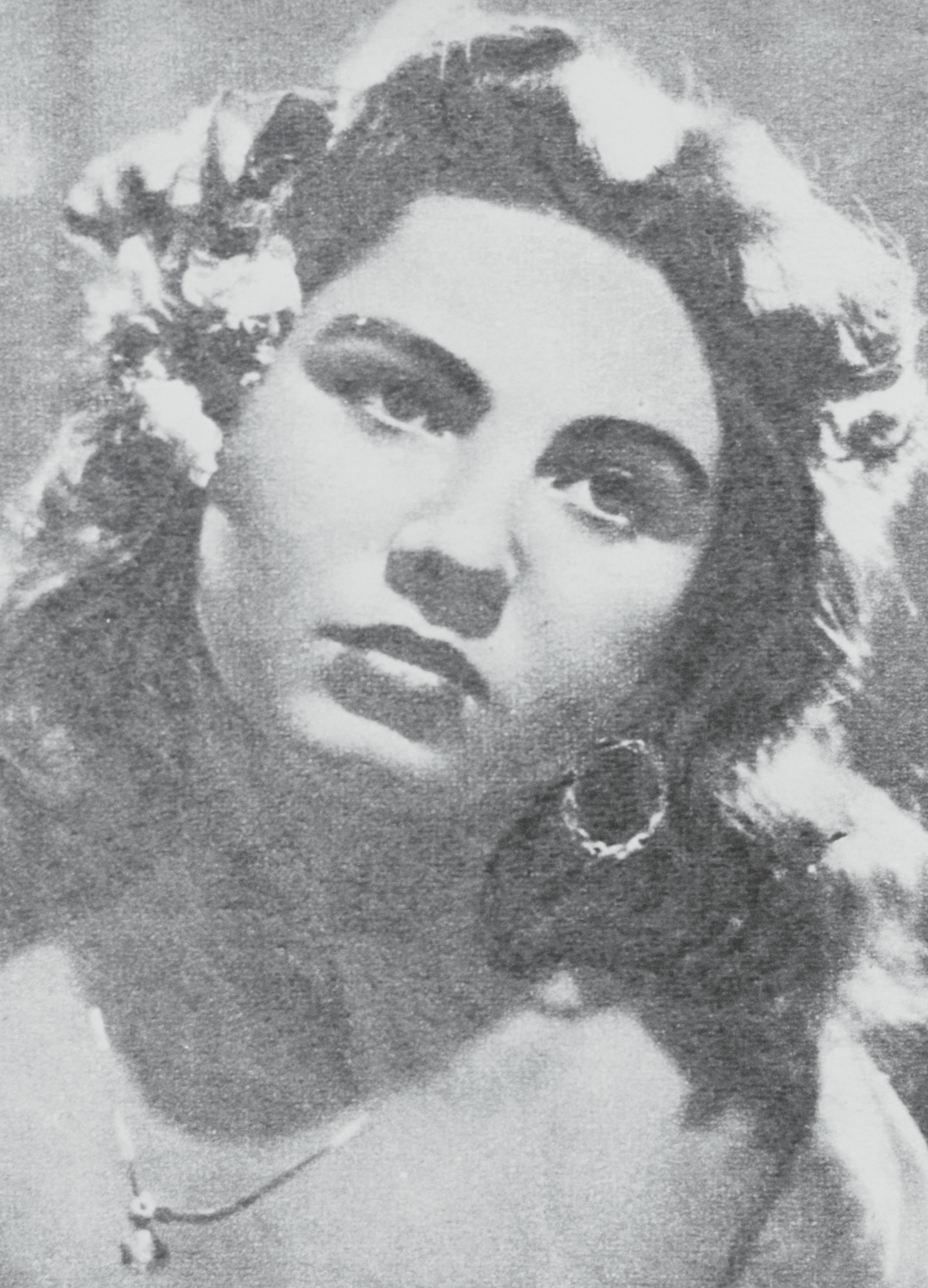
- Studio portrait of young Maresca taken when she was a local beauty queen ca. 1954
- Born: Assunta Maresca; 19 January 1935; Castellamare di Stabia, Campania, Italy
- Died: 29 December 2021 (aged 86); Castellamare di Stabia, Campania, Italy
- Spouse: Pasquale Simonetti (m. 1955; died 1955)
- Children: 3
- Allegiance: Camorra
- Criminal charges: Murder
- Penalty: 18 years of imprisonment, later reduced to 13 years and 4 months
- Accomplice: Umberto Ammaturo

Assunta "Pupetta" Maresca (19 January 1935 – 29 December 2021) was an Italian criminal who was a well-known figure in the Camorra. She made international newspaper headlines in the mid-1950s when she killed the murderer of her husband in revenge.

== Early life ==
Assunta Maresca was born in Castellamare di Stabia, a town south of Naples in Campania. She was the only daughter and had four brothers. Her father, Alberto Maresca, was a dangerous smuggler. Her uncle, Vincenzo Maresca, sentenced to seven years in prison for the murder of his brother Gerardo, was a known Camorrista who controlled their hometown. The Maresca family was known as the "Lightning Knives" (Italian: Lampetielli) for their expert use of switchblades, and made their money in contraband cigarettes. Tiny, pretty, and spoiled, she was nicknamed Pupetta ("little doll"). At the age of 19, she won a local beauty contest and became Miss Rovegliano, a suburban village of Naples.

Maresca was courted by a wealthy and powerful local guappo, or Camorra boss, from Palma Campania. Another suitor was Pasquale Simonetti, known as Pasquale 'e Nola, who worked in the fruit and vegetable market in Naples and dealt in smuggled goods. On 27 April 1955, they married.

== Revenge killing ==
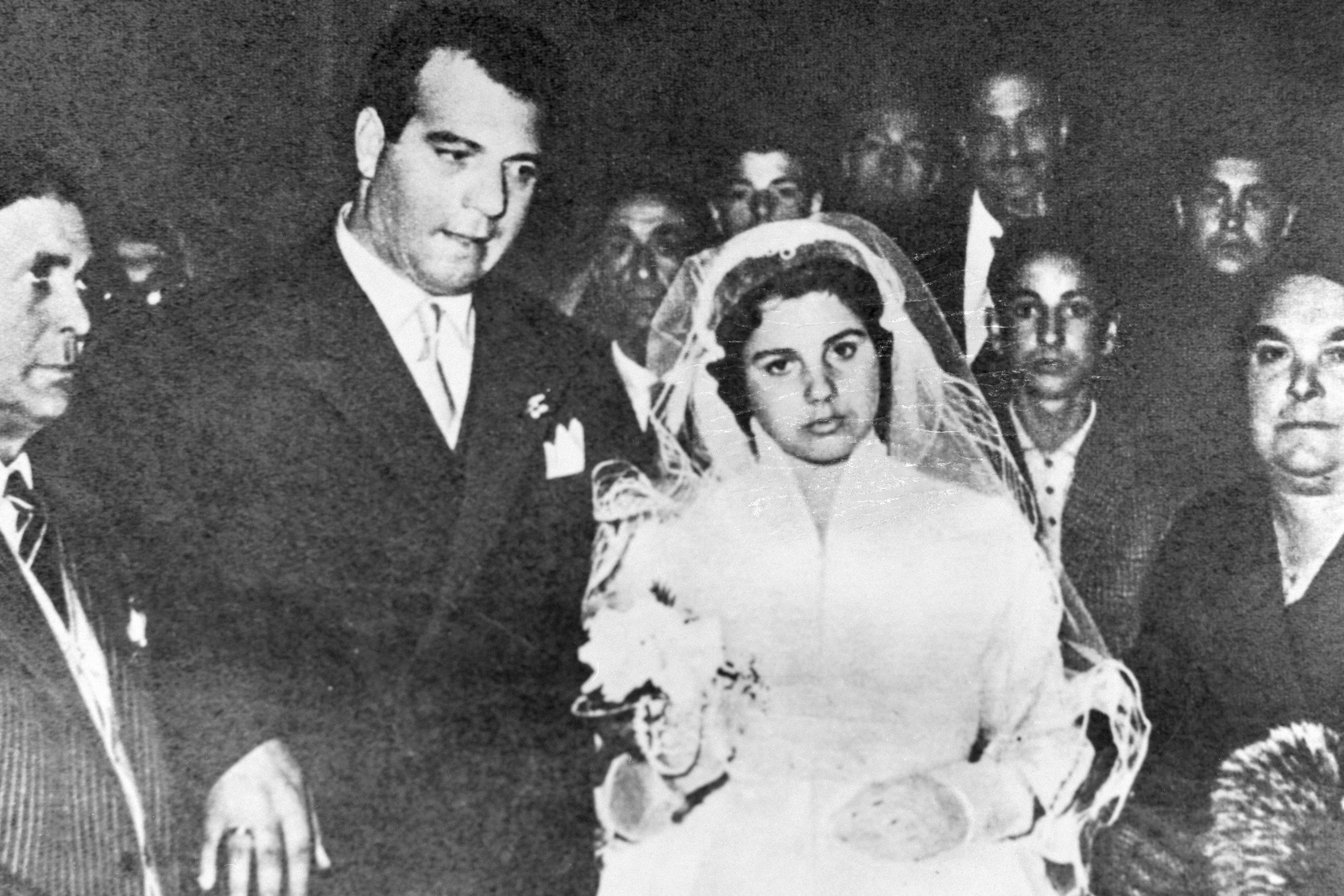
Pupetta Maresca and Pasquale Simonetti wedding photo (1955)

Simonetti's style and power bothered other Camorristi. On 16 July 1955 in Naples, he was shot dead in a central square of Naples by Gaetano Orlando, a hitman commissioned by rival Camorrista Antonio Esposito. The six-months-pregnant Maresca was devastated. She believed the police knew who the perpetrator was but were not prepared to do anything about it. On 4 August 1955, she drove to Naples with her younger brother, Ciro. When they met Esposito, she reached into her handbag and pulled out a Smith & Wesson .38. Holding it with both hands ("I was afraid I would miss", she explained later), she opened fire, firing 29 bullets and killing Esposito in broad daylight.

On 14 October 1955, Maresca was arrested. Her trial started in April 1959 at the Court of Assizes in Naples. The killing and the following trial made international headlines. At the trial, she defiantly declared, "I would do it again!" and the whole courtroom burst into cheers.

One newspaper called her "The Diva of Crime". For the first time, the Court in Naples permitted microphones to be used so that the crowds could hear the proceedings. Proposals of marriage flooded in, and one musician composed a song in Pupetta's honour called "La legge d'onore" – the Law of Honour. Nevertheless, she was sentenced to 18 years' imprisonment, later reduced to 13 years and 4 months by the Court of Appeal.

== Madame Camorra ==
Maresca gave birth to her first child, Pasquale, in prison. She was pardoned in 1965, but "Madame Camorra", as she was dubbed, continued to be involved in criminal activities. She became the lover of yet another Camorra boss, the drug baron Umberto Ammaturo, and gave birth to twins. She supported his criminal business. In 1974, Pasquale was abducted and murdered at the age of 18. His death remained unsolved, but Maresca believed that Ammaturo was responsible; he denied knowing anything about Pasquale's death. Pasquale had not accepted his mother's relationship with Ammaturo, who had threatened Pasquale several times. Ammaturo, suspected of the murder, was later acquitted for lack of evidence.

Maresca separated from Ammaturo in 1982 and continued her involvement with the Camorra. In February 1982, during the war between the Nuova Camorra Organizzata (NCO) and the Nuova Famiglia (NF), she held a press conference to defend her men, publicly defying the NCO boss Raffaele Cutolo. Cutolo had imposed a 'tax' on every case of smuggled cigarettes, a measure the Marescas resisted. Maresca’s favourite brother, Ciro, was shot in 1978. He survived, but was threatened again in prison by Cutolo's men in 1982.

Later in 1982, Maresca and Ammaturo were arrested and charged with extortion as well as the murder of forensic scientist Aldo Semerari. Maresca denied involvement in these crimes for the remainder of her life. By contrast, Ammaturo, who was initially acquitted, later confessed to the murder after becoming a pentito in June 1993. Maresca served four years in prison and then lived alone in Sorrento.

== Later life and death ==
Maresca died on 29 December 2021 at her residence in Castellammare di Stabia, at age 86.

== In popular culture ==
Maresca's life has been the subject of several films, including:

- La sfida (The Challenge; 1958), by Francesco Rosi, based on the story of Pascalone and Pupetta Maresca, with Rosanna Schiaffino as Maresca
- Il caso Pupetta Maresca (1982; TV film), in which she was portrayed by Alessandra Mussolini, a granddaughter of the Fascist leader Benito Mussolini. Maresca, who did not agree with the film, argued that being portrayed by a Mussolini was “an affront to her honour” and was able to prevent its broadcast. Only 12 years later, in 1994, was the film screened on Italian TV channel Rai Tre.

== Sources ==
- Longrigg, Clare (1998). Mafia Women, London: Vintage ISBN 0-09-959171-5
- Fiandaca, Giovanni (ed.) (2007), Women and the Mafia: Female Roles in Organized Crime Structures, New York: Springer ISBN 0-387-36537-0
