= Youth Front (Italy) =

Youth movement of the Italian Social Movement

Youth Front Fronte della Gioventù
- Founded: 1971
- Dissolved: 1996
- Ideology: Neo-fascism; Italian nationalism National conservatism Factions: Third Position; Revolutionary nationalism
- Mother party: Italian Social Movement

The Youth Front (Italian: Fronte della Gioventù, FdG) was the youth wing of the Italian Social Movement from 1971 to 1996.

== History ==
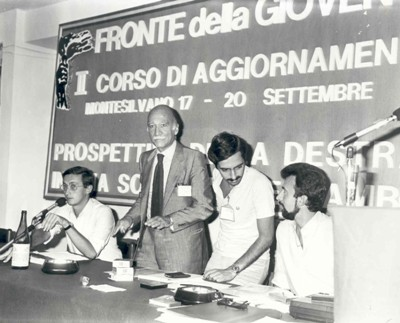
The secretary of the MSI Giorgio Almirante, in the refresher course of the FdG of Montesilvano between Gianfranco Fini (left) and Maurizio Gasparri in September 1981. On the right, in conversation with Gasparri, Almerigo Grilz.

At the beginning of the 1970s, Massimo Anderson and Pietro Cerullo, brought together the main right-wing youth movements of the time, namely the Young Italy and the "Students and Workers Youth Rally", in a new political entity called "Youth Front", with Anderson as secretary and Cerullo as president. The national council of the FdG took office on 6 September 1971.

As for many other organizations of the time that did not have a political line based solely on the institutional sphere, the Youth Front measured itself against the political violence that marked the so-called "Years of Lead". The violent dimension of the political clash that involved the militants of the FdG with the opposing political forces, in particular those of the extra-parliamentary Left, caused the death of many activists on the right and left, including the militants of the FdG killed in the Acca Larentia massacre.

In 1996, after the transformation of the Italian Social Movement into National Alliance, the Youth Front also changed its name and became Youth Action.

== National secretaries ==
- Massimo Anderson (1971–1977)
- Franco Petronio (regent) (1977)
- Gianfranco Fini (1977–1988)
- Gianni Alemanno (1988–1991)
- Riccardo Andriani (1991–1993)
- Giuseppe Scopelliti (1993–1995)
- Regency Committee (1995–1996)
- Basilio Catanoso (1996)

== Notable Members ==
- Giorgia Meloni
- Alessandro Giuli

== See also ==
- Gioventu Nazionale
- Groupe Union Défense
- Federation of Nationalist Students
- FUAN
- Alternative right-wing music (Italy)
- Campo Hobbit
