= Mario Amato =

Mario Amato (24 November 1937, in Palermo – 23 June 1980, in Rome) was an Italian magistrate, assassinated in 1980 by NAR (Nuclei Armati Rivoluzionari) members Gilberto Cavallini and Luigi Ciavardini.

After the assassination of judge Vittorio Occorsio, responsible for investigations into the radical right in Italy, Attorney general Giovanni de Matteo appointed Mario Amato to resume Occorsio's investigations. Despite the dangers inherent in his investigation, Amato was denied the use of an armored car.

At the news of Amato's death, neo-fascists Valerio Fioravanti and Francesca Mambro celebrated the event, according to their own judicial declarations, eating oysters and drinking champagne. Fioravanti and Mambro, both NAR members, received life sentences in 1995 for the 1980 Bologna train-station bombing, while Luigi Ciavardini was condemned in 2007 to a 30-year prison term for his role in the same bombing.
