= Rosanna Schiaffino =

Italian actress (1939–2009)

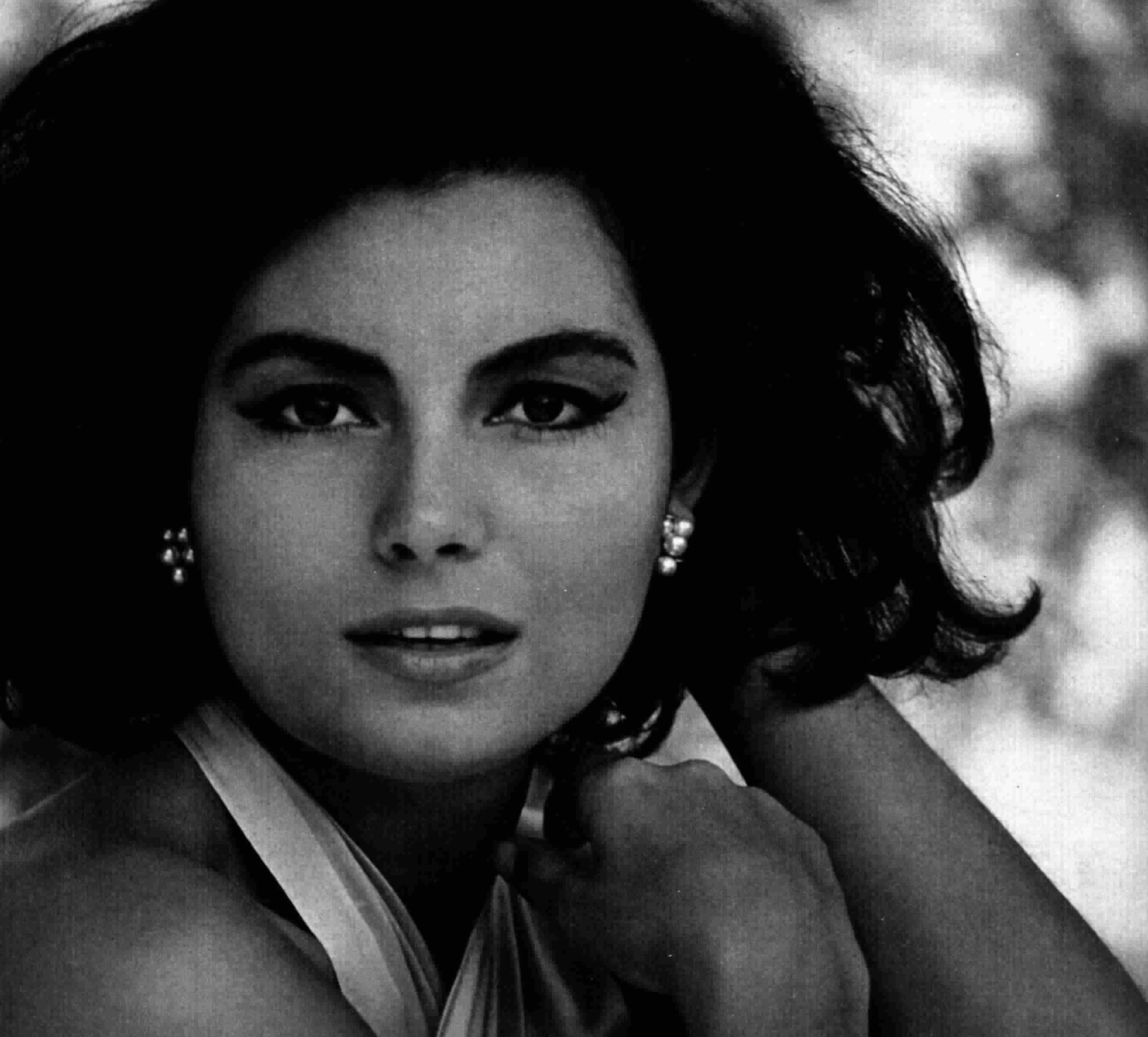
- Born: 25 November 1939; Genoa, Liguria, Italy
- Died: 17 October 2009 (aged 69); Milan, Lombardy, Italy
- Occupation: Actress
- Years active: 1956–1977
- Spouse(s): Giorgio Falck (1982-2001) (divorced, 1 child); Alfredo Bini (1963-1980) (divorced, 1 child)
- Children: Annabella Bini; Guido Falck

Rosanna Schiaffino (25 November 1939 – 17 October 2009) was an Italian film actress. She appeared on the covers of Italian, German, French, British and American magazines.

== Early life ==
She was born in Genoa, Liguria to a well-off family. Her mother encouraged her showbusiness ambitions, helping her to study privately at a drama school. She also took part in beauty contests. When she was 14 she won the Miss Liguria beauty contest, moving into modelling jobs, with photographs in important magazines, including Life.

== Film career ==
She began a promising acting career in the post-neorealist cinema of the 1950s. She was noticed by film producer Franco Cristaldi, who paired her with Marcello Mastroianni in Piece of the Sky in 1959. More important was her second film for him, La sfida (The Challenge), directed by Francesco Rosi, where she made a name for her powerful but sensitive performance as a Neapolitan girl, inspired by the real-life character of Pupetta Maresca. The film was well received at the 1958 Venice Film Festival.

Schiaffino was launched as the "Italian Hedy Lamarr". However, she would have been more appropriately introduced as the new Italian sex goddess after Gina Lollobrigida and Sophia Loren, but in the early 1960s that role was passing to Claudia Cardinale.

She married producer Alfredo Bini in 1966. After several more films, none of them particularly notable, she decided to give up acting. In 1976, she divorced Bini, with whom she had a daughter.

== Jet set ==
Schiaffino began a new life with the jet set. During the summer of 1980, in Portofino, she met the handsome playboy and steel industry heir Giorgio Enrico Falck, who had also just divorced. Their affair was big news for the gossip tabloids.

In 1981 she gave birth to their son, Guido, and in 1982 she married Falck. The marriage and its gradual decline came after she had been diagnosed with breast cancer in 1991, and the couple divorced, leading to unpleasant recriminations over the custody of their son and the inheritance, before they came to an agreement prior to Falck’s demise in 2004.

== Death ==
Rosanna Schiaffino died of cancer on 17 October 2009, aged 69.

== Filmography ==
- Totò, lascia o raddoppia? (1956) - Colomba
- Roland the Mighty (1956) - Angelica / Angélique
- Piece of the Sky (1958) - Marina
- La sfida (1958) - Assunta
- Dubrowsky (1959) - Masha Petrovieh
- Bad Girls Don't Cry (1959) - Rossana
- Ferdinando I, re di Napoli (1959) - Nannina
- Le bal des espions (1960) - Flora
- Minotaur, the Wild Beast of Crete (1960) - Princess Phaedra / Arianna
- La Fayette (1961) - Comtesse de Simiane
- L'onorata società (1961) - Rosaria, the wife
- Le miracle des loups (1961) - Jeanne de Beauvais
- Romulus and the Sabines (1961) - Venere / Venus
- The Italian Brigands (1962) - Mariantonia
- Le Crime ne paie pas (1962) - Francesca Sabelli (segment "Le masque")
- Two Weeks in Another Town (1962) - Barzelli
- Axel Munthe, The Doctor of San Michele (1962) - Antonia
- Ro.Go.Pa.G. (1963) - Anna Maria (segment "Illibatezza")
- The Victors (1963) - Maria
- La corruzione (1963) - Adriana
- The Long Ships (1964) - Aminah
- The Cavern (1964) - Anna
- Red Dragon (1965) - Carol
- The Mandrake (1965) - Lucrezia
- El Greco (1966) - Jeronima de las Cuevas
- La strega in amore (1966) - Aura
- Drop Dead Darling (1966) - Francesca di Rienzi
- The Rover (1967) - Arlette
- Encrucijada para una monja (1967) - Sister Maria
- Simon Bolivar (1969) - Consuelo Hernandez
- Check to the Queen (1969) - Margaret Mevin
- 7 fois... par jour (1971) - Eva
- Trastevere (1971) - Caterina Peretti
- In Love, Every Pleasure Has Its Pain (1971) - Betìa
- Ettore lo fusto (1972) - Elena
- The Heroes (1973) - Katrin, Greek prostitute
- The Man Called Noon (1973) - Fan Davidge
- Silence the Witness (1974) - Luisa Sironi
- The Killer Reserved Nine Seats (1974) - Vivian
- Commissariato di notturna (1974) - Sonia
- Il magnate (1974) - Clelia
- Cagliostro (1975) - Lorenza Balsamo
- La trastienda (1975) - Lourdes
- La ragazza dalla pelle di corallo (1976) - Laura
- Don Giovanni in Sicilia (1977, TV miniseries) - Ninetta (final appearance)
