= Nuclei Armati Rivoluzionari =

Italian neofascist militant organization

- Leader: Valerio Fioravanti
- Dates active: 1977–1981
- Active regions: Italy
- Ideology: Neo-fascism; Third Position
- Political position: Far-right

The Nuclei Armati Rivoluzionari (Italian for 'Armed Revolutionary Nuclei'), abbreviated NAR, was an Italian neo-fascist armed militant organization active during the Years of Lead from 1977 to November 1981. It committed over 100 murders in four years, and had planned to assassinate the politicians Francesco Cossiga, Gianfranco Fini and Adolfo Urso. The group maintained close links with the Banda della Magliana, a Rome-based criminal organization, which provided such logistical support as lodging, false papers, weapons, and bombs to the NAR. In November 1981, it was discovered that the NAR hid weapons in the basements of the Health Ministry. The first trial against them sentenced 53 people in May 1985 on charges of terrorist activities.

== Ideology ==
The late seventies were a time of political violence in the form of bombings, assassinations, and street warfare between rival militant factions. Young neo-fascists saw the state-sanctioned far-right political party MSI as betraying them, through inaction in the face of attacks by political opponents and the police such as the Acca Larentia killings. Influenced by leftist movements, a large group of far-right youths, including Fioravanti and his close associates, moved from street-fighting to terrorism. Unlike their left-wing counterparts, they emphasised personal qualities like spontaneity and willingness to fight, even in a lost cause, over political objectives. Fioravanti has said, "About defeat we never cared, we are a generation of losers, always on the side of the defeated."

== Members ==
The NAR was directed by former RAI child actor, Valerio Fioravanti, his brother Cristiano Fioravanti, Dario Pedretti, Francesca Mambro and Alessandro Alibrandi, who were previous militants of the Italian Social Movement (MSI).

Other important people associated with NAR included: Luigi Ciavardini, Gilberto Cavallini, Stefano Soderini, Franco Anselmi, Giorgio Vale, Massimo Carminati, Claudio Bracci, Stefano Bracci, Mario Corsi a.k.a. "Marione" (Big Mario), Stefano Tiraboschi, Lino Lai, Paolo Pizzonia, Patrizio Trochei, Walter Sordi, Marco Mario Massimi, Pasquale Belsito, Fiorenzo Trincanato, Andrea Vian, Massimiliano Fachini.

In 1980, NAR member Giorgio Vale became the leader of Terza Posizione, which was used as a front for the NAR.

== Actions ==
=== 1980 Bologna massacre ===
The 1980 bombing of the Bologna main train station, which killed 85 people, was part of the strategy of tension and intended to cast blame on militant leftist groups. NAR members Valerio Fioravanti and Francesca Mambro were convicted of the bombing.

=== Weapons cache in the Health Ministry ===
On 25 November 1981, Italian authorities discovered a weapons cache in the basements of the Health Ministry. According to the Banda della Magliana pentito, Maurizio Abbatino, NAR member Massimo Carminati was the only one who could freely access the weapons cache. Massimo Carminati not only held close links with the Banda della Magliana, but also with SISMI secret agents, in particular General Pietro Musumeci and Colonel Giuseppe Belmonte, a member of the Propaganda Due Masonic lodge.

=== Assassinations ===
On 23 June 1980, NAR members Gilberto Cavallini and Luigi Ciavardini (who was later sentenced to a 30-year prison term in 2007 for his role in the 1980 Bologna bombings) assassinated magistrate Mario Amato. Amato had been made responsible for investigations into the radical right in Italy after the assassination of judge Vittorio Occorsio on 10 July 1976 (Occorsio was shot by Pierluigi Concutelli, leader of the armed groups of the Ordine Nuovo). The two NAR members were also responsible for the earlier slaying of Francesco Evangelista on 28 May 1980.

== See also ==
- Anni di piombo
- Banda della Magliana
- Strategy of tension
- Assassination of Carmine Pecorelli
- 1980 Bologna massacre
- Armed, far-right organizations in Italy
