= Fabio De Felice =

Italian politician (1927–2024)

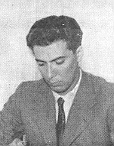
- De Felice in 1953

Member of the Chamber of Deputies of Italy for Perugia
- In office 25 June 1953 – 11 June 1958

Personal details
- Born: 13 July 1927 Alessandria, Italy
- Died: 11 January 2024 (aged 96) Poggio Catino, Italy
- Party: MSI (until 1955); PNM (1955–1959); UDNR (1960s)

Fabio De Felice (13 July 1927 – 11 January 2024) was an Italian politician. A member of the Italian Social Movement (MSI) and the Monarchist National Party, he served in the Chamber of Deputies from 1953 to 1958.

== Biography ==
De Felice was born in Alessandria, and trained as a schoolteacher. In 1953, he was seriously injured during riots incited by MSI activists in Trieste and had a leg amputated, necessitating the use of a wheelchair. Considered a hero by the party's supporters, he was adopted as a parliamentary candidate by the MSI soon afterwards and elected to the Chamber of Deputies, representing Perugia. He served in parliament for only one term, leaving the MSI for the Italian monarchists half-way through and standing down at the following election.

In 1965, De Felice joined the Democratic Union for the New Republic (UDNR), a nominally centrist political party founded by the former partisan and Italian Republican Party (PRI) deputy Randolfo Pacciardi. Although the UDNR's main political goal was the establishment of a secular, democratic "new Republic" with a strong executive branch, akin to what had been achieved by Charles De Gaulle in France a few years before, it also attracted the attention of fascists such as De Felice; this was partly due to Pacciardi's hostility to communism and his desire to overcome "the antithesis between fascism and antifascism", but it also stemmed from the party's rhetorical promises to "remake the state" through strong leadership, which was redolent of mussolinismo. De Felice was the UDNR's chief propagandist from 1967 onwards, but left some time before it was disbanded in 1980.

In the 1970s, De Felice turned decisively towards neo-fascism. He was allegedly involved with Ordine Nuovo, engaging in clandestine activity with several Ordinovisti (as a member of the so-called "Tivoli Group") even after the organisation was forcibly dissolved by the government in 1973. He was also implicated in the Borghese coup of 1970 alongside his brother Alfredo. By 1977, he was a senior figure in a small, far-right vanguard grouping named "Let's Build Action" (Costruiamo d'Azione). Within that organisation he was, alongside Aldo Semerari, the leader of a "traditionalist" faction that eschewed direct revolutionary action in favour of constructing a logistical base that would bring together like-minded militant groups and individuals, including criminal elements. De Felice and Semerari were among those arrested in the "blitz" of 28 August 1980, following the Bologna massacre earlier that month in which 85 people died. Charged with "subversive association" and put on trial in 1987, De Felice was acquitted the following year. (Note: Semerari was murdered in 1982 and so never brought to trial.)

De Felice died in Poggio Catino on 11 January 2024, at the age of 96.
