= Teodoro Buontempo =

Italian politician

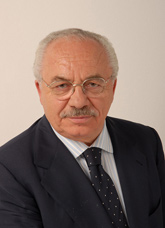
Buontempo in 2006

Teodoro Buontempo (21 January 1946 – 24 April 2013) was an Italian politician.

Born in Carunchio, Chieti, and a graduate in accounting, Buontempo first became involved in politics while living in Ortona. In 1968, he moved to Rome where he founded one of the first free Italian radio stations, "Radio Alternativa", whose headquarters in Via Sommacampagna became the focus of dozens of initiatives involving young members of the Italian Social Movement (MSI-DN). A member of the Central Committee of the MSI-DN from the 1970s, in 1981 he was elected a city councilor in Rome, and was continually re-elected until 1997. He was also a member of the Italian parliament from 1992 to 2006, first with MSI-DN and then, after that party's dissolution in 1995, with Alleanza Nazionale (AN). In 2007, he left the AN due to disagreements with the party secretary Gianfranco Fini and joined the movement La Destra, in which he remained president until his death. From 2010 until his death he was also assessor to the Lazio Regional government under Renata Polverini.
