= Francesco Pazienza =

Italian businessman and SISMI officer (1946–2025)

Francesco Pazienza (17 March 1946 – 22 June 2025) was an Italian businessman and officer of the SISMI, the Italian military intelligence agency. As of April 2007, he had been paroled to the community of Lerici, after serving many years in prison, including a 1993 conviction due to his role in the Banco Ambrosiano scandal, and a 1982 conviction for mishandling state secrets.

== Education ==
Born in Monteparano, Pazienza held a degree in medicine from the University of Rome. He worked as a business consultant in France during the 1970s. In 1979, he was hired into SISMI and became an assistant to SISMI director, General Giuseppe Santovito. Pazienza left the intelligence agency in the wake of the Propaganda Due scandal that rocked the Italian political scene in 1981. The Banco Ambrosiano scandal, Roberto Calvi's much-debated suicide, and charges of mishandling state secrets concerned with the 1980 Bologna bombing made Pazienza a fugitive from Italian law.

After hiding out in Seychelles, Pazienza ended up in the United States. A first extradition request from Italy was handed to the U.S. government in 1984, although Pazienza was not yet arrested. His arrest came only on 4 March 1985. Extradition procedures ensued, and a judge ordered him to stand trial in Italy, an appeal process did not change that, and Pazienza was handed over to the Italian government in June 1986.

== Mehmet Ali Ağca ==
During Mehmet Ali Ağca's trial for the 1981 assassination attempt on Pope John Paul II, Ağca claimed to have been visited by Pazienza in his prison cell at Rome's Ascoli Piceno; this came just after the presiding judge called for pazienza ("patience") in the courtroom. That Pazienza visited Ağca was also claimed by Giovanni Pandico, a former Camorra member turned pentito. From his New York prison, Pazienza denied ever having visited Ağca; Pazienza was questioned on this issue by Italian investigative judge Ilario Martella, in New York. A short time later, Martella dropped the charges of Ağca being coached by supposed elements from the Italian military intelligence.

== Banco Ambrosiano ==
When Pazienza was still a fugitive, he was questioned in the United States by Customs agents regarding financial fraud charges brought in Italy that had grown out of the disappearance of funds, about $3 million, from the Banco Ambrosiano. Pazienza later claimed that these Customs agents had told him that Stefano Delle Chiaie had been seen in Miami, Florida, with an unidentified Turk, and repeated his position during the time he was on trial on charges stemming from the 1980 Bologna bombing. It is unclear if this Turk was Abdullah Çatlı.

== Billy Carter investigation ==
A 1985 investigation by The Wall Street Journal suggested that a series of Billygate articles written by Michael Ledeen and published in The New Republic in October 1980 were part of a disinformation campaign intended to influence the outcome of that year's presidential election. (Note: According to both Boris Yuzhin and Oleg Gordievsky, the KGB conducted a large disinformation campaign in support of the Republican Party and Ronald Reagan to discredit Democratic Party members and Jimmy Carter during the 1980 United States presidential election.) According to the reporting, Pazienza alleged that Ledeen was paid $120,000 for his work on Billygate and other projects. Pazienza was later tried and convicted in absentia for using "extortion and fraud to obtain embarrassing facts about Billy Carter".

== Bologna bombing ==
Pazienza was sentenced in 1988 for trying to divert the investigation into the 1980 bombing of the Bologna train station on charges relating to the planting of similar explosive materials in a train in 1981, leading a trail away from the actual perpetrators. In 1990, his conviction was reversed on appeals; a retrial resulted in a definitive prison term handed out in 1995.

== Death ==
Pazienza died at a hospital in Sarzana, near La Spezia, on 22 June 2025, at the age of 79.
