= List of right-wing terrorist incidents in Europe =

Since the 1960s, several right-wing terrorist incidents have been carried out in Europe. This list includes major terrorist attacks carried out since that period.

== 1960–1969 ==
Date	Location	Article	Details	Deaths	Injuries
18 June 1961	Blacy, France	1961 Vitry-Le-François train bombing	A bomb attack on a Strasbourg–Paris train was carried out by Organisation armée secrète (OAS) terrorists, killing 28 people and wounding over 100. On the day after the derailment, investigators found that the rails had been sabotaged using an explosive device that went off when the train passed over it.	28	100+
10 March 1962	Issy-les-Moulineaux, France	1962 Issy-les-Moulineaux bombing	A car bomb planted by OAS terrorists exploded during a peace event in Issy-les-Moulineaux, killing three people and wounding 47 more.	3	47
22 August 1962	Clamart, France	Petit-Clamart attack	OAS members attempted to assassinate Charles de Gaulle, president of France at the time. The attack failed; one person was injured.	0	1
12 December 1969	Milan, Italy	Piazza Fontana bombing	A bomb exploded at the headquarters of Banca Nazionale dell'Agricoltura in Milan, killing 17 people and wounding 88. The bomb, planted by neo-fascists of the Ordine Nuovo movement, was an attempted to frame anarchist militants. Giuseppe Pinelli, a railway worker and anarchist, was killed by police after being arrested "as a suspect".	17	88

== 1970–1979 ==
Date	Location	Article	Details	Deaths	Injuries
22 July 1970	Gioia Tauro, Italy	1970 Gioia Tauro bombing	A bomb planted by neo-fascist terrorists of the National Vanguard group exploded on a train in Gioia Tauro, killing six people and wounding 77 more.	6	77
7 April 1971	Stockholm, Sweden	1971 Yugoslav Embassy shooting	Croatian separatists affiliated with the Ustaše movement opened fire at the embassy of the Socialist Federal Republic of Yugoslavia in Stockholm, killing ambassador Vladimir Rolović and wounding two other people.	1	2
4 December 1971	Belfast, Northern Ireland	McGurk's Bar bombing	Ulster Volunteer Force detonated a bomb at McGurk's Bar in Belfast, Northern Ireland, frequented by Irish Catholics. The explosion caused the building to collapse, killing fifteen Catholic civilians—including two children—and wounding seventeen more. It was the deadliest attack in Belfast during the Troubles.	15	17
26 January 1972	(Czechoslovakia) Srbská Kamenice, Sweden	JAT Flight 367	A McDonnell Douglas DC-9-32 aircraft (registration YU-AHT), en route from Stockholm, Sweden, to Belgrade, SFR Yugoslavia, exploded, broke into three pieces and crashed near the village of Srbská Kamenice. Of the 28 people on board, 27 were killed upon ground impact and one survived. It was suspected that the attack was carried out by far-right Croatian nationalists.	27	1
31 May 1972	Sagrado, Italy	Peteano massacre	Neo-fascists of the Ordine Nuovo ambushed a group of carabinieri with a car bomb in Sagrado, killing three and wounding two.	3	2
22 October 1972	Reggio Calabria, Italy	1972 bombings in Italy	Neo-fascist terrorists set off nine bombs aboard trains headed to Reggio Calabria bringing workers to the city for the protest march scheduled for the next day. Five people were wounded.	0	5
17 May 1973	Milan, Italy	Milan police headquarters bombing	A hand grenade was thrown at Milan's police headquarters by Ordine Nuovo, killing four people and wounding 45. The attack was an attempt to frame anarchist militants.	4	45
24 August–2 September 1973	Marseille (mainly) and other locations, France	1973 France racist attacks	At least 50 Algerians were killed and 300 others injured during a series of racist attacks in Marseille and other French cities.	50	300
14 December 1973	Marseille, France	Algerian consulate bombing in Marseille	Members of the far-right Charles Martel Group terrorist group carried out a bomb attack at the Algerian consulate in Marseille, killing four people and wounding 23 more.	4	23
22 July 1974	(Republic of Ireland) Dublin and Monaghan, Ireland	Dublin and Monaghan bombings	Right-wing terrorists of the Ulster Volunteer Force, a Ulster loyalist paramilitary group based in Northern Ireland, carried out three bomb attacks in Dublin and one in Monaghan, killing a total of 34 people and wounding about 300 more.	34	~300
28 May 1974	Brescia, Italy	Piazza della Loggia bombing	A bomb, planted by Ordine Nuovo and placed inside a rubbish bin, exploded at the east end of a square where an anti-fascist protest was ongoing. Eight people were killed, including a former partistan; 102 others were wounded.	8	102
4 August 1974	San Benedetto Val di Sambro, Italy	Italicus Express bombing	A bomb planted by Ordine Nero neo-fascist exploded on the Italicus Express, killing 12 people and injuring 48 more. The train was traveling from Rome to Munich; having left Florence about 45 minutes earlier, it was approaching the end of the long San Benedetto Val di Sambro tunnel under the Apennines. The bomb had been placed in the fifth passenger car of the train and exploded at 01:23. Under its own momentum, the train reached the end of the tunnel.	12	48
31 July 1975	County Down, Northern Ireland	Miami Showband killings	Three members of the Miami Showband cabaret band were killed and two more injured after Ulster Volunteer Force opened fire against their bus. Two gunmen also died after accidentally set off a bomb.	5 (including 2 perpetrators)	2
9 May 1976	Montejurra, Spain	Montejurra incidents	Neo-fascist gunmen opened fire at a Carlist Party's celebration in Montejurra, killing two people and wounding three more.	2	3
10 July 1976	Rome, Italy	–	Judge Vittorio Occorsio was shot and killed by Ordine Nuovo gunmen inside his car in Rome. Occorsio was investigating the links between the P2 masonic lodge and the neo-fascist terrorists.	1	0
24 January 1977	Madrid, Spain	1977 Atocha massacre	Neo-fascists affiliated with New Force and Warriors of Christ the King opened fire at a legal support office for workers in Madrid, killing five labor activists from the Communist Party of Spain and the workers' federation Comisiones Obreras and wounding four more.	5	4
1 May 1977	Istanbul, Turkey	Taksim Square massacre	The anti-communist Counter-Guerrilla, linked to the Stay-behind operation in Europe, opened fire at an International Workers' Day demonstration in Taksim Square, Istanbul, killing between 34 and 42 people, and wounding over 120 others.	34–42	120+
28 February 1978	Rome, Italy	Murder of Roberto Scialabba	Roberto Scialabba, a militant of the far-left Lotta Continua group, was shot and killed at a park in Rome by three Nuclei Armati Rivoluzionari (NAR) neo-fascists.	1	0
16 March 1978	Istanbul, Turkey	Taksim Square massacre	Grey Wolves terrorist carried out a shooting and bomb attack at Istanbul University, targeting leftist students. Seven people were killed and 41 injured.	7	41
18 March 1978	Milan, Italy	Killing of Fausto and Iaio	Two far-left militants were shot and killed on a street in Milan. Nobody was convicted for their murders. Various theories were spread, which linked both neo-fascists and secret services to the killing, as both the victims were revealing a link between the drug trade and the neo-fascists.	2	0
9 October 1978	Çankaya District, Turkey	Bahçelievler massacre	Seven university students of the Workers' Party were murdered by Grey Wolves terrorists in a shooting attack at an apartment and against a car.	7	0
21–26 December 1978	Kahramanmaraş, Turkey	Maraş massacre	At least 105 people were killed during a series of targeted attacks by Grey Wolves terrorist against left-wing militants in Kahramanmaraş.	105+	Several
1 February 1979	Istanbul, Turkey	Assassination of Abdi İpekçi	Journalist Abdi İpekçi, editor-in-chief of one of the main Turkish daily newspapers Milliyet, was murdered in his car on the way back home from his office in front of his apartment building in Istanbul by two Grey Wolves gunmen. The CIA was involved in the murder like in other terrorist attacks in both Italy and Turkey.	1	0
23 February 1979	Istanbul, Turkey	–	Kurdish-Turkish political and religious activist Metin Yüksel, and member of the Raiders Organization, was assassinated inside Faith Mosque by Grey Wolves gunmen.	1	0

== 1980–1989 ==
Date	Location	Article	Details	Deaths	Injuries
20 January 1980	Alonsotegi, Spain	Alonsotegi bombing	Far-right Grupos Armados Españoles (GAL) terrorists, a Spanish state-sponsored death squad, planted a bomb at a bar in Alonsotegi, thought to be a meeting point for Basque moderate nationalists. Four people were killed and ten wounded.	4	10
1 February 1980	Madrid and Eibar, Spain	–	Communist militant Yolanda González and former Euskadiko Ezkerra militant Jesús María Zubikarai Badiola were murdered in two separate locations by Batallón Vasco Español terrorists.	2	0
22 February 1980	Rome, Italy	Murder of Valerio Verbano	19-year-old Valerio Verbano, militant of the left-wing Potere Operaio organization, was stabbed and killed by three Nuclei Armati Rivoluzionari (NAR) neo-fascists inside his home in Rome.	1	0
May–July 1980	Çorum Province, Turkey	Çorum massacre	At least 57 people were killed and over 200 others injured in a massacre committed by Alevi people by far-right terrorists.	57	200+
23 July 1980	Bilbao, Spain	–	A bomb planted by Triple A terrorists exploded in Bilbao, killing two Sinti brothers, aged 12 and 17, and a 59-year-old municipal cleaning employee. It was suspected that the main targeted was a nursery in the area, which belonged to Herri Batasuna.	3	0
2 August 1980	Bologna, Italy	Bologna massacre	A time bomb, planted by NAR neo-fascists and hidden in an unattended suitcase, detonated in an air-conditioned waiting room at the Bologna station, which was full of people seeking relief from the August heat. The explosion collapsed the roof of the waiting room, destroyed most of the main building, and hit the Ancona–Chiasso train which was waiting at the first platform, killing 85 people and wounding 200 more.	85	200
26 September 1980	Berlin, West Germany	Oktoberfest bombing	An improvised explosive device exploded at the main entrance of the Oktoberfest festival in Munich, killing 12 people and wounding 213 more. The attack was carried out by far-right terrorist Gundolf Köhler, who also died in the explosion, and possibly other accomplices.	13 (including the perpetrator)	213
31 December 1981 – 9 November 1985	Province of Brabant (mainly) and other locations, Belgium	Brabant killers	A series of robberies carried out by three still unidentified men resulted in the killing of 28 people and the wounding of 22 others. The perpetrators, who were never arrested, were suspected far-right terrorists. The suspected main aim of the attacks were the random killing of civilians with the intent of causing fear.	28	22
24 June 1982	Nuremberg, West Germany	1982 Nuremberg shooting	A 26-year-old neo-Nazi shot and killed two black Americans and an Egyptian man, and wounded three other people, before killing himself.	4 (including the perpetrator)	3
15 October 1983	Bayonne, France	Killing of Lasa and Zabala	Two alleged Basque separatist Euskadi Ta Askatasuna (ETA) group members were kidnapped and murdered by GAL gunmen in Bayonne.	2	0
3 May 1984	Alfortville, France	Alfortville Armenian Genocide Memorial bombings	A bomb exploded at the Armenian Genocide Memorial in Alfortville, wounding 13 people. The perpetrator was Abdullah Çatlı, leader of the neo-fascist Grey Wolves and contract killer for the National Intelligence Organization.	0	13
11 November 1984	Châteaubriant, France	1984 Châteaubriant shooting	A 23-year-old Neo-Nazi opened fire against a group of Turkish workers at a café in Châteaubriant, killing two and wounding five more.	2	5
26 August 1984	Duisburg, Germany	1984 Duisburg arson attack	A woman carried out an arson attack against the home of a Turkish family in Duisburg, killing seven people and wounding 25 more. Four fatalities were children. The perpetrator was arrested in 1994; she admitted previous arson attacks against migrants.	7	25
2 February 1985	Athens, Greece	1985 Athens bar bombing	A bar in Athens, popular among American air forces, was bombed by far-right National Front members, injuring 78 people. The group said that "they targeted Americans for occupying Cyprus".	0	78
14 June 1985	Oslo, Norway	Nor mosque bombing	A bomb was detonated at the Ahmadiyya Muslim Noor Mosque in Frogner in Oslo. injuring a 38-year-old woman. The attack was carried out by a member of the National People's Party.	0	1
25 September 1985	Bayonne, France	Monbar Hotel attack	The GAL murdered four members of the ETA group, whom the Spanish government believed to be senior figures in the organization inside a hotel in Bayonne. A fifth person, apparently unconnected to ETA, was injured in the shooting. This represented the deadliest attack carried out by the GAL. Although two of the participants were apprehended shortly after the shooting, controversy surrounded the possible involvement of senior figures in the Spanish police.	4	1
May 1987	Anderlecht, Belgium	–	Two people were killed during a shooting attack at a synagogue in Anderlecht carried out by a member of the far-right Westland New Post.	2	0
9 May – 19 December 1988	Cannes and Nice, France	1988 Cannes and Nice attacks	Members of the neo-Nazi French and European Nationalist Party organization carried out two bombing attacks against two hotels between Cannes and Nice, killing a Romanian immigrant and wounding 16 other people.	1	16
22 October 1988	Paris, France	Saint-Michel cinema attack	Catholic integralists set fire to the Saint Michel cinema in Paris while it was showing the film The Last Temptation of Christ: a little after midnight, an incendiary device ignited under a seat in the less supervised underground room, where a different film was being shown. Fourteen people were wounded. The incendiary device consisted of a charge of potassium chlorate, triggered by a vial containing sulphuric acid.	0	14
December 1988	Schwandorf, Germany	–	A far-right extremist carried out an arson attack against a residential building in Schwandorf, killing Turkish couple Fatma and Osman Can together with their son Mehmet, and the German Jürgen Hübner. The perpetrator admitted that Turks were his main target.	4	0
20 November 1989	Madrid, Spain	–	Josu Muguruza, a Basque journalist and politician, was assassinated inside a restaurant in Madrid by GAL gunmen.	1	0

== 1990–1999 ==
Date	Location	Article	Details	Deaths	Injuries
25 November 1990	Eberswalde, Germany	–	A group of 60 right-wing extremists attacked a group of black immigrants outside an inn, killing a 28-year-old man from Angola and wounding several other people.	1	Several
August 1991–January 1992	Stockholm and Uppsala, Sweden	John Ausonius	Between August 1991 to January 1992, far-right terrorist John Ausonius shot eleven people in the Stockholm and Uppsala area, most of whom were immigrants, killing one and seriously injuring the others. He first used a rifle equipped with a laser sight (hence his nickname), and later switched to a revolver. He was arrested in June 1992 and sentenced to life imprisonment in January 1994.	1	10
23 February 1992	Frankfurt, Germany	John Ausonius	After the shooting spree in Sweden, Ausonius murdered Blanka Zmigrod, a Holocaust survivor, in Frankfurt. For this murder, he was sentenced to life imprisonment in Germany in 2018.	1	0
24 April 1992	Berlin, Germany	–	A 29-year-old man from Vietnam was stabbed and killed by a right-wing extremist motivated by xenophobia.	1	0
1 July 1992	Ostfildern, Germany	–	Seven right-wing extremists attacked and killed a 56-year-old Kosovo Albanian man inside his residence.	1	0
8 July 1992	Neuruppin, Germany	–	Three right-wing extremists carried out a stabbing attack on a street with the intent of attacking homeless people. A 56-year-old man was beaten and stabbed, before being killed.	1	0
22 November 1992	Mölln, Germany	1992 Mölln arson attack	Two neo-Nazis carried out an arson attack against two homes in Mölln where Turkish families lived, killing three people and wounding nine more.	3	9
24 August 1992	Koblenz, Germany	–	A neo-Nazis opened fire on the central square of Koblenz, targeting homeless people, punks and people with drug addictions. A 35-year-old homeless man was killed.	1	0
29 August 1992	Berlin, Germany	–	A Ku Klux Klan sympathizer threatened a group of people of foreign origins, before attacking two homeless people, killing a 58-year-old German and wounding another person.	1	1
11 October 1992	Geierswalde, Germany	–	A group of Neo-Nazis stormed a bar, chanting Nazi inns, killing a waitress.	1	0
7 November 1992	Lehnin, Germany	–	Two Neo-Nazis murdered a 52-year-old German homeless man in Lehnin. The murderers belonged to two Neo-Nazi organizations.	1	0
11 April 1993	Montanejos, Valencia, Spain	Assassination of Guillem Agulló	Guillem Agulló, Valencian anti-fascist and pro-Catalan independence young activist, member of Maulets and of Skinheads Against Racial Prejudice (SHARP), travelled to Montanejos alongside some friends, when they were attacked by a group of young fascists shouting "Sieg Heil" and "Viva España" and one of them stabbed him in the heart, causing his death. The attackers left singing the Spanish fascist anthem "Cara al Sol". The assassination was perpetrated by the fascist group "Komando Marchalenes IV Reich", named in honor of the Nazi regime, which was composed of Pedro Cuevas (the material perpetrator of the assassination), Gerardo Mora, Juan Manuel Sánchez, José Cuñat, and Francisco Garcia. Family members and left-wing and pro-independence organizations denounced that the motive for the crime had been political, since the murderers were known for their Spanish and fascist ideology and that they were also aware of the anti-fascist ideology of Agulló. The trial of the case, held in Castelló de la Plana, in 1995, was contested and caused controversy. In a heavily criticized decision, the judge rejected accusations of political assassination, stating that it was a "fight between youngsters". The only condemned person was Cuevas, who was condemned to 14 years in prison, of which he only served 4. The other members were dismissed.	1	0
22 April 1993	Eltham, United Kingdom	Murder of Stephen Lawrence	An 18-year black man, Stephen Lawrence, was stabbed and killed in a racially motivated attack while waiting for a bus on Well Hall Road, Eltham. After the initial investigation, five suspects were arrested but not charged; a private prosecution subsequently initiated by Lawrence's family failed to secure convictions for any of the accused. It was suggested during the investigation that Lawrence was killed because he was black, and that the handling of the case by the Metropolitan Police Service (MPS) and Crown Prosecution Service (CPS) was affected by issues of race. A 1998 public inquiry, headed by Sir William Macpherson, concluded that the original MPS investigation was incompetent and that the force was institutionally racist. It also recommended that the double jeopardy rule should be repealed in murder cases to allow a retrial upon new and compelling evidence: this was effected in 2005 upon enactment of the Criminal Justice Act 2003. The publication in 1999 of the resulting Macpherson Report has been called "one of the most important moments in the modern history of criminal justice in Britain". Jack Straw said that ordering the inquiry was the most important decision he made during his tenure as home secretary from 1997 to 2001. In 2010, the Lawrence case was said to be "one of the highest-profile unsolved racially motivated murders". On 18 May 2011, after a further review, it was announced that two of the original suspects, Gary Dobson and David Norris, were to stand trial for the murder in the light of new evidence. At the same time it was disclosed that Dobson's original acquittal had been quashed by the Court of Appeal, allowing a retrial to take place. Such an appeal had only become possible following the 2005 change in the law, although Dobson was not the first person to be retried for murder as a result. On 3 January 2012, Dobson and Norris were found guilty of Lawrence's murder; the pair were juveniles at the time of the crime and were sentenced to detention at Her Majesty's pleasure, equivalent to a life sentence for an adult, with minimum terms of 15 years 2 months and 14 years 3 months respectively for what the judge described as a "terrible and evil crime". In March 2025 Norris eventually admitted his involvement in the crime.	1	0
28 May 1993	Mölln, Germany	1993 Solingen arson attack	Four neo-Nazis carried out an arson attack against the home of a Turkish family in Solingen, killing five people and wounding 14 more. The fatalities were three children and two women.	5	14
18 February 1994	Darmstadt, Germany	–	A Neo-Nazi opened fire against a small business in Darmstadt, killing a Turkish man and wounding her daughter, future actress Aslı Bayram.	1	1
18 June 1994	Loughinisland, Northern Ireland	Loughinisland massacre	Ulster Volunteer Force burst into a pub with assault rifles and fired on the customers, killing six civilians and wounding five. The pub was targeted because it was frequented mainly by Catholics.	6	5
21 February 1995	Marseille, France	Murder of Ibrahim Ali	Ibrahim Ali, a 17-year old French citizen of Comorian descent, was shot and killed by Robert Lagier, a supporter of the far-right Front National. At the time of the shooting, Lagier was putting up campaign posters for the party's presidential candidate, Jean-Marie Le Pen, alongside two other supporters. All three men were later convicted in relation to the attack. Evidence presented during the trial indicated that the shooting was racially motivated and the chief prosecutor attributed the attack to Front National's "paranoid ideology".	1	0
5 June 1997	Riga, Latvia	–	Two members of the far-right Pērkonkrusts group attempted to bomb the Monument to the Liberators of Soviet Latvia and Riga from the German Fascist Invaders. The attack failed, with both the perpetrators being killed in the explosion.	2 (the perpetrators)	0
17–30 April 1999	London, United Kingdom	1999 London nail bombings	Over three successive weekends between 17 and 30 April 1999, homemade nail bombs were detonated in Brixton in South London; at Brick Lane, Spitalfields, in the East End; and at the Admiral Duncan pub in Soho in the West End. Each bomb contained up to 1,500 100 mm nails, in duffel bags that were left in public spaces. The bombs killed three people and injured 140 people, four of whom lost limbs. On 2 May 1999, the Metropolitan Police Anti-Terrorist Branch charged 22-year-old David Copeland with murder. Copeland, who became known as the "London nail bomber", was a Neo-Nazi militant and a former member of two political groups, the British National Party and then the National Socialist Movement. The bombings were aimed at London's black, Bengali, and LGBT communities.	3	140
28 May 1999	Malexander, Sweden	Malexander murders	Two police officers were killed following a bank robbery in Kisa. Three individuals were convicted of the crime. They were all active neo-Nazis, and the robbery was carried out to finance the creation of a Nazi organization.	2	0
12 October 1999	(Sweden) Skärholmen, Germany	Murder of Björn Söderberg	Anarcho-syndicalist Björn Söderberg was assassinated by two neo-fascist gunmen inside his home in Skärholmen. The murder was carried out after Söderberg revealed that a member of his trade union, the SAC Syndikalisterna, was a neo-fascist spy of the National Youth.	1	0

== 2000–2009 ==
Date	Location	Article	Details	Deaths	Injuries
September 2000–April 2007	Germany	National Socialist Underground murders	Between September 2000 and April 2007, the neo-Nazi National Socialist Underground carried out a series of racist shooting attacks, killing eight people originally from Turkey, one from Greece and a German policewoman. Another person was wounded. Two of the perpetrators later killed themself, while a third was arrested. As the right-wing connection with these crimes began to be investigated, it was discovered that sectors of German intelligence could have had links with the NSU and had prior knowledge of the nature of the killings.	10	1
26 January 2001	Oslo, Norway	Murder of Benjamin Hermansen	Members of the Neo-Nazi Boot Boys stabbed and killed a 15-year-old Norwegian boy for being of Ghanaian origins.	1	0
9 August 2001	Wittenberge, Germany	–	A 61-year-old alcoholist man was murdered by two Neo-Nazis. One of the perpetrators made the Nazi salute many times during the escape; the murder was carried out for considering the victim as "an inferior".	1	0
17 August 2001	Fulda, Germany	–	A 54-year-old woman, owner of a shop, was murdered by a young man as a "ritual" for entering a Neo-Nazi organization.	1	0
13 July 2002	Potzlow, Germany	Murder of Marinus Schöberl	A 16-year-old boy was murdered in Potzlow, Brandenburg, by three right-wing teenagers for "looking like a Jew".	1	0
9 August 2002	Sulzbach, Germany	–	A 19-year-old Turkish man was stabbed by a Neo-Nazi; the victim died the next day. Flags with Nazi symbols were found at the perpetrator's home.	1	0
June 2003–October 2010	Malmö, Sweden	2003–2010 Malmö murders	A far-right serial killer carried out a number of murders and attempted murders in Malmö with the intent of starting a "race war". He killed two men of foreign origins between June and July 2003. On 9 October 2009, he killed a Swedish woman and critically injured her Albanian male partner. Eleven other people were wounded in other attacks. The perpetrator was arrested in November 2010, aged 38.	3	12
9 June 2004	Cologne, Germany	2004 Cologne bombing	A nail bomb planted by National Socialist Underground terrorists detonated in a business area popular with immigrants from Turkey. Twenty-two people were wounded, with four sustaining serious injuries. A barber shop was destroyed; many shops and numerous parked cars were seriously damaged by the explosion and by the nails added to the bomb for extra damage.	0	24
11 January 2006	Moscow, Russia	Bolshaya Bronnaya Synagogue stabbings	A man entered a synagogue during evening prayers and stabbed eight people. The Moscow City Court later found him guilty of "inciting ethnic hatred".	0	9
11 May 2006	Antwerp, Belgium	2006 Antwerp shooting	A 18-year-old man critically wounded a Turkish woman and killed a Malian nanny and her Belgian charge. He was stopped by a police officer who injured him, before being arrested. The perpetrator admitted that he targeted "non-white people".	2	1
19 May 2006	Moscow, Russia	-	A Chinese citizen was stabbed to death my militants of the far-right The Savior terrorist organization in Moscow.	1	0
21 August 2006	Moscow, Russia	2006 Moscow market bombing	A bomb planted by members of the far-right The Savior terrorist group exploded at a market in Moscow, killing 13 people, including eleven foreigners. Forty-seven others were injured. Central Asian migrants were the main target of the attack.	13	47
19 January 2007	Istanbul, Turkey	Assassination of Hrant Dink	Hrant Dink, a Turkish-Armenian journalist and editor-in-chief of Agos, was murdered at his offices by a Turkish ultra-nationalist. Dink promoted reconciliation between Turks and Armenians.	1	0
20 April 2007	Moscow, Russia	Murder of Shamil Odamanov	Members of the neo-Nazi Format18 and National Socialist Society groups murdered two men from Tajikistan and Daghestan in Moscow.	2	0
11 November 2007	Madrid, Spain	Murder of Carlos Palomino	Anti-fascist militant Carlos Palomino was stabbed and killed by a Neo-Nazi in Legazpi Station in Madrid. Two others were wounded. The perpetrator was a soldier of the Spanish Army.	1	2
2008–2009	Hungary	2008–2009 neo-Nazi murders of Roma in Hungary	A series of Neo-Nazi attacks targeting Romani people in Hungary, carried out with pistols and petrol bombs, killed six people and wounded another.	6	1
10 October 2008	Moscow, Russia	–	27-year-old Antifa leader and anti-racist Trojan skinhead Fyodor "Nok" Filatov was stabbed and killed by members of the Battle Organization of Russian Nationalists (BORN) members.	1	0
19 January 2009	Moscow, Russia	Murders of Stanislav Markelov and Anastasia Baburova	A human rights lawyer and a journalist, Stanislav Markelov and Anastasia Baburova, were shot and killed by BORN member Nikita Tikhonov in broad daylight.	2	0
18–19 April 2009	Vítko, Czech Republic	2009 Vítkov arson attack	Three molotov cocktails were thrown by three Neo-Nazis through the windows of a house inhabited by a Romani family, injuring three people.	0	3
16 November 2009	Moscow, Russia	–	Two anti-fascist militants, Ivan Khutorskoy and Ilya Dzhaparidze, were murdered in two separate locations in Moscow by members of the BORN.	2	0
12 April 2010	Moscow, Russia	–	Federal city court judge Eduard Chuvashov of the Moscow City Court, who handed down a verdict in the case of the murders of Markelov and Baburova, was murdered by BORN member Alexei Korshunov, who fired gunshots into his chest and head. Chuvashov was selected by the group on account that he had issued numerous guilty verdicts on dozens of high-profile criminal cases involving hate crimes.	1	0

== 2010–2019 ==
Date	Location	Article	Details	Deaths	Injuries
22 July 2011	Batman, Turkey	Murder of Sevag Balıkçı	Sevag Balıkçı, a Turkish soldier of Armenian origins, was murdered during his military service in the province of Batman. The killing happened on the day of the commemoration of the Armenian genocide. The perpetrator was an ultra-nationalist and sympathizer of the Great Unity Party.	1	0
22 July 2011	Oslo, Norway	2011 Norway attacks	Far-right terrorist Anders Behring Breivik carried out two attacks in Oslo. The first attack was a car bomb explosion in Oslo within Regjeringskvartalet, the executive government quarter of Norway, at 15:25:22 (CEST). The bomb was placed inside a van next to the tower block housing the office of the then Prime Minister Jens Stoltenberg. The explosion killed 8 people and injured at least 209 people, 12 severely. The second attack occurred less than two hours later at a summer camp on the island of Utøya in Tyrifjorden, Buskerud. The camp was organised by the AUF, the youth wing of the ruling Norwegian Labour Party (AP). Breivik, dressed in a homemade police uniform and showing false identification, took a ferry to the island and opened fire at the participants, killing 69 and injuring 32.	77	320+
13 December 2011	Florence, Italy	2011 Florence shootings	A militant of the neo-fascist party CasaPound opened fire at Piazza Dalmazia market in Florence, killing two Senegalese street vendors. He then fled in a car and wounded two more vendors at the San Lorenzo market, before committing suicide.	3 (including the perpetrator)	2
9–10 January 2013	Paris, France	2013 triple murder of Kurdish activists in Paris	Three Kurdish women activists were found murdered in the premises of the Centre d'Information sur le Kurdistan in Paris. The perpetrator, a Turkish man who supported the far-right Nationalist Movement Party, was arrested.	3	0
23 April 2013	Birmingham, United Kingdom	–	Ukrainian neo-Nazi Pavlo Lapshyn stabbed and killed 82-year-old Mohammed Saleem, a British–Pakistani Muslim man, while returning from the Green Lane Masjid mosque. Lapshyn, who arrived in the country just five days before the murder, also attempted to bomb three mosques; the attacks however failed.	1	0
5 June 2013	Paris, France	Killing of Clément Méric	An 18-year-old anti-fascist militant was stabbed and killed by two neo-Nazis in Paris.	1	0
18 September 2013	Keratsini, Greece	–	Anti-fascist Greek rapper Pavlos Fyssas was murdered during a stabbing attack by a member of the neo-fascist group Golden Dawn.	1	0
17 October 2015	Cologne, Germany	Attempted assassination of Henriette Reker	Henriette Reker, a candidate for mayor of Cologne, was stabbed in the neck by a 44-year-old man during a campaign event. Four other individuals were also injured in the attack. The perpetrator confessed that the attack was motivated by xenophobic beliefs.	0	5
22 October 2015	Trollhättan, Sweden	Trollhättan school stabbing	A 21-year-old Neo Nazi man entered a school in Trollhättan, carrying out a mass stabbing and targeting people of migrant background. Three people were killed and two injured. The perpetrator was shot and killed by police.	4 (including the perpetrator)	2
16 June 2016	Birstall, United Kingdom	Murder of Jo Cox	Jo Cox, a British Labour Party politician and Member of Parliament (MP) for Batley and Spen, was killed by far-right extremist Thomas Mair, who shot her twice in the head and once in the chest with a modified .22 hunting rifle then stabbed her fifteen times outside a library on Market Street. A 77-year-old mines rescuer was also stabbed and wounded by the perpetrator after he tried to save Cox.	1	1
22 July 2016	Munich, Germany	2016 Munich shooting	A mass shooting occurred in the vicinity of the Olympia shopping mall in the Moosach district of Munich. An 18-year-old Iranian-German, David Sonboly, opened fire on fellow teenagers at a McDonald's restaurant before shooting at bystanders in the street outside, before killing himsel itself. Nine people were killed, and 36 others were injured. Sonboly "had considered himself part of the Aryan race, and boasted about sharing the same birthday as Adolf Hitler", wrote anti-Turkish messages, admired Germany's right-wing AfD party, and was "very nationalistic". All the victims of the attack had a migrant background.	10 (including the perpetrator)	36
19 October 2016	Georgensgmünd, Germany	–	A neo-Nazi opened fire during a police control, killing an officer and wounding two more.	1	2
19 June 2017	London, United Kingdom	2017 Finsbury Park van attack	An Islamophobic terrorist attack occurred in Finsbury Park, London, when a van was intentionally driven into a crowd of Muslim pedestrians near the Muslim Welfare House, 100 yards (90 m) from the Finsbury Park Mosque, killing 1 and injuring 11.	1	11
3 February 2018	Macerata, Italy	Macerata shooting	A neo-fascist in Macerata, driving a black Alfa Romeo 147 and armed with a 9mm Glock 17 Gen3 semi-automatic pistol, seriously wounded, in a drive-by shooting, six African migrants. The perpetrator had had an Italian flag draped on his shoulders and raised his arm in a fascist salute at the time of his arrest.	0	6
24 June 2018	Lviv, Ukraine	-	A masked group of the S14 neo-Nazi group, armed with batons and other weapons, targeted a Romani camp on the outskirts of the city of Lviv shortly before midnight, killing a person and wounding four others.	1	4
2 June 2019	Istha, Germany	Murder of Walter Lübcke	Walter Lübcke, head of the public administration of the Kassel region, was killed in front of his home by a shot to the head at close range. Thirteen days later, right-wing extremist Stephan Ernst was arrested and confessed the murder. Ernst had been previously convicted for knife and bomb attacks against targets connected to ethnic minorities in Germany.	1	0
22 July 2019	Wächtersbach, Germany		A right-wing extremist shot and injured an Eritrean man in a racially motivated attack, before going to a bar, where he bragged about his crime. He later fled and killed himself in Biebergemünd.	1 (the perpetrator)	1
10 August 2019	Bærum, Norway	2019 Bærum murder and mosque attack	A right-wing Norwegian man killed his adoptive sister of Chinese origins, before opening fire at a mosque. No one was injured, and the perpetrator was subdued by the three worshippers.	1	0
28 October 2019	Bayonne, France	Bayonne mosque shooting	An 84-year-old man, motivated by Islamophobia, opened fire at a mosque in the southwestern town of Bayonne. He seriously injured two people by gunfire. He attempted to burn down the mosque, before being arrested. The perpetrator died in prison four months later.	0	2
9 October 2019	Halle, Germany	Halle synagogue shooting	A Neo-Nazi soldier of the German Army attempted to break in a synagogue in Halle, failing in his intention. He then killed a woman who was passing in the area, before opening fire inside a kebab shop, killing a customer. He escaped from the scene, wounding a couple in an attempted carjacking, before being arrested.	2	2
19 December 2019	Moscow, Russia	Moscow FSB headquarters shooting	A Russian neo-Nazi attacked the headquarters of Russia's Federal Security Service with a semi-automatic rifle, killing two people and wounding others before committing suicide. He is suspected of having ties to the Atomwaffen Division.	3 (including the perpetrator)	5

== 2020–present ==
Date	Location	Article	Details	Deaths	Injuries
19 February 2020	Hanau, Germany	Hanau shootings	A Neo-Nazi opened fire against three shisha bars and a kiosk in Hanau, killing nine people with a migrant background and wounding six others. In the aftermath, the perpetrator killed his mother at home, before committing suicide.	12 (including the perpetrator)	4
12 October 2020	Zagreb, Croatia	2020 Zagreb shooting	A 22-year-old right-wing gunman approached Banski dvori, which houses the office of the Prime Minister and serves as the meeting place of the government, on St. Mark's Square and started shooting at it with an assault rifle, wounding a police officer in the process. In the aftermath, the perpetrator ran off to a nearby neighborhood and committed suicide.	1 (the perpetrator)	1
19 August 2021	Eslöv, Sweden	2021 Eslöv school stabbing	A 15-year-old male attacked his school in the Eslöv area, injuring a teacher; the investigation revealed he was inspired by the Christchurch mosque shootings and was a white supremacist.	0	1
12 October 2022	Bratislava, Slovakia	2022 Bratislava shooting	A far-right terrorist opened fire at a gay bar in Bratislava, killing two people and wounding another, before killing himself.	3 (including the perpetrator)	1
30 October 2022	Dover, United Kingdom	Dover firebomb attack	A far-right man drove a white Seat Tarraco to the Border Force centre in Dover, Kent, and threw two or three petrol bombs at the complex, injuring two people. One of the bombs failed to ignite. A witness stated that the attacker then drove to a petrol station and tied a noose around his neck and attached it to a metal pole before driving off, killing himself.	1 (the perpetrator)	2
23 December 2022	Paris, France	2022 Paris shooting	A 69-year-old man motivated by racism opened fire near the Ahmet Kaya Kurdish Cultural Centre in Paris, killing two people. He next fired three shots in the direction of a Kurdish restaurant opposite the cultural center, killing one person. He then fired three shots into a Kurdish hairdressing salon, wounding three people.	3	4 (including the perpetrator)
23 May 2023	Tours, France	2023 Tours bombing	A masked individual threw a bottle containing acid and aluminum, an explosive mixture, at the LGBT center of Tours. After the two employees and a volunteer inside went out to investigate, the perpetrator allegedly said, "Good luck" before fleeing. The device then delayed in detonating, allowing the three volunteers to seek shelter. The center suffered significant damage as a result of the attack. The perpetrator was a 17-year-old integralist Catholic.	0	0
2 April 2024	Hindlip, United Kingdom		A 33-year-old Neo-Nazi stabbed an Eritrean refugee at a hotel, before attempting a racially motivated mass stabbing, which subsequently failed. The attack was motivated by his extreme racial views and anger over the small boats crisis.	0	1
12 August 2024	Eskişehir, Turkey	2024 Eskişehir stabbing	An 18-year-old Neo-Nazi stabbed and wounded five people at a mosque in Eskisehir. He had originally intended to target an office of the Communist Party of Türkiye, but chose to attack the mosque due to preparation time constraints.	0	5
20 December 2024	Magdeburg, Germany	2024 Magdeburg car attack	A SUV was driven into a crowd at the Christmas market in Magdeburg, Germany, killing six people and injuring at least 299 others. The perpetrator, a Saudi Arabian man known for his Islamophobia, had right-wing ideas, supported the AfD party and had Zionist views. He shared conspiracy theories, such as "Germany wants to Islamize Europe", blaming German society for it.	6	299
16 January 2025	Spišská Stará Ves, Slovakia	Spišská Stará Ves school stabbing	An 18-year-old man killed two women and wounded two others during a mass stabbing at a school, before being arrested. The perpetrator, known for previous attacks on women, acted for misogyny. He also performed the Nazi salute and expressed hate for Romani people in previous incidents.	2	2
25 April 2025	La Grand-Combe, France		A 24-year-old man from Mali, Aboubakar Cisse, was stabbed and killed by a far-right terrorist inside a mosque. The killer filmed the murder, shouting Islamophobic slurs. The perpetrator escaped and was later arrested in Italy.	1	0
26 April 2025	Leeds, United Kingdom	Otley Run pub crawl attack	Two women were wounded in a crossbow attack at a pub. The perpetrator died after committing suicide. He released a manifesto online in which he expressed misogyny and hate for feminism.	1 (the perpetrator)	2
31 May 2025	Puget-sur-Argens, France		A Tunisian man was shot and killed inside his home in Puget-sur-Argens by a far-right terrorist. The killer, who is a supporter of the National Rally, was described by his neighbours as a known xenophobe.	1	0
24 August 2025	Oslo, Norway	Killing of Tamima Nibras Juhar	An Ethiopian-born Muslim woman was stabbed and killed by an 18-year-old man with xhenophobic and islamophobic views at a child welfare centre in Kampen, Oslo. She suffered extensive stabs and cuts in various areas of her body. The prosecutor refused to release details about the attack.	1	0
29 September 2025	Espoo, Finland		An 18-year-old man attacked a vocational school and tried to stab two students who had foreign backgrounds. In a manifesto he had published prior to the attack, the perpetrator claimed that he hated sexual minorities, ethnic minorities, and leftists.	0	0
16 December 2025	Odintsovo, Russia	2025 Odintsovo school attack	A 15-year-old male student attacked fellow students and school staff with a knife and pepper spray, killing a 10-year-old pupil of Tajik descent. Many selfies he posted prior to the attack, as well as his manifesto, revealed an obsession with the Christchurch mosque shootings.	1	3
7 February 2026	Ufa, Russia	Bashkir State Medical University attack	A 15-year-old, Alexander S., broke into a Bashkir State Medical University dormitory, where he injured four Indian students with a knife and pepper spray, before injuring two police officers, and himself. Students reported that he shouted various nationalist slogans about the Holocaust and drew a swastika on the wall using the blood of a victim.	0	7 (including the perpetrator)
19 June 2026	Edinburgh, United Kingdom	2026 Edinburgh attacks	A man carried out a stabbing spree targeting Muslim people on the streets of Edinburgh, Scotland, wounding five people. The perpetrator shouted xenophobic and Islamophobic slurs at the time of the arrest. He was detained for terrorist-related offences.	0	5
19 October 2026	Bistrița-Năsăud County and Bistrița, Romania	2026 Bistrița school stabbing	A 13-year-old boy stabbed two people at a school in Bistrița. He intended to murder an Indian immigrant at his school and commit a massacre, but was stopped by a teacher. The investigation revealed that he was inspired by the Christchurch mosque shootings and The Great Replacement theory.	0	3 (including the perpetrator)
23 October 2026	Trappes and La Verrière, France	2026 Trappes and La Verrière shootings	A man, targeting Black and Arab individuals, opened fire from his car at three separate locations between Trappes and La Verrière, killing a person and wounding seven other people.	1	7
