= Armed far-right organizations in Italy =

In the First Italian Republic, after the Second World War, several armed, paramilitary, far-right organizations were active, as well as far-left ones, especially during the Years of Lead from the late 1960s to the late 1980s.

The attempt, in 1960, to include representatives of the Italian Social Movement (MSI), the neo-fascist heir of the National Fascist Party, in the Tambroni Cabinet led to short-lived yet intense anti-fascist rioting. In the second half of the 1960s, widespread labour unrest and co-ordinated agitation of student activist groups along with factory workers and radical leftist organizations, such as Potere Operaio and Lotta Continua, broke out in the country, culminating in the Hot Autumn of 1969, a series of massive strike actions in factories and industrial centres in Northern Italy.

Student strikes and labour strikes, led by workers, leftists, left-sympathising labourers, or Marxist activists, became increasingly common, often deteriorating into clashes between the police and demonstrators composed largely of workers, students, activists, and militants.

During this period of mass social unrest, various far-right organizations emerged in Italy and undertook violent action. Young neo-fascists agitated against the "red threat," perceiving the legalist politics of MSI as abandoning their cause, especially through its ostensible inaction in the face of attacks by the police and the extreme left. (Note: As in the case of the Primavalle arson attack or the Acca Larentia killings.)

Influenced by theories of urban guerrilla warfare and spontaneism, (Note: "Spontaneism" is an idea in communist theory that refers to the unscripted, self-organized uprisings of the masses or—but not necessarily—of the oppressed social classes and has been most famously articulated by communist theoretician and agitator Rosa Luxemburg. Instead of a band of professional revolutionaries, i.e. communist party cadres leading the workers, as envisaged by Lenin, Luxemburg posited that revolutionary consciousness and discipline grow organically from the masses experiencing direct struggle. See The Mass Strike, the Political Party and the Trade Unions (1906). The neo-fascist terrorists in Italy adopted the notion of spontaneism without its original ideological connotations, aiming at a nationalist revolution caused by armed agitation that would inflame the patriotic masses.) a number of neo-fascists moved from street-fighting to armed militancy and terrorism. Small groupings of militarist neofascists are still active in the 21st century.

== Organizations ==
Name in Italian	Flag or symbol	Name translated	Leading figures	Period of activity	Ideology	Principal actions	Political representation, affiliation, or legacy
Associazione Protezione Italiani		Italians' Protection Association		1961–1979	Neo-fascism	Alto Adige bombings (1961)	
Avanguardia Nazionale		National Vanguard	Stefano Delle Chiaie	1970–1972	Neo-Nazism	Reggio revolt (1970), Gioia Tauro train station sabotage (1970), and Peteano massacre (1972)	Comunità Politica di Avanguardia
Falange Armata		Armed Phalanx	SISMI officers	1990–1994	Far-right politics	Assassination of Opera prison educator Umberto Mormile (1990)	
Fasci di Azione Rivoluzionaria		Fasces of Revolutionary Action (Note: Not to be confused with Benito Mussolini's Fasci d'Azione Rivoluzionaria, it was also known as Legione Nera (Black Legion).)	Pino Romualdi	1946– 1947; 1951	Neo-fascism	Attacks against Italy's Ministry of Foreign Affairs and the Embassy of the United States, Rome	
Movimento di Azione Rivoluzionaria		Movement of Revolutionary Action	Carlo Fumagalli; Gaetano Orlando	1962–1974	Neo-fascism	Arson and bombing attacks on Enel pylons (1960s), and arson attack on the Pirelli-Bicocca tire depot in Milan, in which a worker lost his life (1971)	
Movimento Rivoluzionario Popolare		Revolutionary Popular Movement	Paolo Aleandri; Marcello Iannilli	1979–1980	Neo-fascism	Bombing attack at the Capitoline Hill (1979), bombing attack on the Regina Coeli prison (1979), bombing attack against Italy's High Council of the Judiciary (1979), and bombing attempt at the Piazza dell'Indipendenza in Rome, which failed due to bomb malfunction (1979)	
Nuclei Armati Rivoluzionari		Armed Revolutionary Nuclei	Valerio Fioravanti; Francesca Mambro; Massimo Carminati; Alessandro Alibrandi; Franco Anselmi	1977–1981	Neo-fascism	Bologna massacre, a bombing with 85 dead (1980), and assassination of magistrate Mario Amato (1980) and police officer Francesco Evangelista (1980)	
Ordine Nero		Black Order	Fabrizio Zani; Marco Pastori; Adriano Petroni; Luciano Benardelli	1974–1983	Neo-Nazism	Italicus Express bombing (1974), Piazza della Loggia bombing, with 8 people dead and 102 wounded (1974), and assassination of judge Vittorio Occorsio (1976)	
Ordine Nuovo		New Order	Clemente Graziani; Pierluigi Concutelli; Pino Rauti	1965–1973	Neo-Nazism	Piazza Fontana bombing in the headquarters of the Banca Nazionale dell'Agricoltura, with 17 people dead and 88 wounded (1969), and Peteano massacre, with 3 Carabinieri killed and one injured (1972), plus various bombings of trains	Movimento Politico Ordine Nuovo
Terza Posizione		Third Position	Giuseppe Dimitri; Nanni De Angelis; Roberto Fiore; Gabriele Adinolfi; Massimo Morsello	1979–unknown	Neo-fascism	Collaboration with the Armed Revolutionary Nuclei in armed militancy and popularization of the Third Position ideology (Note: The rhetoric of the Third Position developed in Italy and in France. In the 1980s, it was taken up by the National Front in the United Kingdom. In 1983, the National Front was taken over by a Strasserist faction led by Nick Griffin, who presented himself as a Third Positionist.)	Forza Nuova (via Roberto Fiore),CasaPound (via Gabriele Adinolfi)
Partito Nazionalsocialista Italiano dei Lavoratori (Note: Named in direct reference to the German NSDAP (the "National Socialist German Workers' Party").)		Italian National Socialist Workers' Party		2016–2019	Neo-Nazism	Preparation of terrorist acts; illegal possession of firearms	
Nuovo Ordine Sociale/Nuovo Ordine Sociale-Sole Nero (Note: Part of the international terrorist group Atomwaffen Division.)		New Social Order/New Social Order-Black Sun	Andrea Cavalleri	~2021-December 2024	Neo-fascism Neo-Nazism	Plotting to murder prime minister Giorgia Meloni, illegal possession of firearms.	

== See also ==
- Left-wing militant groups in Italy
- Italian fascism
- Post-fascism in Italy
- Radical right (Europe)
- Right-wing terrorism
- Ultranationalism
