= Murder of Valerio Verbano =

1980 murder in Rome, Italy

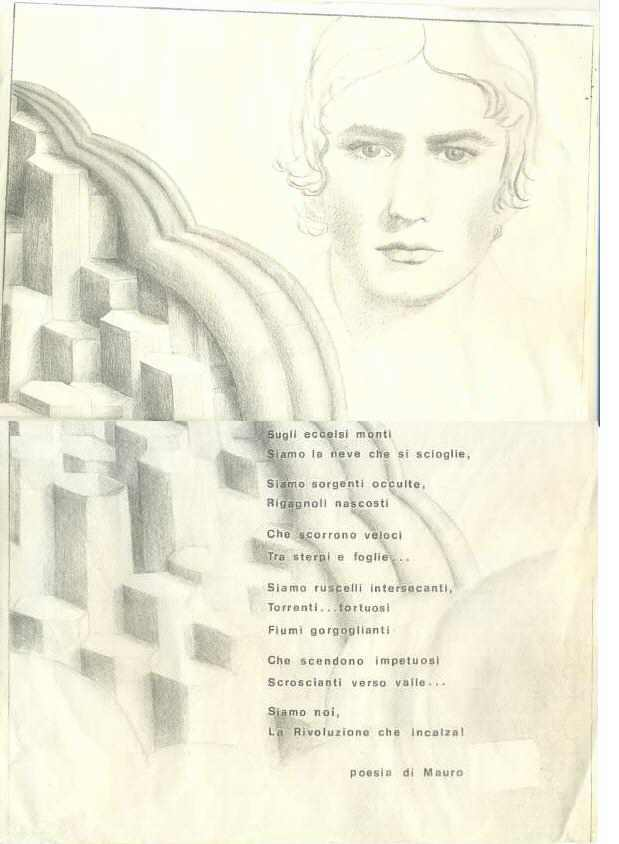
- Portrait of Valerio Verbano and a poem dedicated to him
- Location: Rome, Italy
- Date: 22 February 1980; 13:40
- Target: Valerio Verbano
- Attack type: Assassination
- Perpetrator: Unidentified neo-fascists
- Motive: Political conflict

The murder of Valerio Verbano was committed in Rome on 22 February 1980. A militant associated with the Autonomia Operaia (Workers' Autonomy) area, he was killed by a gunshot in an ambush by three armed men who had entered his home on Via Monte Bianco wearing masks. Despite lengthy and repeated investigations, statements from various pentiti (informants), and multiple claims of responsibility sent to the law enforcement in the days following the murder—while the neofascist origin is considered certain—the motive and perpetrators have never been established, and all inquiries have failed to produce a judicial truth.

== Background ==
=== Early life and activism ===
Born in Rome on 25 February 1961 into a petit bourgeois family of anti-fascist background, with a father employed by the Ministry of the Interior and a member of the Italian Communist Party, and a mother who was a nurse, Valerio Verbano began his political engagement in 1975 within the autonomous collective of his school, the Liceo Scientifico Archimede, located in the Nuovo Salario quarter of Rome. His active militancy, which sometimes put his physical safety at risk, extended beyond school through his involvement with the Comitato di lotta valmelaina, a local branch of Autonomia Operaia.

Like many boys his age, alongside his political commitment, he had other passions from childhood, including sports (particularly martial arts like judo and karate), music (The Beatles, Pink Floyd), and supporting his favourite football team, AS Roma. Through another of his interests, photography, he began documenting the political events of the time and compiled a personal investigation into the far-right movements in the capital.

On 20 April 1979, Verbano was arrested by police along with four other boys while, outside an abandoned farmhouse near the Roman borgata of Fidene, they were about to manufacture incendiary devices (some Molotov cocktails). The search carried out by the authorities immediately after the arrest at his home at Via Monte Bianco 114, where Verbano lived with his parents, led to the discovery and seizure of a firearm with an erased serial number (a Beretta 6.35) and documentary material, including several dossiers compiled by Verbano profiling far-right extremists. Tried, on 22 December 1979 he was sentenced to seven months' imprisonment to be served in the Roman prison of Regina Coeli.

=== The murder ===
I had a son, Valerio, who filled our lives, and they killed him. He fell on the sofa in that corner, his head where that stuffed kitten is now. It was the fascists, perhaps for revenge, because Valerio was part of Autonomia, or perhaps out of fear. Valerio was their sworn enemy, he was compiling a dossier on the fascists in the neighbourhood, who knows? But since that day we have lived with one purpose: to discover the truth about our son. To give a name to the three assassins who killed him before our eyes. If his death remains a mystery, my son would be killed a second time.

— Sardo Verbano

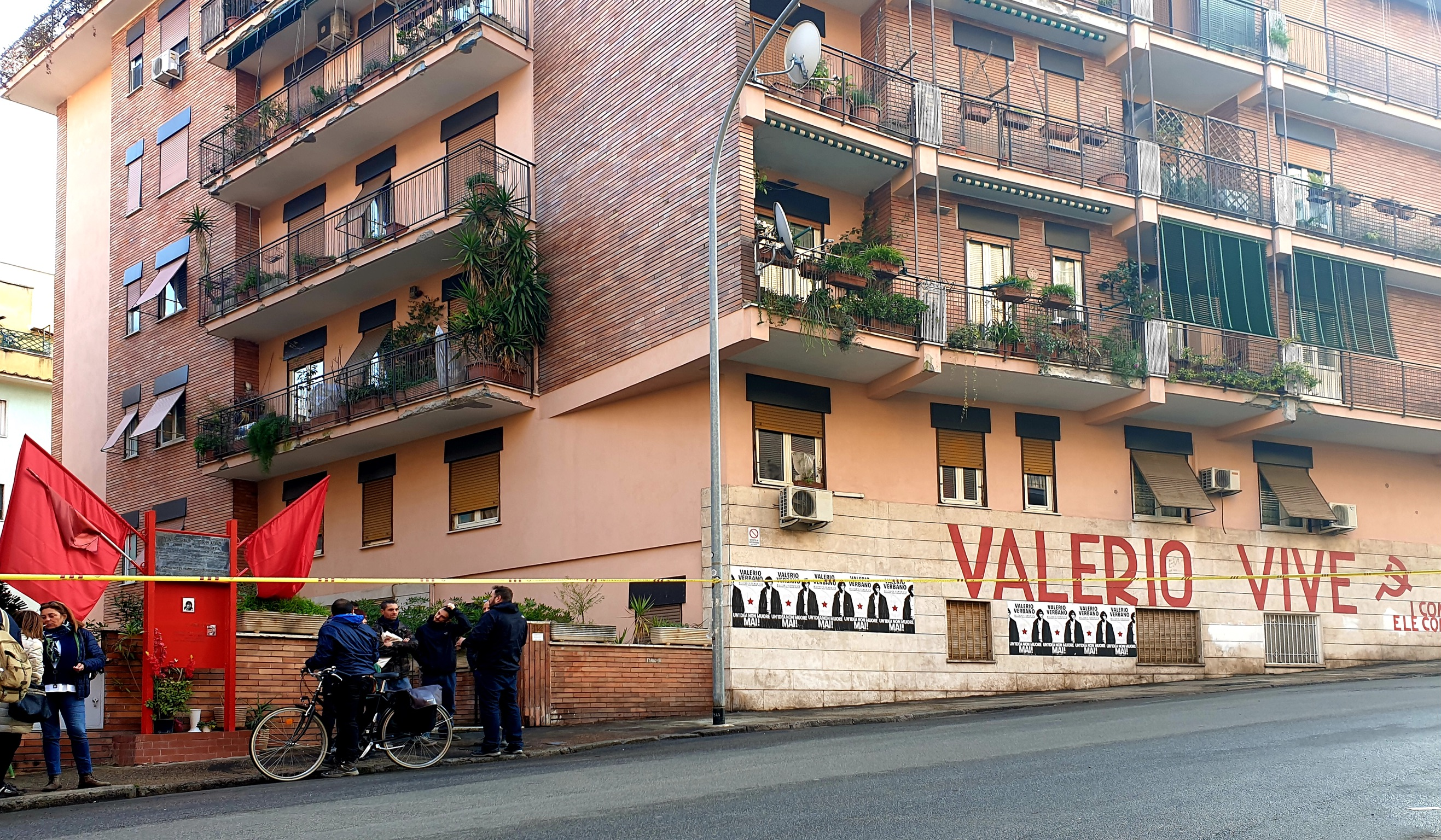
Valerio Verbano's home on 22 February 2019, the anniversary of his killing

On 22 February 1980, around 12:44, three young armed men, their faces covered by balaclavas, gained entry to the Verbano home on the fourth floor of Via Monte Bianco 114, in the Monte Sacro district of Rome. Posing as friends of the son, they convinced Verbano's parents to open the door; once inside the apartment, armed with pistols fitted with silencers, the three tied up and gagged the parents, who were immobilised with adhesive tape and taken to their bedroom. They then waited for Valerio to return home from school.

Upon his return around 13:40, as he opened the door, Verbano was immediately attacked by the three. In the ensuing struggle, Verbano managed to disarm one of the assailants and attempted to escape through a window. He was, however, hit by a gunshot to the back that perforated his intestines and caused him to fall seriously wounded onto the living room sofa. When the attackers fled in confusion, they left behind in the apartment a balaclava, a .38 calibre pistol with a silencer, a dog leash, a pair of sunglasses, and a shirt button.

Alerted by the gunshot, neighbours who rushed to the Verbano apartment immediately after the killers' flight worked to free the parents and provide first aid to the boy, to no avail. He died shortly afterwards, even before being loaded into the ambulance that would have taken him to the hospital.

The murder had a huge impact in the city, also due to Verbano's political militancy. On 25 February, the day of the funeral (and his birthday), several episodes of violence by groups linked to Autonomia were harshly repressed with charges and tear gas by the police, even inside the Verano cemetery where Verbano was buried. From the windows of the police station in San Lorenzo, a district adjacent to the cemetery, several pistol shots were even fired at the funeral procession.

=== Claims of responsibility ===
On the same day as the murder, at 20:00, the first claim arrived, signed by a self-styled left-wing formation, the "Gruppo Proletario Organizzato Armato" (Organised Armed Proletarian Group), which stated it had intended to strike a spy, an informer, a police servant: in the statement, the murder was described as a mistake, compared to the initial intention to punish him by kneecapping.

An hour later, around 21:00, a second claim arrived signed by the Nuclei Armati Rivoluzionari (NAR), the leading far-right extremist group of the time: "We have executed Valerio Verbano, instigator of the Cecchetti murder. The bullet that killed him is a .38 calibre. We left a .765 calibre [pistol] in the apartment. The police hid it". And again signed by the NAR (Thor, Balder and Tir commands), around 12:00 the next day, a second claim was delivered which, without explicitly mentioning the Verbano murder, alluded to "the hammer of Thor that struck at Montesacro".

Ten days later, a further leaflet again signed by the NAR appeared in Padua, categorically denying the terrorist group's involvement in the Verbano murder. Investigators, who ruled out the authenticity of this last leaflet, confirmed the first, telephonic claim by the NAR as the most probable. At the time of that call, the reference to the .38 calibre of the pistol used for the assassination, which was indeed the one used in the ambush, had not yet been confirmed in the official autopsy report by the coroner.

== Investigations ==
The investigation into Verbano's murder was entrusted to Judge Claudio D'Angelo. The initial inquiries were based on the testimony of a neighbour of the boy who told investigators that he had encountered the probable killers fleeing near the Verbano residence and recognised them as the same youths who, the day before the murder, had been loitering in front of an arcade with Verbano. Based on his testimony, an identikit of the three was drawn up, before the man himself decided to retract his statements, perhaps after being threatened.

Investigators also tried to determine if the killing originated from those dossiers compiled by Verbano and seized by the authorities during the search months earlier. Verbano's father, Sardo, also decided to conduct his own investigation, creating a sort of memoir in which he hypothesised specific motives for his son's death. Simultaneously, some pentiti from the Roman far-right area made statements regarding the Verbano murder.

Many have been the right-wing and left-wing pentiti who have tried to reconstruct the dynamics of those years. Only a few murders have not found a paternity despite the numerous confessions made by many people, and among the very few is that of Valerio Verbano.

— Giancarlo Capaldo, magistrate

In 1981, as part of the investigation into the Bologna massacre, almost by chance, information interesting for the Verbano case came to light: Laura Lauricella, the partner of Egidio Giuliani, a prominent figure in the Roman right, recounted that Giuliani had provided a silencer to Verbano's presumed killer. The exchange was said to have taken place at the Roman shooting range of Tor di Quinto, where many Roman neofascists used to meet. Lauricella reported that Giuliani himself had built that silencer before handing it over to another Roman neofascist, Roberto Nistri (who, incidentally, at the time of the murder had been detained for over two months: arrested on 14 December 1979 while transporting an arsenal, he was released in March 1981), a prominent member of Terza Posizione. Questioned by Judge D'Angelo, both Nistri and Giuliani denied any involvement and requested a confrontation with Lauricella, which never took place.

On 30 September 1982, the pentito Walter Sordi, a former terrorist of the NAR, gave new statements about the Verbano murder, reporting some confidences from another NAR exponent, Pasquale Belsito: "It was Belsito who told me that in his opinion the perpetrators of the Verbano murder were to be identified as the brothers Claudio and Stefano Bracci and Massimo Carminati". On 25 January 1984, in the only interrogation Claudio Bracci underwent, the Roman neofascist denied any involvement, even claiming not to know Belsito, and in October of that same year, Carminati also took an identical stance.

Angelo Izzo, perpetrator in 1975 of the Circeo massacre and in 2005 of the double murder of Maria Carmela Linciano and her daughter Valentina Maiorano, also joined the ranks of alleged informants, reporting to the investigating magistrates some revelations made to him by Luigi Ciavardini, a former militant of Terza Posizione who later joined the NAR. Izzo, a controversial and ambiguous figure in the world of pentitismo who at the time presented himself as a witness in countless criminal acts of far-right extremism between the mid-1970s and early 1980s, stated that "Ciavardini told me that the murder was to be traced back to militants of Terza Posizione, he told me that the instigator was certainly Nanni De Angelis. As for the perpetrators, he told me that they were certainly members of the group led by Fabrizio Zani. Only a bungler like Zani could lose the pistol during the struggle with Verbano". However, Izzo's statements also found no reliable probative support.

The preliminary investigation was closed in 1989, and Judge D'Angelo, while deeming certain the "criminal environment" linked to far-right extremism, stated the impossibility of identifying the perpetrators. At the end of the investigations, various pieces of evidence were also destroyed: the two balaclavas and the dog leash left by the killers during their escape, as well as the adhesive tape used to immobilise the parents. All inquiries into the murder failed to produce any judicial truth.

In 1997, Milanese judge Guido Salvini, as part of the investigation into the killing of Fausto and Iaio, killed in Milan with eight gunshots on 18 March 1978, suggesting a link between the two killings, requested from the Office for Physical Evidence of the Rome court the pistol with a silencer abandoned by the killers in Verbano's home, to have it examined. But the probative evidence had mysteriously disappeared.

In February 2011, the Public Prosecutor's Office in Rome confirmed the reopening of the investigation. Deputy Prosecutor Pietro Saviotti and prosecutor Erminio Amelio stated they had entered two names in the register of suspects.

== The "Verbano dossier" ==
Since 1977, Valerio Verbano had been engaged in a series of personal investigations aimed at gathering information on the Roman far-right milieu.

In counter-information, we documented, photographed... we were organised like a small secret service, extremely efficient in our own small way. We would approach far-right demonstrations or their meeting places. We took photos and then tried to identify them. We collected all newspaper articles that talked about the far right, about arrests. We had a photographic archive and a historical one with all the events of the far right and about informers infiltrated in far-right circles. Everything ended up in a notebook where all these people were catalogued. At that time, there was a feeling that a right-wing coup could happen in Italy at any moment. So we had to prepare to counter it in some way. We had the example of Chile, Argentina. The data was useful if something happened.

— Testimony of a friend of Verbano

Thanks to that collected data, supplemented by extensive photographic material, Verbano then prepared hundreds of files and dossiers in which he gave an identity and a face to various far-right militants in Rome, especially those living in the triangle formed by the Trieste/Salario-Talenti-Montesacro districts.

Those documents had then been found by police officers during the search of his parents' apartment carried out the day after his arrest for manufacturing and possessing incendiary material on 20 April 1979. The existence of these dossiers became known to Judge Mario Amato, one of the magistrates investigating right-wing terrorism at the time, who was later killed by a NAR commando on 23 June 1980.

After the seizure, the material mysteriously disappeared into the depths of judicial depositories. The disappearance was later reported, on 26 February 1980, even by the Verbano family's lawyers, as they were aware of both the list and the content of the material: in October 1980 they unsuccessfully requested its release from seizure and return, denied by the investigating judge because the material was still subject to judicial secrecy.

Four years later, on 11 April 1984, the same Court of Appeal that had tried Verbano ordered its destruction, despite these papers having been re-catalogued in the investigation opened for his murder. The actual destruction took place only on 7 July 1987.

Extensive excerpts from these dossiers (in photocopy) suddenly reappeared in February 2011 from the Carabinieri archives and entered the case file of the murder investigation at the time of its reopening by the Rome Prosecutor's Office. The 379 sheets that make up the content of those documents, almost all handwritten by Verbano, contain about 900 names of far-right activists, accompanied by addresses and (in some cases) telephone numbers. Another 16 sheets, transcribed by several hands, contain notes, political affiliation cards, maps of streets and squares of some far-right meeting places in Rome.

Among the names are those of activists of the time who later became professional politicians, such as Teodoro Buontempo and Francesco Storace, the latter indicated as an individual who "wears Lozza prescription glasses, secretary FdG Acca Larentia, chubby"; or also figures already known for their leadership role in neofascist organisations of the time, such as Paolo Signorelli, Stefano Delle Chiaie or Alessandro Alibrandi. The dossiers also include the names of far-right activists later killed during the Years of lead, such as Luca Perucci, killed in 1981, or Angelo Mancia, murdered on 12 March 1980 most likely to avenge the Verbano murder itself.

== Legacy ==
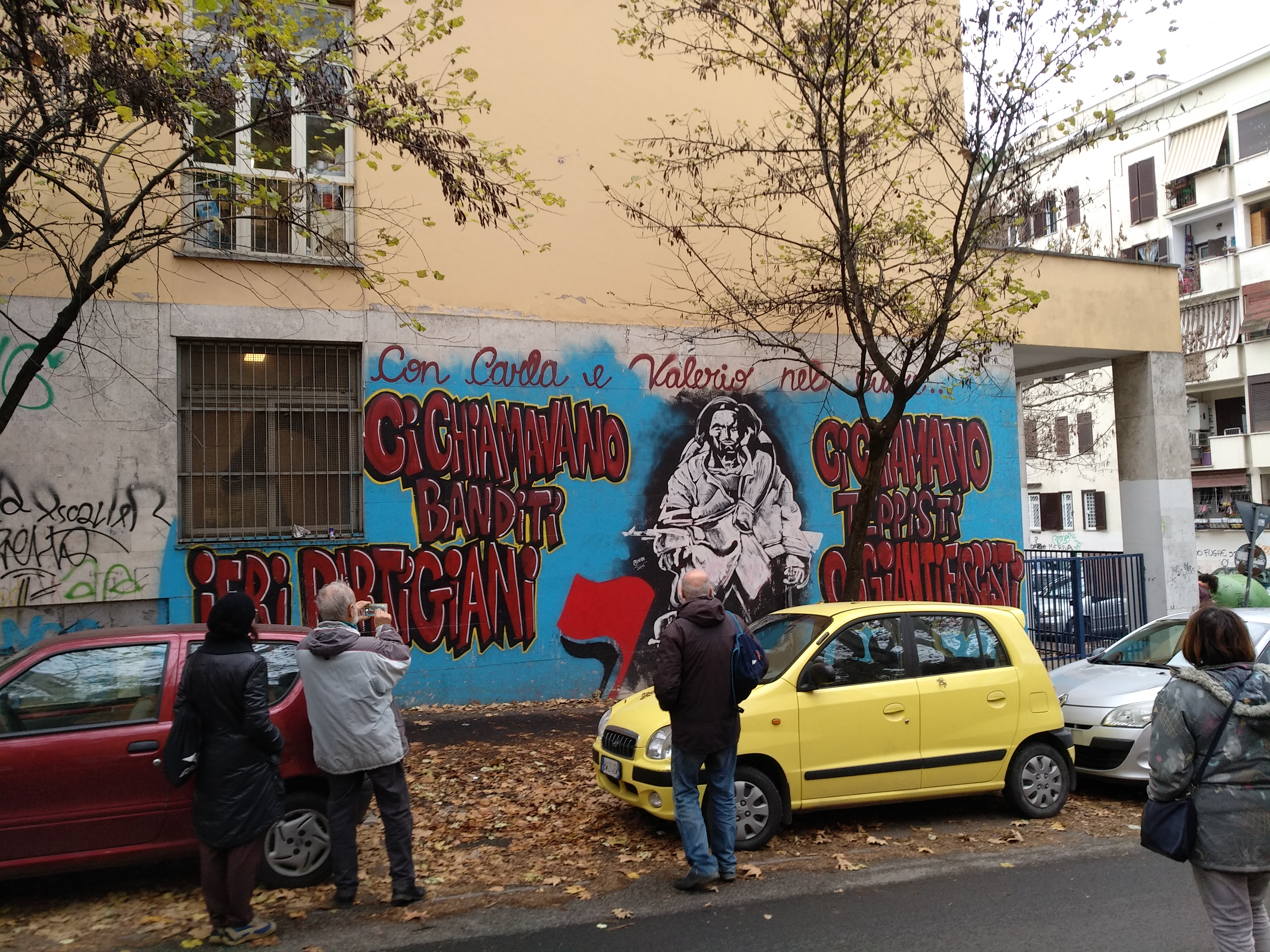
Mural in the Tufello quarter, 2018

On 25 February 2006, in the presence of then-mayor Walter Veltroni, a street in Rome was dedicated to the memory of Valerio Verbano with the placement of a plaque in Parco delle Valli. On 8 August 2013, the plaque was destroyed by unknown individuals in what Mayor Ignazio Marino commented as "an offence to the city's memory".

In January 2009, the Province of Rome inaugurated the first edition of the Premio Valerio Verbano, a competition organised in collaboration with five provincial vocational training centres, open to young people aged 14 to 18, which involved the submission of self-produced short films and multimedia projects, for the award of a scholarship.

On 21 November 2009, a street in Scampia (in Naples) was named in memory of Valerio Verbano.

On 1 December 2012, in Naples, the occupied Auditorium of via Mezzocannone was named after Valerio Verbano and his mother Carla.

On 22 February 2021, the anniversary of his killing, the artist Jorit created a mural depicting his face on the facade of a building in Rome.

== See also ==
- Terrorism in Italy
- Years of Lead (Italy)

== Bibliography ==
- Cingolani, Giorgio; Pino Adriano (2000). Corpi di reato. Quattro storie degli anni di piombo. Costa & Nolan. ISBN 978-88-489-0037-9.
- Verbano, Carla; Alessandro Capponi (2010). Sia folgorante la fine. Rizzoli. ISBN 978-88-17-03844-7.
- Lazzaretti, Valerio (2011). Valerio Verbano. Ucciso da chi, come, perché. Odradekid. ISBN 978-88-96487-15-0.
- Capoccetti Boccia, Marco (2011). Valerio Verbano: Una ferita ancora aperta. Passione e morte di un militante comunista. Castelvecchi. ISBN 978-88-7615-441-6.
