= Felice Casson =

Italian magistrate and politician

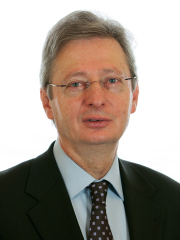

Member of the Senate of the Republic
- In office 28 April 2006 – 22 March 2018
- Constituency: Veneto

Personal details
- Born: 5 August 1953 (age 72) Chioggia, Province of Venice, Republic of Italy
- Party: Democratic Party
- Education: Padua University

Felice Casson (born 5 August 1953) is an Italian professor and former magistrate and politician. From 2006 to 2018, he was a member of the Senate of the Italian Republic representing the Region of Veneto.

While investigating the 1972 Peteano bombing, Casson discovered the existence of Operation Gladio, a "stay-behind" NATO anti-communist army during the Cold War. The explosives used in the attack, for which two neo-fascists were convicted, supposedly came from a NATO arms cache. 622 Gladio members, including two people who served as prime minister and president, were exposed in the course of the investigation.

== Biography ==
Casson obtained a law degree from Padua University and entered the magistracy in 1980 as an investigating magistrate. He was subsequently appointed as responsible for preliminary investigations and was public prosecutor in Venice from 1993 to 2005.

He has been on leave since 2006 following his election to the Italian Parliament. In 2008 he was re-elected to the Senate and elected vice president of the Democratic Party Group. As a magistrate, among the many investigations conducted by Casson - especially in the field of terrorism, the fight against corruption, environmental security, and the protection of workers and citizens from exposure to carcinogenic agents - are those on the Peteano massacre, disloyalty of the intelligence service and the State apparatus, terrorism and radical right-wing and international subversive organisations, global trade in warfare material, the GLADIO case, political corruption in the Veneto region, the fire of La Fenice Theatre in Venice, the trials over deaths from VCM, PVC and asbestos in Marghera, investigations into environmental pollution, disorders caused by depleted uranium and radio spectrum pollution.

As a Senator, he was a member of the following committees: Committee on Elections and Parliamentary Immunity, Committee on the Prosecution of Government Members, Standing Commission on the Justice, Committee of Inquiry into Depleted Uranium and the Committee on Workplace Deaths. During this time, he introduced and promoted bills related to the fight against corruption and organized crime, the streamlining of civil and criminal law proceedings, safety and prevention measures for workers exposed to genotoxic, carcinogenic substances such asbestos and VCM, environmental crime, population safety and the protection of crime victims.

Casson taught Environmental Law at the Venice Istituto Universitario di Architettura and the Università telematica internazionale Uninettuno. He is also a member of the scientific board of the Venice International Academy of Environmental Sciences (IAES). He appears in the 2009 documentary de:Plastic Planet, directed by de:Werner Boote.

== Bibliography ==
- Lo stato violato (1985 - "The Raped State")
- Servizi segreti e il segreto di stato (1992 - "Secret Services and State Secret")
- La fabbrica dei veleni (2007 - "The poison factory")
