= Nazzareno De Angelis =

Italian opera singer (1881–1962)

Nazzareno De Angelis (17 November 1881 – 14 December 1962) was an Italian operatic bass, particularly associated with Verdi, Rossini and Wagner roles.

He was the grandfather of the nationalist militants Nanni and Marcello De Angelis.

== Career ==
De Angelis was born at L'Aquila, Abruzzo. During his 36-year career, De Angelis appeared on stage on more than 1500 occasions, performing a repertoire of 57 different operas. He was especially celebrated for his powerful portrayal of the title role in Arrigo Boito's Mefistofele, which he sang at least 500 times between 1906 and 1938.

De Angelis began his working life as an apprentice printer, while his first serious exposure to music came in local choirs as a boy soprano. Earning praise for the excellence of his voice, he became a part of the choir of the Giulia Chapel and later the Sistine Chapel in the Vatican. He left the choir at puberty and began studying with Dr. Faberi at the Accademia di Santa Cecilia in Rome. For several years he and his teachers were uncertain about his true voice type, and he studied both baritone and bass parts. Eventually, it became clear that although the upper part of his voice was produced freely and easily he was more comfortable when singing in the lower bass tessitura. De Angelis spent his last two years at the Accademia developing his repertoire and performing in a number of recitals.

He made his professional opera début at the Comunale of L'Aquila in May 1903 in a production of Donizetti's Linda di Chamounix as the Prefect. A month later he performed in another opera at that theater, Emilio Usiglio's Le educante di Sorrento. Impressed with his performances, the management of Rome's Teatro Quirino immediately engaged De Angelis to play Oroveso in Bellini's Norma in July 1903. Later that year, he appeared in two productions at the Teatro Adriano: as Il Spettro in Ambroise Thomas's Hamlet opposite Maria Barrientos as Ofelia and Mattia Battistini as Hamlet, and also as Sparafucile in Verdi's Rigoletto.

De Angelis toured The Netherlands during 1905. After this De Angelis was quickly invited to all the major opera houses of Italy, making his debut at La Scala in 1907 and appearing often under the baton of La Scala's principal conductor, Arturo Toscanini. In 1913, he created there the role of Archibaldo in Montemezzi's L'amore dei tre re. He also sang at the Paris Opéra, in 1909, as the High Priest in Spontini's La vestale. Other than singing at the Chicago Grand Opera Company during 1910-11 and the Chicago Opera Association 1915–1920, De Angelis's career was based almost entirely in Europe. He did, however, make a sequence of acclaimed appearances at the Teatro Colón in Buenos Aires, beginning with the 1911 season.

Outside the mainstream repertoire, he was admired for his portrayals of Creon in Medea (the Italian version of Cherubini French opera Médée) and Mosè in Mosè in Egitto.

De Angelis' voice showed signs of 'roughness' and deterioration during the 1930s and he retired from the operatic stage in 1939. Although he gave a few concerts during the 1940s, he henceforth concentrated his activities on providing voice lessons to pupils in Milan and Rome. He died in the latter city in 1962.

== Recordings ==
De Angelis possessed one of the most impressive bass voices produced by Italy, although he was not considered by critics to be a particularly suave stylist or subtle interpretive artist. His was a big, dark and well blended vocal instrument with strong top notes and plenty of stamina and carrying power. Chronologically, De Angelis succeeded the famous late-19th-century basses Francesco Navarini and Vittorio Arimondi and anticipated the rise to prominence in the 1920s of Ezio Pinza and Tancredi Pasero.

He cut his first audio discs in 1907/08 for Fonotipia Records and his last in the late 1920s and early '30s for Columbia Records. In 1931, he recorded Mefistofele in Milan for Columbia's Italian label. It is the only role that he recorded in its entirety.

Selections from his recorded output, consisting mainly of operatic arias and duets by Meyerbeer, Halévy, Verdi, Puccini, Wagner, Gounod, Thomas, Boito, Rossini, and Weber, have been issued by Preiser Records (Lebendige Vergangenheit) on two separate CDs (numbers 89042 and 89507). His complete Mefistofele was issued on CD by the Naxos Records in 2003 (number: 8.110273-74).

== Sources ==
- Le guide de l'opéra, les indispensables de la musique, R. Mancini & J-J. Rouvereux, (Fayard, 1986) ISBN 2-213-01563-5
