= 1987 Athens bus bombings =

Bus bombings in Athens, Greece

- Location: Athens, Greece
- Date: 24 April and 10 August 1987; 5:10 pm & 4:48 pm (UTC+01:00)
- Target: Americans
- Attack type: Bombing
- Weapon: Improvised explosive device
- Deaths: 0
- Injuries: 30
- Perpetrator: Revolutionary Organization 17 November

On 24 April and 10 August 1987, two bombings took place on buses carrying American military personnel in Athens, Greece. Both attacks were carried out by Revolutionary Organization 17 November.

The first attack, on 24 April 1987, wounded 16 Americans (four of which were civilians) and two Greeks (the bus driver and a civilian car driver nearby). A Hellenic Air Force bus was transporting 35 American servicemen from a Greek base to the American-operated Hellenikon Air Base when a remote-controlled bomb, planted on a wall near the roadside, exploded, causing the bus to lose control and hit a tree while traveling in Piraeus. It was initially reported the bus was hit by a rocket attack. The chief of Greece's police called it a "well-planned crime". Greek Prime Minister Andreas Papandreou condemned the attack.

The second attack happened on 10 August 1987, and injured 11 Americans (one a female civilian) and the Greek bus driver. The attack happened near Voula beach to the south of Athens and was again caused by a remote-controlled car bomb on the road the bus was travelling on.

The far-left 17 November Group had previously launched attacks against American targets in Greece.

== See also ==
- 1985 Athens bar bombing
