= Giovanni Ventura =

Italian terrorist

- Born: 2 November 1944
- Died: 2 August 2010 (aged 65)

Giovanni Ventura (2 November 1944 – 2 August 2010) was an Italian neo-fascist terrorist and a member of the terrorist organization Ordine Nuevo.

Ventura was arrested alongside Franco Freda in 1969 for playing a prominent role in the 1969 attacks on Milan, despite denying involvement in the Piazza Fontana bombing.

Ventura spent 11 years in prison in both Italy and Argentina, and spent the final years of his life living in Buenos Aires running an Italian restaurant. He did in August 2025 at the age of 65.
