= 2022 Paris shooting =

Mass shooting in Paris, France

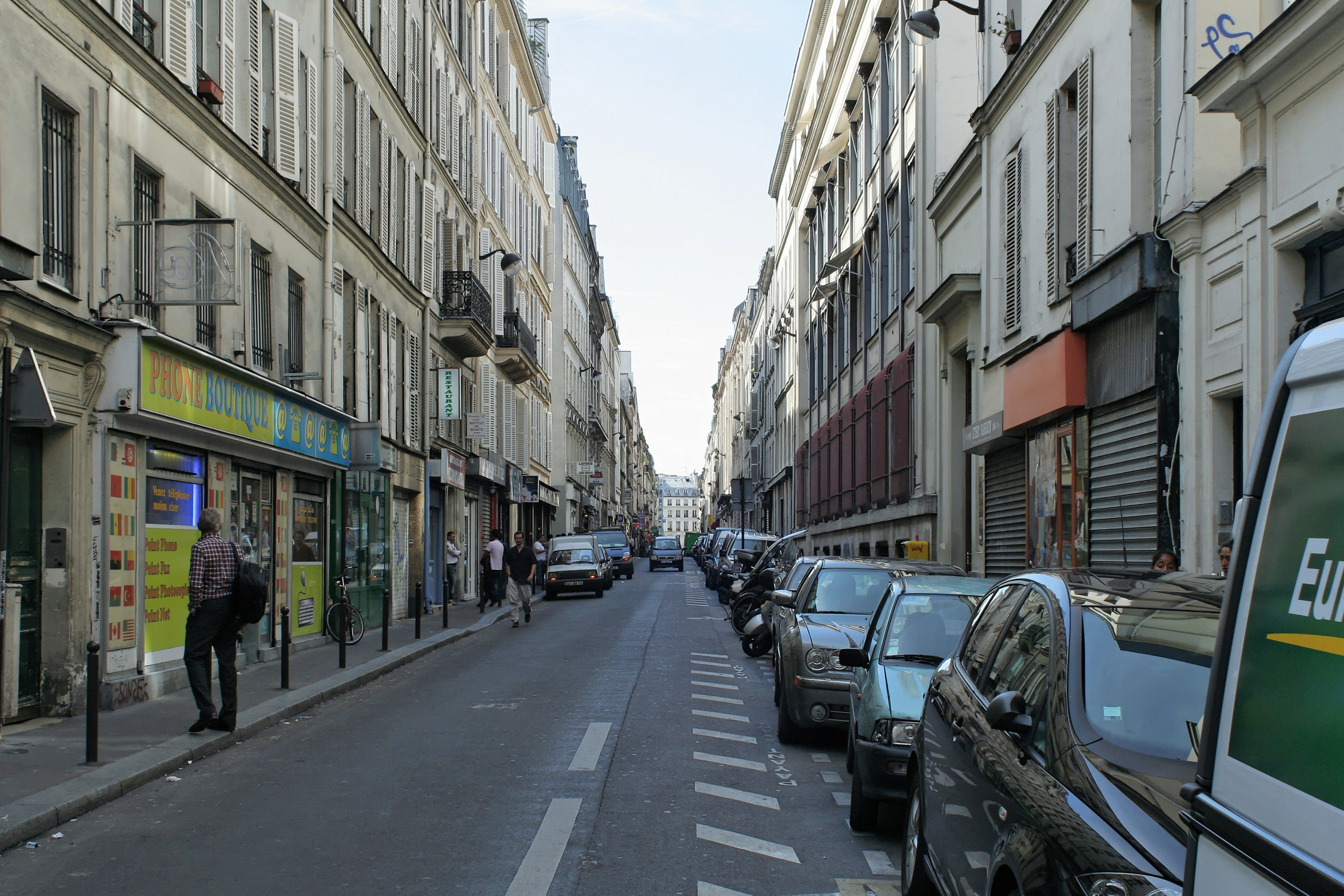
- General view of the rue d'Enghien from the crossroads with rue du Faubourg-Saint-Denis.
- Location: 48°52′19″N 02°21′06″E; 10th arrondissement of Paris, France
- Date: 23 December 2022; 10:40 CET (UTC+1)
- Target: Kurdish people
- Attack type: Mass shooting, right-wing terrorism
- Weapon: .45 Colt handgun
- Deaths: 3
- Injuries: 4 (including the suspect)
- Perpetrator: William Mallet
- Motive: Anti-Kurdish sentiment, racism, xenophobia

On 23 December 2022, a mass shooting occurred at three Kurdish locations in the 10th arrondissement of Paris, France. Three people were killed and three others were wounded in and around a Kurdish cultural center on Rue d'Enghien.

Investigators believe the shooting to be an act of right-wing terrorism. The suspect, 69-year-old William Mallet, has confessed to having been motivated by racism, and declared that he "didn't like the Kurds".

== Background ==
The attack came as right-wing violence is on the rise in France. The attack also comes almost ten years after the triple murder against Kurdish activists in January 2013.

== Shooting ==
The mass shooting took place on 23 December 2022, shortly before noon, on Rue d'Enghien in the 10th arrondissement of Paris, near the Ahmet Kaya Kurdish Cultural Centre. The assailant, armed with a Colt 45, fired three shots towards the cultural center, killing two people. He next fired three shots in the direction of a Kurdish restaurant opposite the cultural center, killing one person. He then fired three shots into a Kurdish hairdressing salon, wounding three people.

== Victims ==
Three people were killed in the shooting: Emine Kara, the head of the Kurdish women's movement in France; a Kurdish singer-songwriter and political refugee; and an elderly man who was a regular at the cultural center.

Three others were wounded, including one in critical condition. The assailant, before his arrest, was wounded in the face.

== Suspect ==
The suspect, 69-year-old William Mallet (born 30 March 1953) of Montreuil, Seine-Saint-Denis, was arrested at the crime scene. He was quickly identified due to an SNCF ID card that was found in his wallet. At the time of his arrest, he had a briefcase which contained two or three loaded magazines and a box of 45 caliber cartridges with at least 25 cartridges inside it. Mallet is a retired SNCF train driver, and he lived in the 10th arrondissement.

During the investigation, he said that he would have first "sought to shoot foreigners in Saint Denis" before he changed his mind and decided to target the Kurdish community in the 10th arrondissement, faced with the lack of people in the streets.

In 2016, he stabbed a burglar with a kitchen knife, and he was sentenced to twelve months in prison in June 2021. In 2017, he was sentenced to six months in prison for prohibited possession of weapons. In 2021, he attacked a migrant camp in Bercy with a sword, injuring three migrants and tearing down six tents. He was under investigation for "racist violence with weapons". During the hearings before the investigating judge, he made profane remarks of "unambiguous racism", and he was released on 12 December 2022 and placed under judicial supervision. Despite those legal convictions, he was never registered in the FINIADA (a national file of persons who are prohibited from acquiring and possessing weapons) and no search had been carried out at his home.

A firearms enthusiast and a sport shooter, he said he obtained the Colt 45 used in the shooting from a friend he had met at a shooting club in Versailles. At the time of his arrest, the gunman had two or three magazines loaded with 14 rounds, as well as an additional 25 rounds. He allegedly said that he acted because he was a "racist", and he made incoherent remarks during his arrest, telling the police that he "didn't like Kurds".

Interior Minister Gerald Darmanin stated that the suspect was not the subject of a file which is linked to the "ultra-right" and he also stated that the suspect "was not known to the intelligence services, nor to the Directorate General of Homeland Security". He stated that the suspect was "obviously looking to prey on foreigners" and he also stated that the suspect "acted alone".

== Investigation and legal ==
An investigation of assassination, intentional homicide, aggravated violence, and weapons violations was opened and allocated to the criminal brigade of the DRPJ.

On 24 December, the suspect was released from police custody and placed under psychiatric evaluation.

== Reactions ==
President of France, Emmanuel Macron said on X; “the Kurds of France” had been “the target of a vile attack in the heart of Paris”. He said his thoughts were with the victims, the wounded and their families, and thanked the police.

== Aftermath ==
During Darmanin's visit to the crime scene on 23 December, police clashed with Kurdish protestors, firing tear gas at them. Hundreds of Kurds gathered outside the center and in neighboring streets to protest the shootings, clashing with security forces, throwing stones and garbage cans. The clashes injured eleven officers, according to the French police. There were further violent protests on 24 December. Representatives of the local Kurdish community were not satisfied with the investigation's focus on the French assailant and deemed a possible involvement of the Turkish Government be included in the investigation. It was announced that in France, Kurdish community centers would be guarded 24 hours a day to prevent a similar event. Similar steps were announced for Turkish diplomatic missions.

Following the attack, Turkey asked France to restrict the "anti-Turkish" activity of Kurdistan Workers' Party (PKK), France's ambassador to Turkey was summoned by the Turkish Foreign Ministry, to express Turkey's displeasure with the PKK's "black propaganda" against Turkey.

== See also ==
- Triple murder of Kurdish activists in Paris in January 2013
- List of terrorist incidents in France
