= 2023 Tours bombing =

Bombing attack in France

Coordinates: 47°23′44.8″N 0°40′46.1″E

- Location: Tours, France
- Date: 23 May 2023
- Target: LGBT center of Tours
- Weapon: Explosive device
- Deaths: 0
- Injuries: 0
- Motive: Anti-LGBT

On May 23, 2023, an individual attacked the LGBT center in Tours, France, with an explosive device containing acid and aluminum. The attack resulted in no casualties as the people inside the center managed to move away from the device. An investigation for attempted murder has been opened.

On June 1, 2023, the prime suspect, a 17-year-old integralist, was arrested.

== Background ==
In 2022 and 2023, violence and attacks targeting LGBT centers and members have been on the rise in France. Specifically, the LGBT center of Tours has experienced six attacks between January and May 2023. This is part of a broader resurgence of terrorist acts and far-right violence in France.

== Chronology ==
On May 23, 2023, around 3:30 PM, a masked individual threw a bottle containing acid and aluminum, an explosive mixture, at the LGBT center of Tours. After the two employees and a volunteer inside went out to investigate, the perpetrator allegedly said, "Good luck" before fleeing. The device then delayed in detonating, allowing the three volunteers to seek shelter. The center suffered significant damage as a result of the attack.

== Legal proceedings ==
The prefect of Indre-et-Loire and the mayor of Tours visited the site shortly after the attack. An investigation for "attempted murder" has been opened by the judicial police and the Central Office for the Fight against Crimes against Humanity and Hate Crimes (OCLCH).

=== Suspect ===
The suspect, a 17-year-old integralist, was arrested on June 1, 2023, and placed in police custody. After a search at his residence, the police discovered hydrochloric acid and a manual used for bomb-making.
