= Ahmet Kaya Kurdish Cultural Centre =

Cultural center in Paris, France

The Ahmet Kaya Kurdish Cultural Centre (French: Centre culturel kurde Ahmet-Kaya; Kurdish, Kurmanji: Navenda çanda Kurd a Ahmet Kaya) is a Kurdish cultural center located in on Rue d'Enghien in the 10th arrondissement of Paris, France. Established in Paris on 10 May 2001, the Ahmet Kaya Kurdish Cultural Centre promotes Kurdish culture, language, and the integration of Kurds in France.

== History ==
The center is located in the 10th arrondissement of Paris, at 16 Rue d'Enghien. The center is named posthumously in honor of the Turkish-Kurdish folk singer and composer, Ahmet Kaya, who was the son of a Kurdish father and Turkish mother. Kaya died of a heart attack on 16 November 2000 while living in exile from Turkey.

== The 2022 Attack ==
On 23 December 2022, the Ahmet Kaya Kurdish Cultural Centre was the target of a mass shooting attack. Three people were killed in the attack on the center and two adjoining Kurdish businesses, a hairdressing salon and the Avesta Cuisine Traditionnelle Kurde restaurant on Rue d'Enghien.

== Cultural and Artistic Activities ==
- Kurdish Language Courses
- French Language Courses
- Folklore Dance Courses
- Music Classes Conferences
- Workshops, Seminars Concerts and Performances
- Art Exhibition
- Cinema Screenings
