= Piazza dell'Indipendenza (Rome) =

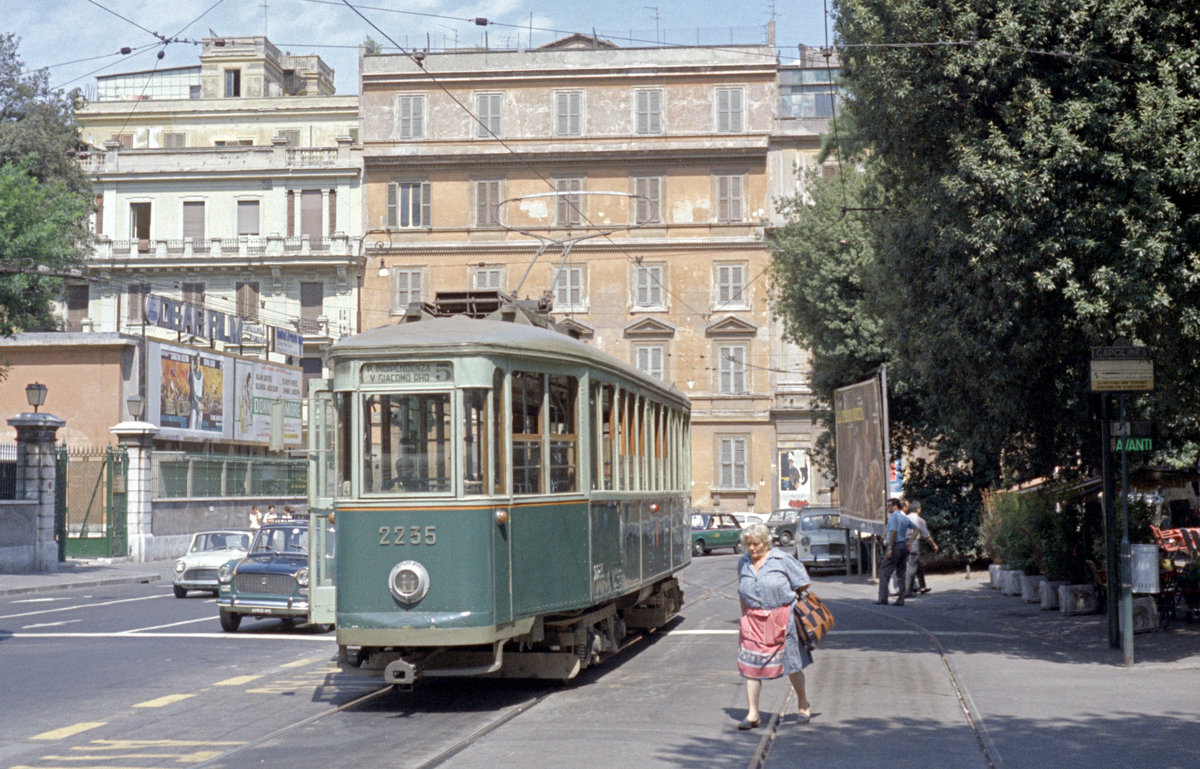
- View of the square (1970)
- Interactive map of Piazza dell'Indipendenza
- Location: Rome, Italy
- Postal code: 00185
- Coordinates: 41°54′16″N 12°30′09″E
- Major junctions: Via Solferino & Via San Martino della Battaglia

Construction
- Construction start: 1872

Piazza dell'Indipendenza (Independence Square) in Rome is a square in Municipio V (the 5th municipality) of the Castro Pretorio district of the Italian capital city. It is situated between Via Solferino and Via San Martino della Battaglia.

== History ==
After the annexation of Rome by the Kingdom of Italy, in 1871, work began on the construction of a new district at the Castro Pretorio. The first settlement was built for the nobility and the upper middle class that had migrated to Rome to serve in a political office or the Royal Court, while Esquilino, also under construction, was intended for the clerical and petty bourgeois classes. The new quarter was built around a square that would function as the center of the new area. In 1872, it was decided to name it Independence Square, honoring the Italian War of Independence. The new square rose roughly where in Ancient Rome stood Campus Scelleratus, the place where the Vestali (the Vestal Virgins) who violated their virginity vows were buried alive.

By 1872, the square was already called "the new quarter" in travel books.

== Notable sights ==
The Palazzo dei Marescialli (the Marshalls Palace), built in 1937 by Costantino Costantini, houses the Consiglio Superiore della Magistratura (the High Council of the Judiciary). In 1979, a bomb was placed in a car near the building by members of the far-right terrorist organization Movimento Rivoluzionario Popolare (Revolutionary Popular Movement) but it malfunctioned and failed to explode.
