= 1985 Athens bar bombing =

Far-right bombing aimed at Americans

- Location: 37°52′45.28″N 23°45′17.13″E; Athens, Greece
- Date: 2 February 1985 (UTC+01:00)
- Target: Americans
- Attack type: Bombing
- Weapon: Time bomb
- Deaths: 0
- Injuries: 78
- Perpetrator: National Front

On 2 February 1985, Bobby's Bar in Glyfada, a suburb of Athens in Greece, was bombed. The bar was popular with American airmen stationed at the nearby Hellenikon Air Base. Police spokesman Nikos Gizas said about fifty of the injured were Americans. Some of them were brought to U.S. bases in West Germany for treatment.

== Responsibility ==
A far-right group calling itself National Front claimed responsibility. A caller claiming to be from the group said that the bombing was aimed at Americans who were "responsible" for the occupation of Cyprus, which had been divided since the Turkish invasion of Cyprus in 1974. Sources said that an organization called 'National Front' was formed in 1968 as a predecessor to the EOKA-B Greek-Cypriot nationalist group.

== See also ==
- 1988 Naples bombing
- 1987 Greece bus attacks
