= Ordine Nero =

Italian militant fascist group active in the 1970s

Logo from a 1974 flyer

The Ordine Nero (English: Black Order) was an Italian neo-fascist terrorist organization founded in 1974 following the dissolution of the terror group Ordine Nuovo. Between 1974 and 1978, bombings by ON led to a number of woundings and deaths, having orchestrated several deadly bombings and murders such as the 1974 Italicus Express Bombing and the in 1974 Brescia Bombing.

== History ==
Ordine Nero simply adopted the ideologies of Ordine Nuovo. For the members of the neo-fascist Ordine Nero, the ultimate goal was to destroy the liberal-democratic state in order to clear the way for the fascist one. The Democratic state was assailed by the neo-fascists for its weakness, its alleged tolerance of Communists in parliament, dark-skinned immigrants in the labor force, and Jews in positions of power and influence. The neo-fascists belonging to Ordine Nero believed that the nation's survival was dependent upon the exorcism of these three elements; only by becoming politically, racially, and culturally homogeneous can the state recover its strength and again work for its natural citizens and not a variegated collection of interlopers. Regardless of their ultimate goal, they did not appear to have any specific program of reform. Instead, they actively espoused fascist slogans of nationalism, racial purity, and governmental strength. Ordine Nero operated alongside like-minded groups like "Movimento Armato Rivoluzionario", "Terza Posizione", and "Nuclei Armati Rivoluzionari". Many of these groups existed in name only. Like their counterparts on the left, right-wing terrorists staged different operations under different names in order to give the impression of size and strength.

There is an ongoing controversy over whether the group had a role in any strategy of tension endorsed by elements of the Italian government or NATO. Bomber Vincenzo Vinciguerra alleged that the Italian security services and the "Atlantic Alliance", particularly the United States, had a role in the group's activities.

== Activities ==
=== Bombings ===
==== Savona bombings ====
A series of bomb attacks occurred in Savona, Italy from April 1974 to May 1975. The public prosecutor reopened one of the bombing cases, it remained without a manager, which made the reopening of the case useless. The bombs resulted in injuring 18 people and caused severe damage to public and private building structures.

One of these bombings took place on the eve of May Day. On April 30, 1974, a plastic bomb exploded in the center of Savona, a short distance from a cinema where the film Last Days of Mussolini was being shown, which had been greeted with anger by neo-fascists. It was the first of the so-called Savona bombs; the device, placed in the entrance hall of the building where Christian Democrat senator Franco Varaldo lived, caused extensive damage to the building but no injuries. A few days after the attack, Ordine Nero was identified as responsible.

==== 1974 Piazza della Loggia bombing in Brescia ====
In May 1974 eight activists were killed in Brescia when an anti-fascist protest was taking place in the municipal square. Due to a bomb placed in a trash bin, 8 people died from the explosion, over a hundred were wounded. On May 19, 2005, the Corte di Cassazione confirmed the arrest warrant against Delfo Zorzi, a former Ordine Nuovo member, who was also suspected of being the material perpetrator of the 1969 Piazza Fontana bombing. Alongside Delfo Zorzi, his neo-fascist comrades Carlo Maria Maggi and Maurizio Tramonte, all members of Ordine Nuovo, are also suspected of having organized the Piazza della Loggia bombing in Brescia. The city of Brescia, Italy suffered from one of Ordine Nero's worst operations. On 28 May 1974, a bomb placed inside a garbage container in Piazza Della Loggia detonated. Eight people were killed and one hundred and two injured. A day before the attack, the city's newspapers announced that they had received a message from the Black Order. The message threatened that multiple attacks would occur against businesses in the city. Since that attack, the government has held three trials, with the third concluding in 2017. The trials included the new order official Carlo Maria Maggi, who was convicted for organizing the massacre, and the militant Maurizio Tramonte.

==== Italicus Express bombing 1974 ====
On 4 August 1974 a Ferrovie dello Stato train was bombed in the early morning killing 12 and wounding 48. The following day, Ordine Nero (The new Ordine Nuovo) claimed responsibility.

In a written statement they said:

We took revenge for Giancarlo Esposti. We wanted to show the nation that we can place a bomb anywhere we want, whenever and however we please. Let us see in autumn; we will drown democracy under a mountain of dead.

Giancarlo Esposti was killed on 30 May 1974. On 4 August 4, a bomb planted by members of the Ordine Nero exploded on the Italicus Express, claiming 12 lives and injuring 48. The bomb went off as the train exited the San Benedetto Val di Sambro tunnel. Although former Prime Minister Aldo Moro had disembarked the train days before the bomb detonated, many scholars believe that Moro was the true target. The Ordine Nero claimed the bombing was retribution for the killing of the purported Brescia bomber, Giancarlo Esposti, by Italian police. Following the bombing, several Ordine Nero members were detained.

In February 1978, a bomb exploded on the outside of "Gazzettino di Venezia" main entrance. Gazzettino di Venezia is an editorial building of the conservative newspaper. The building is located in Venice, Italy. The explosion resulted in killing the night watchman, 49-year-old Franco Battaggliarin, who died instantly from the explosion. The police reported that they received an anonymous call claiming that the bomb was planted by Ordine Nero.

On 10 August 1983, a bomb was planted on Milan-Palermo train. Train of Milan-Palermo held approximately one thousand passengers. The bomb detonator failed to operate. The failure of the detonator occurred as the train approached the proximity of Vernio. The railroads were supposed to blow up due to the explosion, but due to the failure, only two mechanics were slightly injured from flying glass. Ordine Nero claimed the attack via telephone.

=== Arrests ===
Marco Pastori, a member of the Ordine Nero living in Spain, was arrested several times by Spanish police. Police say that the 38-year-old man was extremely dangerous, and he had been convicted of using and owning firearms and explosive which cost him different charges. He was first arrested in April 1974 over a bank shooting. He was accused of killing a bank clerk and a 10-year-old girl. After he escaped, he was re-arrested in 1975. After a few years later he escaped for the second time in 1978. The police said that various neo-fascist groups in South America took him in.

== See also ==
- Armed, far-right organizations in Italy
- Years of Lead (Italy)
- Operation Gladio
