= Nanni De Angelis =

Italian political activist (1958–1980)

Nazareno Andrea De Angelis
- Born: 31 July 1958; Rome, Italy
- Died: 5 October 1980 (aged 22); Rome, Italy
- Other names: Nanni; Piccolo Atilla
- Organization: Terza Posizione
- Known for: Acts of terrorism
- Movement: Neofascism
- Opponents: Italian police; Italian left

Nazareno Andrea De Angelis or Nanni (Campotosto, 31 July 1958 – Rome; 5 October 1980) was an Italian political militant and a leader of Terza Posizione.

== Biography ==
=== Lotta Studentesca ===
In 1976, with Gabriele Adinolfi, Roberto Fiore and Walter Spedicato, he founded Lotta Studentesca.

On 22 February 1980 Valerio Verbano was murdered in Rome. A few days later, De Angelis is called to the phone by Verbano's father convinced that the death of his son was due to revenge. De Angelis met Verbano's father talking together for about an hour and broke up on good terms.

Following the Bologna massacre of 2 August, on 23 September, arrest warrants were issued against many TP members, including Nanni De Angelis and his brother Marcello. About five hundred agents are employed to arrest wanted persons and to search for members of the organization. De Angelis manages to escape and gets in touch with Luigi Ciavardini, identified as the killer of the policeman Evangelista. On 3 October 1980 they went to an appointment with Carlo Sette to obtain false documents and financial support, but they were arrested on the Barberini Square by the police. At the time of his arrest, De Angelis was reportedly severely beaten on the head by police officers. Senator of the Italian Social Movement Michele Marchio, in a question to the Senate addressed to Deputy Secretary Angelo Sanza, reported that De Angelis was reportedly "beaten up" inside the police station.

=== Death ===
On the morning of 5 October 1980, Nanni De Angelis was admitted to the hospital where the doctors drew up a medical report which, although showing no fracture or injury, provided for a seven-day stoppage, but was released on same morning and returned by ambulance to Rebibbia Prison. The same day he was found hanged in his cell.

The version of the police immediately published in the newspapers spoke of suicide. An investigation followed, recorded in the autopsy report ordered by the magistrate. In this report, signed by Professor Silvio Merli, contrary to what was stated by the prison doctors, there are many bruises all over the body and especially on the head. De Angelis' family has never accepted the hypothesis of the son's suicide.

On 30 September 1981, Marco Pizzari, suspected of having "betrayed" Ciavardini and De Angelis for informing the police of the place where they had an appointment with Carlo Sette, was killed by the NAR with three shots. Journalist Luca Telese has posited that Pizzari had not betrayed, but rather that his phone had been tapped by the police.

== In culture ==
Songs dedicated to Nanni de Angelis (see also: Anternative right-wing music (Italy)):

- Hyperborea - Piccolo Atilla
- 270bis - Nanni e partito (song written by Nanni's brother Marcelo De Angelis)

In Spain

- Mara Ros - No olvido
