= Gabriele Adinolfi =

Italian far-right ideologue and essayist (born 1954)

- Born: Gabriele Adinolfi; 3 January 1954 (age 71); Rome, Italy
- Occupations: Politician; journalist
- Height: 1.77 m (5 ft 10 in)

Gabriele Adinolfi is an Italian far-right ideologue and essayist. Adinolfi was involved in Terza Posizione, a short-lived far-right group founded in 1979. Like other neo-fascists of his generation, he saw his enemy as the far-left and the Italian Social Movement (MSI). He founded several publications and a website called Noreporter.

He has self-published two books, namely Noi Terza Posizione (Us, Third Position) (2000) with Roberto Fiore and Il domani che ci appartenne (The tomorrow which belonged to us) (2005).
