= Peteano massacre =

31 May 1972 car bomb in Italy

- Part of Years of Lead (Italy)
- The car bomb after the explosion
- Location: Sagrado, Italy
- Date: 31 May 1972
- Attack type: Car bombing
- Deaths: 3
- Injuries: 2
- Perpetrator: New Order
- Motive: Neo-fascist terrorism

The Peteano massacre (Italian: strage di Peteano) was a neo-fascist terrorist attack which occurred on May 31, 1972 in Peteano, a frazione of Sagrado (Gorizia), Italy. An anonymous call led five carabinieri to check a suspicious car, which turned out to be a car bomb that exploded when the door was opened. Three carabinieri were killed.

The perpetrators were Vincenzo Vinciguerra, Carlo Cicuttini and Ivano Boccaccio, all members of Ordine Nuovo, a far-right organisation. Boccaccio was killed in a separate action in October 1972, while Vinciguerra and Cicuttini were both convicted to life in prison. Cicuttini lived as a fugitive in Spain for several years before his arrest in 1998; he was released for health reason shortly before his death in 2010.

== History ==
The massacre occurred during a time of political upheaval in Italy. On May 7, 1972, the early elections had taken place which had assigned the leadership of the country to a new executive chaired by Giulio Andreotti, while the Calabresi murder occurred on 17 May. The political debate was still turbulent and was accompanied by feared attempts at a coup d'état. Before Peteano, there had been several terrorist attacks and massacres of fascist origin. In conjunction with the tensions linked to groups of the extra-parliamentary left that had also undertaken an armed struggle, there was a climate of fear and concern within political parties and the Italian government (a state of affairs dubbed the "theory of opposite extremisms").

The night of May 31, at 22:35, an anonymous phone call reached the emergency service of the Carabinieri station of Gorizia which was received by switchboard operator Domenico La Malfa. The text of the communication is as follows:

"Hello? Look, I would like to tell you that there is a car with two holes on the windshield in the road from Poggio Terza Armata to Savogna ... It's a (Fiat) 500 ..."

Three gazelles of the carabinieri arrived at the venue and found the white Fiat 500 (license plate: GO 45902) with the two holes in the windscreen, as the anonymous informant had communicated in dialect, parked in a curve at kilometer 5. Ten minutes later, two carabinieri from Gradisca, Franco Dongiovanni and Mango, arrived at the scene. Mango called his officer, Lieutenant Tagliari, who arrived at the scene accompanied by the brigadier Antonio Ferraro and the carabiniere Donato Poveromo along with a second gazelle at 23:05. They were then joined by a third patrol from Gorizia.

When Ferraro, Poveromo and Dongiovanni attempted to open the hood of the vehicle, an explosion was triggered that killed them and seriously injured two others.

== Investigations ==
Colonel Dino Mingarelli, the old right-hand man of the general Giovanni de Lorenzo, was placed to direct the investigation on the matter. Mingarelli immediately directed his investigation into the Lotta Continua circles of Trento but the investigations did not obtain the expected results: The Milanese judiciary received information according to which the attack would be carried out by a group neo-fascist terrorist, which also included Ivano Boccaccio, a militant killed in an attempted hijacking of a plane at Ronchi dei Legionari airport in the following October.

The information had been given by Giovanni Ventura, meanwhile arrested for the Piazza Fontana bombing: the colonel however discarded the Milanese indication, as an order from the SID invited him to suspend investigations into the far-right terrorist group. The colonel, with his "right arm" captain Antonino Chirico, directed the investigative attentions towards six young people, leading them to trial: according to Mingarelli they would take revenge on some rude people suffered by the carabinieri.

The proposed motive did not convince the judges, who acquitted the six young people, who, once free, denounced Mingarelli for the false accusations, initiating a new investigation against police officers and magistrates for having diverted the investigations. Meanwhile, the investigation of the massacre was directed towards the neo-fascist circles.
