= Terza Posizione =

Italian far-right political movement

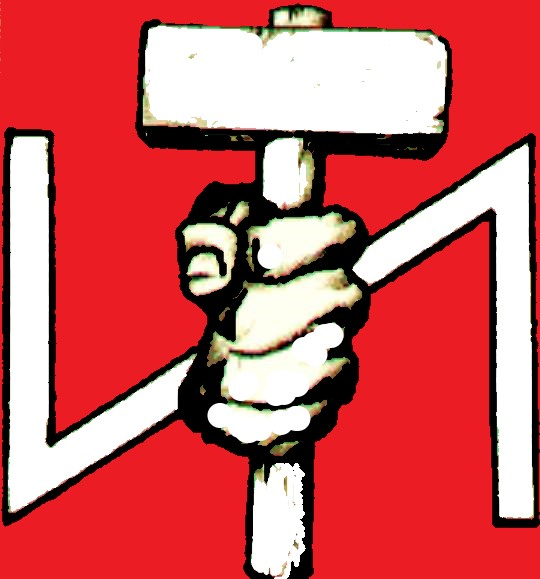
- Logo
- Formation: 1978
- Dissolved: 1982; 44 years ago
- Type: Neo-fascist political movement
- Location: Rome, Italy

Terza Posizione (English: Third Position) was an Italian movement that declared itself to be a politically syncretic movement and part of the Third Position, but was primarily a neo-fascist and subversive organization. It was founded in Rome in 1978 by Giuseppe Dimitri, Roberto Fiore, and Gabriele Adinolfi, and remained active until 1982. The group published a journal, also called Terza Posizione which promoted Third Position politics.

Born from the ashes of the youth organization Lotta Studentesca (English: Student Struggle), Terza Posizione presented itself as a national-revolutionary movement that sought a break from the political logic of the far right at the time, declaring itself equidistant both from communism and from the reactionary, capitalist, and imperialist models of the right.

The symbol adopted by Terza Posizione was inspired by the Wolfsangel rune, a German term meaning “wolf’s hook/fang”, which in the past had also been associated with the Panzer Division “Das Reich”. Originally, the symbol appears to derive from an ancient talisman used to protect against attacks by wolves or, conversely, to represent the wolf itself.

== History ==
=== The beginnings: Lotta Studentesca ===
The loss of support among right-wing youth within the Italian Social Movement, which around the mid-1970s, stuck in vague anti-communist positions, had lost much of its appeal to younger generations, opened a gap in the furthest right-wing political area. This gap was in some way filled by the emergence of several extra-parliamentary political entities.

“In Rome during those years, the right-wing youth world had practically disappeared from the streets. The Youth Front no longer existed; all of us who had joined right-wing organizations were living an almost clandestine life. I remember that in my school, whatever happened at the national political level, in Rome and beyond, I became the scapegoat to be attacked and beaten, and so did the other comrades in the other schools. Little by little, in order to withstand this whole set of circumstances, and considering that extra-parliamentary organizations no longer existed, we tried to organize ourselves individually within the structures we were part of, and by forming school-based nuclei we began to move forward, each within our respective environments. Gradually we began to learn that there was a group active in one school or another sphere, and in this climate of desertification of right-wing youth it came naturally to start drawing closer, meeting, and confronting one another. Thus Lotta Studentesca was born, out of a moment of particular crisis in which the youngest forces gathered together and gave life to a new embryonic organization.” (Vincenzo Piso, from A destra della destra)

In 1976, with Ordine Nuovo f(English: New Order) and National Vanguard by then dissolved by parliamentary decree, this climate of desertification within the right-wing youth milieu also spread to the area of extra-parliamentary organizations. Against this background, in February of that year, a series of meetings were held at the Libreria Romana, managed by Walter Spedicato, a former activist of the Student Movement at the Faculty of Law of La Sapienza University. Among those who took part were three Roman neo-fascist activists: Gabriele Adinolfi, Giuseppe Dimitri, and Roberto Fiore, coming respectively from the Fronte Studentesco (English: Student Front), National Vanguard, and Ordine Nuovo. Strongly influenced by the thought of Franco Freda, a friend and best man at Spedicato’s wedding, those meetings led to the birth of a new movement. It was initially founded with the intention of recruiting and organizing militants to fight against the two imperialisms of the USA and the USSR, hence the name “Terza Posizione”.

Situated halfway between the Italian Social Movement, bogged down in party politics, and the armed spontaneism of the Nuclei Armati Rivoluzionari, Third Position stepped into that generational vacuum, attracting a large number of supporters among right-wing youth. Over time, the need arose to broaden the organization’s horizons through the creation of a magazine. It was at this stage that the name Third Position appeared for the first time, as a subtitle of the newspaper Lotta Studentesca.

The political line of Lotta Studentesca was made public with the publication of the newspaper’s second issue: “To be active within the spheres of Third Position means fighting Russian-American imperialism, rejecting and sabotaging the two political, commercial, and military blocs linked to the Kremlin and the White House”.

== See also ==
- Years of Lead (Italy)
- Nuclei Armati Rivoluzionari
